= Bartow County School District =

School district in Georgia (U.S. state)

Address
- 65 Gilreath Road Northwest Cartersville, Georgia, 30121-5016; United States
- Coordinates: 34.223047°N 84.813321°W

District information
- Grades: Pre-kindergarten – 12
- Superintendent: Clint Terza

Students and staff
- Enrollment: 13,806 (2022–23)
- Faculty: 931.30 (FTE)
- Staff: 956.20 (FTE)
- Student–teacher ratio: 14.82

Other information
- Accreditation: Southern Association of Colleges and Schools; Georgia Accrediting Commission
- Telephone: (770) 606-5800
- Fax: (770) 606-5855
- Website: bartow.k12.ga.us

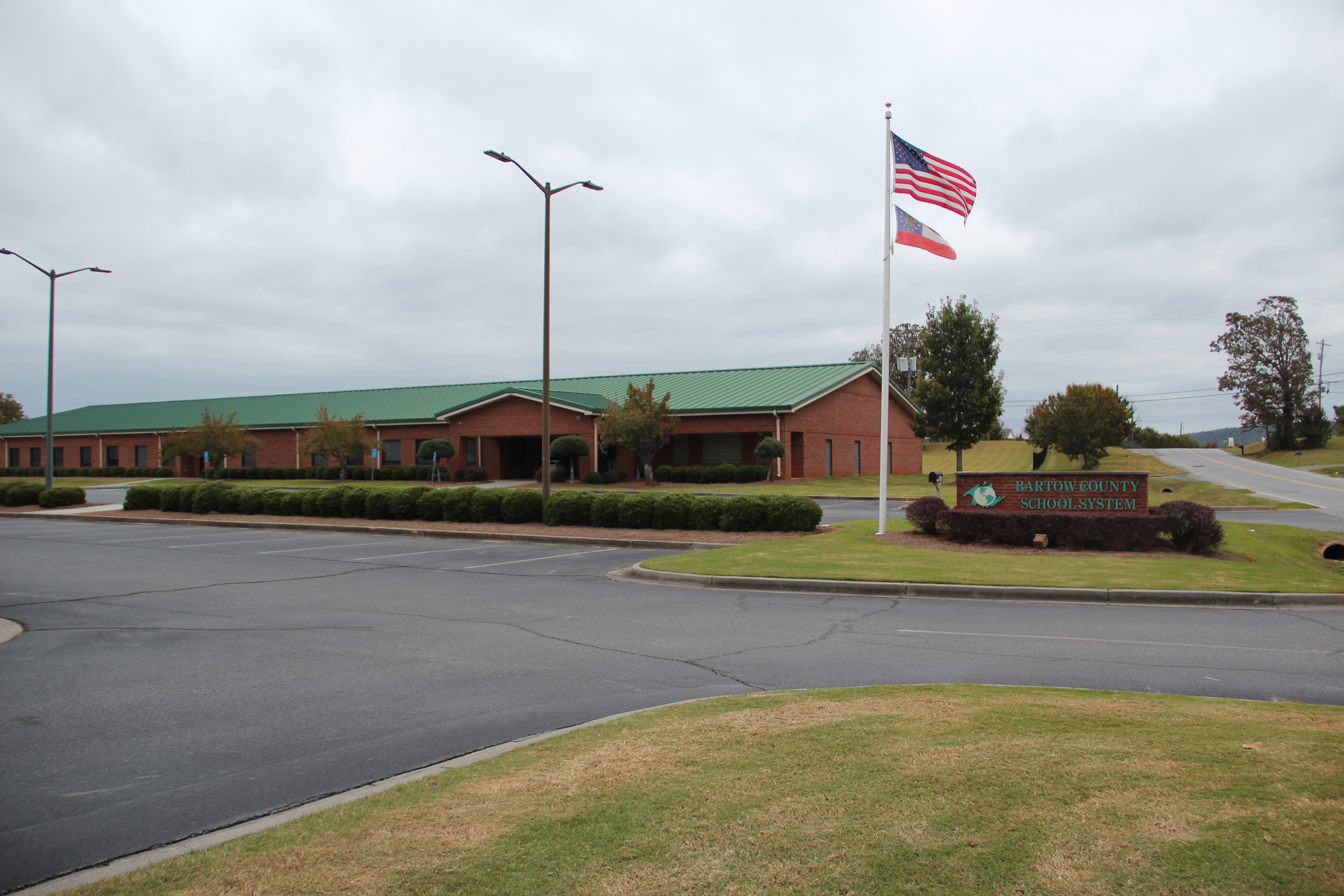
Bartow County School District headquarters in 2017

The Bartow County School District is a public school district in Bartow County, Georgia, United States, based in Cartersville. It serves the communities of Adairsville, Atco, Cartersville, Cassville, Emerson, Euharlee, Kingston, Rowland Springs, Stilesboro, Taylorsville, and White. Within the city limits of Cartersville, students are served by Cartersville City School District.

== Schools ==
The Bartow County School District holds twelve elementary schools, four middle schools, and three high schools.

=== Elementary schools ===
- Adairsville Elementary School
- Allatoona Elementary School
- Clear Creek Elementary School
- Cloverleaf Elementary School
- Emerson Elementary School
- Euharlee Elementary School
- Hamilton Crossing Elementary School
- Kingston Elementary School
- Mission Road Elementary School
- Pine Log Elementary School
- Taylorsville Elementary School
- White Elementary School

=== Middle schools ===
- Adairsville Middle School
- Cass Middle School
- Red Top Middle School
- Woodland Middle School

=== High schools ===
- Adairsville High School
- Cass High School
- Woodland High School

=== College And Career Academy ===
- Bartow College And Career Academy
