= Atco, Georgia =

Unincorporated community in Georgia, U.S.

Atco
- Unincorporated community
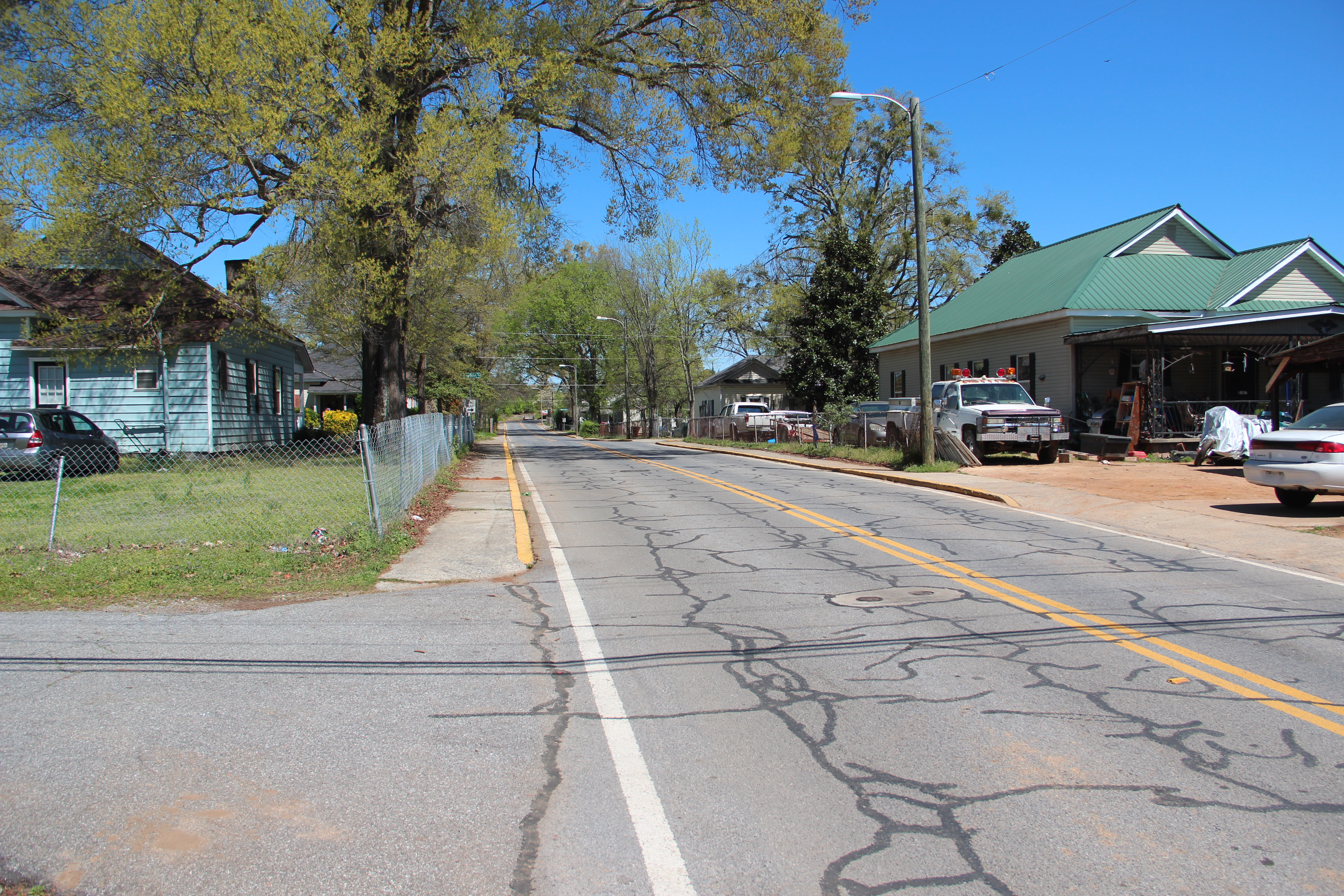
- Mayflower Street

- Location within Georgia
- Coordinates: 34°10′50″N 84°49′12″W
- Country: USA
- State: Georgia
- County: Bartow County
- Founded: 1904

Atco is a small unincorporated community on the northwestern side of Cartersville in southern Bartow County, Georgia, United States. There are numerous baseball and soccer complexes in the area, primarily along Sugar Valley and Cassville Roads, making it a popular destination for subdivisions. The community derived its name from the American Textile Company, which built a mill in the community.

== Geography ==
Atco is located at 34°10′50″N 84°49′12″W (34.1806523, -84.8199389). The community is at an elevation of 728 feet (222 m) and is located inside Cartersville's city limits. Pettit Creek flows to the east of Atco, while Nancy Creek is located on the west side of the community.

== History ==
In 1903, Edward McClain of the American Textile Company bought 600 acres of land north of Cartersville to construct a textile plant to manufacture horse collars. The plant was completed in 1904. In addition to building the plant, the American Textile Company also constructed about 40 homes for its workers. It was from the American Textile Company where Atco got its name. A post office called Atco was established in 1907, and remained in operation until it was discontinued in 1965.

With the horse collar business declining due to the automobile, the ATCO Mill produced many other products before it was bought by Goodyear in 1929. Under Goodyear's control, the mill proceeded to manufacture tire fabric products. Goodyear also expanded the village, building hundreds of homes as well as a school, as well as renaming the streets to their current names. In 1934, the mill's employees participated in the strikes that were common in the local textile industry. After being annexed by Cartersville in 1957, Goodyear began selling off its homes. In 1963, Atco's school was closed, while in 2003, Goodyear closed the Atco Mill, laying off the remaining 319 employees. Much of the plant was razed in 2009 and 2010. In 2005, the Atco Mill was listed on the National Register of Historic Places.

== Notable people ==
- Lee Roy Abernathy, gospel musician
- Joe Frank Harris, Governor of Georgia.
- Rudy York, MLB player and manager.
