= Cass High School (Georgia) =

Public school in Cartersville, Georgia, US

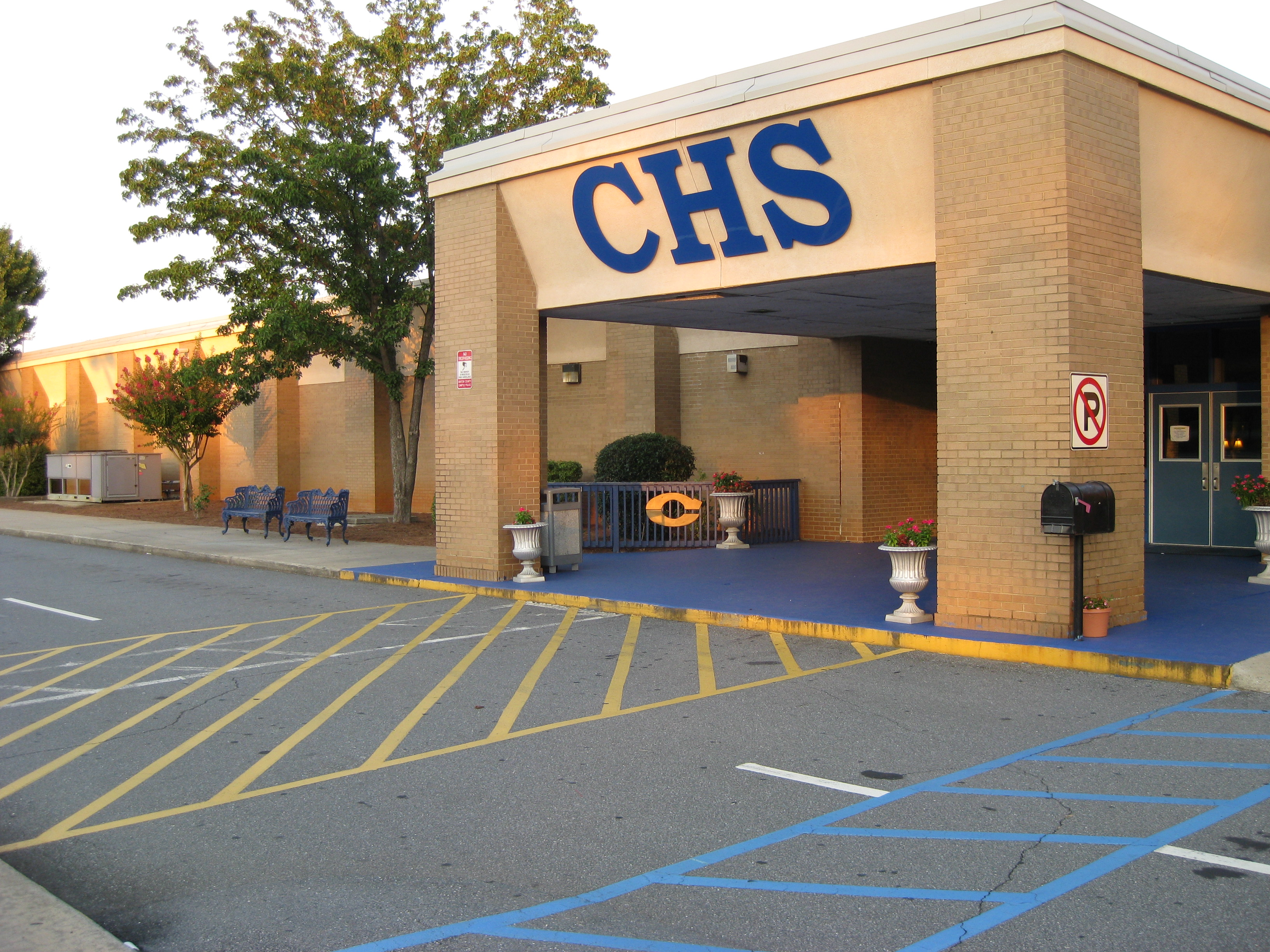
- The old high school building on Grassdale Road in Cartersville

Location
- 1000 Colonel Way; White, Georgia 30184; United States; 34°12′23″N 84°49′09″W

Information
- Type: Public
- Motto: "Educating, Encouraging & Empowering"
- School district: Bartow County School District
- CEEB code: 110625
- Principal: Steve Revard
- Teaching staff: 93.10 (on FTE basis)
- Grades: 9 to 12
- Enrollment: 1,623 (2023-2024)
- Student to teacher ratio: 17.43
- Colors: Blue and gold
- Athletics conference: GHSA Region 7-AAAA
- Sports: Football, men's basketball, women's basketball, baseball, men's soccer, women's soccer, volleyball, softball, swimming, cross country, wrestling, track, tennis, and golf
- Mascot: Colonel
- Team name: Cass Colonels
- Website: www.bartow.k12.ga.us/o/cass-high

Cass High School is a four-year public high school located in Cartersville, Georgia, United States, and is one of three high schools in the Bartow County school system. It serves over 1500 students in grades 9–12. The current principal is Stephen Revard.

== Athletics ==
Cass High School offers a variety of sports, including football, men's basketball, women's basketball, baseball, men's soccer, women's soccer, volleyball, softball, swimming, cross country, wrestling, track, tennis, and golf.

=== Football ===
The Cass Colonels football team have taken 7 trips to the Playoffs including an appearance in 2004 breaking a 21 year drought. In 1980 the Colonels won their only region championship going 10-0 in the regular season including a win over Cartersville in week one. Recently the Colonels have had 5 consecutive play-off appearances under Head Coach Steve Gates, including an appearance in the Elite Eight in 2024 and the first ever playoff game hosted in Doug Cochran Stadium in 2026 where the Colonels defeated Mays 24-12.

=== Wrestling ===
- 2006 – GHSAA Class AAA Dual Wrestling Champions
- 2008 – GHSAA Class AAA Traditional Wrestling Champions
- 2022 – GHSA 5A Dual State Champions

=== Men’s soccer ===
In 2008 the Cass High School soccer team were ranked 5th in state.

== Notable alumni ==
- Eddie Lee Wilkins, former professional basketball player
- Sacovie White-Helton, college football wide receiver for the Georgia Bulldogs
