= Sproull =

Sproull is a surname. Notable people with the surname include:

- Bob Sproull (born c. 1945), American computer scientist
- Charlie Sproull (1919–1980), American baseball player
- Hayley Sproull (born 1989), New Zealand comedian, scriptwriter and television show host
- Robert Sproull (1918–2014), American academic, physicist and United States Department of Defense official
