= Nancy Creek (Cartersville) =

Coordinates: 34°9′14″N 84°49′38″W

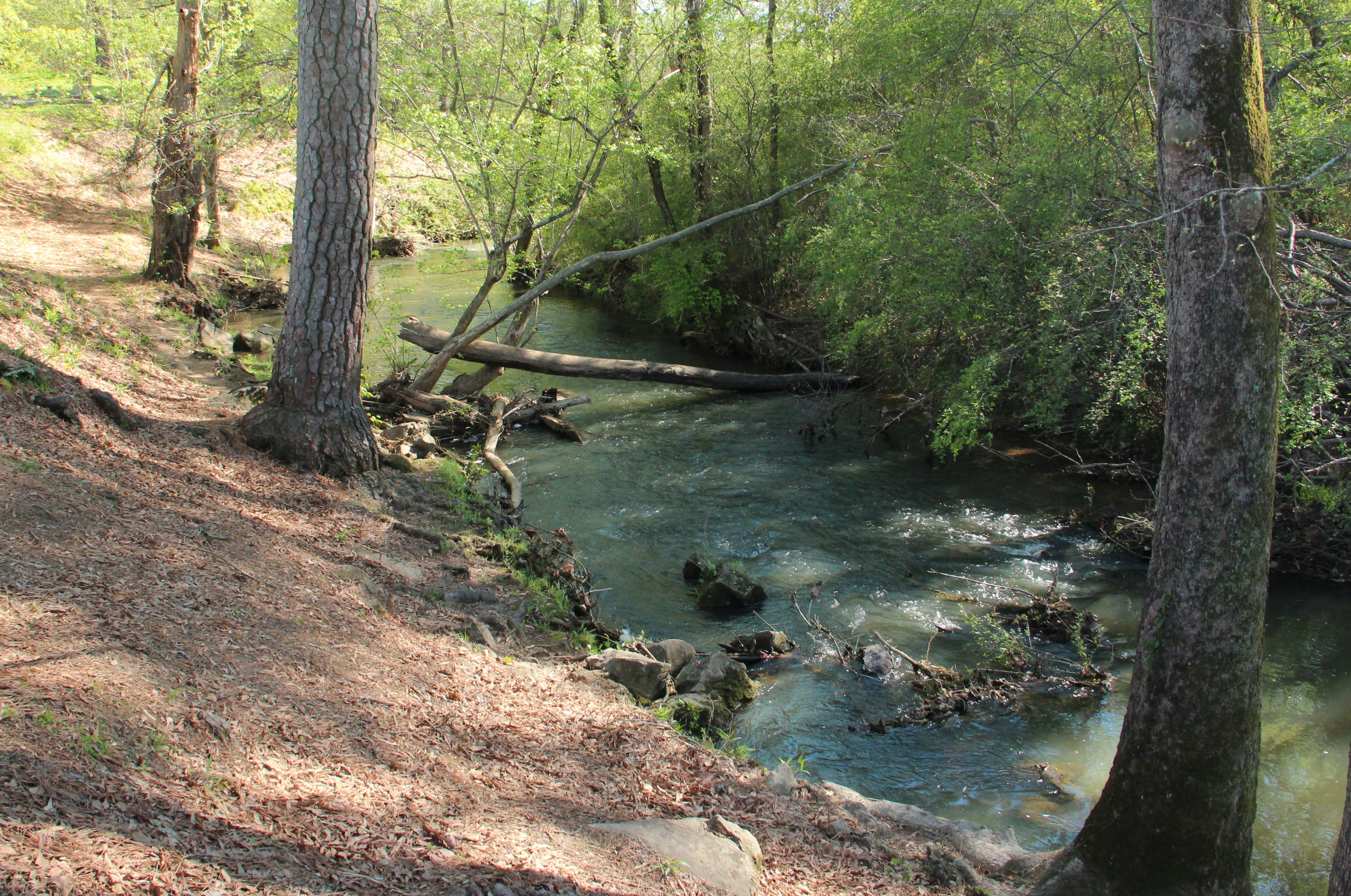
Nancy Creek in Cartersville

Nancy Creek is a stream near Cartersville in Bartow County, Georgia, United States. It is a tributary to Pettit Creek.

Nancy Creek was probably named for a Native American (Indian) woman.
