= Roselawn (Cartersville, Georgia) =

Historic house in Georgia, United States

- U.S. National Register of Historic Places
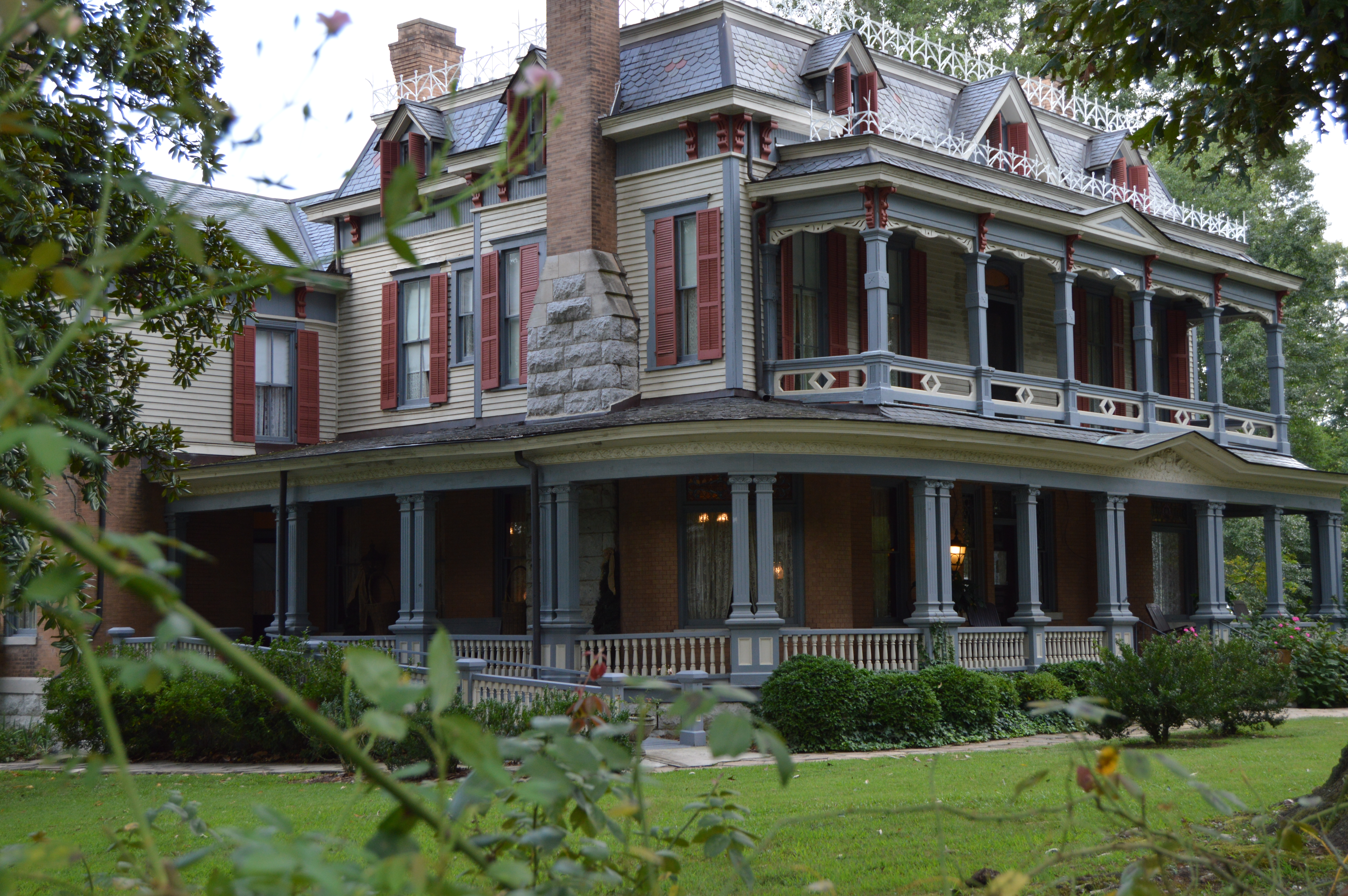
- Location: 244 Cherokee Avenue, Cartersville, Georgia
- NRHP reference No.: 73000607
- Added to NRHP: January 12, 1973

Roselawn is a mansion in Cartersville in the U.S. state of Georgia and is now a museum.

== Location ==
Roselawn is located at 244 Cherokee Avenue, Cartersville, Bartow County, Georgia, United States.

== History ==
In the 1860s, Nelson Gilreath, a local merchant, built a one-story house with an attic. By 1872, the attic was converted into bedrooms.

In the 1880s, the house was purchased by Samuel Porter Jones, a Christian revivalist. Jones added two stories at the back of the house. By 1895, he added a third floor and a basement. After Jones died in 1906, his widow, Laura McElwain Jones, continued to reside there until the 1920s.

In the 1930s, the house was purchased by Guy Parmenter and his wife, Marie Cole Bell Parmenter. The couple added an elevator and resided there until 1968. It was uninhabited for the next decade.

The house was acquired by Bartow County in 1978. They converted it into a museum about the lives of Samuel Porter Jones and another famed resident of Cartersville (though not Roselawn), Rebecca Latimer Felton.

== Architectural significance ==
It has been listed on the National Register of Historic Places since January 12, 1973.
