= Taylorsville, Georgia =

- Town
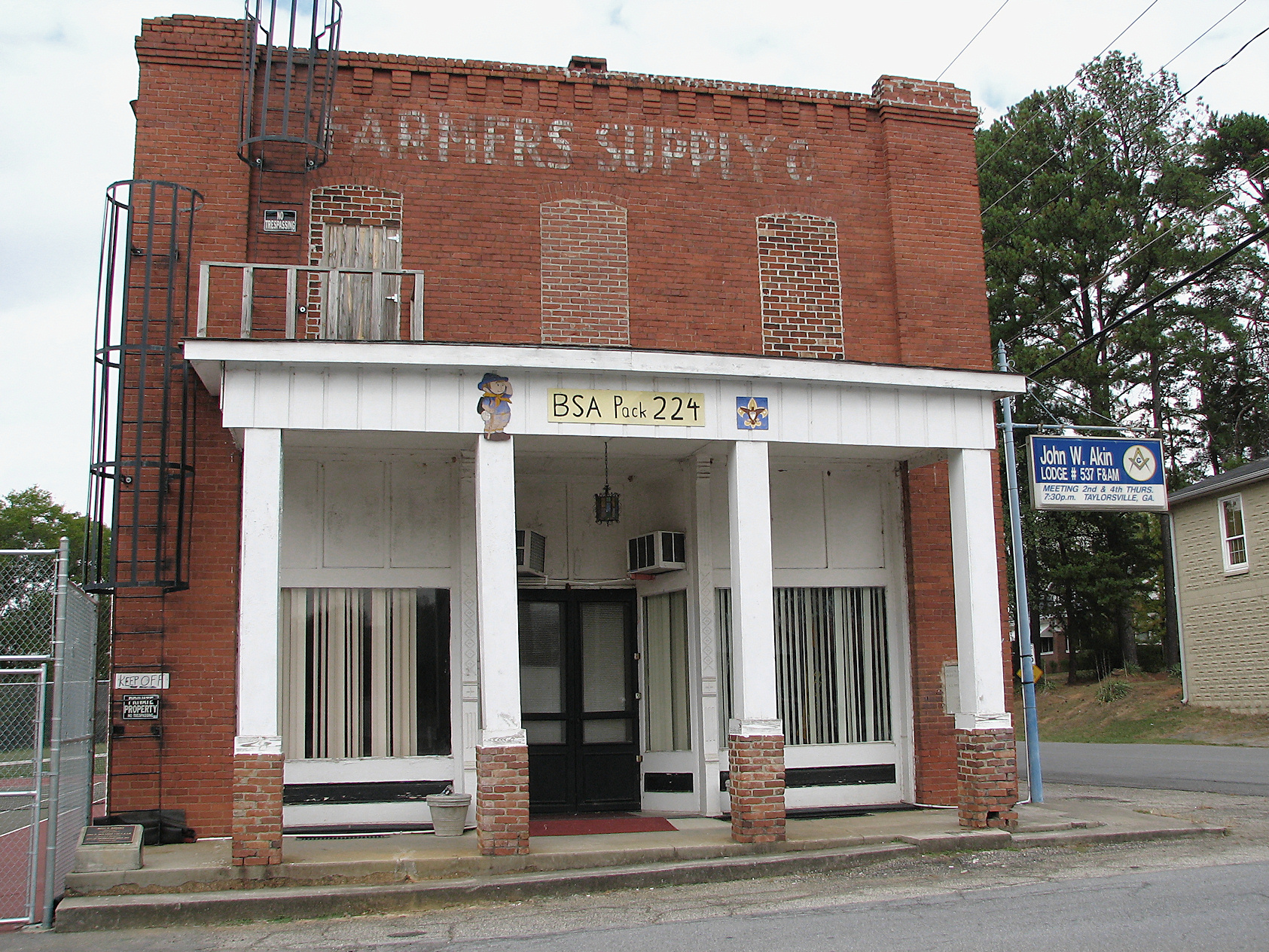
- Farmers Supply Company in Taylorsville

- Location in Bartow County and the state of Georgia
- Coordinates: 34°05′10″N 84°59′15″W
- Country: United States
- State: Georgia
- Counties: Bartow, Polk

Area
  - Total: 1.49 sq mi (3.86 km^{2})
  - Land: 1.49 sq mi (3.86 km^{2})
  - Water: 0 sq mi (0.00 km^{2})
- Elevation: 732 ft (223 m)

Population (2020)
  - Total: 252
  - Density: 168.9/sq mi (65.22/km^{2})
- Time zone: UTC-5 (Eastern (EST))
  - Summer (DST): UTC-4 (EDT)
- ZIP code: 30178
- Area codes: 770/678/470/943
- FIPS code: 13-75664
- GNIS feature ID: 0323966

Taylorsville is a town in Bartow and Polk counties in the U.S. state of Georgia. The population was 252 at the 2020 census, up 20.0% from 210 at the 2010 census.

== History ==
Taylorsville was surveyed circa 1870 by Edward G. Taylor, and named for him. The Georgia General Assembly incorporated Taylorsville as a town in 1916.

== Geography ==
According to the United States Census Bureau, the town has a total area of 1.5 square miles (3.9 km^{2}), all of it land.

=== Climate ===
Taylorsville has a humid subtropical climate (Köppen climate classification Cfa), with cool to mild winters and hot, humid summers.

Climate data for Taylorsville, Georgia
Month	Jan	Feb	Mar	Apr	May	Jun	Jul	Aug	Sep	Oct	Nov	Dec	Year
Mean daily maximum °F (°C)	56 (13)	62 (17)	66 (19)	77 (25)	84 (29)	90 (32)	95 (35)	94 (34)	86 (30)	77 (25)	62 (17)	51 (11)	75 (24)
Mean daily minimum °F (°C)	29 (−2)	32 (0)	46 (8)	51 (11)	65 (18)	71 (22)	78 (26)	76 (24)	61 (16)	49 (9)	40 (4)	29 (−2)	52 (11)
Source: Weatherbase

== Demographics ==
Historical population
Census	Pop.	Note	%±
1880	95		—
1890	87		−8.4%
1900	139		59.8%
1910	197		41.7%
1920	258		31.0%
1930	220		−14.7%
1940	233		5.9%
1950	260		11.6%
1960	226		−13.1%
1970	253		11.9%
1980	266		5.1%
1990	269		1.1%
2000	229		−14.9%
2010	210		−8.3%
2020	252		20.0%
U.S. Decennial Census

=== 2020 census ===
Taylorsville racial composition
Race	Num.	Perc.
White (non-Hispanic)	235	93.25%
Mixed (two or more races)	10	3.96%
Hispanic or Latino	6	2.38%
Black or African American (non-Hispanic)	2	0.79%
American Indian or Alaskan Native	2	0.79%
Asian	0	0%
Native Hawaiian and Pacific Islander	0	0%
Other	3	1.19%

As of the 2020 United States census, there were 252 people, 100 households, and 70 families residing in the town.

=== 2010 census ===
As of the census of 2010, the population was 3,796. The population density was 153.3 inhabitants per square mile (59.2/km^{2}). There were 103 housing units at an average density of 68.9 per square mile (26.6/km^{2}). The racial makeup of the town was 93.45% White, 4.37% African American, 0.87% from other races, and 1.31% from two or more races. Hispanic or Latino people of any race were 1.75% of the population.

There were 93 households, out of which 28.0% had children under the age of 18 living with them, 64.5% were married couples living together, 5.4% had a female householder with no husband present, and 25.8% were non-families. 23.7% of all households were made up of individuals, and 16.1% had someone living alone who was 65 years of age or older. The average household size was 2.46 and the average family size was 2.84.

In the town, the population was spread out, with 21.4% under the age of 18, 6.1% from 18 to 24, 31.4% from 25 to 44, 24.0% from 45 to 64, and 17.0% who were 65 years of age or older. The median age was 38 years. For every 100 females, there were 90.8 males. For every 100 females age 18 and over, there were 91.5 males.

The median income for a household in the town was $39,375, and the median income for a family was $51,250. Males had a median income of $32,500 versus $20,625 for females. The per capita income for the town was $22,135. None of the families and 2.1% of the population were living below the poverty line, including no under eighteens and 6.1% of those over 64.

== Education ==
Students living in Taylorsville attend schools within the Bartow County School District.

- Euharlee Elementary School
- Taylorsville Elementary School
- Woodland Middle School (in Euharlee)
- Woodland High School (in Cartersville)

A few students living in a portion of Taylorsville that extends into Polk County attend schools within the Polk County School District.

== Healthcare ==
Floyd Primary Care Center serves residents within the Taylorsville and Rockmart area. The center also holds the Center for Diabetes of Taylorsville.

Three area hospitals serve residents of Taylorsville.

- Cartersville Medical Center, in Cartersville, now Piedmont.
- Floyd Medical Center, in Rome, now Atrium Health .
- Redmond Regional Medical Center, in Rome, now Advent Health.

Emergency services in Taylorsville are primarily provided by the Bartow County Fire Department and EMS.

== Georgia Power Plant Bowen ==
Plant Bowen is a coal-fired power station located near Taylorsville. It is approximately 8.7 mi (14 km) west-south-west from Cartersville in western Bartow County. At 3,499 megawatts, Plant Bowen has the second largest generating capacity of any coal-fired power plant in North America, and the largest in the United States; only Ontario Power Generation's Nanticoke Generating Station in Canada has more generating capacity. Plant Bowen ranked third in the nation for net generation in 2006 producing over 22,630,000 MWh. The station is connected to the southeastern power grid by numerous 500 kV transmission lines, and is owned and operated by Georgia Power, a subsidiary of Southern Company.

== Notable people ==
- John H. Holland (1857–1934), Arkansas state representative and senator
- Willard Nixon (1928–2000), Boston Red Sox player
- Charlie Sproull (1919–1980), Philadelphia Phillies player
