= Senator Holland (disambiguation) =

Spessard Holland (1892–1971) was a U.S. Senator from Florida from 1946 to 1971. Senator Holland may also refer to:

- Bruce Holland (American politician) (born 1968), Arkansas State Senate
- Clarence A. Holland (1929–2023), Virginia State Senate
- Edward E. Holland (1861–1941), Virginia State Senate
- Edward F. Holland (1931/32–2015), Rhode Island State Senate
- Edward M. Holland (born 1939), Virginia State Senate
- Elmer J. Holland (1894–1968), Pennsylvania State Senate
- James Holland (North Carolina politician) (1754–1823), North Carolina State Senate
- John H. Holland (politician) (1857–1934), Arkansas State Senate
- Joseph R. Holland (born 1936), New York State Senate
- Richard J. Holland (1925–2000), Virginia Senate
- Roger Holland (born 1962), Alaska State Senate
- Tom Holland (politician) (born 1961), Kansas State Senate
