= Shirley T. Holland =

American banker and politician (1896–1983)

Member of the Virginia House of Delegates for Isle of Wight, Nansemond, and Suffolk
- In office January 9, 1946 – January 12, 1966
- Preceded by: E. H. Williams Jr.

Personal details
- Born: Shirley Thomas Holland; October 8, 1896 Holland, Virginia, U.S.
- Died: May 12, 1983 (aged 86) Windsor, Virginia, U.S.
- Party: Democratic
- Spouse: Gladyse Joyner (m. 1920)
- Children: 4, including Richard and Clarence
- Education: Elon College; Massey Business College
- Occupation: Banker; insurance executive; politician

Military service
- Branch/service: United States Army
- Rank: Corporal
- Unit: Motor Transport Corps
- Battles/wars: World War I

Shirley Thomas Holland (October 8, 1896 – May 12, 1983) was an American banker, insurance executive, and Democratic Party politician, who served 10 terms as a member of the Virginia House of Delegates.
