= Tellus Science Museum =

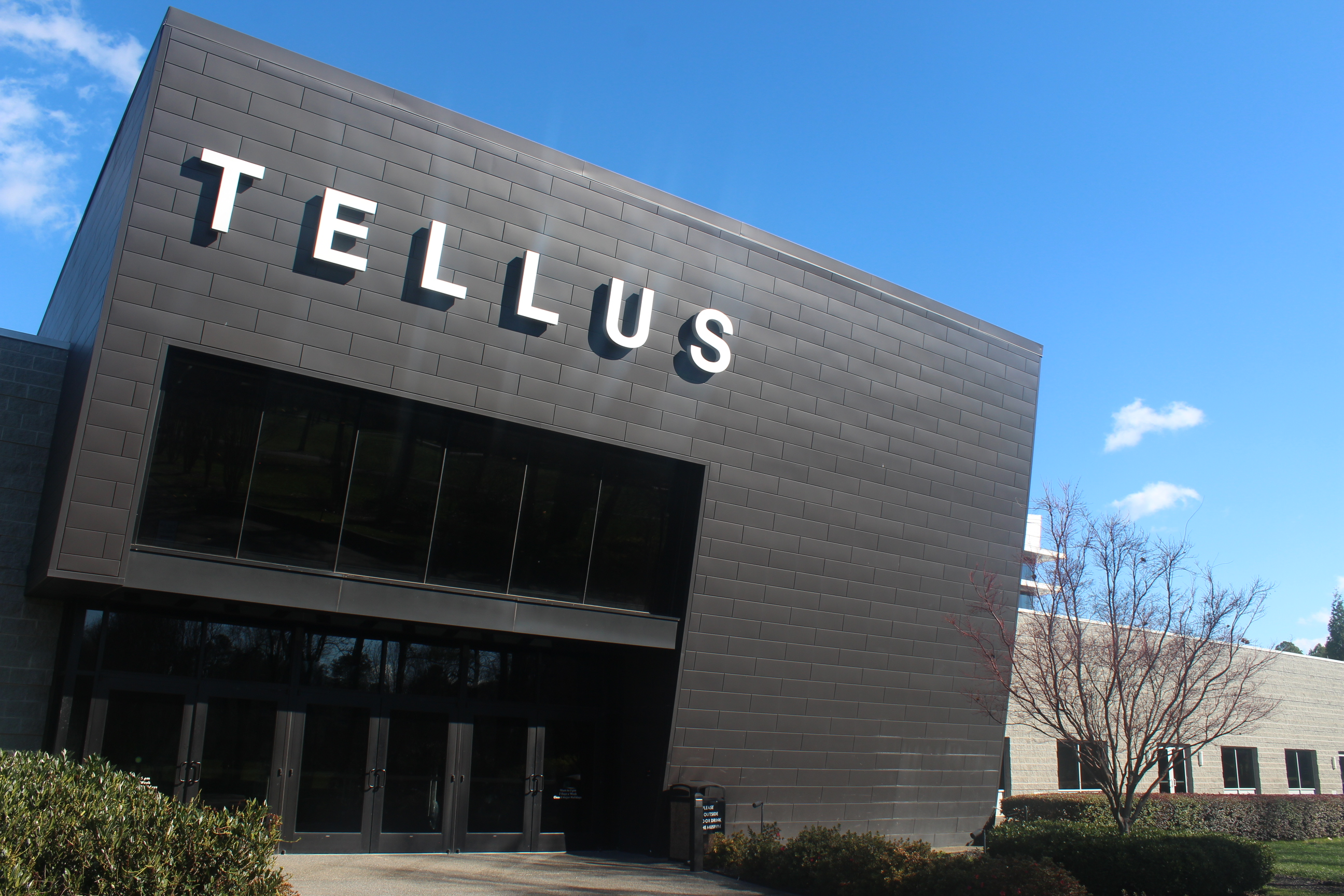
- Former name: Weinman Mineral Museum
- Established: 1 April 1974
- Location: 100 Tellus Drive; White, Georgia
- Coordinates: 34.24216°N 84.77084°W
- Type: Science museum
- Key holdings: Weinman Mineral Gallery; The Fossil Gallery; Science in Motion; Collins Family My Big Backyard; Traveling Exhibits Gallery; Replaced by the Smartphone Gallery
- Collections: Minerals and fossils
- Collection size: 120,000 square feet (11,000 m^{2})
- Director: Adam Wade
- Parking: Large lots on site
- Website: Tellus Science Museum

Tellus Science Museum is a natural history and science museum near Cartersville, Georgia, United States, with a facility of over 120,000 square feet (11,000 m^{2}). It is an affiliate of the Smithsonian Institution. The museum holds multiple special events throughout the year, many revolving around the Bentley Planetarium and observatory facility. The largest displays consist of a large fossil exhibit and mineral gallery.

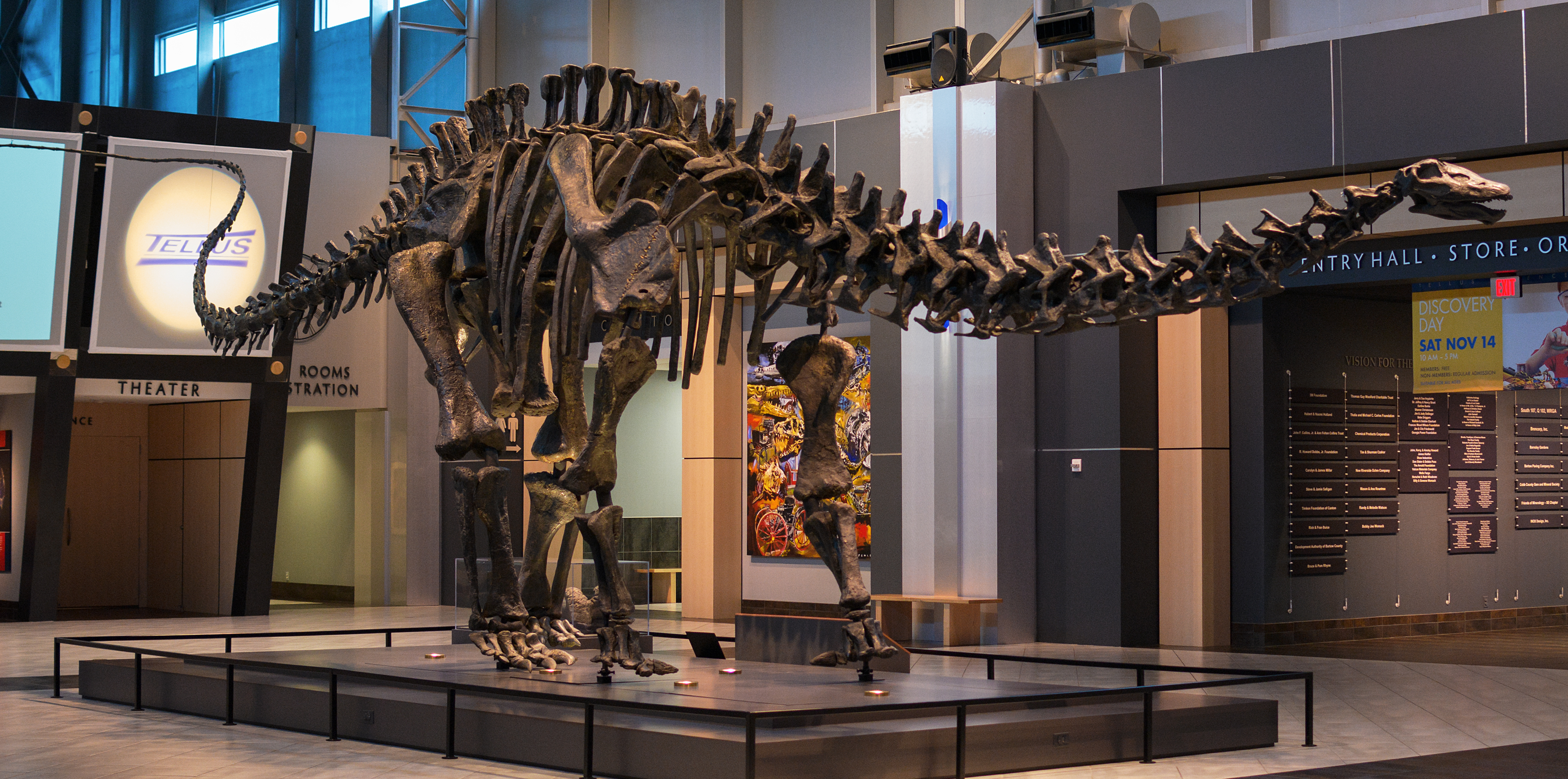
Brontosaurus skeleton in the main lobby

== Facility contents ==
- Weinman Mineral Gallery
- Fossil Gallery, with well-detailed casts of Mesozoic land and marine creatures
- Millar Science in Motion Gallery, exhibiting past and modern transportation displays
- Collins Family My Big Backyard, exhibiting hands-on experiments with light, sound, magnetism and electricity
- Bentley Planetarium
- Observatory, with a 20-inch (51 cm) Planewave reflecting telescope and a Coronado solar scope
- Theater
- Banquet halls
- The Vault, sub-gallery featuring local mineral, paleontological and archeological treasures
- The Crossroads Gallery, featuring recent to modern marvels
- West Virginia University Solar House, built by university students for the 2015 U.S. Department of Energy Solar Decathlon
- Tellus West Galleries, one featuring traveling exhibitions and one permanent gallery, the Replaced by the Smartphone gallery

== History ==
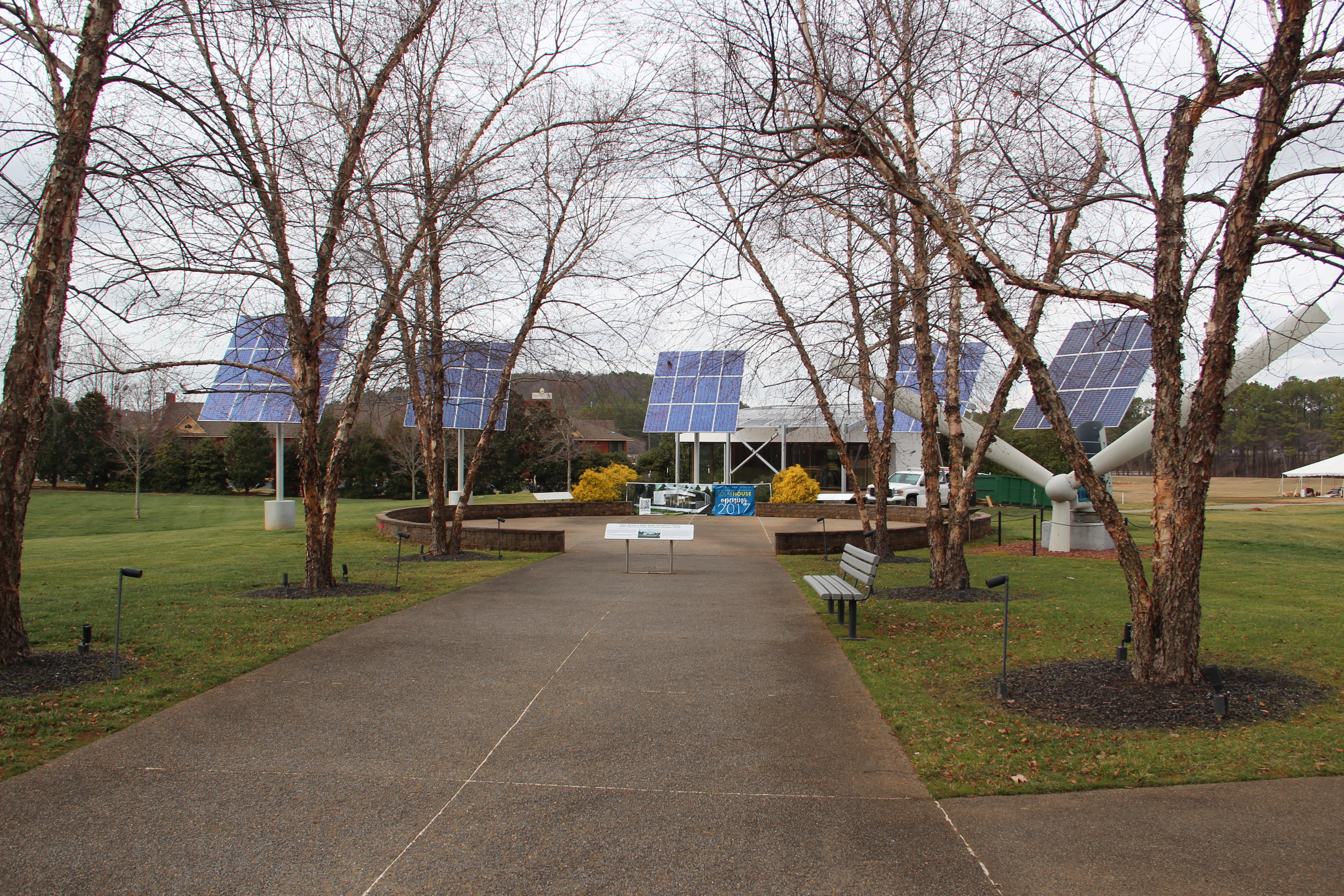
Solar arrays at the museum

Tellus was founded as the Weinman Mineral Museum in 1983, which closed in 2007 and reopened as Tellus Science Museum in 2009. The museum retains the original mineral displays in the Weinman Mineral Gallery.
