= Vic Beasley =

American football player (born 1992)

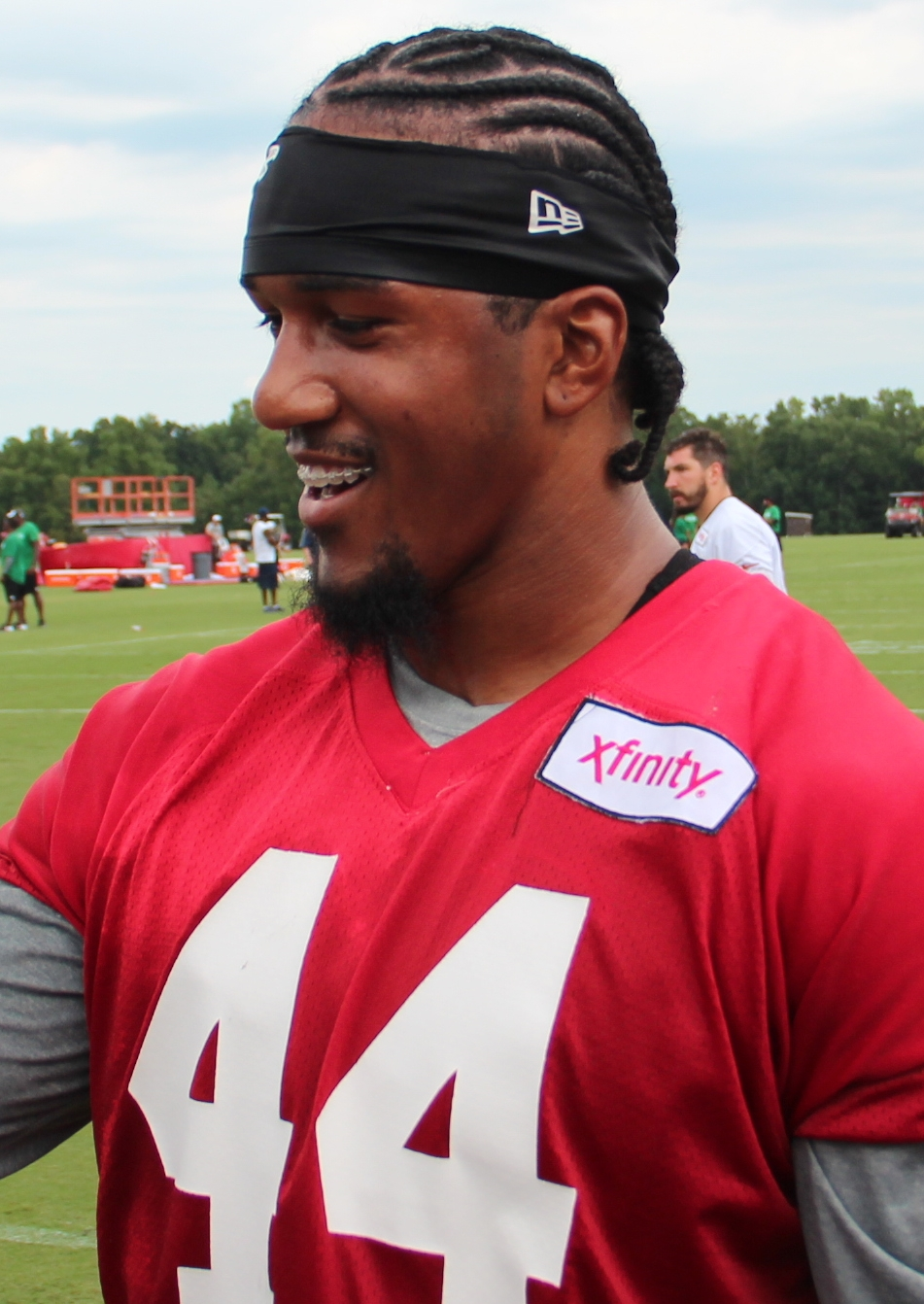
- Beasley with the Atlanta Falcons in 2015

Profile
- Position: Linebacker

Personal information
- Born: July 8, 1992 (age 34); Adairsville, Georgia, U.S.
- Listed height: 6 ft 3 in (1.91 m)
- Listed weight: 246 lb (112 kg)

Career information
- High school: Adairsville
- College: Clemson (2010–2014)
- NFL draft: 2015: 1st round, 8th overall pick

Career history
- Atlanta Falcons (2015–2019); Tennessee Titans (2020); Las Vegas Raiders (2020); Vegas Vipers (2023); Arlington Renegades (2024)

Awards and highlights
- First-team All-Pro (2016); Pro Bowl (2016); Deacon Jones Award (2016); NFL forced fumbles co-leader (2016); 2× Consensus All-American (2013, 2014); ACC Defensive Player of the Year (2014); 2× First-team All-ACC (2013, 2014)

Career NFL statistics
- Total tackles: 160
- Sacks: 37.5
- Forced fumbles: 12
- Pass deflections: 12
- Interceptions: 1
- Defensive touchdowns: 2
- Stats at Pro Football Reference

Victor Ramon Beasley Jr. (born July 8, 1992) is an American professional football linebacker. After playing college football for Clemson University, Beasley was selected by the Atlanta Falcons with the eighth overall pick in the 2015 NFL draft.

Beasley was a consensus All-American for the Tigers in 2013 and 2014. He is also the school's all-time sack leader (33). Following Beasley's senior season, he was named ACC Defensive Player of the Year. In 2016, Beasley was named to his first Pro Bowl and All-Pro honors, following his league-leading 15.5 sack season.

== Early life ==
Beasley attended Adairsville High School in Adairsville, Georgia, where he was a three-sport standout in football, basketball, and track. He played as running back and linebacker for the Adairsville Tigers high school football team. He was named All-county and All-area in both his junior and senior seasons. As a junior, he totaled 57 tackles, two recovered fumbles and an interception, while also hauling in 15 receptions for over 200 yards. As a senior, he had 120 rushes for 828 yards with seven touchdowns on offense, and had 102 tackles (12 for loss) and an interception on the defensive side of the ball. In addition, he also had seven punt returns for a 17.3-yard average and two touchdowns, and also returned a kickoff return 80 yards for a score. He was named first-team All-state by Associated Press (AP) and Georgia Sportswriters Association. He also played in the Georgia North-South All-Star game, where he had a blocked field goal.

In addition to football, Beasley competed in track & field while at Adairsville, where he competed mainly in sprints and jumps. At the 2010 GHSAA Regional 7-AA Championships, he placed third in the high jump (6–0 or 1.84m) and second in the triple jump (44–0 or 13.44m), while also earning a third-place finish in the 100-meter dash race after running a personal-best time of 11.14 seconds.

Considered a four-star recruit by ESPN.com, Beasley was listed as the No. 19 athlete in the nation in 2010. He was rated as the No. 37 athlete in the nation and No. 37 player in Georgia by Rivals.com. He was considered the No. 34 outside linebacker in the nation and No. 37 player in Georgia by Scout.com. Also an All-Southeast Region pick and the No. 33 player in the state according to SuperPrep. Beasley chose Clemson over Alabama and Auburn.

== College career ==
Upon arriving at Clemson in 2010, Beasley was redshirted. He began working as a tight end. Due to Beasley's size and speed, he was also used as a scout team quarterback in his redshirt year.

As a redshirt freshman in 2011, Beasley played sparingly. In nine games, he only played 16 snaps and recorded two tackles on the season.

As a sophomore in 2012, Beasley recorded eight sacks. He was named an Honorable Mention Sophomore All-American by College Football News.

Through the first six games of his junior season in 2013, Beasley led the nation in sacks with 13. Beasley was a first-team All-Atlantic Coast Conference (ACC) selection and was named a consensus All-American. Beasley and the Tigers upset #6 Ohio State Buckeyes in the Orange Bowl.

Beasley opted to stay for his senior year in 2014 to finish his education instead of declaring for the 2014 NFL draft. He was projected to have been picked up in the second round as predicted by the NFL Draft Advisory Board. Beasley entered the year with 21 career sacks, which was seven away from setting the all-time school record for career which was set by Michael Dean Perry and Gaines Adams at 28. In October, he broke the record. He was named the ACC Defensive Player of the Year and was again a consensus All-American.

== Professional career ==
Pre-draft measurables
Height	Weight	Arm length	Hand span	40-yard dash	10-yard split	20-yard split	20-yard shuttle	Three-cone drill	Vertical jump	Broad jump	Bench press
6 ft 3 in (1.91 m)	246 lb (112 kg)	32 1/2 in (0.83 m)	9 3/8 in (0.24 m)	4.53 s	1.59 s	2.65 s	4.15 s	6.91 s	41 in (1.04 m)	10 ft 10 in (3.30 m)	35 reps
All values from NFL Combine

=== Atlanta Falcons ===
==== 2015 season ====
Prior to the draft, Beasley was praised for being an explosive athlete who was always first off the snap. Many scouts viewed him as a true edge bender who could torque his hips and shoulders to turn the corner. He was also recognized for his ankle flexion to dip and slalom around the corner at difficult angles to block. On the other hand, critics said Beasley lacked ideal arm length. They said he was too often content to stay blocked if his pass rush stalled out. Others said he needed to shed blocks more consistently against run. While many noted his good football character, some scouts were concerned about a lack of alpha-dog tenacity. Beasley was selected with the eighth overall pick by the Atlanta Falcons in the 2015 NFL draft. He was Clemson's highest selected defensive player since the late defensive end Gaines Adams went fourth overall to the Tampa Bay Buccaneers in 2007.

On June 12, 2015, Beasley agreed to terms his rookie contract.

In Week 2 of his rookie season, Beasley recorded his first career sack, taking down New York Giants quarterback Eli Manning, before generating his second sack the following week against Brandon Weeden of the Dallas Cowboys. In Week 16 against the undefeated Carolina Panthers, Beasley made a strip-sack of Cam Newton in the final minutes of the game, securing a 20–13 upset of the Panthers and ruining the Panther's undefeated season.

==== 2016 season ====
In 2016, Beasley moved from defensive end to the strongside linebacker position. He recorded his first sack of the 2016 season in Week 2 against the Oakland Raiders. Beasley had a breakout game in Week 5 of the 2016 season, playing the Denver Broncos, Beasley recorded eight total tackles, 3.5 sacks, and two forced fumbles. He was named National Football Conference (NFC) Defensive Player of the Week for Week 14 due to his performance against the Los Angeles Rams where he had three sacks and fumble return touchdown. He was named NFC Defensive Player of the Month for December. Due to his performance during the 2016 season, Beasley was selected to his first Pro Bowl, but did not participate due to the Falcons making Super Bowl LI. Beasley ended the season with a league-leading 15.5 sacks. He was named First team All-Pro, and was ranked 40th by his peers on the NFL Top 100 Players of 2017.

==== 2017 season ====
In Week 2, in the 34–23 victory over the Green Bay Packers, Beasley sacked Packers quarterback Aaron Rodgers and forced a fumble, which was recovered by teammate Desmond Trufant for a touchdown. However, in the game, he suffered a hamstring injury, and was ruled out for a month. On the season, Beasley played in 14 games with eight starts, recording 29 tackles and only five sacks after being moved from defensive end to outside linebacker.

==== 2018 season ====
On April 25, 2018, the Falcons exercised the fifth-year option on Beasley's contract. He played in 16 games with nine starts, recording 20 combined tackles, five sacks, and three passes defensed.

==== 2019 season ====
In Week 2 against the Philadelphia Eagles, Beasley recorded his first sack of the season in the 24–20 win. In Week 14 against the Panthers, Beasley recorded two sacks, one of which was a strip sack that was recovered by teammate Tyeler Davison, in the 40–20 win. Beasley played in 16 games with 15 starts, recording 42 combined tackles, eight sacks, and two forced fumbles. After the season, the Falcons announced that they would not re-sign him. He became an unrestricted free agent at the beginning of the new league year on March 18, 2020.

=== Tennessee Titans ===
On March 31, 2020, Beasley signed a one-year contract with the Tennessee Titans. He was placed on the reserve/did not report list at the start of training camp on July 28. He reported to the Titans on August 7 and was moved back to the active roster. He was placed on the active/non-football injury list on August 11. Beasley was activated on September 5. Beasley was waived by the Titans on November 4 after recording only three tackles through seven games.

=== Las Vegas Raiders ===
On November 23, 2020, Beasley was signed to the practice squad of the Las Vegas Raiders. He was elevated to the active roster on December 5 and 12 for the team's Weeks 13 and 14 games against the New York Jets and Indianapolis Colts, and reverted to the practice squad after each game. On December 15, Beasley was promoted to the active roster. In the 2020 season, Beasley appeared in ten games and finished with four total tackles and a forced fumble.

=== Vegas Vipers ===
Beasley was selected by the Vegas Vipers of the XFL with the first overall pick in the 2023 XFL Defensive Front Seven Draft. The Vipers folded when the XFL and USFL merged to create the United Football League (UFL).

=== Arlington Renegades ===
On January 5, 2024, Beasley was selected by the Arlington Renegades during the 2024 UFL dispersal draft. He signed with the team on January 31.

== Career statistics ==
Legend
	Led the league
**Bold**	Career high

=== NFL ===
==== Regular season ====
Season				Tackling				Fumbles				Interceptions			
Year	Team	GP	GS	Comb	Solo	Asst	Sack	FF	FR	Yds	TD	Int	Yds	TD	PD
2015	ATL	16	16	26	20	6	4.0	2	0	0	0	**1**	**1**	0	**3**
2016	ATL	16	12	39	**32**	7	**15.5**	**6**	**1**	21	**1**	0	0	0	2
2017	ATL	14	8	29	23	6	5.0	1	0	0	0	0	0	0	2
2018	ATL	16	9	20	16	4	5.0	0	**1**	**74**	**1**	0	0	0	**3**
2019	ATL	16	15	**42**	28	**14**	8.0	2	0	0	0	0	0	0	2
2020	TEN	5	0	3	2	1	0.0	1	0	0	0	0	0	0	0
2020	LVR	5	0	1	1	0	0.0	0	0	0	0	0	0	0	0
Career		88	60	160	122	38	37.5	12	2	95	2	1	1	0	12

==== Postseason ====
Year	Team	Games		Tackles					Fumbles						
Year	Team	GP	GS	Comb	Solo	Asst	Sack	FF	FR	Yds	TD	Int	Yds	TD	PD
2016	ATL	3	2	2	0	**2**	0	0	0	0	0	0	0	0	**2**
2017	ATL	2	2	**6**	**5**	1	**1**	**1**	0	0	0	0	0	0	1
Career		5	4	8	5	3	1	1	0	0	0	0	0	0	3

=== XFL ===
Season				Tackling			Fumbles			Interceptions		
Year	Team	GP	Solo	Asst	Sack	TFL	FF	FR	TD	Int	Yds	TD
2023	Vipers	10	6	9	0.5	3	0	2	0	0	0	0

=== College ===
Season	Team	GP	Solo	Ast	Cmb	TfL	Sck	Int	Yds	Avg	TD	PD	FR	Yds	TD	FF
2011	Clemson	9	1	0	1	0.0	0	0	0	0	0	0	0	0	0	0
2012	Clemson		12	2	14	8	8	0	0	0	0	0	0	0	0	1
2013	Clemson	12	**31**	**9**	**40**	**22.5**	**13**	0	0	0	0	**5**	**1**	0	0	**4**
2014	Clemson	11	23	5	28	17.5	9	0	0	0	0	2	**1**	**16**	1	2
Total			67	16	83	48	30	0	0	0	0	7	2	53	1	7
