= Adairsville High School =

Public school in Georgia, United States

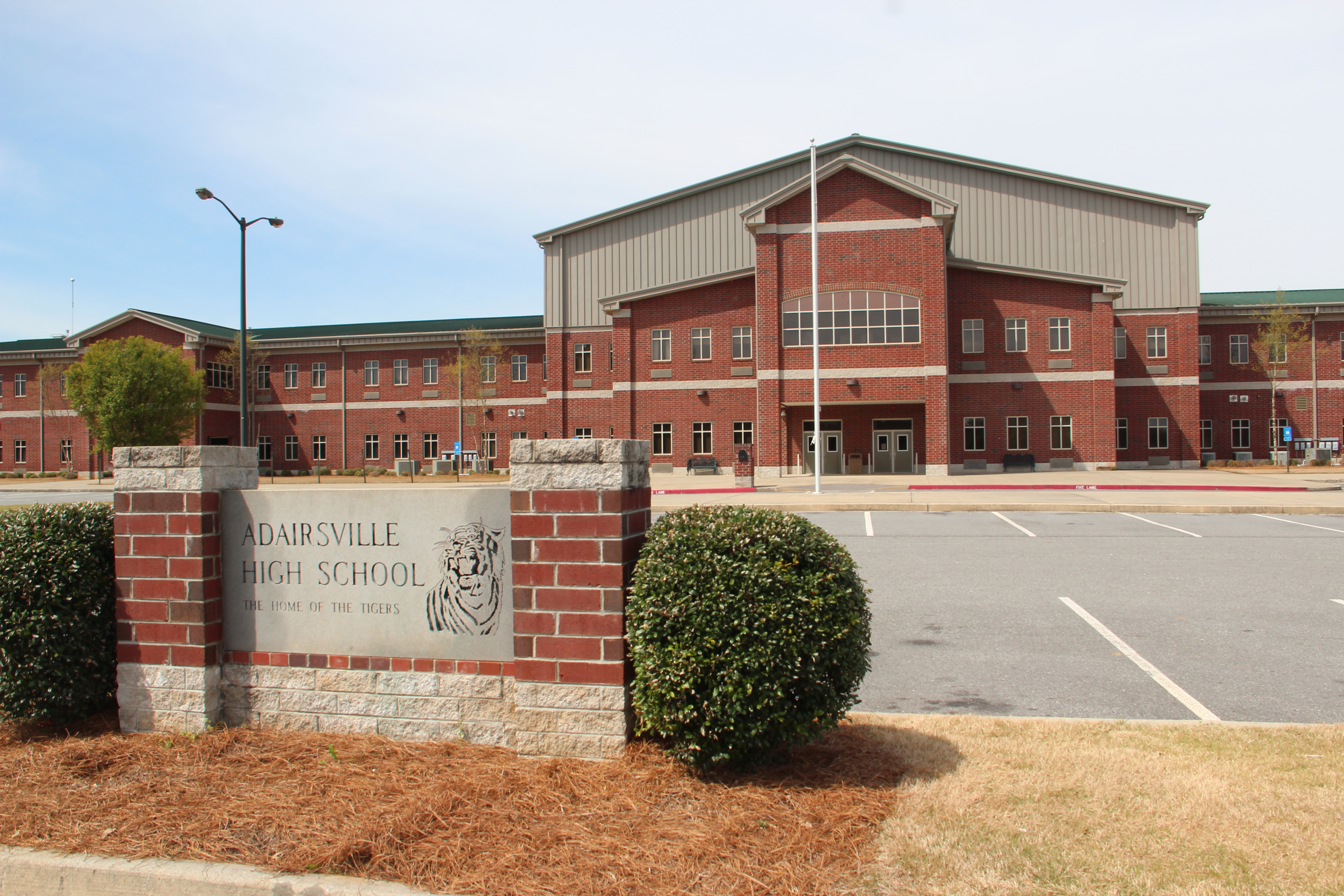
- Adairsville High School in 2015

Location
- 519 Old Highway 41; Adairsville, Georgia 30103; United States; 34°20′23″N 84°54′59″W

Information
- Type: Public secondary school
- School district: Bartow County School District
- CEEB code: 110010
- Principal: Tony Stanfill
- Teaching staff: 68.50 (on an FTE basis)
- Grades: 9 to 12
- Enrollment: 1,233 (2023–2024)
- Student to teacher ratio: 18.00
- Colors: Green, white, Vegas gold
- Athletics conference: GHSA Region 6-AAA
- Nickname: Tigers
- Accreditation: Cognia
- Website: www.bartow.k12.ga.us/o/adairsville-high/

Adairsville High School is a public high school located in Adairsville, Georgia, United States. It serves grades 9–12 for the Bartow County School District.

== Academics ==
Adairsville High School has been accredited by Cognia or its predecessors since 1956. In the U.S. News & World Report 2020 annual survey of public high schools, Adairsville ranked 253rd in Georgia and 11,033rd nationally.

== Athletics ==
The Adairsville Tigers play in the GHSA's AAA division.

== Notable alumni ==
- Vic Beasley – National Football League (NFL) defensive end
