= Woodland High School (Cartersville, Georgia) =

Public school in Georgia, United States

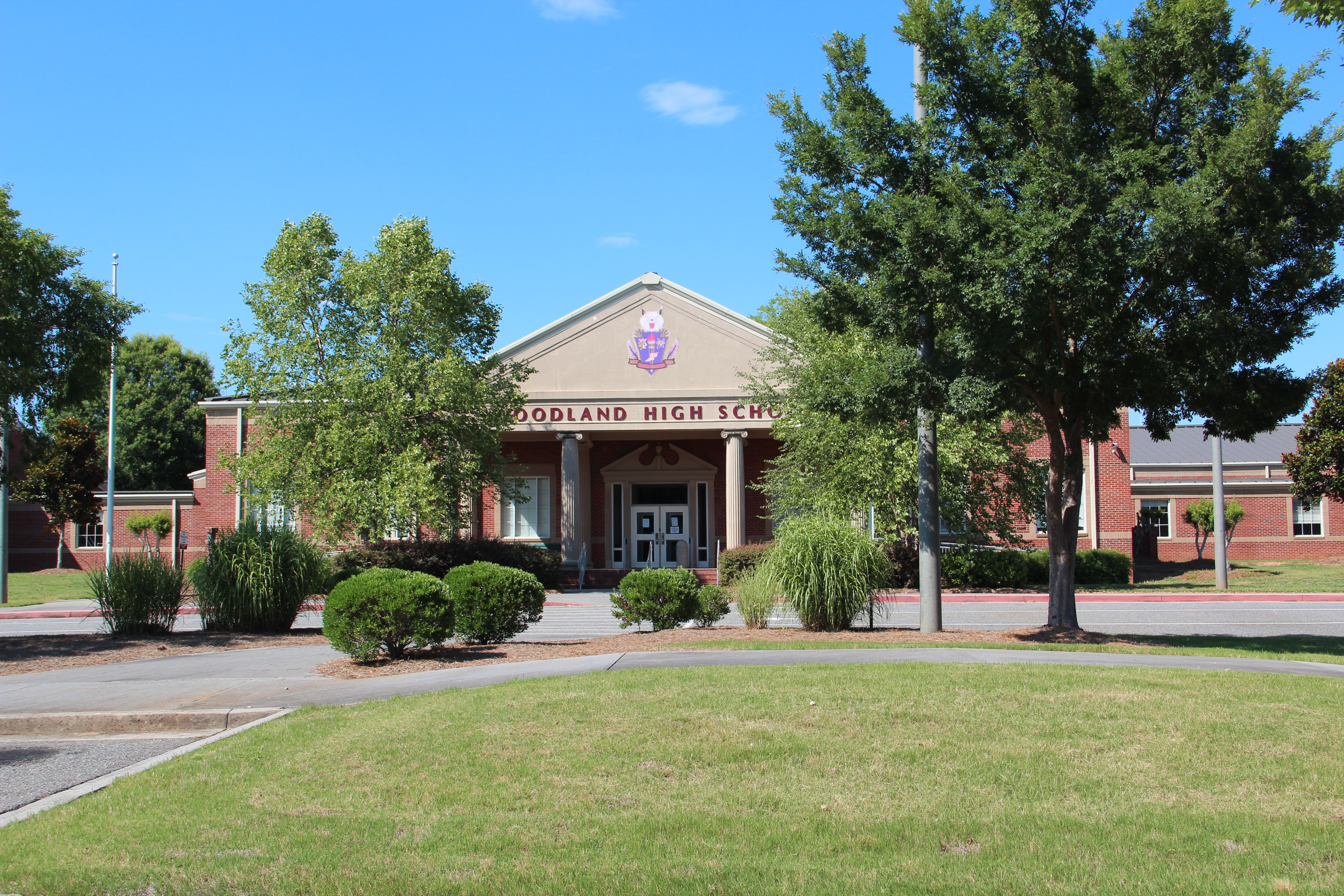

Location
- 800 Old Alabama Road; Cartersville, Georgia 30120; United States; 34°07′12″N 84°49′59″W

Information
- Funding type: Public
- Established: 1997 (29 years ago)
- Founder: Nettie Holt
- Status: Open
- School district: Bartow County Schools
- NCES District ID: 1300330
- Superintendent: Clint Terza
- CEEB code: 110619
- NCES School ID: 130033001914
- Principal: Melinda Wilder
- Teaching staff: 85.20 (FTE)
- Grades: 9 to 12
- Enrollment: 1,501 (2023-2024)
- Student to teacher ratio: 17.62
- Campus size: 121 acres
- Houses: Main, Healthcare Sciences, Performing Arts Center, 9th Grade Academy, Gym, and Auxiliary Gym
- Colors: Navy blue, cardinal red, and silver
- Athletics conference: GHSA Class AAAAA Region 5 Sub-Region A
- Team name: Woodland Wildcats
- Rival: Cass Colonels
- Website: www.bartow.k12.ga.us/o/woodland-high

Woodland High School is a public high school in Bartow County, Georgia, United States, serving grades 9 through 12. Student enrolment in 2019 was 1,511.

== History ==
Woodland High School was founded in 1997, the third high school built in Bartow County. It is located on a 121-acre campus in the foothills of the Appalachian Mountains, on the Etowah River in Cartersville, Georgia.

The school's founder and first principal was Nettie Holt.

== Academics ==
In 2019 Woodland High School had a graduation rate of 83%, the highest among Bartow County's high schools. In 2017, 13% of Woodland High School students were enrolled in least one Advanced Placement (AP) course during the school year; the median across high schools that offer AP courses in Georgia was 16%. 12% of students of Woodland High School were learning-disabled, slightly above the median of 11% across high schools in Georgia. Woodland High School's average SAT score is 1,469 compared to Georgia's 1,407. The school's average ACT score is 20, which mirrors the state average.

Advanced Placement courses are offered in Social Studies, Sciences and Mathematics. Woodland also has courses and programs in health sciences, agriculture, physical exercise, criminal justice, foreign languages, band/color guard, chorus, dance, drama, and theatre.

== Student demographics ==
As of 2019, Woodland's student body was 77.7% White, 6.2% African American, 12.9% Hispanic, 0.3% Asian, 0.1% American Indian and 2.1% two or more races. 44% of Woodland's students are eligible to participate in the National School Lunch Program (NSLP).

Woodland High School's student body was 51% female, 49% male in 2013.

== Campus facilities ==
Woodland's main classroom building houses the front offices, nurse's office, weight room, dance room, cafeteria, campus police, two gyms, and the newly built 9th Grade Academy.

Students first attended the free-standing 9th Grade Academy in the 2009-10 school year. It is a two-story building which can hold 100-125 students.

Woodland High School is home to Cartersville's Performing Arts Center (PAC). The PAC seats 1,000 guests and includes a vast pre-function lobby space, two ticket/concession windows, and a large backstage rooms for mounting big stage productions. The Woodland PAC has hosted the Miss Georgia USA Pageants and many other musical, theatrical, and ballet performances.

While basketball games and classes are held in both gyms, the main gym hosts the varsity basketball games, wrestling matches, cheerleading competitions, and other ceremonies. The school's outdoor athletic facilities include the football/soccer field and their practice field; baseball and softball fields; the tennis courts and the track; and the field house, where athletes change clothes, prepare for games and meets, and where the football coaches' offices are.

== Macy's Thanksgiving Day parade ==
On November 22, 2018, Woodland High School's Wildcat Marching Band represented the State of Georgia in the 92nd Annual Macy's Thanksgiving Day Parade in New York City. The three-hour Macy's event is held in Manhattan starting at 9:00 a.m. Eastern Standard Time on Thanksgiving Day, and has been televised nationally on NBC since 1952.

Woodland High School previously performed in the 2013 Macy's Holiday Parade at Universal Studios in Orlando, Florida.

== Athletics ==
Woodland High School's athletics are in Classification AAAAA and in Region 7 as of the 2014-15 school year.

=== Interscholastic sports ===
Fall

- Boys' cross country
- Girls' cross country
- Football
- Volleyball
- Softball
- Cheerleading

Winter

- Boys' basketball
- Girls' basketball
- Boys' swimming
- Boys' diving
- Girls' swimming
- Girls' diving
- Wrestling

Spring

- Baseball
- Golf
- Boys' tennis
- Girls' tennis
- Boys' soccer
- Girls' soccer
- Track

=== Achievements ===
Woodland's golf team won the Region 5-AAAAA golf tournament in 2013.

The Woodland Lady Wildcats girls' soccer team set a record with most wins in a season with their 7-0 victory over Hiram in 2013.

In 2011, the Wildcat Marching Band represented Georgia in the National Cherry Blossom Festival in Washington, DC.

In 2011, Woodland High School was chosen as High 5 Sports Team of The Week and was filmed live on Good Day Atlanta after winning with over 44,000 votes.
