= Folsom, Georgia =

Unincorporated community in Georgia, U.S.

Coordinates: 34°22′58″N 84°49′43″W

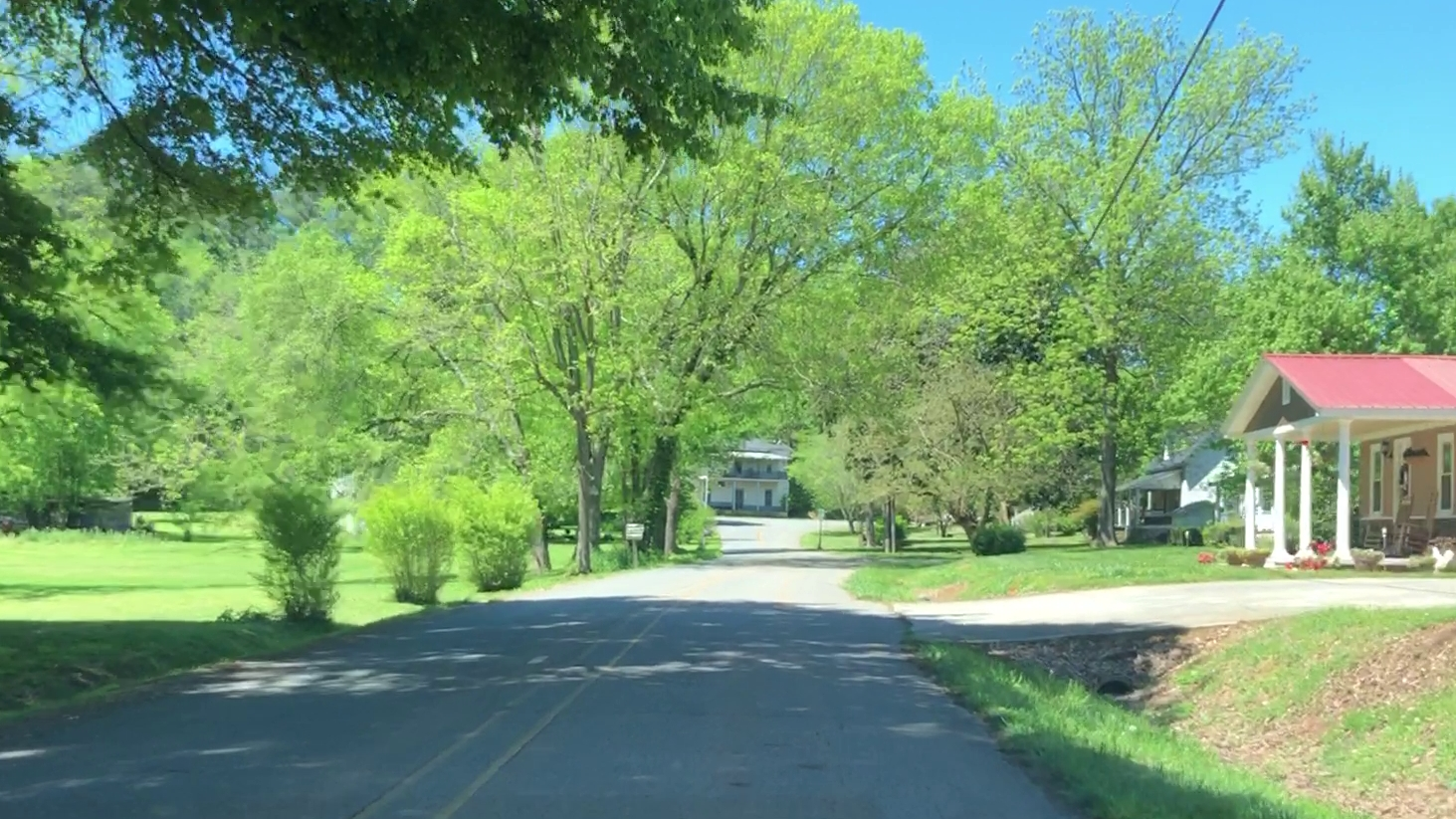
Folsom Glade Road in Folsom

Folsom is an unincorporated community in Bartow County, in the U.S. state of Georgia.

== History ==
A post office was established at Folsom in 1886, and remained in operation until it was discontinued in 1917. The community was named for Frances Folsom Cleveland, First Lady of the United States (1886–1889).
