= John H. Holland (politician) =

American politician (1857–1934)

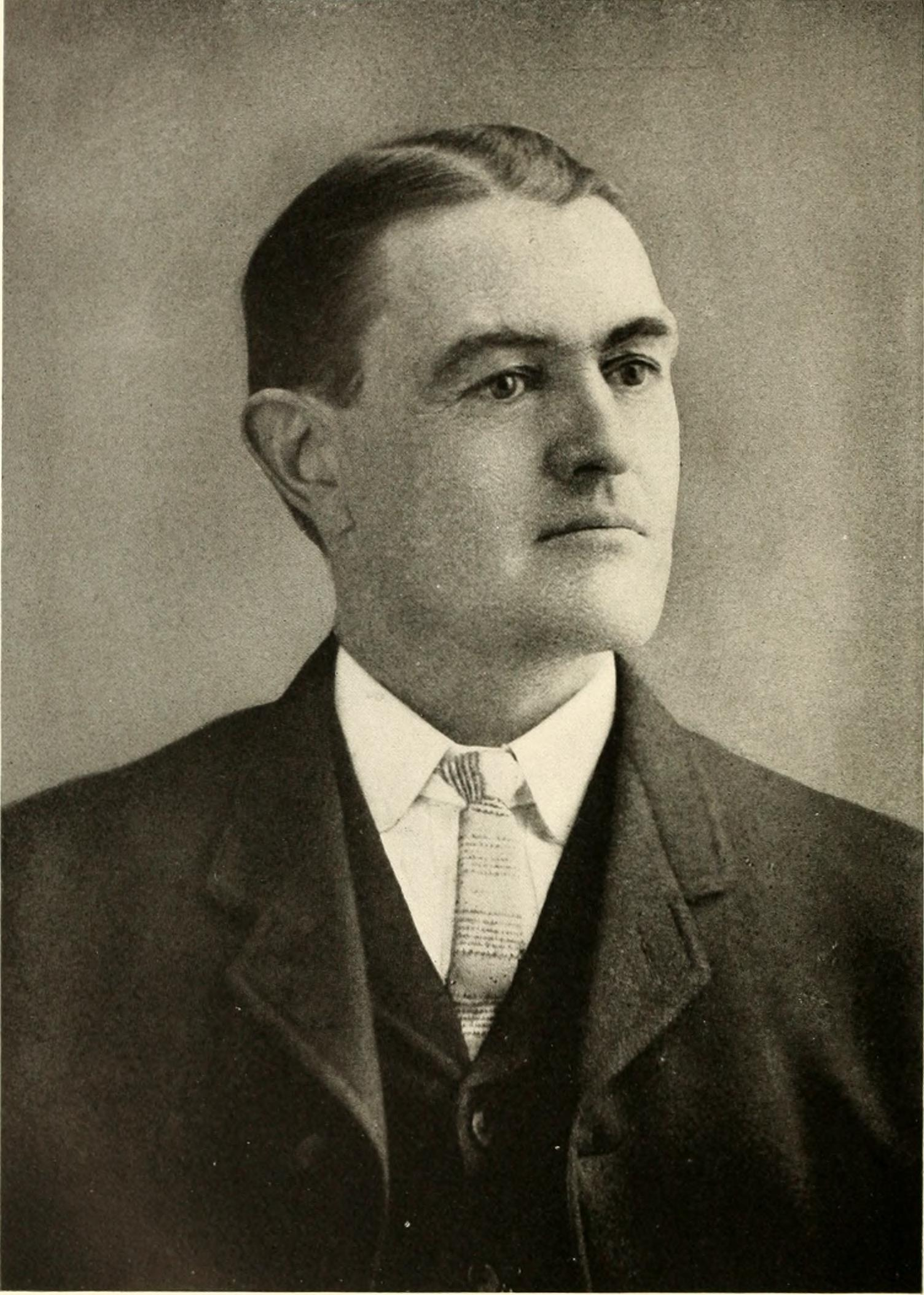
- Holland in a 1911 publication

Member of the Arkansas Senate from the 21st district
- In office January 9, 1905 – 1916

Member of the Arkansas House of Representatives from the Sebastian County district
- In office January 14, 1901 – 1904

Personal details
- Born: August 29, 1857 Taylorsville, Bartow County, Georgia, U.S.
- Died: March 31, 1934 (aged 76) Fort Smith, Arkansas, U.S.
- Resting place: Rose Lawn Cemetery
- Party: Democratic
- Spouses: Queen L. McMillan (m. 1880, died) Nannie Lipsey (m. 1889)
- Children: 2
- Education: Buckner College
- Occupation: Politician; lawyer
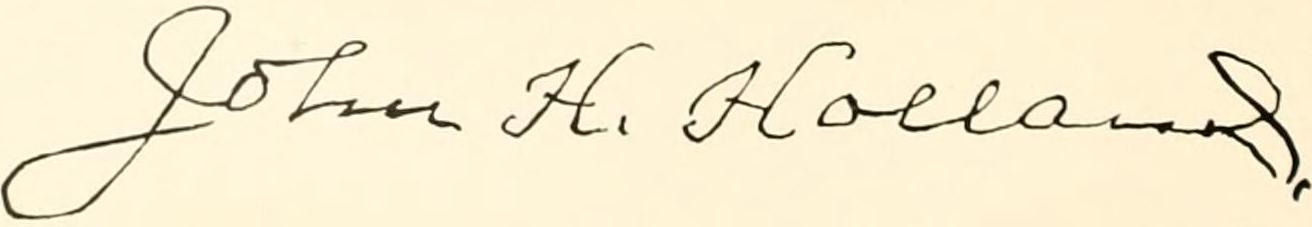
- Signature

John H. Holland (August 29, 1857 – March 31, 1934) was an American politician and lawyer from Arkansas. He served in the Arkansas House of Representatives from 1901 to 1904 and served in the Arkansas Senate from 1905 to 1916.

== Early life ==
John H. Holland was born on August 29, 1857, in Taylorsville, Bartow County, Georgia, to Elizabeth (née Wilson) and J. J. Holland. His father was a Baptist reverend and a soldier in the Confederate Army. In 1870, the family moved to a farm near Witcherville in Sebastian County, Arkansas. He attended public schools near Witcherville and Buckner College. He taught in public schools from 1879 to 1882. He studied law under Governor John S. Little in Greenwood. He was admitted to the bar in 1883 or 1886.

== Career ==
Holland moved to Greenwood and in 1886, he began practicing law there. He served as mayor of Greenwood for two terms. In the 1890s, he was a tax collector under sheriff John F. Williams. He was elected as a county judge in 1892. He was re-elected in 1894 and served until 1896.

Holland was a Democrat. He was elected to the Arkansas House of Representatives in 1900. He represented Sebastian County in that body from January 14, 1901, to 1904. He wrote the bill that established Labor Day in Arkansas, a screen mining bill, and a bill that required coal companies to pay their employees in currency or checks redeemable to money. He also passed a fellow servant bill, a bill that provided the election of the superintendent of the penitentiary, and a poison label bill.

Holland was elected to the Arkansas Senate in 1904. He represented the 21st district in the senate from January 9, 1905, to 1916. In 1907, he was chairman of the joint penitentiary committee. He served on the judiciary committee, in the house and senate, from the 1901 session to at least the 1911 session. In the 1911 session, he was chairman of the judiciary committee. He wrote the Employers' Liability Law. He wrote a bill to annex a strip of the Indian Territory to Arkansas. He also wrote a bill that provided the Supreme Court with a stenographer and a Sebastian County whiskey regulation bill. He wrote a bill to prohibit coal mining companies from undermining graveyards and a bill that prohibited shipping or piping of natural gas out of Arkansas. Following his political service, he continued to practice law.

In 1907, Holland was one of six members of the legislature arrested. He was indicted for perjury for claiming that fellow senator John A. Hinkle's testimony was false. He was associated with the Sebastian County Bank at Greenwood, the Farmers' Bank at Greenwood, and the Night and Day Bank at Fort Smith. He was a trustee of Buckner College.

== Personal life ==
Holland married Queen L. McMillan in 1880. They had two sons, Chester and W. Cleveland. His wife died and he later married Nannie Lipsey of Arkansas in 1889. Around 1912, he moved to Fort Smith. He was a member of the Baptist church. He was a Royal Arch Mason, a member of the Masonic lodge in Greenwood, a member of the Knights of Pythias, and was an Odd Fellow.

Holland died on March 31, 1934, at his home on Dodson Avenue in Fort Smith. He was buried in Rose Lawn Cemetery.
