= Rowland Springs, Georgia =

- Unincorporated community
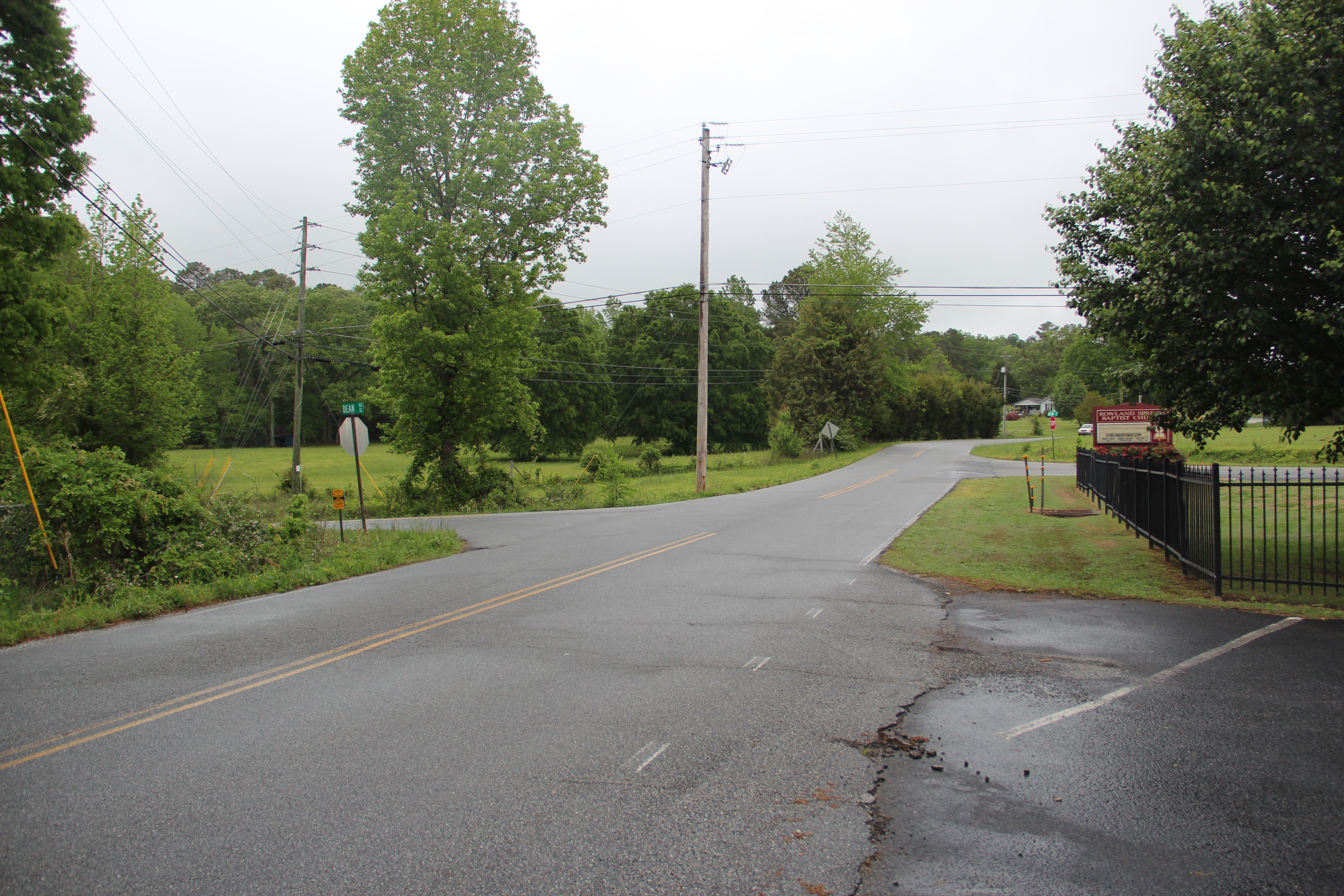
- Rowland Springs Road

- Location within the state of Georgia Rowland Springs, Georgia (the United States)
- Coordinates: 34.2195573°N 84.7502357°W
- Country: United States
- State: Georgia
- County: Bartow
- Elevation: 909 ft (277 m)
- Time zone: UTC-5 (Eastern (EST))
  - Summer (DST): UTC-4 (EDT)
- Area codes: 770, 678 & 470
- GNIS ID: 30121

Rowland Springs is an unincorporated community in Bartow County, Georgia, United States. It is located approximately five miles east of Cartersville with approximately ten subdivisions and churches, including Rowland Springs Baptist Church. It is situated off Rowland Springs Road and off Georgia State Route 20.

The community was named for John S. Rowland, who established a mineral spa at this site in the 1840s.
