= Pettit Creek =

Stream in Bartow County, Georgia, U.S.

Coordinates: 34°08′15″N 84°50′27″W

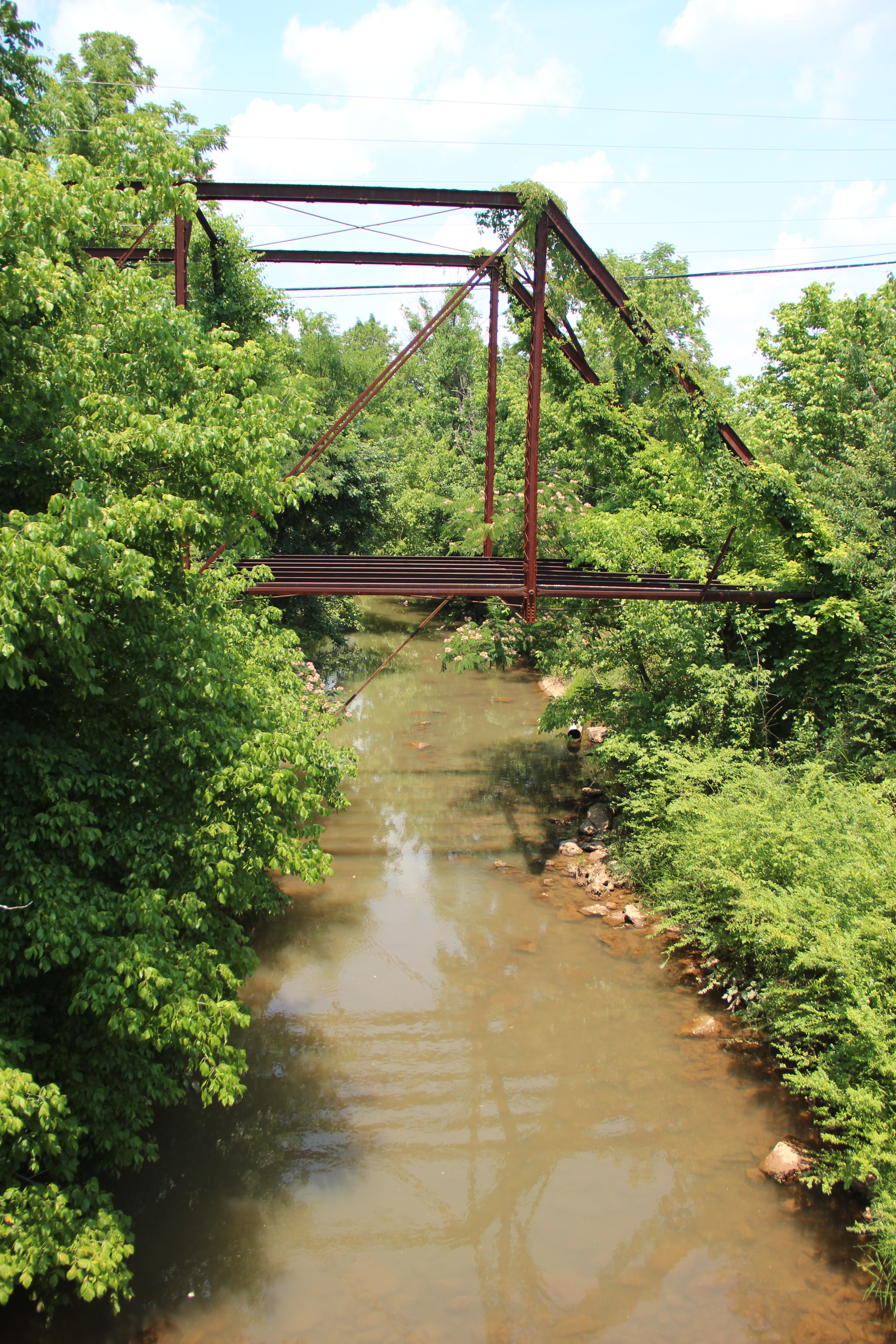
Petit Creek in Cartersville

Pettit Creek is a stream in Bartow County, Georgia. It is a tributary to the Etowah River.

Pettit was the name of a local Cherokee landowner.

== See also ==
- List of rivers of Georgia (U.S. state)
