= Stilesboro, Georgia =

- Unincorporated community
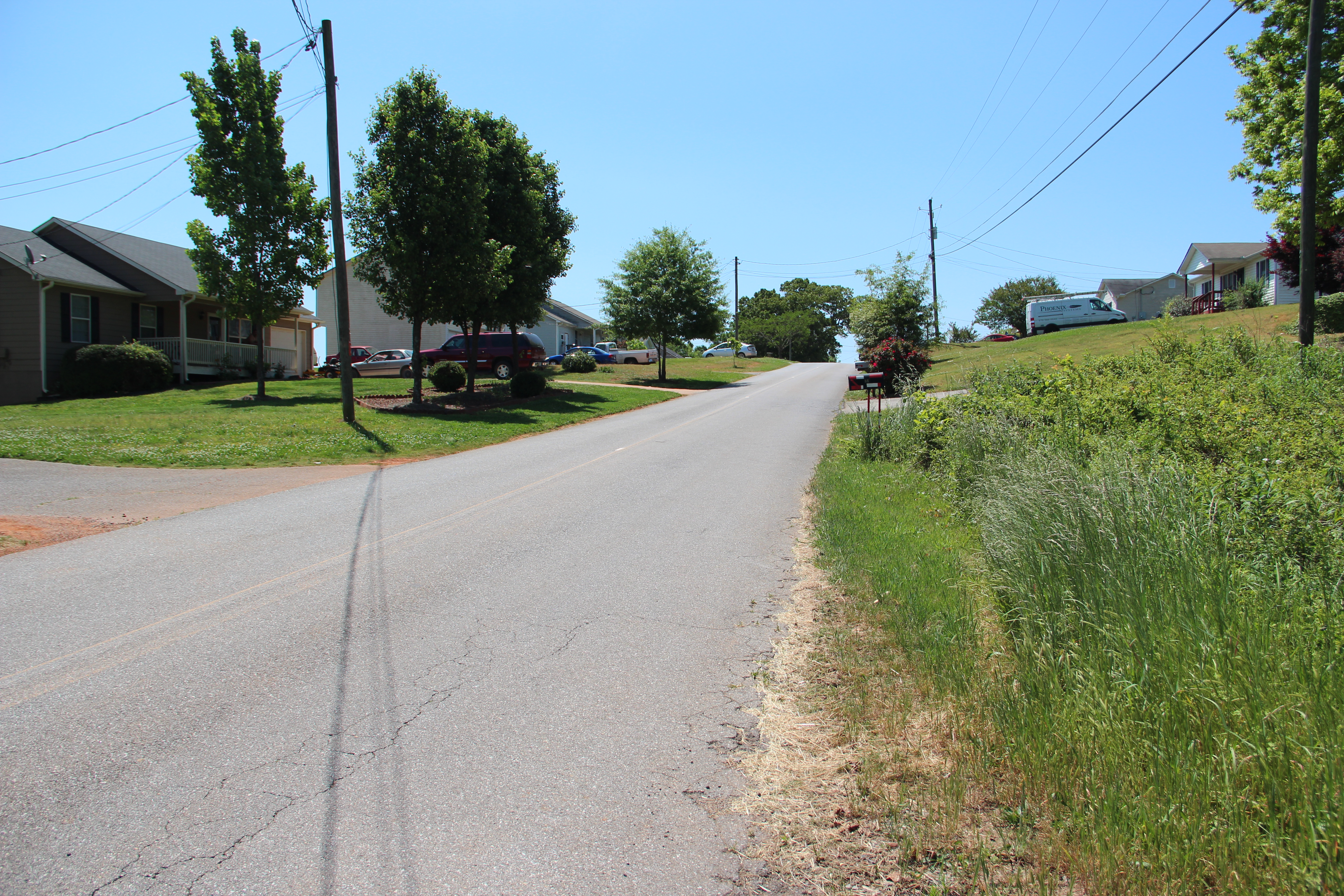
- Old Stilesboro Road

- Location within the state of Georgia Stilesboro, Georgia (the United States)
- Coordinates: 34°06′17″N 84°54′57″W
- Country: United States
- State: Georgia
- County: Bartow
- Elevation: 909 ft (277 m)
- Time zone: UTC-5 (Eastern (EST))
  - Summer (DST): UTC-4 (EDT)
- Area codes: 770, 678 & 470
- GNIS ID: 30178

Stilesboro is an unincorporated community in southern Bartow County, Georgia, United States.

== History ==
A post office was established at Stilesboro in 1846, and remained in operation until it was discontinued in 1953. The community was named after William H. Stiles, an early settler.

The Georgia General Assembly incorporated Stilesboro as a town in 1866. The town's municipal charter was repealed in 1995.
