= Cartersville City School District =

School district in Georgia (U.S. state)

Address
- 15 Nelson Street Cartersville, Georgia, 30120-2855; United States
- Coordinates: 34.172396°N 84.793063°W

District information
- Grades: Pre-kindergarten – 12
- Superintendent: Marc Feuerbach
- Accreditations: Southern Association of Colleges and Schools; Georgia Accrediting Commission

Students and staff
- Enrollment: 4,497 (2022–23)
- Faculty: 931.30 (FTE)
- Staff: 956.20 (FTE)
- Student–teacher ratio: 14.82

Other information
- Website: cartersvilleschools.org

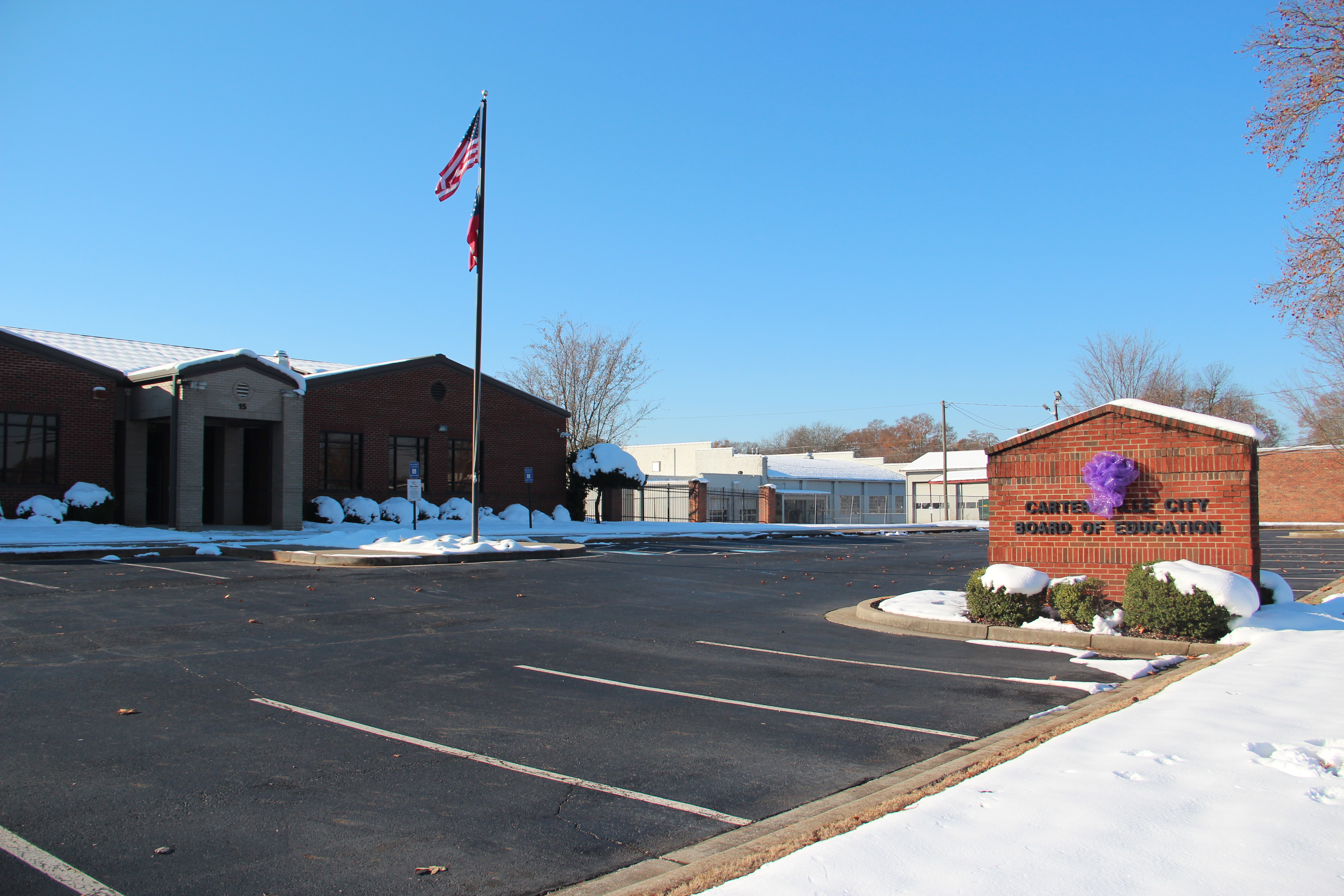
Cartersville City School District headquarters in 2017

The Cartersville City School District is a public school district in Bartow County, Georgia, United States, based in Cartersville. It serves the city of Cartersville in Bartow County.

The school board maintains schools for pre-school to grade twelve. There is one primary school, one elementary school, a middle school, and a high school.

== Schools ==
The Cartersville City School District has two elementary schools, one middle school, and one high school.

=== Elementary schools ===
- Cartersville Elementary School
- Cartersville Primary School

=== Middle school ===
- Cartersville Middle School

=== High school ===
- Cartersville High School
