= Charlie Sproull =

American baseball player (1919-1980)

- Pitcher
- Born: January 9, 1919; Taylorsville, Georgia, U.S.
- Died: January 13, 1980 (aged 61); Rockford, Illinois, U.S.
- Batted: Right Threw: Right

MLB debut
- April 19, 1945, for the Philadelphia Phillies

Last MLB appearance
- September 21, 1945, for the Philadelphia Phillies

MLB statistics
- Win–loss record: 4–10
- Earned run average: 5.94
- Strikeouts: 47
- Stats at Baseball Reference

Teams
- Philadelphia Phillies (1945)

Charles William Sproull (January 9, 1919 – January 13, 1980) was an American Major League Baseball pitcher who played in 1945 with the Philadelphia Phillies. He batted and threw right-handed.

Sproull was born in Taylorsville, Georgia, and died in Rockford, Illinois.
