= National Register of Historic Places listings in Bartow County, Georgia =

This is a list of properties and districts in Bartow County, Georgia that are listed on the National Register of Historic Places (NRHP).

This National Park Service list is complete through NPS recent listings posted October 2, 2026.

== Current listings ==
	Name on the Register	Image	Date listed	Location	City or town	Description
1	Adairsville Historic District	Adairsville Historic District	December 4, 1987 (#87002043)	Roughly Main St. bounded by King & Elm Sts., & city limits on S & W 34°22′03″N 84°56′03″W	Adairsville	
2	ATCO-Goodyear Mill and Mill Village Historic District	ATCO-Goodyear Mill and Mill Village Historic District	October 21, 2005 (#05001172)	Roughly bounded by Sugar Valley Rd., Cassville Rd. and Pettit Creek, Wingfoot Trail and Litchfield St. 34°10′44″N 84°49′09″W	Cartersville	
3	Bartow County Courthouse	Bartow County Courthouse	September 18, 1980 (#80000971)	Courthouse Sq. 34°09′57″N 84°47′52″W	Cartersville	
4	Benham Place	Benham Place	January 30, 1998 (#98000030)	222 Grassdale Rd. 34°12′16″N 84°49′12″W	Cartersville	
5	Cartersville Downtown Historic District	Cartersville Downtown Historic District	November 12, 2014 (#14000904)	Roughly bounded by Church, Gilmer, Leake & Noble Sts. 34°09′55″N 84°47′49″W	Cartersville	Merger of North Erwin Street Historic District & North Wall Street Historic District, plus additional properties.
6	Cassville Post Office	Cassville Post Office	August 31, 1992 (#92001129)	1813 Cassville Rd. (Old Dixie Hwy.); 34°14′58″N 84°51′10″W	Cassville	
7	Etowah Mounds	Etowah Mounds	October 15, 1966 (#66000272)	N bank of Etowah River; 34°07′33″N 84°48′29″W	Cartersville	A National Historic Landmark and a Georgia state historic site
8	Etowah Valley District		June 30, 1975 (#75000573)	Address Restricted	Cartersville	
9	Rebecca Latimer Felton House	Rebecca Latimer Felton House	January 31, 1979 (#79000697)	N of Cartersville off U.S. 411; 34°12′23″N 84°47′54″W	Cartersville	No longer there according to satellite view
10	First Presbyterian Church	First Presbyterian Church	August 29, 1991 (#91001157)	183 W. Main St. 34°09′51″N 84°47′59″W	Cartersville	
11	Grand Theater	Grand Theater	June 28, 1984 (#84000893)	2 Wall St. 34°09′59″N 84°47′44″W	Cartersville	
12	Corra White Harris House, Study, and Chapel	Corra White Harris House, Study, and Chapel	July 25, 1997 (#97000249)	659 Mt. Pleasant Rd., NE. 34°22′15″N 84°45′39″W	Rydal	
13	Sam Jones Memorial United Methodist Church	Sam Jones Memorial United Methodist Church	September 5, 1985 (#85001972)	100 W. Church St. 34°09′59″N 84°47′52″W	Cartersville	
14	Noble Hill School	Noble Hill School	July 2, 1987 (#87001103)	2361 Frank Harris Pkwy. 34°14′49″N 84°51′31″W	Cassville	Now used as a museum
15	Old Bartow County Courthouse	Old Bartow County Courthouse	September 18, 1980 (#80000972)	4 E. Church St. 34°10′02″N 84°47′45″W	Cartersville	Now the Bartow History Museum
16	Pine Log Methodist Church, Campground, and Cemetery	Pine Log Methodist Church, Campground, and Cemetery	September 9, 1988 (#86002176)	GA 140, W of US 411; 34°20′57″N 84°43′33″W	Rydal	(See partial description at Rydal, Georgia)
17	Roselawn	Roselawn	January 12, 1973 (#73000607)	244 Cherokee Ave. 34°09′54″N 84°48′10″W	Cartersville	Now a museum
18	Smith and Douglas Family Houses	Smith and Douglas Family Houses	April 22, 1999 (#99000412)	Mac Johnson Rd. 34°14′03″N 84°50′44″W	Cassville	
19	Valley View		May 8, 1974 (#74000657)	Euharlee Rd., SW of Cartersville; 34°08′23″N 84°52′04″W	Cartersville	

== Former listings ==
	Name on the Register	Image	Date listed	Date removed	Location	City or town	Description
1	North Erwin Street Historic District	North Erwin Street Historic District	September 16, 1994 (#94001071)	November 12, 2014	Jct. of N. Erwin and Cherokee Sts. 34°09′57″N 84°47′50″W	Cartersville	Merged into Cartersville Downtown Historic District.
2	North Wall Street Historic District	North Wall Street Historic District	March 19, 1998 (#98000249)	November 12, 2014	Roughly bounded by N. Wall, E. Church, and N. Gilmer Sts., and E. Cherokee Ave. 34°10′00″N 84°47′42″W	Cartersville	Merged into Cartersville Downtown Historic District.
