= White, Georgia =

- City
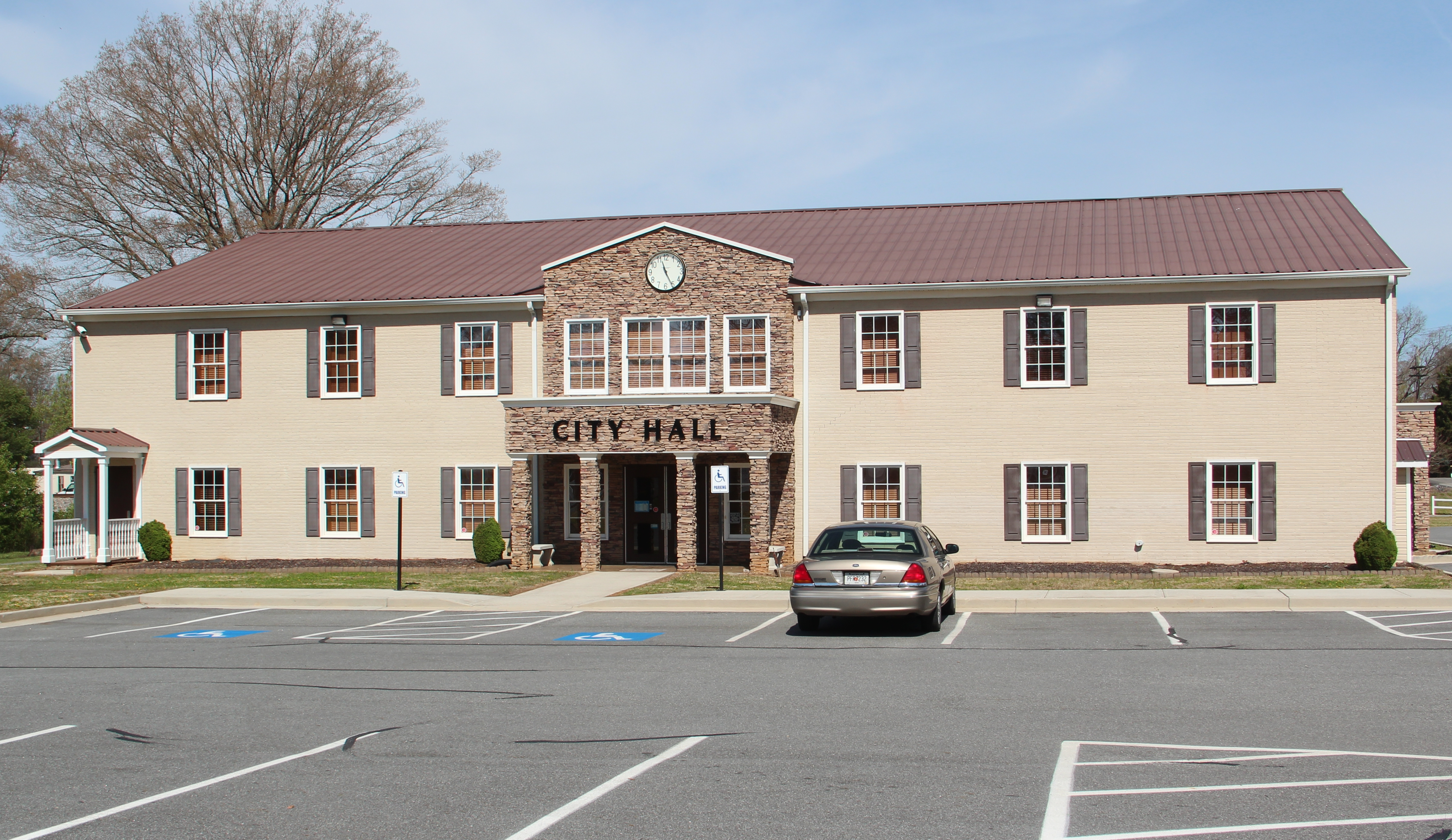
- White City Hall

- Seal
- Motto: “The Friendliest Mile in Georgia”
- Location in Bartow County and the state of Georgia
- Coordinates: 34°16′50″N 84°44′48″W
- Country: United States
- State: Georgia
- County: Bartow

Area
  - Total: 1.05 sq mi (2.71 km^{2})
  - Land: 1.05 sq mi (2.71 km^{2})
  - Water: 0 sq mi (0.00 km^{2})
- Elevation: 860 ft (262 m)

Population (2020)
  - Total: 661
  - Density: 631.6/sq mi (243.87/km^{2})
- Time zone: UTC-5 (Eastern (EST))
  - Summer (DST): UTC-4 (EDT)
- ZIP code: 30184
- Area codes: 770/678/470/943
- FIPS code: 13-82468
- GNIS feature ID: 0356633
- Website: www.cityofwhitega.com

White is a city in Bartow County, Georgia, United States. The population was 661 at the 2020 census.

White is located along U.S. Highway 411, 3 miles (5 km) north of Interstate 75. It is a bedroom community of Cartersville, which is located 9 miles (14 km) to the south, but they are connected by a chain of homes and retail shops.

== History ==
A post office called White has been in operation since 1890. James Alexander White, the first postmaster, gave the city its name.

The Georgia General Assembly incorporated White as a town in 1919.

In March 2016, the city's police chief, as well as its only full-time officer, were arrested on false imprisonment charges. The arrests left the city with no police department.

The city has a new mayor as of June 6, 2022, Perry Bell, who later died on September 25, 2022.

== Geography ==
White is located at 34°16′50″N 84°44′48″W (34.280449, -84.746606).

According to the United States Census Bureau, the city has a total area of 0.97 square miles (2.5 km^{2}), all land.

== Demographics ==
Historical population
| Census | Pop. | Note | %± |
|---|---|---|---|
| 1920 | 319 | | — |
| 1930 | 544 | | 70.5% |
| 1940 | 474 | | −12.9% |
| 1950 | 454 | | −4.2% |
| 1960 | 439 | | −3.3% |
| 1970 | 462 | | 5.2% |
| 1980 | 501 | | 8.4% |
| 1990 | 542 | | 8.2% |
| 2000 | 693 | | 27.9% |
| 2010 | 670 | | −3.3% |
| 2020 | 661 | | −1.3% |
U.S. Decennial Census

As of the census of 2000, there were 693 people, 258 households, and 197 families residing in the city. The population density was 764.8 inhabitants per square mile (295.3/km^{2}). There were 274 housing units at an average density of 302.4 units per square mile (116.8 units/km^{2}). The racial makeup of the city was 94.81% White, 2.89% African American, 0.29% Native American, 0.14% Asian, 0.87% from other races, and 1.01% from two or more races. Hispanic or Latino of any race were 2.60% of the population.

There were 258 households, out of which 41.1% had children under the age of 18 living with them, 56.6% were married couples living together, 14.3% had a female householder with no husband present, and 23.6% were non-families. 20.9% of all households were made up of individuals, and 9.3% had someone living alone who was 65 years of age or older. The average household size was 2.69 and the average family size was 3.04.

In the city, the population was spread out, with 31.0% under the age of 18, 8.9% from 18 to 24, 28.7% from 25 to 44, 19.2% from 45 to 64, and 12.1% who were 65 years of age or older. The median age was 32 years. For every 100 females, there were 98.0 males. For every 100 females age 18 and over, there were 88.2 males.

The median income for a household in the city was $31,458, and the median income for a family was $36,250. Males had a median income of $30,500 versus $22,404 for females. The per capita income for the city was $14,665. About 13.8% of families and 15.5% of the population were below the poverty line, including 11.3% of those under age 18 and 17.4% of those age 65 or over.
