= Bartow County, Georgia =

County in Georgia, United States

- County
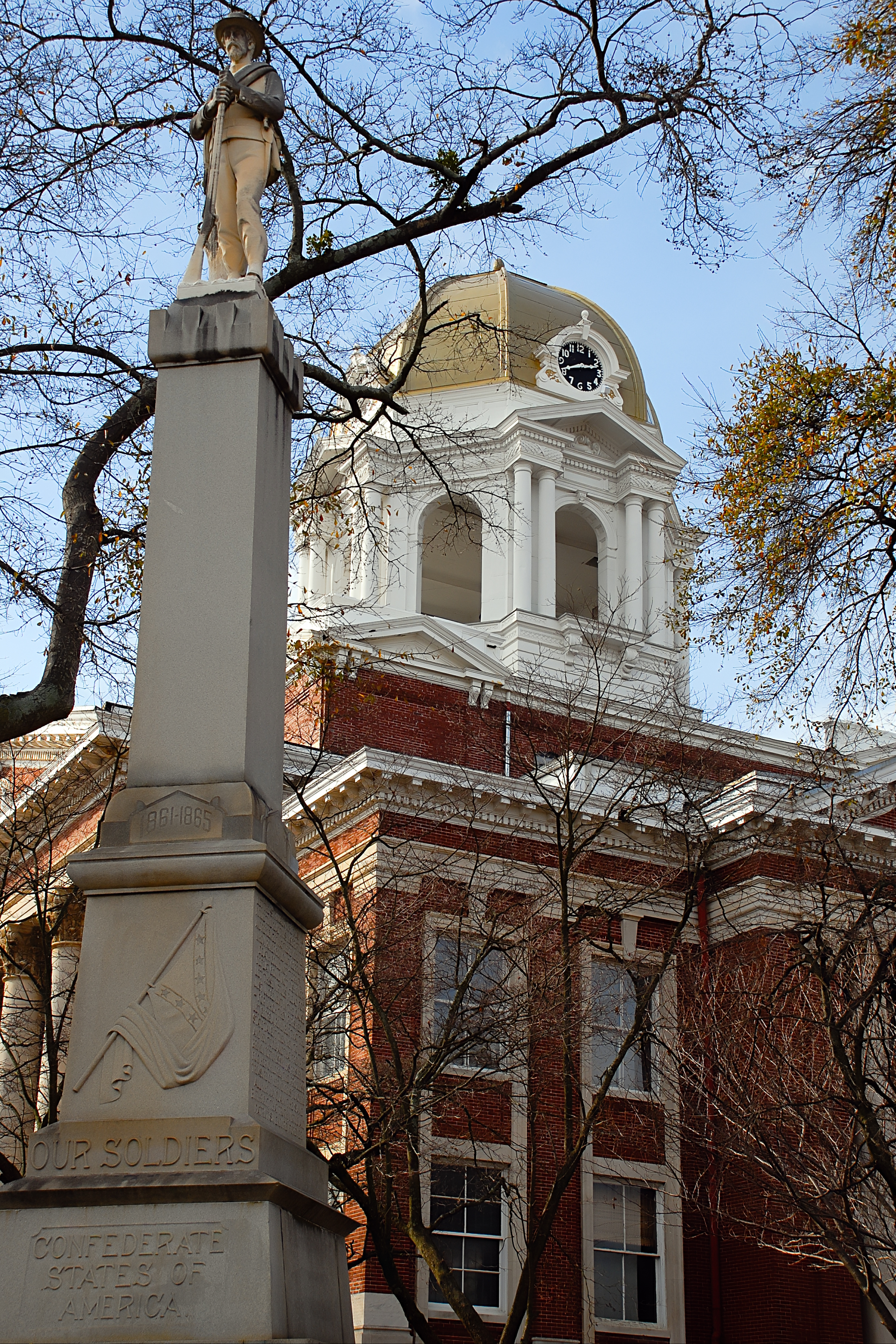
- Bartow County Courthouse and Confederate Monument

- Flag Seal

- Location within the U.S. state of Georgia
- Coordinates: 34°14′N 84°50′W
- Country: United States
- State: Georgia
- Founded: December 3, 1832; 193 years ago
- Named for: Francis S. Bartow
- Seat: Cartersville
- Largest city: Cartersville

Area
  - Total: 470 sq mi (1,200 km^{2})
  - Land: 460 sq mi (1,200 km^{2})
  - Water: 11 sq mi (28 km^{2}) 2.2%

Population (2020)
  - Total: 108,901
  - Estimate (2025): 120,800 ▲
  - Density: 240/sq mi (91/km^{2})
- Time zone: UTC−5 (Eastern)
  - Summer (DST): UTC−4 (EDT)
- Congressional district: 11th
- Website: bartowcountyga.gov

Bartow County is in the northwest region of the U.S. state of Georgia. As of the 2020 census, its population was 108,901, up from 100,157 in 2010. The county seat is Cartersville. Traditionally considered part of Northwest Georgia, Bartow County is now included in the Atlanta metropolitan area, mainly in the southeastern part near Cartersville, which has become an exurb more than 40 mi (64 km) from downtown Atlanta on I-75. It has a sole commissioner government and is the largest county by population of the few remaining in Georgia with a sole commissioner.

== History ==
Bartow County was created from the Cherokee lands of the Cherokee County territory on December 3, 1832, and named Cass County, after General Lewis Cass (1782–1866), Secretary of War under President Andrew Jackson, Minister to France and Secretary of State under President James Buchanan, who was instrumental in the removal of Native Americans from the area. However, the county was renamed on December 6, 1861, in honor of Francis S. Bartow, because of Cass's support of the Union, though Bartow never visited in the county, living 300 miles (480 km) away near Savannah all of his life. Cass had supported the doctrine of popular sovereignty, the right of each state to determine its own laws independently of the federal government, the platform of conservative Southerners who removed his name.

The Civil War first entered Bartow County on April 12, 1862, in the form of the Great Locomotive Chase. As a result of the Western & Atlantic Railroad’s (W&A RR) strategic war time value, Union soldiers boarded and stole a train named the General. Their plan was to take the stolen train north toward Chattanooga, Tennessee, destroying bridges, parts of the railroad, and telegraph lines along the way.

The raiders were unable to cause sufficient destruction to the railroad to make pursuit impossible, and William Fuller, the conductor of the stolen train, eventually caught up with them just north of Ringgold, Georgia.

The first county seat was at Cassville. After the burning of the county courthouse and the Sherman occupation, the seat moved to Cartersville, where it remains.

Bartow County was profoundly affected by the Civil War; an estimated one of three Bartow County soldiers died during the war as a result of wounds received, diseases caught, and in one case, as a result of a train accident. At the end of the Civil War, many residents were financially insolvent, the county seat was "in ruins", the transportation networks were severely damaged, and the citizens were starving due to several consecutive years of crop failures.

Prior to the Civil War, Bartow County's social order, and that of the South as a whole, was dominated by "a sense of white intraclass unity that rested upon a shared notion of racial supremacy." After the war, during Reconstruction, that world view was challenged, creating a period of racial tension. When the state of Georgia allocated $200,000 to purchase and transport corn into North Georgia, local officials solely distributed the corn to white families. When black families petitioned Bartow County for better educational and vocational opportunities, some local whites responded with violence, including Ku Klux Klan activity.

== Geography ==
According to the U.S. Census Bureau, the county has a total area of 470 square miles (1,217 km^{2}), of which 11 square miles (28 km^{2}) or 2.2% are covered by water.

The bulk of Bartow County is located in the Etowah River sub-basin of the ACT River Basin (Alabama-Coosa-Tallapoosa River Basin). The northeastern portion of the county around Rydal is located in the Coosawattee River sub-basin of the same ACT River Basin, while an even smaller northwestern section around Adairsville is located in the Oostanaula River sub-basin of the larger ACT River Basin.

The Etowah is mostly part of Lake Allatoona in southeast Bartow and southwest Cherokee counties, with the Allatoona Dam near Cartersville also impounding Allatoona Creek into northwest Cobb county. The peninsula between the two major arms of the lake is home to Red Top Mountain State Park, east-southeast of Cartersville and just southeast of the dam.

=== Adjacent counties ===
- Gordon County – north
- Pickens County – northeast
- Cherokee County – east
- Cobb County – southeast
- Paulding County – south
- Polk County – southwest
- Floyd County – west

== Demographics ==
Historical population
Census	Pop.	Note	%±
1840	9,390		—
1850	13,300		41.6%
1860	15,724		18.2%
1870	16,566		5.4%
1880	18,690		12.8%
1890	20,616		10.3%
1900	20,823		1.0%
1910	25,388		21.9%
1920	24,527		−3.4%
1930	25,364		3.4%
1940	25,283		−0.3%
1950	27,370		8.3%
1960	28,267		3.3%
1970	32,663		15.6%
1980	40,760		24.8%
1990	55,911		37.2%
2000	76,019		36.0%
2010	100,157		31.8%
2020	108,901		8.7%
2025 (est.)	120,800	▲	10.9%
U.S. Decennial Census; 1790-1880 1890-1910; 1920-1930 1930-1940; 1940-1950 1960-1980; 1980-2000 2010 2020

=== Racial and ethnic composition ===
Bartow County, Georgia – Racial and ethnic composition Note: the US Census treats Hispanic/Latino as an ethnic category. This table excludes Latinos from the racial categories and assigns them to a separate category. Hispanics/Latinos may be of any race.
Race / Ethnicity (NH = Non-Hispanic)	Pop 1980	Pop 1990	Pop 2000	Pop 2010	Pop 2020	% 1980	% 1990	% 2000	% 2010	% 2020
White alone (NH)	35,735	50,116	65,644	79,803	80,159	87.67%	89.64%	86.35%	79.68%	73.61%
Black or African American alone (NH)	4,686	5,013	6,558	10,024	11,309	11.50%	8.97%	8.63%	10.01%	10.38%
Native American or Alaska Native alone (NH)	61	115	192	288	254	0.15%	0.21%	0.25%	0.29%	0.23%
Asian alone (NH)	40	137	381	705	1,169	0.10%	0.25%	0.50%	0.70%	1.07%
Native Hawaiian or Pacific Islander alone (NH)	x	x	20	54	40	x	x	0.03%	0.05%	0.04%
Other race alone (NH)	11	9	59	102	466	0.03%	0.02%	0.08%	0.10%	0.43%
Mixed race or Multiracial (NH)	x	x	641	1,491	4,753	x	x	0.84%	1.49%	4.36%
Hispanic or Latino (any race)	227	521	2,524	7,690	10,751	0.56%	0.93%	3.32%	7.68%	9.87%
Total	40,760	55,911	76,019	100,157	108,901	100.00%	100.00%	100.00%	100.00%	100.00%

=== 2020 census ===
As of the 2020 census, 108,901 people, 40,045 households, and 28,529 families resided in the county.

Of the residents, 23.3% were under 18 and 15.0% were 65 or older; the median age was 38.9 years. For every 100 females, there were 97.3 males, and for every 100 females 18 and over, there were 95.1 males. About 60.6% of residents lived in urban areas, while 39.4% lived in rural areas.

The racial makeup of the county was 75.7% White, 10.6% Black or African American, 0.4% American Indian and Alaska Native, 1.1% Asian, 4.9% from some other race, and 7.3% from two or more races. Hispanic or Latino residents of any race comprised 9.9% of the population.

Of the 40,045 households in the county, 33.7% had children under 18 living with them, 24.6% had a female householder with no spouse or partner present, 22.6% were made up of individuals, and 9.2% had someone living alone who was 65 or older.

The county had 42,435 housing units, of which 5.6% were vacant. Among occupied housing units, 68.4% were owner-occupied and 31.6% were renter-occupied. The homeowner vacancy rate was 1.6% and the rental vacancy rate was 4.7%.

=== 2010 census ===
As of the 2010 United States census, 100,157 people, 35,782 households, and 26,529 families were living in the county. The population density was 217.9 inhabitants per square mile (84.1/km^{2}). The 39,823 housing units had an average density of 86.7 per square mile (33.5/km^{2}). The racial makeup of the county was 82.7% White, 10.2% Black or African American, 0.7% Asian, 0.4% American Indian, 0.1% Pacific islander, 3.8% from other races, and 2.1% from two or more races. Those of Hispanic or Latino origin made up 7.7% of the population. In terms of ancestry, 13.9% were American, 10.0% were Irish, 9.3% were English, and 7.8% were German.

Of the 35,782 households, 39.8% had children under 18 living with them, 54.8% were married couples living together, 13.5% had a female householder with no husband present, 25.9% were not families, and 21.0% were made up of individuals. The average household size was 2.77, and the average family size was 3.20. The median age was 36.2 years.

The median income in the county for a household was $49,216 and for a family was $56,281. Males had a median income of $42,835 versus $31,225 for females. The per capita income for the county was $22,241. About 10.8% of families and 14.0% of the population were below the poverty line, including 18.9% of those under 18 and 12.1% of those 65 or over.

=== 2000 census ===
As of 2000, 76,019 people, 27,176 households, and 21,034 families lived in the county. The population density was 64/km^{2} (170/mi^{2}). The 28,751 housing units had an average density of 24 persons per square kilometre (62 persons/mi^{2}). The racial makeup of the county was 87.79% White, 8.68% African American, 0.28% Native American, 0.51% Asian, 0.03% Pacific Islander, 1.62% from other races, and 1.10% from two or more races. About 3.32% of the population were Hispanic or Latino of any race.

Of the 27,176 households, 38.2% had children under 18 living with them, 61.9% were married couples living together, 11.1% were single woman households, and 22.6% were not families. Around 18.7% of all households were made up of individuals, and 6.7% had someone living alone who was 65 or older. The average household size was 2.76, and the average family size was 3.14.

In the county, the page distribution was 27.9% under 18, 8.3% from 18 to 24, 33.0% from 25 to 44, 21.4% from 45 to 64, and 9.4% who were 65 or older. The median age was 34 years. For every 100 females, there were 97.70 males. For every 100 females 18 and over, there were 94.90 males.

The median income in the county for a household was $43,660 and for a family was $49,198. Males had a median income of $35,136 versus $24,906 for females. The per capita income for the county was $18,989; 8.6% of the population and 6.6% of families were below the poverty line, of which 9.6% were under 18 and 12.2% were 65 or older.

== Education ==
Public education in Bartow County is administered by Bartow County School District and Cartersville City Schools.

Excel Christian Academy and the Trinity School are private institutions.

== Politics ==
Bartow County has voted Republican consistently in presidential elections since 1984. Mitt Romney carried the county in 2012 with 75% of the vote.

For elections to the United States House of Representatives, Bartow County is part of Georgia's 11th congressional district, currently represented by Republican congressman Barry Loudermilk. For elections to the Georgia State Senate, Bartow County is divided between districts 37 and 52. For elections to the Georgia House of Representatives, Bartow County is divided between districts 14 and 15.

United States presidential election results for Bartow County, Georgia
Year	Republican		Democratic		Third party(ies)	
Year	No.	%	No.	%	No.	%
1880	827	30.14%	1,917	69.86%	0	0.00%
1884	584	36.07%	1,035	63.93%	0	0.00%
1888	290	22.48%	916	71.01%	84	6.51%
1892	445	20.79%	1,327	62.01%	368	17.20%
1896	808	42.84%	1,026	54.40%	52	2.76%
1900	823	46.37%	891	50.20%	61	3.44%
1904	406	30.41%	791	59.25%	138	10.34%
1908	780	48.99%	726	45.60%	86	5.40%
1912	89	5.55%	963	60.00%	553	34.45%
1916	92	5.28%	1,325	76.02%	326	18.70%
1920	754	44.99%	922	55.01%	0	0.00%
1924	482	34.60%	846	60.73%	65	4.67%
1928	838	50.24%	830	49.76%	0	0.00%
1932	121	7.22%	1,546	92.19%	10	0.60%
1936	444	16.57%	2,228	83.13%	8	0.30%
1940	318	15.44%	1,734	84.17%	8	0.39%
1944	506	20.90%	1,915	79.10%	0	0.00%
1948	440	14.34%	2,384	77.71%	244	7.95%
1952	1,183	22.94%	3,973	77.06%	0	0.00%
1956	1,536	29.68%	3,640	70.32%	0	0.00%
1960	1,292	26.71%	3,545	73.29%	0	0.00%
1964	2,813	37.77%	4,635	62.23%	0	0.00%
1968	2,045	24.78%	2,154	26.11%	4,052	49.11%
1972	4,836	75.26%	1,590	24.74%	0	0.00%
1976	1,876	18.68%	8,166	81.32%	0	0.00%
1980	3,135	28.89%	7,490	69.01%	228	2.10%
1984	7,104	59.78%	4,780	40.22%	0	0.00%
1988	8,039	61.63%	4,884	37.44%	121	0.93%
1992	7,742	45.57%	6,675	39.29%	2,573	15.14%
1996	9,250	51.32%	6,853	38.02%	1,922	10.66%
2000	14,720	64.62%	7,508	32.96%	553	2.43%
2004	22,311	73.66%	7,741	25.56%	239	0.79%
2008	25,976	71.81%	9,662	26.71%	537	1.48%
2012	26,876	74.87%	8,396	23.39%	625	1.74%
2016	29,911	75.28%	8,212	20.67%	1,610	4.05%
2020	37,672	74.62%	12,091	23.95%	723	1.43%
2024	43,271	75.19%	13,942	24.23%	334	0.58%

United States Senate election results for Bartow County, Georgia2
Year	Republican		Democratic		Third party(ies)	
Year	No.	%	No.	%	No.	%
2020	37,009	73.90%	11,664	23.29%	1,407	2.81%
2020	32,239	75.02%	10,735	24.98%	0	0.00%

United States Senate election results for Bartow County, Georgia3
Year	Republican		Democratic		Third party(ies)	
Year	No.	%	No.	%	No.	%
2020	21,183	42.69%	7,655	15.43%	20,781	41.88%
2020	32,049	74.57%	10,928	25.43%	0	0.00%
2022	29,361	73.84%	9,349	23.51%	1,053	2.65%
2022	26,750	75.78%	8,550	24.22%	0	0.00%

Georgia Gubernatorial election results for Bartow County
Year	Republican		Democratic		Third party(ies)	
Year	No.	%	No.	%	No.	%
2022	31,528	78.83%	8,137	20.34%	332	0.83%

== Transportation ==
=== Major highways ===
- I-75 / SR 401 (unsigned)
- US 41 / SR 3
- US 411
- SR 20
  - SR 20 Spur (Cartersville)
- SR 61
- SR 113
- SR 140
- SR 293
  - SR 293 Conn. (Cassville)

== Museums ==
- Bartow History Museum opened in 1987 and is located in the historic 1869 Courthouse in downtown Cartersville. Artifacts, photographs, documents and a variety of permanent exhibits focus on the settlement and development of Bartow County, Georgia, beginning with the early nineteenth century when the Cherokee inhabited the area. Early European settler life, the iron ore and bauxite industries, Civil War strife, post-war recovery, the Great Depression era, early textile industries and notable figures are depicted through interactive exhibits in the permanent gallery space. The museum offers a wide variety of educational programs and lectures.
- Booth Western Art Museum, an affiliate of the Smithsonian Institution, is a 120,000-square-foot (11,000 m^{2}) museum located in Cartersville. Guests are invited to See America's Story through contemporary Western artwork, presidential portraits and letters, Civil War art, more than 200 Native American artifacts, and Sagebrush Ranch children's gallery. Open since August 2003, Booth Museum is the second largest art museum in the state, and houses the largest permanent exhibition space for Western art in the country.
- Tellus Science Museum, an affiliate of the Smithsonian Institution, is a world-class 120,000-square-foot (11,000 m^{2}) museum located in Cartersville, just off I-75 at exit 293. The museum features four main galleries: the Weinman Mineral Gallery, the Fossil Gallery, Science in Motion and the Collins Family My Big Backyard. There is also a 120-seat digital planetarium and an observatory with a state-of-the-art 20-inch telescope located at Tellus.
- Euharlee History Museum is located adjacent to the Euharlee Covered Bridge in Euharlee, Georgia, about 9 miles west of downtown Cartersville. The museum opened in 1997 and is a cooperation between the Euharlee Historical Society and the City of Euharlee.
- Adairsville Rail Depot Age of Steam Museum is located in a restored 1847 railroad depot on the Historic Public Square in Adairsville, along with a locally operated welcome center. The museum displays artifacts and pictures covering almost 150 years of life in the area, including the Civil War, the chenille boom, railroad history, early farming implements, and weapons.

== Recreation ==
- Bartow County Georgia Hiking Trails
- Etowah Indian Mounds

== Communities ==
=== Cities ===
- Adairsville
- Cartersville
- Emerson
- Euharlee
- Kingston
- White

=== Town ===
- Taylorsville

=== Unincorporated communities ===
- Atco
- Cassville
- Rowland Springs
- Stilesboro
- Rydal (south of Pine Log)
- Folsom
- Center
- Allatoona (mostly lost to Lake Allatoona, but portion remains at Allatoona Pass)

=== Historical communities ===
Allatoona	Aylmer	ATCO	Aubrey	Bartow
Best's	Birmingham	Bochee	Bolivar	Cass Line
Cass Station	Cassville (Manassas)	Cave	Cement	Center
Clifford	Connaseena	Corbin	Dewey	Etowah
Etowah Valley (see Rowland Springs)	Eves	Ferrobutte (see Rogers Station)	Five Forks	Flexatile (see Funkhouser)
Folsom	Ford	Grassdale	Gum Springs	Halls Station (see Linwood)
Iron Hill	Ironville	Junta	Ladds	Ligon
Linwood (see Hall's Station)	Little Prairie	Malbone	McCallie	McGinnis
Mountain House	Murchisons	Nolans	Pine Log (see Rydal)	Rogers Station (aka Rogersville)
Rowland Springs (see Etowah Valley)	Ruby	Rydal (see Pine Log)	Sanfordsville	Sophia
Stamp Creek	Stilesboro	Sugar Hill	Woolley's	Wyvern

== Notable people ==
In the early 20th century, Lucian Lamar Knight wrote:

There is not a county in Georgia which, in proportion to population, surpasses Bartow in the names of distinguished residents. Men eminent in widely different spheres of activity have lived here, some of whom have achieved reputations international in extent.

— Lucian Lamar Knight, Georgia's Landmarks, Memorials and Legends (1913), p. 296

Examples he gave included evangelist Sam P. Jones, politicians William H. Stiles and Mark A. Cooper, major-general Pierce M. B. Young and brigadier-general William T. Wofford.

== See also ==
- National Register of Historic Places listings in Bartow County, Georgia
- List of counties in Georgia
