= 2017 Sparks Energy 300 =

Ninth race of the 2017 NASCAR Xfinity Series

Race details
- Race 9 of 33 in the 2017 NASCAR Xfinity Series
- Date: May 6, 2017
- Official name: 26th Annual Sparks Energy 300
- Location: Lincoln, Alabama, Talladega Superspeedway
- Course: Permanent racing facility
- Course length: 2.66 miles (4.28 km)
- Distance: 113 laps, 300.58 mi (483.736 km)
- Scheduled distance: 113 laps, 300.58 mi (483.736 km)
- Average speed: 139.068 miles per hour (223.808 km/h)

Pole position
Driver	Blake Koch	Kaulig Racing
- Time: 52.188

Most laps led
Driver	Justin Allgaier	JR Motorsports
- Laps: 24

Winner
No. 98	Aric Almirola	Biagi–DenBeste Racing

Television in the United States
- Network: FOX
- Announcers: Adam Alexander, Michael Waltrip, Kevin Harvick

Radio in the United States
- Radio: Motor Racing Network

The 2017 Sparks Energy 300 was the ninth stock car race of the 2017 NASCAR Xfinity Series season and the 26th iteration of the event. The race was held on Saturday, May 6, 2017, in Lincoln, Alabama at Talladega Superspeedway, a 2.66 miles (4.28 km) permanent triangle-shaped superspeedway. The race took the scheduled 113 laps to complete. At race's end, Aric Almirola, driving for Biagi–DenBeste Racing, would take the lead with four to go and defend fiercely to win his third and to date, his only win of the season. To fill out the podium, Elliott Sadler of JR Motorsports and Joey Logano of Team Penske would finish second and third, respectively.

== Entry list ==
- (R) denotes rookie driver.
- (i) denotes driver who is ineligible for series driver points.

#	Driver	Team	Make
00	Cole Custer (R)	Stewart–Haas Racing	Ford
0	Garrett Smithley	JD Motorsports	Chevrolet
1	Elliott Sadler	JR Motorsports	Chevrolet
01	Harrison Rhodes	JD Motorsports	Chevrolet
2	Ben Kennedy (R)	Richard Childress Racing	Chevrolet
3	Ty Dillon (i)	Richard Childress Racing	Chevrolet
4	Ross Chastain	JD Motorsports	Chevrolet
5	Michael Annett	JR Motorsports	Chevrolet
6	Bubba Wallace	Roush Fenway Racing	Ford
7	Justin Allgaier	JR Motorsports	Chevrolet
07	Ray Black Jr.	SS-Green Light Racing	Chevrolet
8	Jeff Green	B. J. McLeod Motorsports	Toyota
9	William Byron (R)	JR Motorsports	Chevrolet
11	Blake Koch	Kaulig Racing	Chevrolet
13	Mark Thompson	MBM Motorsports	Toyota
14	J. J. Yeley	TriStar Motorsports	Toyota
16	Ryan Reed	Roush Fenway Racing	Ford
18	Daniel Suárez (i)	Joe Gibbs Racing	Toyota
19	Matt Tifft (R)	Joe Gibbs Racing	Toyota
20	Erik Jones (i)	Joe Gibbs Racing	Toyota
21	Daniel Hemric (R)	Richard Childress Racing	Chevrolet
22	Joey Logano (i)	Team Penske	Ford
23	Spencer Gallagher (R)	GMS Racing	Chevrolet
24	Scott Lagasse Jr.	JGL Racing	Toyota
25	Chris Cockrum	Chris Cockrum Racing	Chevrolet
28	Dakoda Armstrong	JGL Racing	Toyota
33	Brandon Jones	Richard Childress Racing	Chevrolet
39	Ryan Sieg	RSS Racing	Chevrolet
40	Timmy Hill	MBM Motorsports	Dodge
42	Tyler Reddick	Chip Ganassi Racing	Chevrolet
48	Brennan Poole	Chip Ganassi Racing	Chevrolet
51	Jeremy Clements	Jeremy Clements Racing	Chevrolet
52	Joey Gase	Jimmy Means Racing	Chevrolet
62	Brendan Gaughan	Richard Childress Racing	Chevrolet
74	Mike Harmon	Mike Harmon Racing	Dodge
78	B. J. McLeod	B. J. McLeod Motorsports	Chevrolet
88	Kasey Kahne (i)	JR Motorsports	Chevrolet
89	Morgan Shepherd	Shepherd Racing Ventures	Chevrolet
90	Martin Roy	King Autosport	Chevrolet
98	Aric Almirola (i)	Biagi–DenBeste Racing	Ford
99	David Starr	B. J. McLeod Motorsports with SS-Green Light Racing	Chevrolet
Official entry list

== Practice ==
=== First practice ===
The first practice session was held on Friday, May 5, at 10:30 AM CST, and would last for 55 minutes. Blake Koch of Kaulig Racing would set the fastest time in the session, with a time of 49.722 and an average speed of 192.591 miles per hour (309.945 km/h).

Pos	#	Driver	Team	Make	Time	Speed
1	11	Blake Koch	Kaulig Racing	Chevrolet	49.722	192.591
2	62	Brendan Gaughan	Richard Childress Racing	Chevrolet	49.732	192.552
3	2	Ben Kennedy (R)	Richard Childress Racing	Chevrolet	49.784	192.351
Full first practice results

=== Final practice ===
The final practice session was held on Friday, May 5, at 12:30 PM CST and lasted for 55 minutes. Brandon Jones of Richard Childress Racing set the fastest time in the session, with a time of 52.381 and an average speed of 182.814 miles per hour (294.211 km/h).

Pos	#	Driver	Team	Make	Time	Speed
1	33	Brandon Jones	Richard Childress Racing	Chevrolet	52.381	182.814
2	11	Blake Koch	Kaulig Racing	Chevrolet	52.508	182.372
3	21	Daniel Hemric (R)	Richard Childress Racing	Chevrolet	52.623	181.974
Full final practice results

== Qualifying ==
Qualifying was held on Saturday, May 6, at 9:30 AM CST. Since Talladega Superspeedway at least 2 miles (3.2 km) in length, the qualifying system was a single car, single lap, two round system where in the first round, everyone would set a time to determine positions 13–40. Then, the fastest 12 qualifiers would move on to the second round to determine positions 1–12.

Blake Koch of Kaulig Racing would win the pole, setting a time of 52.188 and an average speed of 183.490 miles per hour (295.299 km/h) in the second round.

B. J. McLeod was the only driver to fail to qualify.

=== Full qualifying results ===
Pos	#	Driver	Team	Make	Time (R1)	Speed (R1)	Time (R2)	Speed (R2)
1	11	Blake Koch	Kaulig Racing	Chevrolet	52.465	182.522	52.188	183.490
2	88	Kasey Kahne (i)	JR Motorsports	Chevrolet	52.498	182.407	52.296	183.112
3	21	Daniel Hemric (R)	Richard Childress Racing	Chevrolet	52.636	181.929	52.491	182.431
4	2	Ben Kennedy (R)	Richard Childress Racing	Chevrolet	52.748	181.542	52.493	182.424
5	33	Brandon Jones	Richard Childress Racing	Chevrolet	52.582	182.116	52.529	182.299
6	7	Justin Allgaier	JR Motorsports	Chevrolet	52.748	181.542	52.640	181.915
7	3	Ty Dillon (i)	Richard Childress Racing	Chevrolet	52.761	181.498	52.646	181.894
8	22	Joey Logano (i)	Team Penske	Ford	52.521	182.327	52.650	181.880
9	9	William Byron (R)	JR Motorsports	Chevrolet	52.777	181.443	52.676	181.791
10	20	Erik Jones (i)	Joe Gibbs Racing	Toyota	52.747	181.546	52.678	181.784
11	16	Ryan Reed	Roush Fenway Racing	Ford	52.701	181.704	52.884	181.076
12	48	Brennan Poole	Chip Ganassi Racing	Chevrolet	52.607	182.029	53.338	179.534
Eliminated in Round 1
13	00	Cole Custer (R)	Stewart–Haas Racing	Ford	52.781	181.429	-	-
14	1	Elliott Sadler	JR Motorsports	Chevrolet	52.800	181.364	-	-
15	28	Dakoda Armstrong	JGL Racing	Toyota	52.813	181.319	-	-
16	42	Tyler Reddick	Chip Ganassi Racing	Chevrolet	52.839	181.230	-	-
17	62	Brendan Gaughan	Richard Childress Racing	Chevrolet	52.884	181.076	-	-
18	18	Daniel Suárez (i)	Joe Gibbs Racing	Toyota	52.925	180.935	-	-
19	19	Matt Tifft (R)	Joe Gibbs Racing	Toyota	52.928	180.925	-	-
20	23	Spencer Gallagher (R)	GMS Racing	Chevrolet	52.945	180.867	-	-
21	5	Michael Annett	JR Motorsports	Chevrolet	52.953	180.840	-	-
22	6	Bubba Wallace	Roush Fenway Racing	Ford	53.102	180.332	-	-
23	98	Aric Almirola (i)	Biagi–DenBeste Racing	Ford	53.170	180.102	-	-
24	24	Scott Lagasse Jr.	JGL Racing	Toyota	53.421	179.255	-	-
25	4	Ross Chastain	JD Motorsports	Chevrolet	53.490	179.024	-	-
26	13	Mark Thompson	MBM Motorsports	Toyota	53.527	178.900	-	-
27	25	Chris Cockrum	Chris Cockrum Racing	Chevrolet	53.557	178.800	-	-
28	74	Mike Harmon	Mike Harmon Racing	Dodge	53.642	178.517	-	-
29	0	Garrett Smithley	JD Motorsports	Chevrolet	53.663	178.447	-	-
30	39	Ryan Sieg	RSS Racing	Chevrolet	53.772	178.085	-	-
31	14	J. J. Yeley	TriStar Motorsports	Toyota	53.776	178.072	-	-
32	99	David Starr	BJMM with SS-Green Light Racing	Chevrolet	53.836	177.874	-	-
33	89	Morgan Shepherd	Shepherd Racing Ventures	Chevrolet	54.090	177.038	-	-
Qualified by owner's points
34	07	Ray Black Jr.	SS-Green Light Racing	Chevrolet	54.139	176.878	-	-
35	52	Joey Gase	Jimmy Means Racing	Chevrolet	54.164	176.796	-	-
36	90	Martin Roy	King Autosport	Chevrolet	54.318	176.295	-	-
37	40	Timmy Hill	MBM Motorsports	Dodge	54.359	176.162	-	-
38	01	Harrison Rhodes	JD Motorsports	Chevrolet	54.378	176.101	-	-
39	51	Jeremy Clements	Jeremy Clements Racing	Chevrolet	54.394	176.049	-	-
Champion's Provisional
40	8	Jeff Green	B. J. McLeod Motorsports	Toyota	54.523	175.632	-	-
Failed to qualify
41	78	B. J. McLeod	B. J. McLeod Motorsports	Toyota	-	-	-	-
Official qualifying results
Official starting lineup

== Race results ==
Stage 1 Laps: 25

Pos	#	Driver	Team	Make	Pts
1	98	Aric Almirola (i)	Biagi–DenBeste Racing	Ford	0
2	22	Joey Logano (i)	Team Penske	Ford	0
3	7	Justin Allgaier	JR Motorsports	Chevrolet	8
4	20	Erik Jones (i)	Joe Gibbs Racing	Toyota	0
5	11	Blake Koch	Kaulig Racing	Chevrolet	6
6	5	Michael Annett	JR Motorsports	Chevrolet	5
7	62	Brendan Gaughan	Richard Childress Racing	Chevrolet	4
8	88	Kasey Kahne (i)	JR Motorsports	Chevrolet	0
9	14	J. J. Yeley	TriStar Motorsports	Toyota	2
10	39	Ryan Sieg	RSS Racing	Chevrolet	1

Stage 2 Laps: 25

Pos	#	Driver	Team	Make	Pts
1	7	Justin Allgaier	JR Motorsports	Chevrolet	10
2	3	Ty Dillon (i)	Richard Childress Racing	Chevrolet	0
3	88	Kasey Kahne (i)	JR Motorsports	Chevrolet	0
4	98	Aric Almirola (i)	Biagi–DenBeste Racing	Ford	0
5	20	Erik Jones (i)	Joe Gibbs Racing	Toyota	0
6	22	Joey Logano (i)	Team Penske	Ford	0
7	42	Tyler Reddick	Chip Ganassi Racing	Chevrolet	4
8	5	Michael Annett	JR Motorsports	Chevrolet	3
9	19	Matt Tifft (R)	Joe Gibbs Racing	Toyota	2
10	2	Ben Kennedy (R)	Richard Childress Racing	Chevrolet	1

Stage 3 Laps: 63

Pos	#	Driver	Team	Make	Laps	Led	Status	Pts
1	98	Aric Almirola (i)	Biagi–DenBeste Racing	Ford	113	13	running	0
2	1	Elliott Sadler	JR Motorsports	Chevrolet	113	0	running	35
3	22	Joey Logano (i)	Team Penske	Ford	113	16	running	0
4	2	Ben Kennedy (R)	Richard Childress Racing	Chevrolet	113	5	running	34
5	20	Erik Jones (i)	Joe Gibbs Racing	Toyota	113	5	running	0
6	19	Matt Tifft (R)	Joe Gibbs Racing	Toyota	113	0	running	33
7	5	Michael Annett	JR Motorsports	Chevrolet	113	6	running	38
8	7	Justin Allgaier	JR Motorsports	Chevrolet	113	24	running	47
9	18	Daniel Suárez (i)	Joe Gibbs Racing	Toyota	113	1	running	0
10	8	Jeff Green	B. J. McLeod Motorsports	Toyota	113	18	running	27
11	14	J. J. Yeley	TriStar Motorsports	Toyota	113	0	running	28
12	39	Ryan Sieg	RSS Racing	Chevrolet	113	1	running	26
13	6	Bubba Wallace	Roush Fenway Racing	Ford	112	0	running	24
14	3	Ty Dillon (i)	Richard Childress Racing	Chevrolet	112	4	running	0
15	88	Kasey Kahne (i)	JR Motorsports	Chevrolet	112	18	running	0
16	52	Joey Gase	Jimmy Means Racing	Chevrolet	112	0	running	21
17	40	Timmy Hill	MBM Motorsports	Dodge	112	0	running	20
18	99	David Starr	BJMM with SS-Green Light Racing	Chevrolet	112	0	running	19
19	4	Ross Chastain	JD Motorsports	Chevrolet	112	1	running	18
20	42	Tyler Reddick	Chip Ganassi Racing	Chevrolet	112	0	running	21
21	0	Garrett Smithley	JD Motorsports	Chevrolet	112	1	running	16
22	01	Harrison Rhodes	JD Motorsports	Chevrolet	112	0	running	15
23	28	Dakoda Armstrong	JGL Racing	Toyota	112	0	running	14
24	48	Brennan Poole	Chip Ganassi Racing	Chevrolet	111	0	running	13
25	74	Mike Harmon	Mike Harmon Racing	Dodge	110	0	running	12
26	00	Cole Custer (R)	Stewart–Haas Racing	Ford	95	0	running	11
27	51	Jeremy Clements	Jeremy Clements Racing	Chevrolet	55	0	electrical	10
28	13	Mark Thompson	MBM Motorsports	Toyota	55	0	engine	9
29	16	Ryan Reed	Roush Fenway Racing	Ford	49	0	crash	8
30	62	Brendan Gaughan	Richard Childress Racing	Chevrolet	49	0	crash	11
31	11	Blake Koch	Kaulig Racing	Chevrolet	49	1	crash	12
32	90	Martin Roy	King Autosport	Chevrolet	49	0	crash	5
33	25	Chris Cockrum	Chris Cockrum Racing	Chevrolet	49	0	crash	4
34	24	Scott Lagasse Jr.	JGL Racing	Toyota	48	0	crash	3
35	89	Morgan Shepherd	Shepherd Racing Ventures	Chevrolet	32	0	fuel pump	2
36	9	William Byron (R)	JR Motorsports	Chevrolet	32	0	crash	1
37	33	Brandon Jones	Richard Childress Racing	Chevrolet	20	0	crash	1
38	21	Daniel Hemric (R)	Richard Childress Racing	Chevrolet	20	0	crash	1
39	23	Spencer Gallagher (R)	GMS Racing	Chevrolet	20	0	crash	1
40	07	Ray Black Jr.	SS-Green Light Racing	Chevrolet	7	0	engine	1
Official race results

== Standings after the race ==
Drivers' Championship standings

Pos	Driver	Points
1	Elliott Sadler	330
2	Justin Allgaier	301 (–29)
3	William Byron	252 (–78)
4	Bubba Wallace	235 (–95)
5	Daniel Hemric	229 (–101)
6	Michael Annett	224 (–106)
7	Matt Tifft	216 (–114)
8	Ryan Reed	206 (–124)
9	Blake Koch	202 (–128)
10	Brennan Poole	193 (–137)
11	Dakoda Armstrong	174 (–156)
12	Cole Custer	165 (–165)
Official driver's standings

- Note: Only the first 12 positions are included for the driver standings.

Previous race: 2017 ToyotaCare 250	NASCAR Xfinity Series; 2017 season	Next race: 2017 Hisense 4K TV 300
