= Phoenix Air =

Airline of the United States

IATA	ICAO	Call sign
PH	PHA	GRAY BIRD
- Founded: 1978
- Operating bases: Cartersville Airport
- Fleet size: 31
- Headquarters: Cartersville, Georgia, USA
- Website: www.phoenixair.com

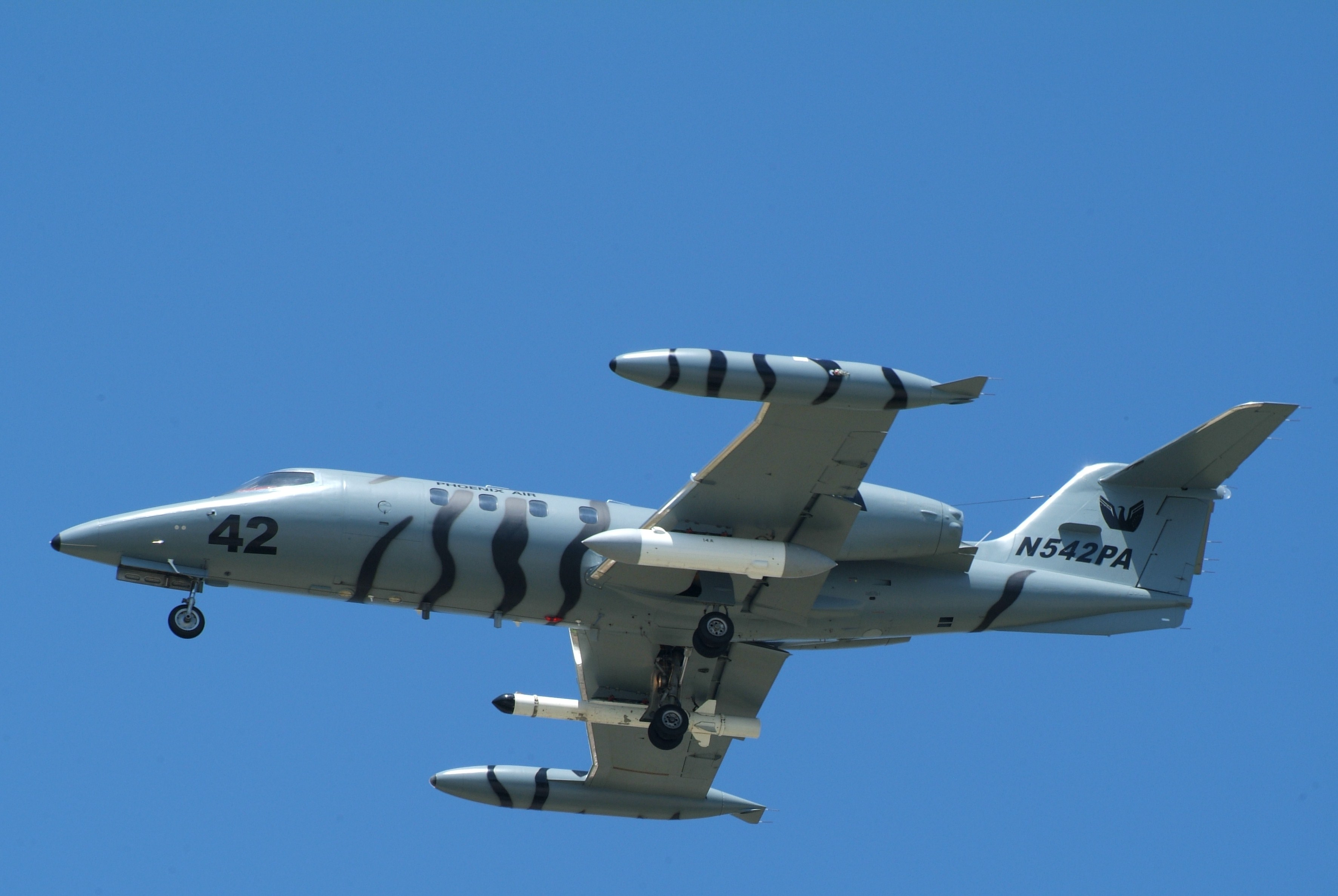
Phoenix Air Learjet 35 (2009)

Phoenix Air Group, often just referred to as Phoenix Air, is a non-scheduled airline headquartered in Cartersville, Georgia, USA, with the city's airport serving as its base. Founded in 1978 by U.S. Army helicopter pilot and race car driver Mark Thompson, Phoenix Air operates worldwide charter flights (passenger and cargo; catering for corporate, military or air ambulance demands).

Phoenix Air employs just over 200 people from Cartersville and the Atlanta metro area.

== Fleet ==
In 2007, Phoenix Air had been named the world's largest owner-operator of Grumman Gulfstream I aircraft. At that time, its fleet consisted of the following:

- 4 Bombardier Learjet 35
- 2 Bombardier Learjet 35A
- 7 Bombardier Learjet 36A
- 8 Grumman Gulfstream I
- 3 Gulfstream III**
- 1 Gulfstream II
- 1 Gulfstream IIB
- 2 Embraer 120 (as of August 2025)
- 2 Saab 340A

Now all of Phoenix Air's fleet of Learjets, Gulfstream G-I and Gulfstream G-III aircraft meet ICAO Chapter 3, Stage 3 Noise Compliance requirements and can operate into and out of all noise sensitive airports throughout the world.

** One Gulfstream III (G-III), N173PA, has been fitted with an Aeromedical Biological Containment System (ABCS), funded by the U.S. Centers for Disease Control and Prevention (CDC). It has been used for transporting of patients with the deadly Ebola outbreak in West Africa in 2014. This is the only aircraft in the world capable of safely transporting patients of highly communicable diseases that offers a high degree of protection to the aircraft's crew and the accompanying medical staff. This aircraft is currently under an "on demand" US$5 million contract to the U.S. State Department. As the virus spread, officials from the World Health Organization, United Nations and Britain, among others, all approached Phoenix Air to sign exclusive deals.

The bio-containment unit is a special negative pressure transport tube that allows medical personnel to treat Ebola patients while in flight. Decontamination includes hydrogen peroxide fog, quaternary ammonia, spore strip testing, and burning of the envelope.

As of 14 October 2014, two Phoenix Air Gulfstreams were able to carry Ebola patients, and another jet was being equipped.

Phoenix Air also operates a larger, containerized version of the ABCS, called the Containerized Bio Containment System. Developed with funding from the U.S State Department and Microsoft co-founder Paul Allen, and support from the research company MRIGlobal, the CBCS is able to carry up to 4 patients and 6 medical staff at once. The CBCS is flown on Kalitta Air Boeing 747-400Fs, allowing for up to 20 patients to be transported, assuming all of Phoenix Airs existing ABCS and CBCS are utilized.

== Accidents and incidents ==
- On 8 January 1988 at 05:19 local time, a Phoenix Air Learjet 36 (registered N79SF) crashed during landing approach of Monroe Municipal Airport following a flight from Memphis, Tennessee, killing the two pilots on board. The NTSB investigation revealed that the co-pilot had not been type rated to fly this aircraft type.
- On 29 June 1989 at 00:04, a Phoenix Air Dassault Falcon 20 (registered N125CA) crashed near Cartersville Airport shortly into a ferry flight to Dannelly Airport. The two pilots died in the accident, which was attributed to crew fatigue and poor training.
- On 14 December 1994, the two pilots of a Phoenix Air Learjet 35 (registered N521PA) experienced an inflight fire. The aircraft was substantially damaged and crashed near Fresno, California. There were no survivors. The crew had been on a military mission with special systems installed in the aircraft. The fire was due to improper electrical wiring.
- On 3 December 2002 at 06:12 local time, a Phoenix Air Learjet 35 (registered N546PA) collided with an elk during take-off at Astoria Regional Airport. In the ensuing rejected take-off, the aircraft overshot the runway and was substantially damaged.
- On 26 March 2007 at 07:30, a Phoenix Air Learjet 36 (registered N527PA) suffered a blown tire during take-off at Newport News/Williamsburg International Airport.(a contributing factor was that the drag chute could not be deployed).
- In 2015, a Phoenix Air Learjet 35 (registered N80PG) skidded on the runway, followed by right main gear collapse which caused substantial damage to the plane during landing at Newport News/Williamsburg International Airport. The cause is still under investigation.
- On 10 May 2023 at 07:50, a Phoenix Air Learjet 36A (registered N56PA) crashed into the sea southwest of San Clemente Island, killing all 3 on board. This accident is currently under investigation.
