= W. J. Gordy =

American potter

- Born: William J. Gordy; May 18, 1910; Aberdeen, Georgia, U.S.
- Died: August 19, 1993 (aged 83)
- Occupation: Potter
- Spouse: Jewell Gordy
- Children: 5

William J. Gordy (May 18, 1910 – August 19, 1993) was an American potter based in Cartersville, Georgia, who has won several awards and honours for his work.

== Biography ==
Gordy was born in Aberdeen, Georgia in 1910. His father was a potter who owned his own business in Alvaton, Georgia. He learned to make pottery by watching the men his father had hired from all over the United States as they made primarily butter churns, jars, pitchers and jugs. He left his father's shop and worked in several pottery businesses in North Carolina and Georgia, seeing and learning new techniques. He served on a destroyer in the Navy during World War II, and enjoyed traveling to different ports and seeing the local pottery. Gordy was married to Jewell Gordy and together, they had three daughters and two sons. He opened his own pottery studio in 1935, in Cartersville, where he made the pottery while his wife handled the business and sales. He was a lifetime member of the Southern Highland Craft Guild, and was also an instructor at John C. Campbell Folk School in Brasstown, North Carolina.

== Style ==
Gordy was one of the first potters in Georgia to transition from the common functional, utilitarian style to an artistic style. He sold to his neighbors, as well as to people throughout the country. Both Cornelius Vanderbilt and Sir John Wedgwood visited him in his studio and purchased several sets of pottery from him. Gordy not only had his own signature style of pottery, but also created his own blend of clay and glazes. He was the first Georgian potter to use colors in his glazes.

== Awards and legacy ==
Gordy's pottery has been on display in the Smithsonian Institution since 1940. He received the Governor's Award in the Arts in 1983 and the Heritage Award from Bartow County. Encyclopædia Britannica lists W. J. Gordy as the "foremost potter in the southeastern United States". This heritage is survived by his grandson, Darrell Adams.
