= VPC =

VPC may refer to:

== Science and technology ==
- Volts Per Cell, the voltage needed to charge a battery
- Vapour Phase Chromatography
- Virtual private cloud, within a public cloud computing network
- Virtual PortChannel - Cisco MC-LAG technology

== Others ==
- Value of Preventing a Casualty
- Ventricular premature contraction, a type of abnormal heartbeat
- Violence Policy Center, US organization advocating firearms control
- The Voter Participation Center
- Cartersville Airport, IATA code
- VP-C, Cayman Islands aircraft registration prefix
