= Pine Mountain (Bartow County, Georgia) =

Mountain in Georgia, United States

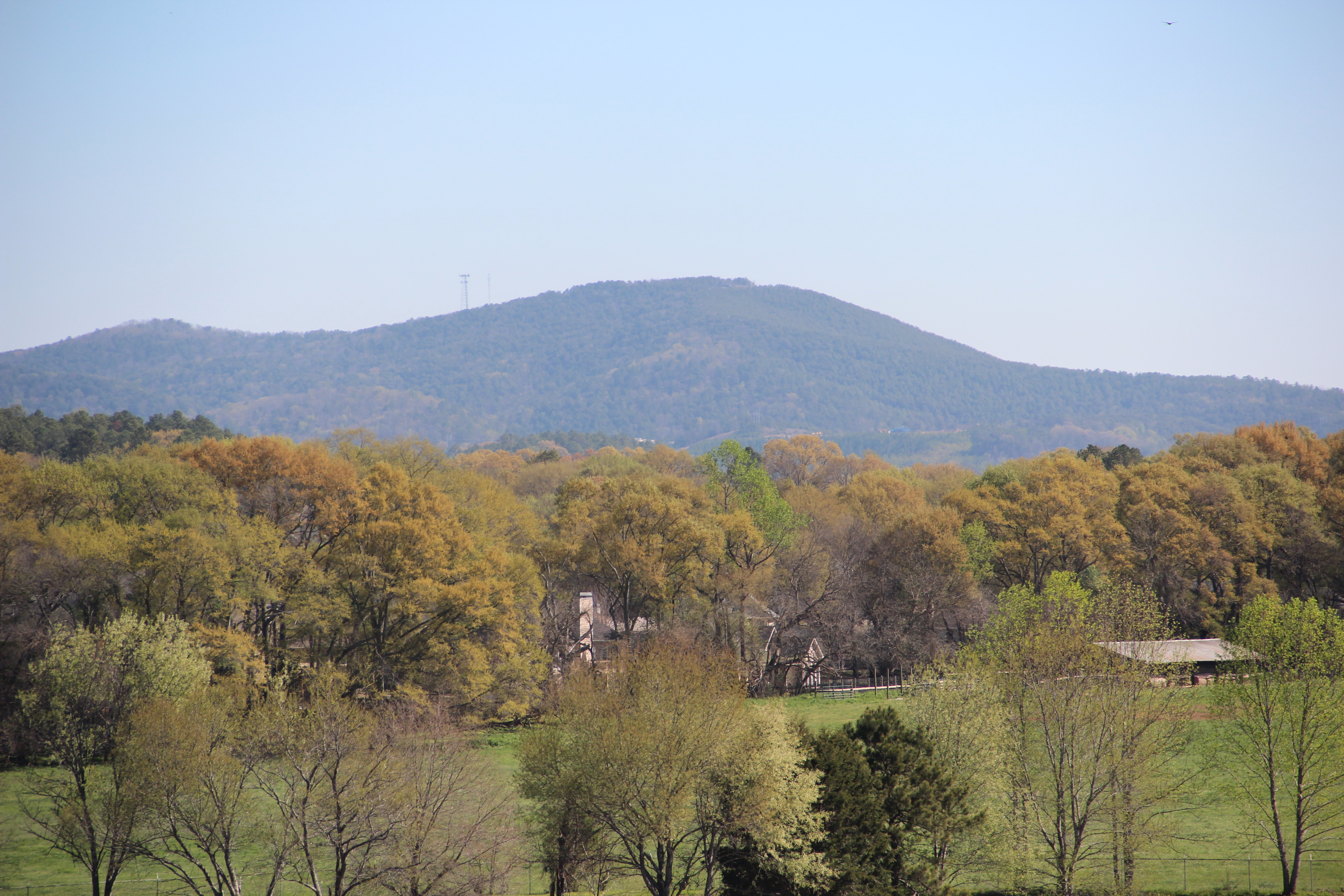
- Pine Mountain, viewed from the Etowah Indian Mounds

Highest point
- Elevation: 1,562 ft (476 m)
- Prominence: 582 ft (177 m)
- Coordinates: 34°10′35″N 84°44′43″W

Geography
- Location: Cartersville, Bartow County, Georgia, U.S.
- Parent range: Appalachian Mountains
- Topo map: USGS Allatoona Dam

Climbing
- Easiest route: Hike

Pine Mountain is a summit in Cartersville, Georgia. At its highest point, the mountain has an elevation of 1,562 feet (476 m). Pine Mountain contains several miles worth of hiking trails.

== Geography ==
Pine Mountain is located in southeastern Bartow County. I-75 runs to the west of the mountain, while Lake Allatoona is located to the east. The summit, located inside Cartersville's city limits, is mostly treeless and contains several rock outcrops. Lake Allatoona, Cartersville, Plant Bowen and Atlanta are visible from the summit. With an elevation of 1,562 feet (476 m), Pine Mountain is the third tallest mountain of Bartow County, if using a 100 feet (30 m) prominence rule. Much of land around the mountain used to be owned by businessman and politician Mark Anthony Cooper.

== Hiking ==
There are two trails that ascend the mountain: the East Loop and the West Loop trails. The East Loop can be accessed from State Route 20 spur, while the West Loop trailhead is located near I-75 Exit 288. The East and West Loops are part of the Pine Mountain Recreational Area trail system and are connected to trails that lead to Cooper's Furnace near Allatoona Dam. The two trails rise over 600 feet over a course of a mile and contain several switchbacks.

== See also ==
- List of mountains in Georgia (U.S. state)
