= 2018 Daytona 500 =

Race details
- Race 1 of 36 in the 2018 Monster Energy NASCAR Cup Series
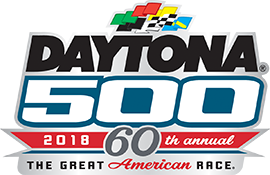
- Date: February 18, 2018
- Location: Daytona International Speedway in Daytona Beach, Florida
- Course: Permanent racing facility 2.5 mi (4 km)
- Distance: 207 laps, 517.5 mi (828 km)
- Scheduled distance: 200 laps, 500 mi (800 km)
- Average speed: 150.545 mph (242.279 km/h)

Pole position
Driver	Alex Bowman	Hendrick Motorsports
- Time: 46.002

Qualifying race winners
Duel 1 Winner	Ryan Blaney	Team Penske
Duel 2 Winner	Chase Elliott	Hendrick Motorsports

Most laps led
Driver	Ryan Blaney	Team Penske
- Laps: 118

Winner
No. 3	Austin Dillon	Richard Childress Racing

Television in the United States
- Network: Fox
- Announcers: Mike Joy, Jeff Gordon and Darrell Waltrip
- Nielsen ratings: 5.3/12 (Overnight)

Radio in the United States
- Radio: MRN
- Booth announcers: Joe Moore, Jeff Striegle and Rusty Wallace
- Turn announcers: Dave Moody (1 & 2), Mike Bagley (Backstretch) and Kyle Rickey (3 & 4)

The 2018 Daytona 500, the 60th running of the event, was a Monster Energy NASCAR Cup Series race held on February 18, 2018, contested over 207 laps—extended from 200 laps due to an overtime finish—on the 2.5-mile (4.0 km) asphalt superspeedway. It was the first race of the 2018 Monster Energy NASCAR Cup Series season, and also marked the first race for the Chevrolet Camaro ZL1 as Chevrolet's car for this season, replacing the SS. Austin Dillon of Richard Childress Racing won the race after contact with Aric Almirola on the final lap resulted in a single-car accident for the latter. Bubba Wallace making his first Daytona 500 start finished second while Denny Hamlin came in third. This was the last Daytona 500 starts for Danica Patrick, Trevor Bayne, Kasey Kahne, David Gilliland, Mark Thompson (in his only Daytona 500 start), BK Racing, Furniture Row Racing and D. J. Kennington.

== Report ==
=== Background ===
Daytona International Speedway, the track where the race was held

Daytona International Speedway is one of six superspeedways to hold NASCAR races, the others being Michigan International Speedway, Auto Club Speedway, Indianapolis Motor Speedway, Pocono Raceway, and Talladega Superspeedway. The standard track at Daytona International Speedway is a four-turn superspeedway that is 2.5 miles (4.0 km) long. The track's turns are banked at 31 degrees, while the front stretch, the location of the finish line, is banked at 18 degrees.

=== Notes ===
This was the first Daytona 500 race since 1982 where none of the cars were sponsored by beer companies (Kevin Harvick and Brad Keselowski, sponsored by Anheuser-Busch InBev and MillerCoors, respectively, were instead sponsored by Jimmy John's and Discount Tire for the race). Only 40 cars entered the race, meaning no entrants would fail to qualify for the race.

=== Entry list ===
No.	Driver	Team	Manufacturer
00	Jeffrey Earnhardt	StarCom Racing	Chevrolet
1	Jamie McMurray (W)	Chip Ganassi Racing	Chevrolet
2	Brad Keselowski	Team Penske	Ford
3	Austin Dillon	Richard Childress Racing	Chevrolet
4	Kevin Harvick (W)	Stewart–Haas Racing	Ford
6	Trevor Bayne (W)	Roush Fenway Racing	Ford
7	Danica Patrick	Premium Motorsports	Chevrolet
9	Chase Elliott	Hendrick Motorsports	Chevrolet
10	Aric Almirola	Stewart–Haas Racing	Ford
11	Denny Hamlin (W)	Joe Gibbs Racing	Toyota
12	Ryan Blaney	Team Penske	Ford
13	Ty Dillon	Germain Racing	Chevrolet
14	Clint Bowyer	Stewart–Haas Racing	Ford
17	Ricky Stenhouse Jr.	Roush Fenway Racing	Ford
18	Kyle Busch	Joe Gibbs Racing	Toyota
19	Daniel Suárez	Joe Gibbs Racing	Toyota
20	Erik Jones	Joe Gibbs Racing	Toyota
21	Paul Menard	Wood Brothers Racing	Ford
22	Joey Logano (W)	Team Penske	Ford
23	Gray Gaulding	BK Racing	Toyota
24	William Byron (R)	Hendrick Motorsports	Chevrolet
31	Ryan Newman (W)	Richard Childress Racing	Chevrolet
32	Matt DiBenedetto	Go Fas Racing	Ford
34	Michael McDowell	Front Row Motorsports	Ford
37	Chris Buescher	JTG Daugherty Racing	Chevrolet
38	David Ragan	Front Row Motorsports	Ford
41	Kurt Busch (W)	Stewart–Haas Racing	Ford
42	Kyle Larson	Chip Ganassi Racing	Chevrolet
43	Bubba Wallace (R)	Richard Petty Motorsports	Chevrolet
47	A. J. Allmendinger	JTG Daugherty Racing	Chevrolet
48	Jimmie Johnson (W)	Hendrick Motorsports	Chevrolet
51	Justin Marks (i)	Rick Ware Racing	Chevrolet
62	Brendan Gaughan	Beard Motorsports	Chevrolet
66	Mark Thompson	MBM Motorsports	Ford
72	Corey LaJoie	TriStar Motorsports	Chevrolet
78	Martin Truex Jr.	Furniture Row Racing	Toyota
88	Alex Bowman	Hendrick Motorsports	Chevrolet
92	David Gilliland (i)	RBR Enterprises	Ford
95	Kasey Kahne	Leavine Family Racing	Chevrolet
96	D. J. Kennington	Gaunt Brothers Racing	Toyota
Official entry list

- (R) Denotes Rookie of the Year candidate.
- (i) Denotes driver has declared for another NASCAR national touring series championship and is thus ineligible for Monster Energy NASCAR Cup Series championship points.
- (W) denotes past winner of the 500.

== Practice ==
=== First practice (February 10) ===
Kyle Busch was the fastest in the first practice session with a time of 45.058 seconds and a speed of 199.743 mph (321.455 km/h).

Pos	No.	Driver	Team	Manufacturer	Time	Speed
1	18	Kyle Busch	Joe Gibbs Racing	Toyota	45.058	199.743
2	11	Denny Hamlin	Joe Gibbs Racing	Toyota	45.085	199.623
3	19	Daniel Suárez	Joe Gibbs Racing	Toyota	45.088	199.610
Official first practice results

=== Second practice (February 10) ===
William Byron was the fastest in the second practice session with a time of 44.625 seconds and a speed of 201.681 mph (324.574 km/h).

Pos	No.	Driver	Team	Manufacturer	Time	Speed
1	24	William Byron (R)	Hendrick Motorsports	Chevrolet	44.625	201.681
2	17	Ricky Stenhouse Jr.	Roush Fenway Racing	Ford	44.632	201.649
3	22	Joey Logano	Team Penske	Ford	44.641	201.608
Official second practice results

== Qualifying ==
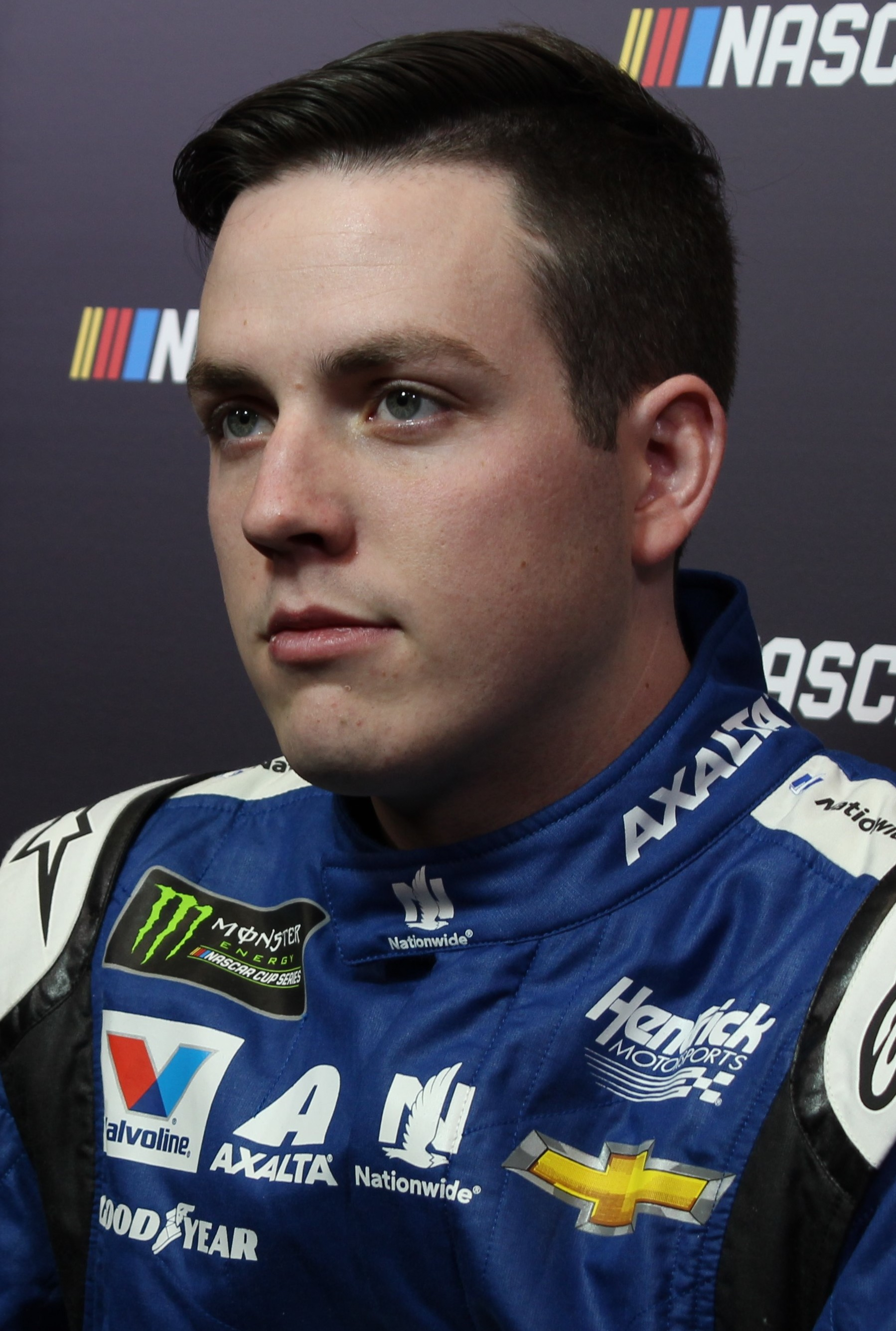
Alex Bowman scored the pole position, the fourth straight for Hendrick Motorsports.

Alex Bowman scored the pole for the race with a time of 46.002 and a speed of 195.644 mph (314.858 km/h).

=== Qualifying results ===
Pos	No	Driver	Team	Manufacturer	R1	R2
1	88	Alex Bowman	Hendrick Motorsports	Chevrolet	46.181	46.002
2	11	Denny Hamlin	Joe Gibbs Racing	Toyota	46.201	46.132
3	48	Jimmie Johnson	Hendrick Motorsports	Chevrolet	46.420	46.217
4	18	Kyle Busch	Joe Gibbs Racing	Toyota	46.366	46.224
5	24	William Byron (R)	Hendrick Motorsports	Chevrolet	46.328	46.261
6	20	Erik Jones	Joe Gibbs Racing	Toyota	46.513	46.279
7	19	Daniel Suárez	Joe Gibbs Racing	Toyota	46.412	46.280
8	4	Kevin Harvick	Stewart–Haas Racing	Ford	46.420	46.281
9	17	Ricky Stenhouse Jr.	Roush Fenway Racing	Ford	46.313	46.381
10	9	Chase Elliott	Hendrick Motorsports	Chevrolet	46.534	46.413
11	22	Joey Logano	Team Penske	Ford	46.422	46.437
12	21	Paul Menard	Wood Brothers Racing	Ford	46.470	46.584
13	10	Aric Almirola	Stewart–Haas Racing	Ford	46.539	—
14	3	Austin Dillon	Richard Childress Racing	Chevrolet	46.546	—
15	12	Ryan Blaney	Team Penske	Ford	46.577	—
16	14	Clint Bowyer	Stewart–Haas Racing	Ford	46.658	—
17	41	Kurt Busch	Stewart–Haas Racing	Ford	46.678	—
18	95	Kasey Kahne	Leavine Family Racing	Chevrolet	46.694	—
19	2	Brad Keselowski	Team Penske	Ford	46.698	—
20	6	Trevor Bayne	Roush Fenway Racing	Ford	46.781	—
21	31	Ryan Newman	Richard Childress Racing	Chevrolet	46.816	—
22	42	Kyle Larson	Chip Ganassi Racing	Chevrolet	46.817	—
23	1	Jamie McMurray	Chip Ganassi Racing	Chevrolet	46.836	—
24	34	Michael McDowell	Front Row Motorsports	Ford	46.899	—
25	43	Bubba Wallace (R)	Richard Petty Motorsports	Chevrolet	46.938	—
26	78	Martin Truex Jr.	Furniture Row Racing	Toyota	47.002	—
27	13	Ty Dillon	Germain Racing	Chevrolet	47.074	—
28	7	Danica Patrick	Premium Motorsports	Chevrolet	47.081	—
29	37	Chris Buescher	JTG Daugherty Racing	Chevrolet	47.095	—
30	47	A. J. Allmendinger	JTG Daugherty Racing	Chevrolet	47.144	—
31	62	Brendan Gaughan	Beard Motorsports	Chevrolet	47.398	—
32	51	Justin Marks (i)	Rick Ware Racing	Chevrolet	47.464	—
33	32	Matt DiBenedetto	Go Fas Racing	Ford	47.675	—
34	96	D. J. Kennington	Gaunt Brothers Racing	Toyota	47.848	—
35	00	Jeffrey Earnhardt	StarCom Racing	Chevrolet	47.866	—
36	92	David Gilliland (i)	RBR Enterprises	Ford	47.884	—
37	66	Mark Thompson	MBM Motorsports	Ford	48.267	—
38	72	Corey LaJoie	TriStar Motorsports	Chevrolet	48.372	—
39	23	Gray Gaulding	BK Racing	Toyota	0.000	—
40	38	David Ragan	Front Row Motorsports	Ford	0.000	—
Official qualifying results

== Can-Am Duels ==
The Can-Am Duels are a pair of NASCAR Sprint Cup Series races held in conjunction with the Daytona 500 annually in February at Daytona International Speedway. They consist of two races 60 laps and 150 miles (240 km) in length, which serve as heat races that set the lineup for the Daytona 500. The first race sets the lineup for cars that qualified in odd-numbered positions on pole qualifying day, while the second race sets the lineup for cars that qualified in even-numbered positions. The Duels set the lineup for positions 3–38, while positions 39 and 40 are filled by the two "Open" (teams without a charter) cars that set the fastest times in qualifying, but did not lock in a spot in the Duels.

For championship purposes, each Duel is a full Championship Stage, except there is no playoff point awarded. The top ten drivers receive championship points.

=== Duel 1 ===
==== Duel 1 results ====
Pos	Grid	No	Driver	Team	Manufacturer	Laps	Points
1	8	12	Ryan Blaney	Team Penske	Ford	63	10
2	6	22	Joey Logano	Team Penske	Ford	63	9
3	13	43	Bubba Wallace (R)	Richard Petty Motorsports	Chevrolet	63	8
4	5	17	Ricky Stenhouse Jr.	Roush Fenway Racing	Ford	63	7
5	9	41	Kurt Busch	Stewart–Haas Racing	Ford	63	6
6	11	31	Ryan Newman	Richard Childress Racing	Chevrolet	63	5
7	20	38	David Ragan	Front Row Motorsports	Ford	63	4
8	4	19	Daniel Suárez	Joe Gibbs Racing	Toyota	63	3
9	12	1	Jamie McMurray	Chip Ganassi Racing	Chevrolet	63	2
10	15	37	Chris Buescher	JTG Daugherty Racing	Chevrolet	63	1
11	14	13	Ty Dillon	Germain Racing	Chevrolet	63	0
12	16	62	Brendan Gaughan	Beard Motorsports	Chevrolet	63	0
13	18	00	Jeffrey Earnhardt	StarCom Racing	Chevrolet	63	0
14	1	88	Alex Bowman	Hendrick Motorsports	Chevrolet	63	0
15	17	51	Justin Marks (i)	Rick Ware Racing	Chevrolet	63	0
16	10	2	Brad Keselowski	Team Penske	Ford	57	0
17	19	92	David Gilliland (i)	RBR Enterprises	Ford	47	0
18	3	24	William Byron (R)	Hendrick Motorsports	Chevrolet	38	0
19	2	48	Jimmie Johnson	Hendrick Motorsports	Chevrolet	8	0
20	7	10	Aric Almirola	Stewart–Haas Racing	Ford	8	0
Official race results

=== Duel 2 ===
==== Duel 2 results ====
Pos	Grid	No	Driver	Team	Manufacturer	Laps	Points
1	5	9	Chase Elliott	Hendrick Motorsports	Chevrolet	60	10
2	4	4	Kevin Harvick	StewartHaas Racing	Ford	60	9
3	3	20	Erik Jones	Joe Gibbs Racing	Toyota	60	8
4	8	14	Clint Bowyer	Stewart–Haas Racing	Ford	60	7
5	2	18	Kyle Busch	Joe Gibbs Racing	Toyota	60	6
6	7	3	Austin Dillon	Richard Childress Racing	Chevrolet	60	5
7	6	21	Paul Menard	Wood Brothers Racing	Ford	60	4
8	10	6	Trevor Bayne	Roush Fenway Racing	Ford	60	3
9	1	11	Denny Hamlin	Joe Gibbs Racing	Toyota	60	2
10	15	47	A. J. Allmendinger	JTG Daugherty Racing	Chevrolet	60	1
11	12	34	Michael McDowell	Front Row Motorsports	Ford	60	0
12	13	78	Martin Truex Jr.	Furniture Row Racing	Toyota	60	0
13	9	95	Kasey Kahne	Leavine Family Racing	Chevrolet	60	0
14	14	7	Danica Patrick	Premium Motorsports	Chevrolet	60	0
15	17	96	D. J. Kennington	Gaunt Brothers Racing	Toyota	58	0
16	19	72	Corey LaJoie	TriStar Motorsports	Chevrolet	58	0
17	20	23	Gray Gaulding	BK Racing	Toyota	55	0
18	18	66	Mark Thompson	MBM Motorsports	Ford	32	0
19	16	32	Matt DiBenedetto	Go Fas Racing	Ford	11	0
20	11	42	Kyle Larson	Chip Ganassi Racing	Chevrolet	11	0
Official race results

=== Starting lineup ===
Pos	No.	Driver	Team	Manufacturer	Notes
1	88	Alex Bowman	Hendrick Motorsports	Chevrolet	Fastest in pole qualifying
2	11	Denny Hamlin	Joe Gibbs Racing	Toyota	Second in pole qualifying
3	12	Ryan Blaney	Team Penske	Ford	Duel race #1 winner
4	9	Chase Elliott	Hendrick Motorsports	Chevrolet	Duel race #2 winner
5	22	Joey Logano	Team Penske	Ford	Second in Duel 1
6	4	Kevin Harvick	Stewart–Haas Racing	Ford	Second in Duel 2
7	43	Bubba Wallace (R)	Richard Petty Motorsports	Chevrolet	Third in Duel 1
8	20	Erik Jones	Joe Gibbs Racing	Toyota	Third in Duel 2
9	17	Ricky Stenhouse Jr.	Roush Fenway Racing	Ford	Fourth in Duel 1
10	14	Clint Bowyer	Stewart–Haas Racing	Ford	Fourth in Duel 2
11	41	Kurt Busch	Stewart–Haas Racing	Ford	Fifth in Duel 1
12	18	Kyle Busch	Joe Gibbs Racing	Toyota	Fifth in Duel 2
13	31	Ryan Newman	Richard Childress Racing	Chevrolet	Sixth in Duel 1
14	3	Austin Dillon	Richard Childress Racing	Chevrolet	Sixth in Duel 2
15	38	David Ragan	Front Row Motorsports	Ford	Seventh in Duel 1
16	21	Paul Menard	Wood Brothers Racing	Ford	Seventh in Duel 2
17	19	Daniel Suárez	Joe Gibbs Racing	Toyota	Eighth in Duel 1
18	6	Trevor Bayne	Roush Fenway Racing	Ford	Eighth in Duel 2
19	1	Jamie McMurray	Chip Ganassi Racing	Chevrolet	Ninth in Duel 1
20	47	A. J. Allmendinger	JTG Daugherty Racing	Chevrolet	10th in Duel 2
21	37	Chris Buescher	JTG Daugherty Racing	Chevrolet	10th in Duel 1
22	34	Michael McDowell	Front Row Motorsports	Ford	11th in Duel 2
23	13	Ty Dillon	Germain Racing	Chevrolet	11th in Duel 1
24	78	Martin Truex Jr.	Furniture Row Racing	Toyota	12th in Duel 2
25	62	Brendan Gaughan	Beard Motorsports	Chevrolet	12th in Duel 1
26	95	Kasey Kahne	Leavine Family Racing	Chevrolet	13th in Duel 2
27	00	Jeffrey Earnhardt	StarCom Racing	Chevrolet	13th in Duel 1
28	7	Danica Patrick	Premium Motorsports	Chevrolet	14th in Duel 2
29	51	Justin Marks (i)	Rick Ware Racing	Chevrolet	15th in Duel 1
30	96	D. J. Kennington	Gaunt Brothers Racing	Toyota	15th in Duel 2
31	2	Brad Keselowski	Team Penske	Ford	16th in Duel 1
32	72	Corey LaJoie	TriStar Motorsports	Chevrolet	16th in Duel 2
33	24	William Byron (R)	Hendrick Motorsports	Chevrolet	18th in Duel 1
34	23	Gray Gaulding	BK Racing	Toyota	17th in Duel 2
35	48	Jimmie Johnson	Hendrick Motorsports	Chevrolet	19th in Duel 1
36	32	Matt DiBenedetto	Go Fas Racing	Ford	19th in Duel 2
37	10	Aric Almirola	Stewart–Haas Racing	Ford	20th in Duel 1
38	42	Kyle Larson	Chip Ganassi Racing	Chevrolet	20th in Duel 2
39	92	David Gilliland (i)	RBR Enterprises	Ford	Qualifying speed
40	66	Mark Thompson	MBM Motorsports	Ford	Qualifying speed
Official starting lineup

== Practice (post–Duels) ==
=== Third practice (February 16) ===
Daniel Suárez was the fastest in the third practice session with a time of 45.036 seconds and a speed of 199.840 mph (321.611 km/h).

Pos	No.	Driver	Team	Manufacturer	Time	Speed
1	19	Daniel Suárez	Joe Gibbs Racing	Toyota	45.036	199.840
2	11	Denny Hamlin	Joe Gibbs Racing	Toyota	45.058	199.743
3	78	Martin Truex Jr.	Furniture Row Racing	Toyota	45.069	199.694
Official third practice results

=== Fourth practice (February 16) ===
Daniel Suárez was the fastest in the fourth practice session with a time of 44.296 seconds and a speed of 203.179 mph (326.985 km/h).

Pos	No.	Driver	Team	Manufacturer	Time	Speed
1	19	Daniel Suárez	Joe Gibbs Racing	Toyota	44.296	203.179
2	31	Ryan Newman	Richard Childress Racing	Chevrolet	44.347	202.945
3	34	Michael McDowell	Front Row Motorsports	Ford	44.364	202.867
Official fourth practice results

=== Final practice (February 17) ===
Bubba Wallace was the fastest in the final practice session with a time of 45.696 seconds and a speed of 196.954 mph (316.967 km/h).

Pos	No.	Driver	Team	Manufacturer	Time	Speed
1	43	Bubba Wallace (R)	Richard Petty Motorsports	Chevrolet	45.696	196.954
2	19	Daniel Suárez	Joe Gibbs Racing	Toyota	45.795	196.528
3	31	Ryan Newman	Richard Childress Racing	Chevrolet	45.810	196.464
Official final practice results

== Race ==
=== Stage 1 ===
==== Start ====
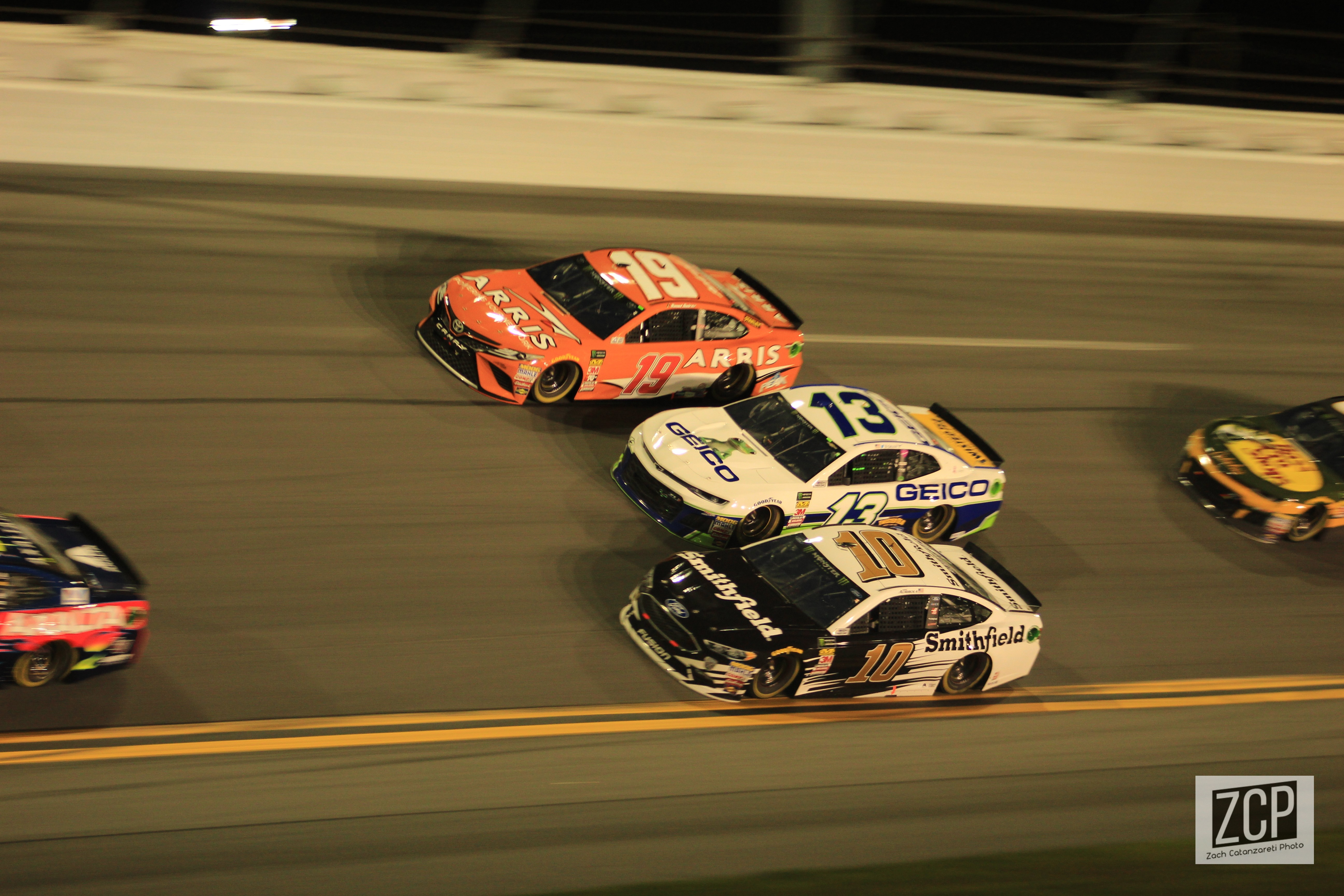
Aric Almirola (10), Ty Dillon (13), and Daniel Suárez (19) going three-wide during the race.

The 60th running of the Daytona 500 began with Alex Bowman leading the field to the green flag. Denny Hamlin took the lead on lap 1 and led the first 10 laps. The first caution of the race came out on lap 9 when Corey LaJoie blew an engine in Turn 2, and Hamlin was penalized one lap for pitting outside his box prior to the caution.

Racing resumed on lap 13. Kyle Busch's tire went flat on lap 30 and had to pit, dropping him from 5th to 38th to get his tire fixed. The second caution came out on lap 52 for a three-car wreck in turn 3. Kyle Busch spun out prior to the same time his tire went flat. The first ten cars did not opt to pit, waiting instead for the end of the first 60-lap stage, the second points-paying stage of the year (the Duels count as a championship points stage, but not a playoff points stage).

The race went back to green on lap 56, with five laps remaining in the first stage. On Lap 60, the final lap of the stage, a major pileup occurred on the end of the backstretch, bringing out the third caution flag of the race. The crash was triggered when Ricky Stenhouse Jr. attempted to block Ryan Blaney battling for second. Stenhouse briefly lost control of his car before saving it, but the resulting slowdown led to Erik Jones spinning in front of the field and starting the wreck. As the stage ended under caution 2017 Daytona 500 champion and leader Kurt Busch won the stage. A total of nine cars was involved in the melee, including William Byron, Erik Jones, Ty Dillon, Daniel Suárez, Jimmie Johnson, Ricky Stenhouse Jr., Ryan Blaney, Martin Truex Jr., and Kyle Larson. A total of four cars were out of the race, including Jimmie Johnson, Daniel Suárez, Erik Jones, and Ty Dillon.

=== Stage 2 ===
Stage 1 winner Kurt Busch was penalized for missing his pit box on the ensuing round of pit stops.

Racing restarted on lap 67. Ryan Blaney assumed the lead on lap 68 and led 26 laps until Paul Menard took the lead from Blaney on lap 94 and led one lap, but debris on the back straightaway brought out the fourth caution of the race on lap 94, from William Byron's car, and Martin Truex Jr. chose not to pit and he took the lead a lap later.

Racing resumed on lap 97. The fifth caution of the race came out for a seven-car wreck in turn 3 another (The Big One) involving Chase Elliott, Danica Patrick, Kevin Harvick, David Ragan, Martin Truex Jr., Brad Keselowski, and Kasey Kahne. A total of eleven cars were out of the race.

Restart occurred on Lap 109 for a 12-lap shootout to the end of the second stage, which Ryan Blaney won, claiming the ten championship and one playoff point after crossing the line to complete Lap 120.

=== Final stage ===
Back to the green flag with 73 to go, Denny Hamlin took the lead with 28 to go and led 3 laps, and Ryan Blaney assumed the lead with 26 to go and led 26 laps. The caution flew for the seventh time with 9 to go for a single-car spin as William Byron spun out into turn 2, so that meant Joey Logano won the free pass under caution.

Racing resumed with 6 to go and a major multi-car wreck (a third "The Big One") brought out the eighth caution of the race. 2017 Daytona 500 winner Kurt Busch tried to pass Denny Hamlin but contact behind him triggered the melee. A total of twelve cars were involved including Kurt Busch, Martin Truex Jr., Matt DiBenedetto, Ricky Stenhouse Jr., Ryan Blaney, Alex Bowman, Ryan Newman, Joey Logano, Bubba Wallace, Jeffrey Earnhardt, Brendan Gaughan, and A. J. Allmendinger. The multi-car wreck sent the race into overtime.

=== Overtime ===
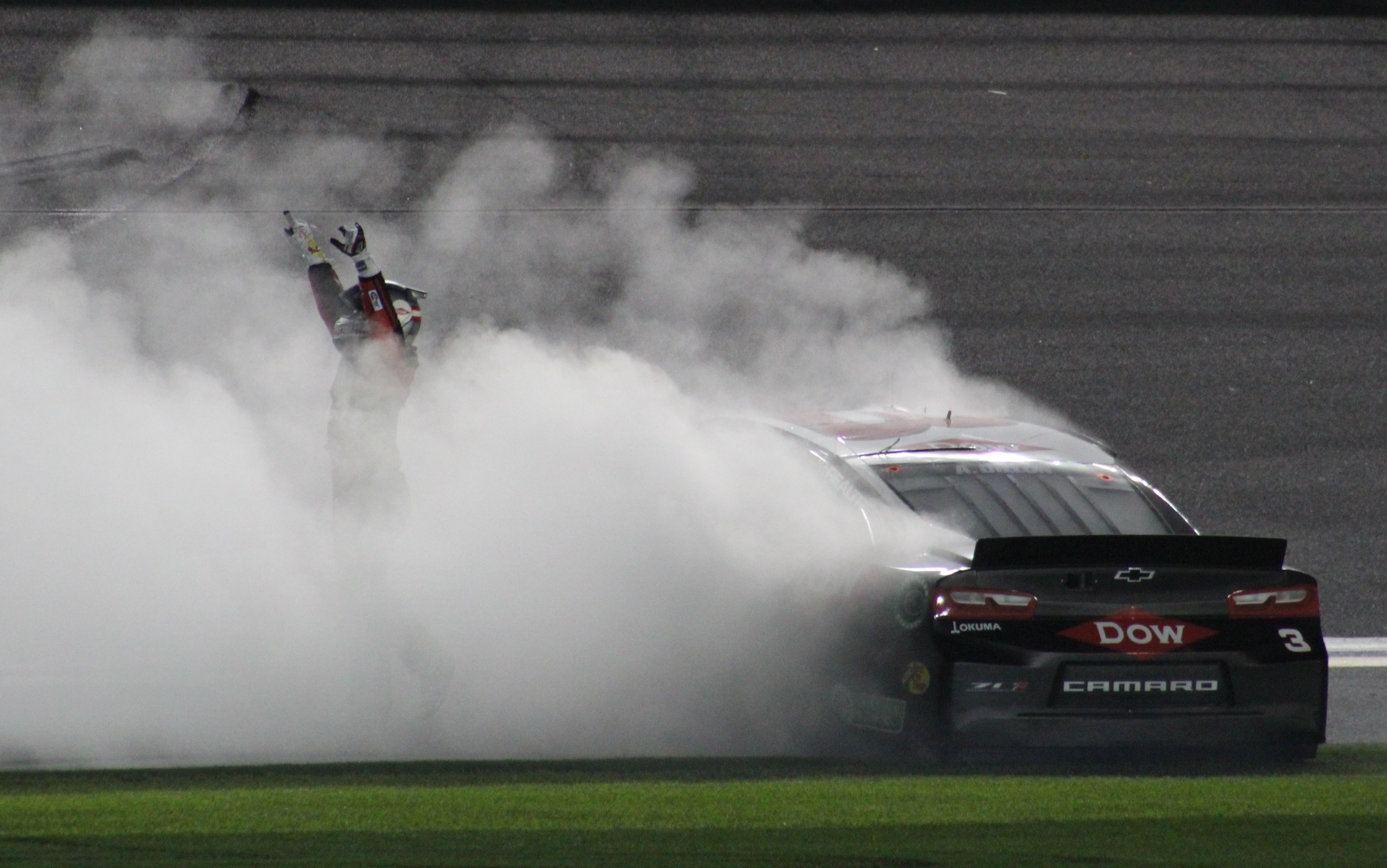
Austin Dillon celebrating victory lap.

The race resumed on lap 205 of 200 advertised, for a 2-lap NASCAR Overtime. Aric Almirola was leading at the white flag, but a mistimed block on the super stretch forced Austin Dillon to drive into his right-rear corner and turn Almirola into the wall. Dillon drove on and scored his second career NASCAR Monster Energy Cup Series victory along with Dillon’s first career Daytona 500 victory, 20 years after Dale Earnhardt won the 1998 Daytona 500 in the same seat. After the September 2017 closure of the deal between Dillon's sponsor Dow Chemical to acquire E. I. DuPont and Nemours (which had been a NASCAR sponsor from 1992 to 2012), this win was the first for the merged DowDuPont, bringing together two major race-winning sponsors.

==== Post race ====
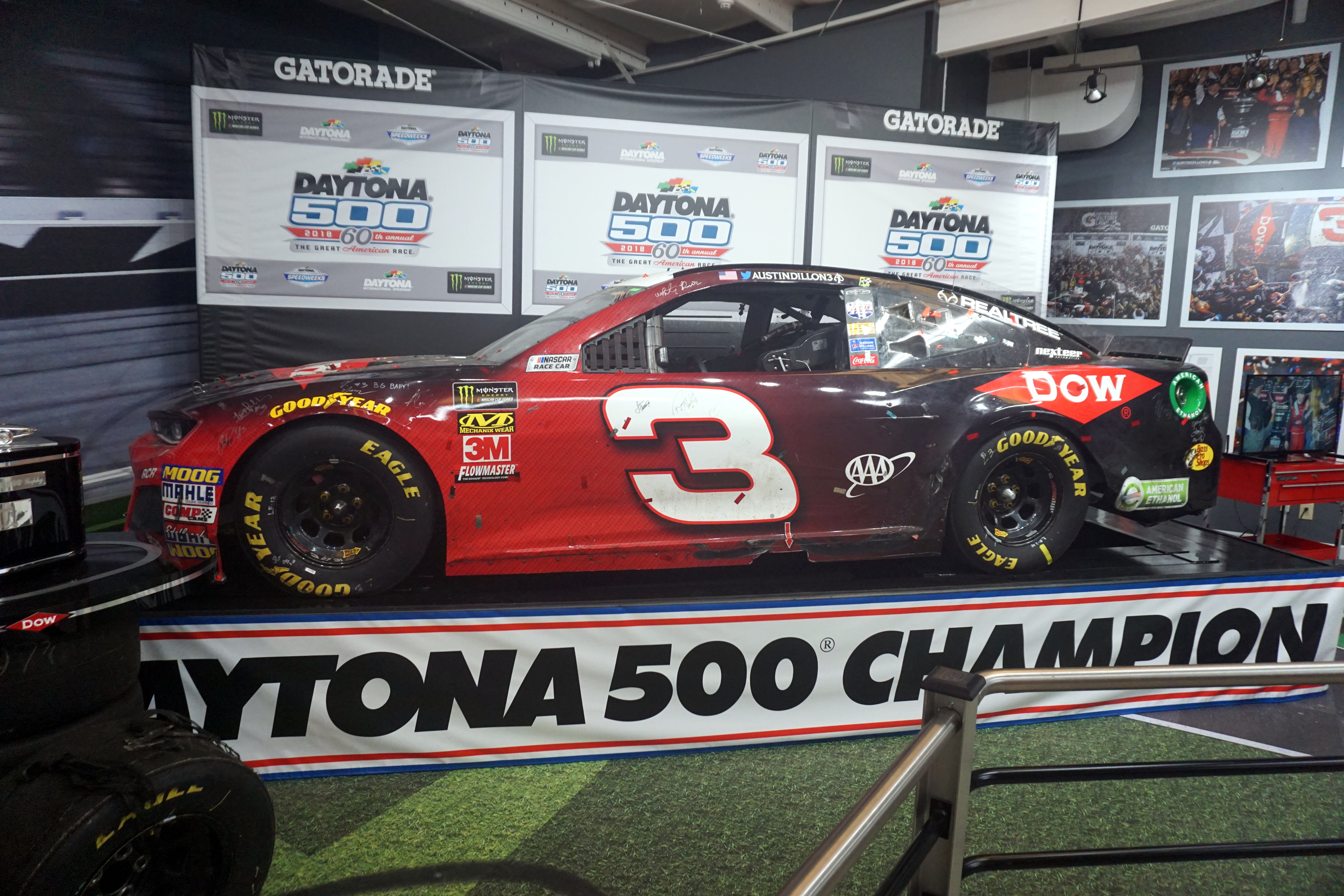
Austin Dillon's 2018 Daytona 500-winning No. 3 Dow Chemical Company Chevrolet Camaro

"I did what I had to do in the end; I hate it for the 10 Guys" said Dillon, after a series of burnouts. This was in reference to contact between the two on the final lap.

=== Race results ===
==== Stage Results ====
Stage One Laps: 60

Pos	No	Driver	Team	Manufacturer	Points
1	41	Kurt Busch	Stewart–Haas Racing	Ford	10
2	88	Alex Bowman	Hendrick Motorsports	Chevrolet	9
3	12	Ryan Blaney	Team Penske	Ford	8
4	17	Ricky Stenhouse Jr.	Roush Fenway Racing	Ford	7
5	78	Martin Truex Jr.	Furniture Row Racing	Toyota	6
6	34	Michael McDowell	Front Row Motorsports	Ford	5
7	4	Kevin Harvick	Stewart–Haas Racing	Ford	4
8	9	Chase Elliott	Hendrick Motorsports	Chevrolet	3
9	21	Paul Menard	Wood Brothers Racing	Ford	2
10	6	Trevor Bayne	Roush Fenway Racing	Ford	1
Official stage one results

Stage Two Laps: 60

Pos	No	Driver	Team	Manufacturer	Points
1	12	Ryan Blaney	Team Penske	Ford	10
2	21	Paul Menard	Wood Brothers Racing	Ford	9
3	22	Joey Logano	Team Penske	Ford	8
4	10	Aric Almirola	Stewart–Haas Racing	Ford	7
5	34	Michael McDowell	Front Row Motorsports	Ford	6
6	78	Martin Truex Jr.	Furniture Row Racing	Toyota	5
7	43	Bubba Wallace (R)	Richard Petty Motorsports	Chevrolet	4
8	6	Trevor Bayne	Roush Fenway Racing	Ford	3
9	3	Austin Dillon	Richard Childress Racing	Chevrolet	2
10	11	Denny Hamlin	Joe Gibbs Racing	Toyota	1
Official stage two results

=== Final Stage Results ===
Stage Three Laps: 80

Pos	Grid	No	Driver	Team	Manufacturer	Laps	Points
1	14	3	Austin Dillon	Richard Childress Racing	Chevrolet	207	42
2	7	43	Bubba Wallace (R)	Richard Petty Motorsports	Chevrolet	207	39
3	2	11	Denny Hamlin	Joe Gibbs Racing	Toyota	207	35
4	5	22	Joey Logano	Team Penske	Ford	207	41
5	21	37	Chris Buescher	JTG Daugherty Racing	Chevrolet	207	32
6	16	21	Paul Menard	Wood Brothers Racing	Ford	207	42
7	3	12	Ryan Blaney	Team Penske	Ford	207	48
8	13	31	Ryan Newman	Richard Childress Racing	Chevrolet	207	29
9	22	34	Michael McDowell	Front Row Motorsports	Ford	207	39
10	20	47	A. J. Allmendinger	JTG Daugherty Racing	Chevrolet	207	27
11	37	10	Aric Almirola	Stewart–Haas Racing	Ford	206	33
12	29	51	Justin Marks (i)	Rick Ware Racing	Chevrolet	206	0
13	18	6	Trevor Bayne	Roush Fenway Racing	Ford	206	28
14	39	92	David Gilliland (i)	RBR Enterprises	Ford	206	0
15	10	14	Clint Bowyer	Stewart–Haas Racing	Ford	206	22
16	19	1	Jamie McMurray	Chip Ganassi Racing	Chevrolet	205	21
17	1	88	Alex Bowman	Hendrick Motorsports	Chevrolet	205	29
18	24	78	Martin Truex Jr.	Furniture Row Racing	Toyota	205	30
19	38	42	Kyle Larson	Chip Ganassi Racing	Chevrolet	204	18
20	34	23	Gray Gaulding	BK Racing	Toyota	204	17
21	27	00	Jeffrey Earnhardt	StarCom Racing	Chevrolet	204	16
22	40	66	Mark Thompson	MBM Motorsports	Ford	203	15
23	33	24	William Byron (R)	Hendrick Motorsports	Chevrolet	203	14
24	30	96	D. J. Kennington	Gaunt Brothers Racing	Toyota	201	13
25	12	18	Kyle Busch	Joe Gibbs Racing	Toyota	200	12
26	11	41	Kurt Busch	Stewart–Haas Racing	Ford	198	21
27	36	32	Matt DiBenedetto	Go Fas Racing	Ford	198	10
28	25	62	Brendan Gaughan	Beard Motorsports	Chevrolet	198	9
29	9	17	Ricky Stenhouse Jr.	Roush Fenway Racing	Ford	197	15
30	15	38	David Ragan	Front Row Motorsports	Ford	107	7
31	6	4	Kevin Harvick	Stewart–Haas Racing	Ford	105	10
32	31	2	Brad Keselowski	Team Penske	Ford	102	5
33	4	9	Chase Elliott	Hendrick Motorsports	Chevrolet	101	7
34	26	95	Kasey Kahne	Leavine Family Racing	Chevrolet	101	3
35	28	7	Danica Patrick	Premium Motorsports	Chevrolet	101	2
36	8	20	Erik Jones	Joe Gibbs Racing	Toyota	59	1
37	17	19	Daniel Suárez	Joe Gibbs Racing	Toyota	59	1
38	35	48	Jimmie Johnson	Hendrick Motorsports	Chevrolet	59	1
39	23	13	Ty Dillon	Germain Racing	Chevrolet	59	1
40	32	72	Corey LaJoie	TriStar Motorsports	Chevrolet	8	1
Official race results

=== Racing statistics ===
- 24 lead changes among 14 drivers
- 8 cautions for 37 laps
- Time of race: 3 hours, 26 minutes and 58 seconds
- Average speed: 150.551 miles per hour (242.288 km/h)
- Margin of victory: 0.260 seconds

== Media ==
=== Television ===
Since 2001—with the exception of 2002, 2004 and 2006—the Daytona 500 has been carried by Fox in the United States. The booth crew consisted of longtime NASCAR lap-by-lap announcer Mike Joy, three–time Daytona 500 champion Jeff Gordon, and 1989 race winner Darrell Waltrip. Pit road was manned by Jamie Little, Regan Smith, Vince Welch and Matt Yocum.

Fox Television
Booth announcers	Pit reporters
Lap-by-lap: Mike Joy; Color-commentator: Jeff Gordon; Color commentator: Darrell Waltrip	Jamie Little; Regan Smith; Vince Welch; Matt Yocum

=== Radio ===
The race was broadcast on radio by the Motor Racing Network—who has covered the Daytona 500 since 1970—and simulcast on Sirius XM NASCAR Radio. The booth crew consisted of longtime announcer Joe Moore, Jeff Striegle and 1989 Cup Series champion Rusty Wallace. Longtime turn announcer – and prodigy of MRN co-founder Ken Squier – Dave Moody was the lead turn announcer. He called the Daytona 500 from atop the Sunoco tower outside the exit of turn 2 when the field was racing through turns 1 and 2. Mike Bagley worked the backstretch for the Daytona 500 from a spotter's stand on the inside of the track. Kyle Rickey called the Daytona 500 when the field was racing through turns 3 and 4 from the Sunoco tower outside the exit of turn 4. On pit road, MRN was manned by lead pit reporter and NASCAR Hall of Fame Executive Director Winston Kelley. He was joined on pit road by Steve Post, Kim Coon and Alex Hayden.

MRN Radio
Booth announcers	Turn announcers	Pit reporters
Lead announcer: Joe Moore; Announcer: Jeff Striegle; Announcer: Rusty Wallace	Turns 1 & 2: Dave Moody; Backstretch: Mike Bagley; Turns 3 & 4: Kyle Rickey	Alex Hayden; Winston Kelley; Kim Coon; Steve Post

== Standings after the race ==
Drivers' Championship standings

Pos	Driver	Points
1	Ryan Blaney	58
2	Joey Logano	50 (–8)
3	Austin Dillon	47 (–11)
4	Bubba Wallace	47 (–11)
5	Paul Menard	46 (–12)
6	Michael McDowell	39 (–9)
7	Denny Hamlin	37 (–21)
8	Ryan Newman	34 (–24)
9	Chris Buescher	33 (–25)
10	Aric Almirola	33 (–25)
11	Trevor Bayne	31 (–27)
12	Martin Truex Jr.	30 (–18)
13	Clint Bowyer	29 (–19)
14	Alex Bowman	29 (–19)
15	A. J. Allmendinger	28 (–30)
16	Kurt Busch	27 (–31)
Official driver's standings

Manufacturers' Championship standings

Pos	Manufacturer	Points
1	Chevrolet	40
2	Toyota	34 (–6)
3	Ford	33 (–7)
Official manufacturers' standings

- Note: Only the first 16 positions are included for the driver standings.

== Notes ==
Previous race: 2017 Ford EcoBoost 400	Monster Energy NASCAR Cup Series; 2018 season	Next race: 2018 Folds of Honor QuikTrip 500
