= Cartersville, Georgia =

- City
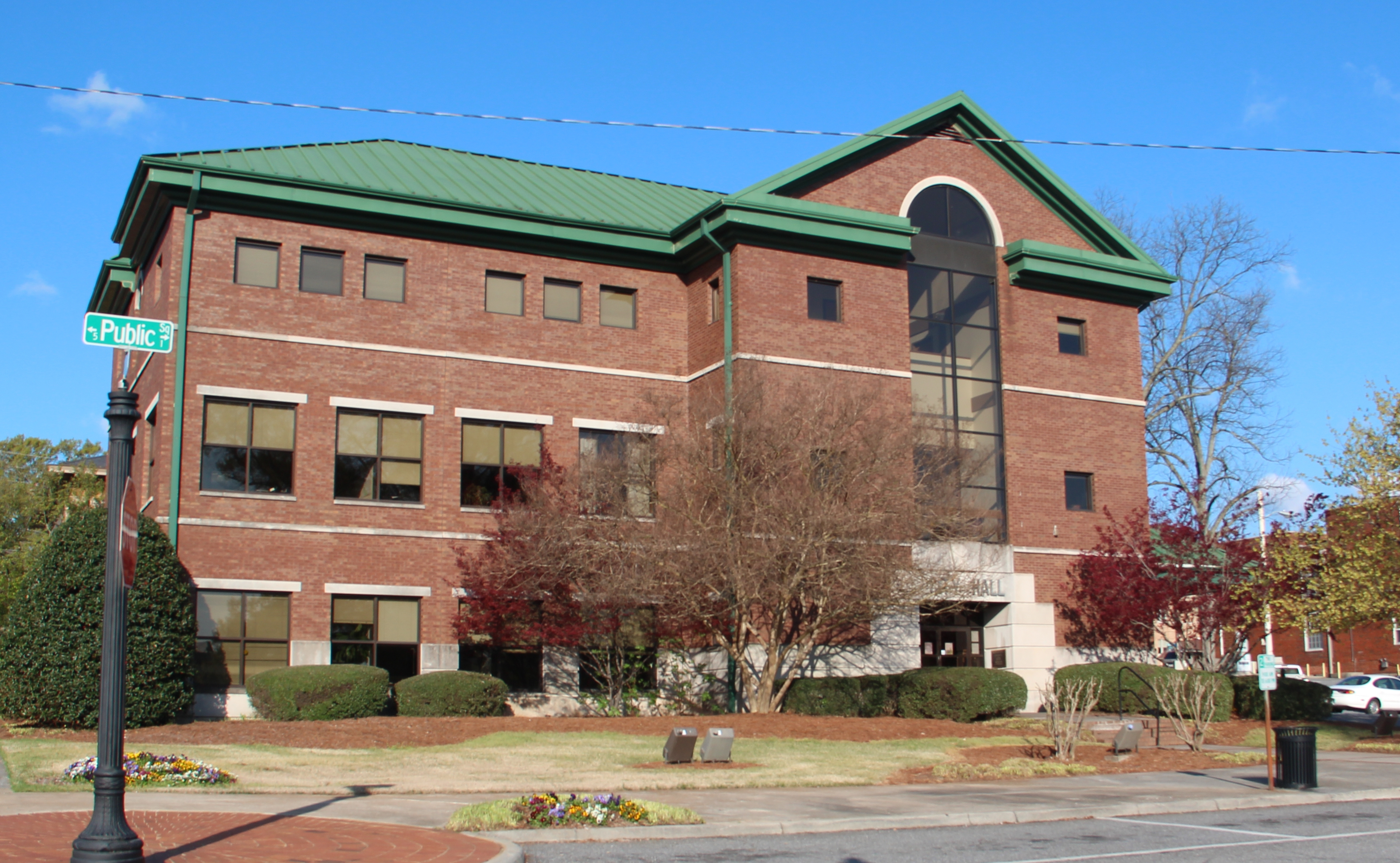
- Cartersville City Hall

- Seal Logo

- Location in Bartow County, Georgia

- Location of Cartersville in Metro Atlanta
- Coordinates: 34°11′N 84°48′W
- Country: United States
- State: Georgia
- County: Bartow
- Incorporated: 1850
- Named for: Farish Carter

Government
  - Mayor: Matt Santini

Area
  - Total: 28.74 sq mi (74.44 km^{2})
  - Land: 28.62 sq mi (74.12 km^{2})
  - Water: 0.12 sq mi (0.32 km^{2})
- Elevation: 787 ft (240 m)

Population (2020)
  - Total: 23,187
  - Density: 810.2/sq mi (312.82/km^{2})
- Time zone: UTC−5 (Eastern Time)
  - Summer (DST): UTC−4 (Eastern Daylight Time)
- ZIP Codes: 30120, 30121
- Area codes: 770; 678, 470, and 943
- FIPS code: 13-13688
- GNIS feature ID: 0355017
- Website: cartersvillega.gov

Cartersville is a city in and the county seat of Bartow County, Georgia, United States; it is located within the northwest edge of the Atlanta metropolitan area. As of the 2020 census, the city had a population of 23,187.

== History ==
Cartersville, originally known as Birmingham, was founded by English-Americans in 1832. The town was incorporated as Cartersville in 1854. The present name is for Col. Farish Carter of Milledgeville, the owner of a large plantation. Cartersville was the long-time home of Amos Akerman, U.S. attorney general under President Ulysses S. Grant; in that office Akerman spearheaded the federal prosecution of members of the Ku Klux Klan and was one of the most important public servants of the Reconstruction era.

Cartersville was designated the seat of Bartow County in 1867 following the destruction of Cassville by Sherman's March to the Sea in the American Civil War. Cartersville was incorporated as a city in 1872.

On February 26, 1916, a mob of fifty men and boys forcibly removed Jesse McCorkle, a Black man who had been arrested just the night before for allegedly assaulting a woman, from the jail. They lynched him by hanging him from a tree in front of city hall and then riddled his body with bullets.

== Geography ==
Cartersville is located in south-central Bartow County, 42 miles (68 km) northwest of downtown Atlanta and 76 miles (122 km) southeast of Chattanooga, Tennessee.

The Etowah River flows through a broad valley south of the downtown, leading west to Rome, where it forms the Coosa River, a tributary of the Alabama River. The city limits extend eastward, upriver, as far as Allatoona Dam, which forms Lake Allatoona, a large U.S. Army Corps of Engineers reservoir. Red Top Mountain State Park sits on a peninsula in the lake, just outside the city limits. Nancy Creek also flows in the vicinity. The highest point in the city is 1,562 feet (476 m) at the summit of Pine Mountain.

According to the U.S. Census Bureau, Cartersville has a total area of 29.3 square miles (75.9 km^{2}), of which 29.2 square miles (75.5 km^{2}) is land and 0.15 square miles (0.4 km^{2}), or 0.59%, is water.

=== Transportation ===
Interstate 75, the major north–south route through the area, passes through the eastern edge of the city, with access from five exits: Exit 285 just south of the city limits in Emerson, Exit 288 (East Main Street) closest to downtown, and exits 290, 293, and 296 along the city's northern outskirts. U.S. Highway 41, which is concurrent with State Route 3, is an older, parallel highway to Interstate 75 that goes through the eastern edge of downtown, leading north to Calhoun and Dalton and south to Marietta. U.S. Highway 411 passes through the northern edge of the city, leading west to Rome and north to Chatsworth. State Route 20 runs west to Rome concurrent with U.S. Highway 411 and runs east to Canton. State Route 61 runs north to White concurrent with U.S. Highway 411 and runs south to Dallas, Georgia. State Route 113 runs southwesterly to Rockmart. State Route 293 runs west-northwest to Kingston.

Cartersville Airport is a public use airport located on the west side of Cartersville on State Route 61. It is the home base of Phoenix Air.

=== Cartersville area communities ===
The following communities border the city:

- Adairsville (north-northwest)
- Cassville (north)
- Emerson (south)
- Euharlee (west)
- Kingston (northwest)
- Stilesboro (southwest)
- White (northern)
- Grassdale Road (west)

=== Climate ===
Climate data for Cartersville, Georgia (Cartersville Airport), 1991–2020 normals, extremes 1891–2019
Month	Jan	Feb	Mar	Apr	May	Jun	Jul	Aug	Sep	Oct	Nov	Dec	Year
Record high °F (°C)	79 (26)	83 (28)	88 (31)	93 (34)	100 (38)	106 (41)	108 (42)	108 (42)	106 (41)	100 (38)	87 (31)	82 (28)	108 (42)
Mean maximum °F (°C)	68.2 (20.1)	73.0 (22.8)	80.9 (27.2)	85.7 (29.8)	89.1 (31.7)	93.9 (34.4)	96.2 (35.7)	95.5 (35.3)	92.0 (33.3)	84.7 (29.3)	77.1 (25.1)	69.0 (20.6)	97.5 (36.4)
Mean daily maximum °F (°C)	52.2 (11.2)	56.8 (13.8)	64.9 (18.3)	73.4 (23.0)	80.7 (27.1)	86.9 (30.5)	89.6 (32.0)	89.1 (31.7)	84.2 (29.0)	74.0 (23.3)	62.9 (17.2)	54.5 (12.5)	72.4 (22.5)
Daily mean °F (°C)	41.8 (5.4)	45.5 (7.5)	52.5 (11.4)	60.2 (15.7)	68.3 (20.2)	75.6 (24.2)	78.8 (26.0)	78.1 (25.6)	72.5 (22.5)	61.6 (16.4)	50.8 (10.4)	44.3 (6.8)	60.8 (16.0)
Mean daily minimum °F (°C)	31.4 (−0.3)	34.3 (1.3)	40.2 (4.6)	47.0 (8.3)	56.0 (13.3)	64.2 (17.9)	68.0 (20.0)	67.2 (19.6)	60.7 (15.9)	49.1 (9.5)	38.7 (3.7)	34.0 (1.1)	49.2 (9.6)
Mean minimum °F (°C)	12.7 (−10.7)	17.0 (−8.3)	23.8 (−4.6)	30.6 (−0.8)	41.1 (5.1)	52.5 (11.4)	60.1 (15.6)	59.5 (15.3)	46.0 (7.8)	32.7 (0.4)	25.6 (−3.6)	16.0 (−8.9)	9.3 (−12.6)
Record low °F (°C)	−9 (−23)	−6 (−21)	8 (−13)	22 (−6)	31 (−1)	40 (4)	49 (9)	48 (9)	30 (−1)	23 (−5)	4 (−16)	−3 (−19)	−9 (−23)
Average precipitation inches (mm)	4.29 (109)	4.69 (119)	4.72 (120)	4.15 (105)	3.67 (93)	3.79 (96)	3.88 (99)	3.44 (87)	3.63 (92)	3.25 (83)	4.06 (103)	4.49 (114)	48.06 (1,220)
Average snowfall inches (cm)	0.4 (1.0)	0.1 (0.25)	0.0 (0.0)	0.0 (0.0)	0.0 (0.0)	0.0 (0.0)	0.0 (0.0)	0.0 (0.0)	0.0 (0.0)	0.0 (0.0)	0.0 (0.0)	0.1 (0.25)	0.6 (1.5)
Average precipitation days (≥ 0.01 in)	10.8	11.9	11.2	10.3	11.3	12.4	14.2	10.7	9.4	9.2	9.1	10.8	131.3
Average snowy days (≥ 0.1 in)	0.1	0.1	0.0	0.0	0.0	0.0	0.0	0.0	0.0	0.0	0.0	0.0	0.2
Source 1: NOAA (snow/snow days 1981–2010)
Source 2: National Weather Service (mean maxima/minima 1981–2010)

== Demographics ==
Historical population
Census	Pop.	Note	%±
1870	2,232		—
1880	2,037		−8.7%
1890	3,171		55.7%
1900	3,135		−1.1%
1910	4,067		29.7%
1920	4,350		7.0%
1930	5,250		20.7%
1940	6,141		17.0%
1950	7,270		18.4%
1960	8,668		19.2%
1970	10,138		17.0%
1980	9,247		−8.8%
1990	12,035		30.2%
2000	15,925		32.3%
2010	19,731		23.9%
2020	23,187		17.5%
2025 (est.)	25,349	▲	9.3%
U.S. Decennial Census; 1850-1870 1870-1880; 1890-1910 1920-1930; 1940 1950 1960; 1970 1980 1990; 2000 2010 2020; 2025

Cartersville first appeared as a town in the 1870 United States census. The city absorbed the census-delineated neighboring unincorporated community of Atco prior to the 1960 U.S. census.

=== Racial and ethnic composition ===
Cartersville, Georgia – racial and ethnic composition Note: the US Census treats Hispanic/Latino as an ethnic category. This table excludes Latinos from the racial categories and assigns them to a separate category. Hispanics/Latinos may be of any race.
Race / ethnicity (NH = Non-Hispanic)	Pop. 2000	Pop. 2010	Pop. 2020	% 2000	% 2010	2020
White alone (NH)	11,758	13,003	14,608	73.83%	65.90%	63.00%
Black or African American alone (NH)	2,682	3,592	4,144	16.84%	18.20%	17.87%
Native American or Alaska Native alone (NH)	37	45	50	0.23%	0.23%	0.22%
Asian alone (NH)	127	196	346	0.80%	0.99%	1.49%
Pacific Islander alone (NH)	7	42	11	0.04%	0.21%	0.05%
Some other race alone (NH)	15	19	88	0.09%	0.10%	0.38%
Mixed-race or multi-racial (NH)	139	329	889	0.87%	1.67%	3.83%
Hispanic or Latino (any race)	1,160	2,505	3,051	7.28%	12.70%	13.16%
Total	15,925	19,731	23,187	100.00%	100.00%	100.00%

=== 2020 census ===
As of the 2020 census, there were 23,187 people and 5,285 families residing in the city. The median age was 38.3 years. 23.4% of residents were under the age of 18 and 15.6% of residents were 65 years of age or older. For every 100 females there were 94.5 males, and for every 100 females age 18 and over there were 91.3 males age 18 and over.

94.6% of residents lived in urban areas, while 5.4% lived in rural areas.

There were 8,832 households in Cartersville, of which 33.5% had children under the age of 18 living in them. Of all households, 43.7% were married-couple households, 18.3% were households with a male householder and no spouse or partner present, and 31.5% were households with a female householder and no spouse or partner present. About 28.5% of all households were made up of individuals and 11.4% had someone living alone who was 65 years of age or older.

There were 9,256 housing units, of which 4.6% were vacant. The homeowner vacancy rate was 1.8% and the rental vacancy rate was 4.5%.

Racial composition as of the 2020 census
Race	Number	Percent
White	15,156	65.4%
Black or African American	4,195	18.1%
American Indian and Alaska Native	121	0.5%
Asian	350	1.5%
Native Hawaiian and Other Pacific Islander	13	0.1%
Some other race	1,673	7.2%
Two or more races	1,679	7.2%
Hispanic or Latino (of any race)	3,051	13.2%

=== 2010 census ===
As of the census of 2010, there were 19,010 people, 5,870 households, and 4,132 families residing in the city. The population of Cartersville is growing significantly. The population density was 680.7 inhabitants per square mile (262.8/km^{2}). There were 6,130 housing units at an average density of 262.0 per square mile (101.2/km^{2}). The racial makeup of the city was 63.93% White, 29.64% African American, 0.82% Asian, 0.28% Native American, 0.04% Pacific Islander, 3.76% from other races, and 1.53% from two or more races. Hispanic or Latino people of any race were 7.28% of the population.

There were 5,870 households, out of which 33.3% had children under the age of 18 living with them, 52.6% were married couples living together, 13.6% had a female householder with no husband present, and 29.6% were non-families. 25.9% of all households were made up of individuals, and 11.7% had someone living alone who was 65 years of age or older. The average household size was 2.59 and the average family size was 3.10.

In the city, the population was spread out, with 25.9% under the age of 18, 8.7% from 18 to 24, 30.2% from 25 to 44, 20.8% from 45 to 64, and 14.4% who were 65 years of age or older. The median age was 36 years. For every 100 females, there were 95.4 males. For every 100 females age 18 and over, there were 92.1 males.

The median income for a household in the city was $41,162, and the median income for a family was $48,219. Males had a median income of $35,092 versus $25,761 for females. The per capita income for the city was $19,977. About 8.9% of families and 11.4% of the population were below the poverty line, including 13.7% of those under age 18 and 15.4% of those age 65 or over.

== Points of interest ==
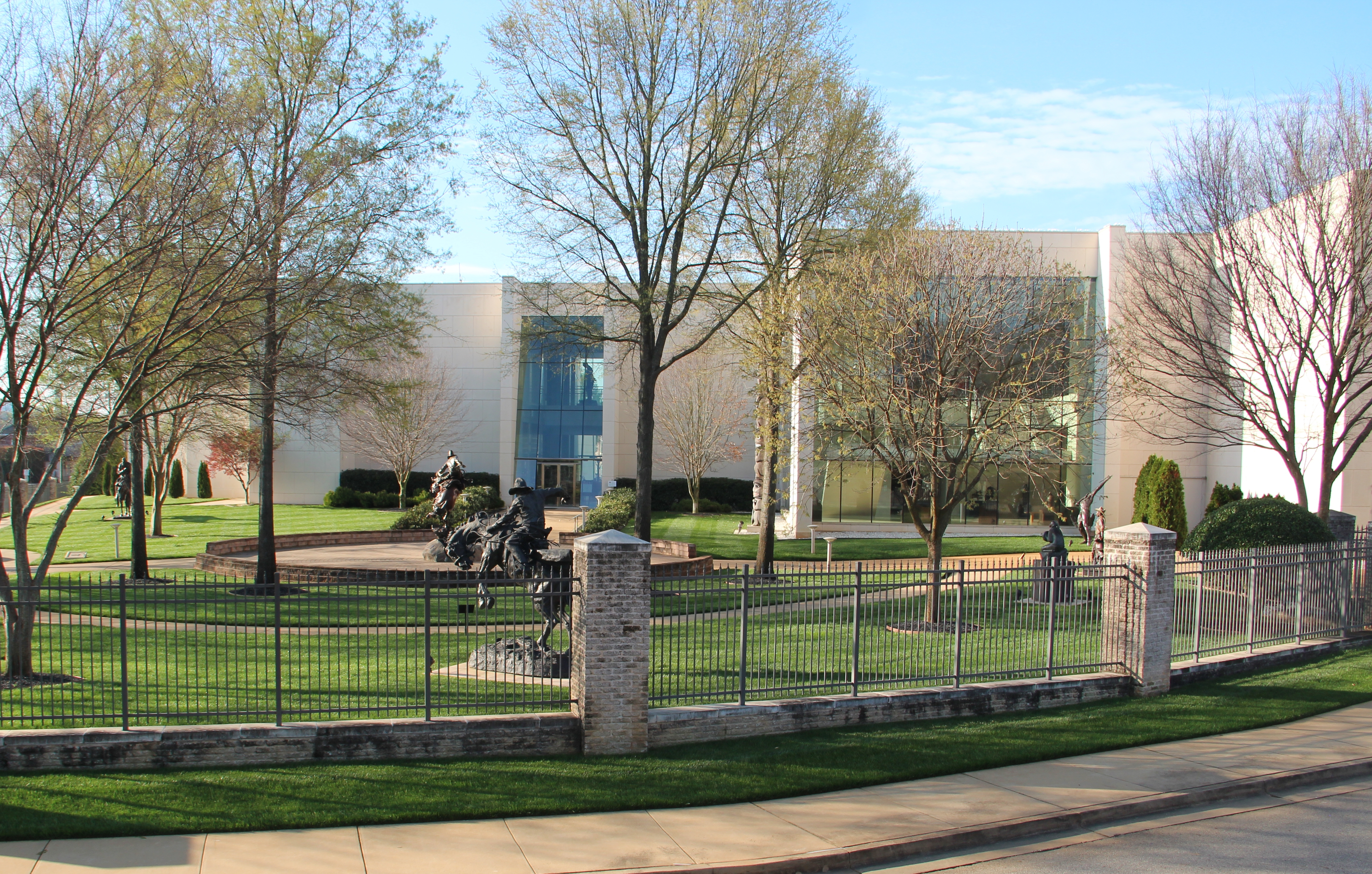
Booth Western Art Museum

- The Booth Western Art Museum is on North Museum Drive in Cartersville. The Booth is the second-largest art museum in Georgia, and houses the largest permanent exhibition space for Western art in the country. It is a Smithsonian Institution Affiliate.
- The Etowah Indian Mounds is an archaeological Native American site in Bartow County, south of Cartersville.
- Tellus Science Museum, formerly the Weinman Mineral Museum, is a Smithsonian Institution Affiliate and features the first digital planetarium in North Georgia. NASA has installed a camera that tracks meteors at the museum.
- The world's first outdoor Coca-Cola sign, painted in 1894, is located in downtown Cartersville on Kilwins Ice Cream's wall.
- Rose Lawn, a house museum, is the former home of noted evangelist Samuel Porter Jones, for whom the Union Gospel Tabernacle (Ryman Auditorium) in Nashville was built, later to become the Grand Ole Opry.
- The Bartow History Museum is located in the Old Cartersville Courthouse, c. 1870, in downtown Cartersville on East Church Street.
- The Savoy Automobile museum is a museum displaying a diverse collection of automobiles and original works of art.
- The Pine Mountain Recreation Area trails ascend to a summit at 1,562 feet overlooking Cartersville. Atlanta and Allatoona Lake can also be seen from the summit. The trails are maintained by City of Cartersville Parks & Recreation.

== Education ==
The schools that comprise the Cartersville City School District are:

- Cartersville Primary School
- Cartersville Elementary School
- Cartersville Middle School
- Cartersville High School

There is a private Montessori school:

- Lifesong Montessori School

Cartersville also has a college campus:

- Georgia Highlands College

== Economy ==
Manufacturing, tourism, and services play a part in the economy of the city. The city's employers include:

- Anheuser-Busch
- Georgia Power
- Komatsu
- Shaw Industries, a major flooring manufacturer
- Phoenix Air is based in the Cartersville Airport.

The city is home to Piedmont Cartersville Medical Center and the Hope Center, making it a minor healthcare hub for the surrounding area.

== Law enforcement ==
In 2017, the Cartersville Police Department arrested 65 people at a house party because of a suspicion that there was an ounce of marijuana at the party. The individuals arrested in this incident have been referred to as "The Cartersville 70" by the community. Many of these individuals remained in holding cells for several consecutive days. Some individuals detained during this incident have reported being denied access to their prescription medications while incarcerated. Several others lost their jobs. In 2022, a federal court awarded 45 of the arrested individuals a $900,000 settlement due to a violation of their constitutional rights.

On September 8, 2022, Deputy Police Chief Jason DiPrima resigned after being arrested in a prostitute police-sting operation.

== Notable people ==
- Amos Akerman (February 23, 1821 – December 21, 1880), politician who served as U.S. attorney general under President Ulysses S. Grant, 1870–1871
- Bill Arp (Charles Henry Smith; 1826–1903), nationally syndicated columnist
- Bella Bautista, beauty pageant titleholder and transgender rights activist
- Robert Benham, first African-American Georgia Supreme Court justice
- Ronnie Brown, NFL running back
- Bob Burns (1950–2015), founding member and original drummer of Lynyrd Skynyrd
- Rebecca Latimer Felton (1835–1930), prominent lynching advocate and first female U.S. senator
- Andre Fluellen, NFL defensive tackle
- W. J. Gordy, potter
- A. O. Granger (1846–1914), industrialist and founder of the Etowah Iron Company
- Ashton Hagans, NBA point guard
- Corra Harris, author
- Joe Frank Harris (1936–), former governor of Georgia
- Keith Henderson, former NFL running back
- Skip Henderson, former point guard for the Marshall Thundering Herd
- Caleb Henson, NCAA Wrestling National Champion
- Sam Howard, professional baseball player for the Pittsburgh Pirates
- Samuel Porter Jones (1847–1906), evangelist
- Cledus T. Judd, country music singer
- Wayne Knight (1955–), actor
- Robert Lavette, professional football player
- Trevor Lawrence, quarterback at Cartersville High School (2014–2018), Clemson University (2018–2020) and the Jacksonville Jaguars
- Lottie Moon, Baptist missionary to China
- Chloë Grace Moretz, actress and model
- Donavan Tate, third overall pick in the 2009 Major League Baseball draft by the San Diego Padres
- Mark Thompson, NASCAR driver
- Benjamin Walker, actor
- Butch Walker (1969–), singer-songwriter and producer
- Hedy West (1938–2005), folk singer and songwriter
- Rudy York (1913–1970), professional baseball player
