= Aberdeen, Georgia =

Aberdeen
- Neighborhood
- Aberdeen's position in Metro Atlanta
- Coordinates: 33°23′00″N 84°35′00″W
- Country: United States
- State: Georgia
- County: Fayette
- City: Peachtree City
  - Summer (DST): UTC−4 (EDT)
- ZIP code: 30269
- Area codes: 678, 770

Aberdeen is a neighborhood of Peachtree City, Georgia, United States. The community is centered at Flat Creek Road and Northlake Drive.

== History ==
A post office called Aberdeen was established in 1910, and remained in operation until 1929. The community's name is a transfer from Aberdeen, in Scotland. Aberdeen was incorporated from 1911 until 1995.
