= Mark Thompson (racing driver) =

American racing driver (born 1951)

- Born: July 9, 1951 (age 75) Cartersville, Georgia, U.S.

ARCA Racing Series career
- Debut season: 1991
- Crew chief: Don Hoffman
- Former teams: Henley Gray, Mike Brandt, Jack Bowsher, Billy Gerhart, Russ Roulo, Venturini Motorsports, Turner Scott Motorsports
- Starts: 93
- Wins: 2
- Poles: 4
- Best finish: 3rd in 1997
- Finished last season: 72nd (2015)

NASCAR Cup Series career
- 3 races run over 3 years
- 2018 position: 41st
- Best finish: 41st (2018)
- First race: 1992 Champion Spark Plug 500 (Pocono)
- Last race: 2018 Daytona 500 (Daytona)
| Wins | Top tens | Poles |
|---|---|---|
| 0 | 0 | 0 |

NASCAR O'Reilly Auto Parts Series career
- 4 races run over 3 years
- 2017 position: 62nd
- Best finish: 62nd (2017)
- First race: 2015 Winn-Dixie 300 (Talladega)
- Last race: 2017 Subway Firecracker 250 (Daytona)
| Wins | Top tens | Poles |
|---|---|---|
| 0 | 0 | 0 |
- Statistics up to date as of November 18, 2018.

Mark Thompson (born July 9, 1951) is an American former professional stock car racing driver, pilot, and businessman. He formerly competed part-time in the NASCAR Cup Series, driving the No. 66 Ford Fusion for MBM Motorsports, and part-time in the NASCAR Xfinity Series, driving the No. 13 car for MBM Motorsports. At age 66, Thompson is the oldest driver to compete in the Daytona 500.

== Military career and Phoenix Air ==
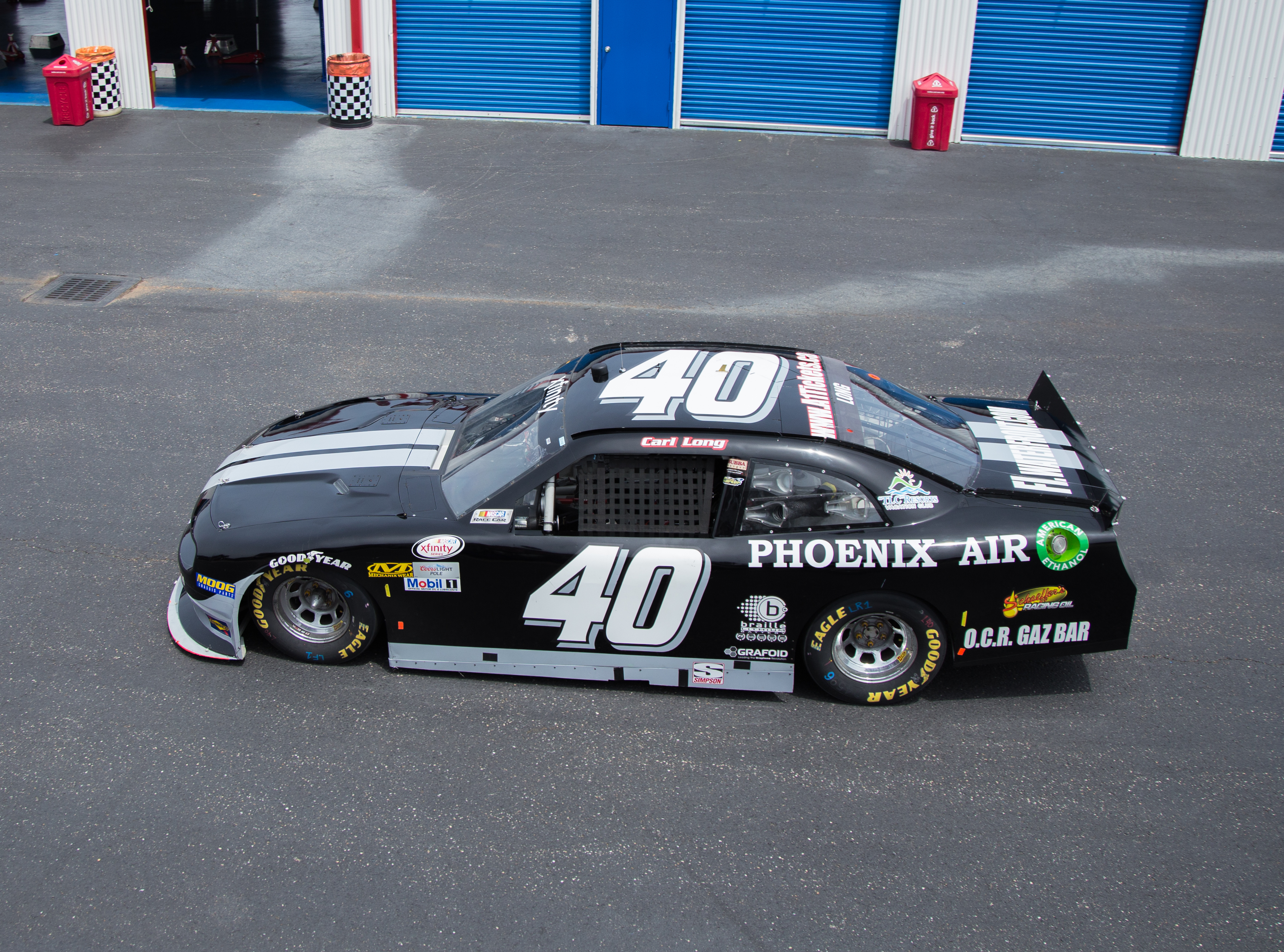
The Phoenix Air-sponsored No. 40 car, driven by Carl Long

Thompson started flying in 1969 as a Warrant Officer Candidate in the U.S. Army where he trained to fly helicopters. After an early release from the Army in 1972, he began teaching and transporting skydivers. Later in the decade, Thompson founded Phoenix Air as a parachuting school, which later evolved into an air transport company with ties to fifteen U.S. and foreign government agencies, carrying government workers who had been infected with diseases, including Americans who had contracted the Ebola virus disease from Liberia to the U.S. Phoenix Air also provides tactical electronic warfare training services to the U.S. Air Force, the Air National Guard and the U.S. Navy.

Phoenix Air formerly sponsored MBM Motorsports' Nos. 13 and 40 cars in the Xfinity Series. In 2016, Phoenix served as a primary sponsor for MBM drivers Thompson, Carl Long and Timmy Hill.

== Racing career ==
=== ARCA Racing Series ===
Thompson began racing in ARCA in 1991 where he ran seven races scoring one top-five at Talladega with a fourth place finish.

In ARCA's season opening race at Daytona on February 13, 1994, Thompson was racing in a single file pack when a car in front of Thompson in Michael Dokken lost control of his car off of turn 2 and spun. Dokken clipped Thompson in the right rear sending Thompson around and ended up tipping Thompson's car over on his roof. Thompson's car skidded on his roof until it reached the grass where his car began to go into a pair of violent sidewinder barrel rolls and flips. Thompson's car flipped seven times in the grass before it landed right side up with the car's body nearly torn apart. Thompson had suffered broken ribs and a concussion but survived. He was able to return in time for the next race on April 30 at Talladega finishing in third place.

In 1996, Thompson scored his first career ARCA Series pole at Michigan. He eventually scored another pole at the same track four races later. In 1997, Thompson would run his only full-time ARCA Series season. He scored his first career win at Charlotte in the fourth race of the year. Later that year, Thompson would score another win at the July Michigan race which would be his final in his ARCA Series career. Overall, Thompson scored two wins, ten top-fives, and sixteen top-tens with one pole at Michigan in June and finished third in the standings behind Frank Kimmel and Series champion Tim Steele, who won twelve races and clinching the championship early despite missing the final race at Atlanta.

During qualifying for the season-opening Lucas Oil 200 in 2015, Thompson became the oldest pole-sitter in Daytona International Speedway history after recording a lap speed of 187.336 miles per hour (301.488 km/h) for his first pole in 18 years.

On November 28, 2016, MBM Motorsports announced plans for Thompson to race at the 2017 season-opening Lucas Oil 200 ARCA Racing Series race at Daytona; the race was Thompson's final planned ARCA start, though he would also compete at Talladega later in the season. Driving the No. 66 Phoenix Air Ford, Thompson qualified fifteenth, but finished 31st after he was collected in a nine-car accident on lap 49. In 2018, he returned and raced in the Lucas Oil 200, though he was taken out in a violent late-race crash.

=== NASCAR ===
In 1993 and 1994, Thompson made three NASCAR Winston Cup Series attempts with Henley Gray, driving the No. 62 and No. 86, respectively. He failed to qualify in his first attempt at Darlington Raceway, but made the second race at Pocono Raceway after qualifying 38th. However, after eight laps, he retired from the race due to an engine failure, and finished 39th. In 1993, Thompson failed to qualify for the Pepsi 400 after not making an attempt. The next year, he joined Mike Brandt in the No. 66 Ford, but withdrew from the Daytona 500.

In 2015, Thompson made his Xfinity Series debut in the Winn-Dixie 300 at Talladega Superspeedway, driving the No. 13 for MBM Motorsports, and qualified 31st, while finishing 27th, two laps down.

In 2017, Thompson joined Premium Motorsports to drive the No. 15 Chevrolet for the Alabama 500 at Talladega, Thompson's first Cup event in 25 years.

In 2018, Thompson raced in the 2018 Daytona 500 becoming the oldest driver at 66 years of age to drive in the event. He finished 22nd in what would become his final race in any series.

== Personal life ==
Thompson's brother, Dent, was a writer at Walt Disney World until 1983, when he joined his brother at Phoenix Air; Dent currently works as Phoenix Air's COO.

Thompson holds an ATP license and has five type ratings.

== Motorsports career results ==
=== NASCAR ===
(key) (Bold – Pole position awarded by qualifying time. Italics – Pole position earned by points standings or practice time. * – Most laps led.)

==== Monster Energy Cup Series ====
Monster Energy NASCAR Cup Series results
| Year | Team | No. | Make | 1 | 2 | 3 | 4 | 5 | 6 | 7 | 8 | 9 | 10 | 11 | 12 | 13 | 14 | 15 | 16 | 17 | 18 | 19 | 20 | 21 | 22 | 23 | 24 | 25 | 26 | 27 | 28 | 29 | 30 | 31 | 32 | 33 | 34 | 35 | 36 | MENCC | Pts | Ref |
|---|---|---|---|---|---|---|---|---|---|---|---|---|---|---|---|---|---|---|---|---|---|---|---|---|---|---|---|---|---|---|---|---|---|---|---|---|---|---|---|---|---|---|
| 1992 | Gray Racing | 62 | Ford | DAY | CAR | RCH | ATL | DAR; DNQ | BRI | NWS | MAR | TAL | CLT | DOV | SON | POC; 39 | MCH | DAY | POC | TAL | GLN | MCH | BRI | DAR | RCH | DOV | MAR | NWS | CLT | CAR | PHO | ATL | | | | | | | | 90th | 46 | |
| 1993 | Gray Racing | 86 | Ford | DAY | CAR | RCH | ATL | DAR | BRI | NWS | MAR | TAL | SON | CLT | DOV | POC | MCH | DAY; DNQ | NHA | POC | TAL | GLN | MCH | BRI | DAR | RCH | DOV | MAR | NWS | CLT | CAR | PHO | ATL | | | | | | | NA | - | |
| 2017 | Premium Motorsports | 15 | Chevy | DAY | ATL | LVS | PHO | CAL | MAR | TEX | BRI | RCH | TAL | KAN | CLT | DOV | POC | MCH | SON | DAY | KEN | NHA | IND | POC | GLN | MCH | BRI | DAR | RCH | CHI | NHA | DOV | CLT | TAL; 39 | KAN | MAR | TEX | PHO | HOM | 66th | 0^{1} | |
| 2018 | MBM Motorsports | 66 | Ford | DAY; 22 | ATL | LVS | PHO | CAL | MAR | TEX | BRI | RCH | TAL | DOV | KAN | CLT | POC | MCH | SON | CHI | DAY | KEN | NHA | POC | GLN | MCH | BRI | DAR | IND | LVS | RCH | CLT | DOV | TAL | KAN | MAR | TEX | PHO | HOM | 41st | 15 | |

===== Daytona 500 =====
| Year | Team | Manufacturer | Start | Finish |
|---|---|---|---|---|
| 2018 | MBM Motorsports | Ford | 40 | 22 |

==== Xfinity Series ====
NASCAR Xfinity Series results
| Year | Team | No. | Make | 1 | 2 | 3 | 4 | 5 | 6 | 7 | 8 | 9 | 10 | 11 | 12 | 13 | 14 | 15 | 16 | 17 | 18 | 19 | 20 | 21 | 22 | 23 | 24 | 25 | 26 | 27 | 28 | 29 | 30 | 31 | 32 | 33 | NXSC | Pts | Ref |
|---|---|---|---|---|---|---|---|---|---|---|---|---|---|---|---|---|---|---|---|---|---|---|---|---|---|---|---|---|---|---|---|---|---|---|---|---|---|---|---|
| 2015 | MBM Motorsports | 13 | Dodge | DAY | ATL | LVS | PHO | CAL | TEX | BRI | RCH | TAL; 27 | IOW | CLT | DOV | MCH | CHI | DAY; DNQ | KEN | NHA | IND | IOW | GLN | MOH | BRI | ROA | DAR | RCH | CHI | KEN | DOV | CLT | KAN | TEX | PHO | HOM | 73rd | 17 | |
| 2016 | MBM Motorsports | 13 | Toyota | DAY; DNQ | ATL | LVS | PHO | CAL | TEX | BRI | RCH | TAL | DOV | CLT | POC | MCH | IOW | DAY; 31 | KEN | NHA | IND | IOW | GLN | MOH | BRI | ROA | DAR | RCH | CHI | KEN; QL^{†} | DOV | CLT | KAN | TEX | PHO | HOM | 74th | 11 | |
| 2017 | MBM Motorsports | 13 | Toyota | DAY; DNQ | ATL | LVS | PHO | CAL | TEX | BRI | RCH | TAL; 28 | CLT | DOV | POC | MCH | IOW | DAY; 29 | KEN | NHA | IND | IOW | GLN | MOH | BRI | ROA | DAR | RCH | CHI | KEN | DOV | CLT | KAN | TEX | PHO | HOM | 62nd | 17 | |
^{†} – Qualified but replaced by Timmy Hill.

^{*} Season still in progress
^{1} Ineligible for series points

=== ARCA Racing Series ===
(key) (Bold – Pole position awarded by qualifying time. Italics – Pole position earned by points standings or practice time. * – Most laps led.)

ARCA Racing Series results
| Year | Team | No. | Make | 1 | 2 | 3 | 4 | 5 | 6 | 7 | 8 | 9 | 10 | 11 | 12 | 13 | 14 | 15 | 16 | 17 | 18 | 19 | 20 | 21 | 22 | 23 | 24 | 25 | ARSC | Pts | Ref |
|---|---|---|---|---|---|---|---|---|---|---|---|---|---|---|---|---|---|---|---|---|---|---|---|---|---|---|---|---|---|---|---|
| 1991 | Gray Racing | 79 | Chevy | DAY; 25 | ATL; 14 | KIL | TAL; 12 | TOL | FRS | POC | MCH | KIL | FRS | DEL | POC | | | | | | | | | | | | | | 29th | 915 | |
| 1991 | Gray Racing | 62 | Olds | | | | | | | | | | | | | TAL; 4 | HPT; 32 | MCH; 27 | ISF | TOL | DSF | TWS | ATL; 34 | | | | | | 29th | 915 | |
| 1992 | Gray Racing | 62 | Pontiac | DAY; 11 | FIF; 8 | | | | | | | | | NSH; 6 | DEL | POC | HPT | FRS | ISF | TOL | DSF | | | | | | | | 24th | 1395 | |
| 1992 | Gray Racing | 62 | Olds | | | TWS; 27 | TAL | TOL | KIL | POC; 16 | MCH; 9 | FRS | KIL | | | | | | | | | TWS; 35 | SLM | ATL | | | | | 24th | 1395 | |
| 1993 | Mike Brandt | 66 | Ford | DAY; 40 | | TWS; 15 | TAL; 5 | | | | | POC; 12 | MCH; 21 | FRS | POC; 8 | KIL | | | | | | ATL; 6 | | | | | | | 20th | 1560 | |
| 1993 | Mike Brandt | 66 | Olds | | FIF; 2 | | | KIL; DNQ | CMS | FRS | TOL | | | | | | ISF; 40 | DSF | TOL | SLM; 15 | WIN; 32 | | | | | | | | 20th | 1560 | |
| 1994 | Mike Brandt | 66 | Ford | DAY; 34 | TAL; 3 | FIF | LVL | KIL | TOL | FRS | MCH; 10 | | | POC; 10 | KIL | FRS | INF | I70 | | | | | | ATL; 18 | | | | | 25th | 1240 | |
| 1994 | Mike Brandt | 0 | Olds | | | | | | | | | DMS; 34 | POC | | | | | | | | | | | | | | | | 25th | 1240 | |
| 1994 | Mike Brandt | 66 | Buick | | | | | | | | | | | | | | | | ISF; 18 | DSF | TOL | SLM | WIN | | | | | | 25th | 1240 | |
| 1995 | Mike Brandt | 66 | Ford | DAY; 36 | ATL; 6 | TAL; 23 | FIF | KIL | FRS | | | | | POC; 4 | POC; 6 | KIL | FRS | SBS | LVL | ISF | DSF | SLM | WIN | ATL; 21 | | | | | 26th | 1300 | |
| 1995 | Mike Brandt | 99 | Ford | | | | | | | MCH; 31 | I80 | MCS | FRS | | | | | | | | | | | | | | | | 26th | 1300 | |
| 1996 | Mike Brandt | 66 | Ford | DAY; 9 | ATL; 6 | SLM | TAL; 2 | FIF; 8 | LVL | CLT; 37 | CLT; 30 | KIL | FRS | POC; 20 | **MCH**; 3 | FRS | TOL | POC; 5 | **MCH**; 2 | INF | SBS | ISF | DSF | KIL | SLM | WIN | CLT; 2 | ATL; 2 | 12th | 2320 | |
| 1997 | Mike Brandt | 66 | Ford | DAY; 36 | ATL; 2 | | CLT; 1 | CLT; 4 | POC; 21 | **MCH**; 3* | SBS; 7 | TOL; 4 | KIL; 8 | FRS; 6 | MIN; 9 | POC; 6 | MCH; 1 | DSF; 5 | GTW; 33 | SLM; 4 | WIN; 17 | CLT; 25 | TAL; 2* | ISF; 14 | ATL; 6 | | | | 3rd | 5230 | |
| 1997 | Mike Brandt | 86 | Ford | | | SLM; 4 | | | | | | | | | | | | | | | | | | | | | | | 3rd | 5230 | |
| 1998 | Mike Brandt | 66 | Ford | DAY; 4 | ATL; 32 | SLM | CLT | MEM | MCH | POC | SBS | TOL | PPR | POC | KIL | FRS | ISF | ATL | DSF | SLM | TEX | WIN | CLT | TAL; 4 | ATL | | | | NA | 0 | |
| 2000 | Bowsher Motorsports | 21 | Ford | DAY | SLM | AND | CLT | KIL | FRS | MCH | POC | TOL | KEN | BLN | POC | WIN | ISF | KEN | DSF | SLM | CLT | TAL; 26 | ATL | | | | | | 116th | 115 | |
| 2003 | Mark Thompson | 48 | Ford | DAY | ATL | NSH | SLM | TOL | KEN | CLT | BLN | KAN | MCH | LER | POC | POC | NSH | ISF | WIN | DSF | CHI | SLM | TAL; 6 | CLT | SBO | | | | 122nd | 200 | |
| 2007 | Gerhart Racing | 5 | Chevy | DAY | USA | NSH | SLM | KAN | WIN | KEN | TOL | IOW | POC | MCH | BLN | KEN | POC | NSH | ISF | MIL | GTW | DSF | CHI | SLM | TAL; 28 | TOL | | | 152nd | 90 | |
| 2008 | Roulo Brothers Racing | 39 | Ford | DAY | SLM | IOW | KAN | CAR | KEN | TOL | POC | MCH | CAY | KEN | BLN | POC | NSH | ISF | DSF | CHI | SLM | NJE | TAL; 8 | TOL | | | | | 97th | 190 | |
| 2009 | Venturini Motorsports | 25 | Toyota | DAY | SLM | CAR | TAL; 25 | KEN | TOL | POC | MCH | MFD | IOW | KEN | BLN | POC | ISF | CHI | TOL | DSF | NJE | SLM | KAN | CAR | | | | | 137th | 105 | |
| 2010 | Venturini Motorsports | 66 | Toyota | DAY; 2 | PBE | SLM | TEX | TAL; 25 | TOL | POC | MCH | IOW | MFD | POC | BLN | NJE | ISF | CHI | DSF | TOL | SLM | KAN | CAR | | | | | | 67th | 325 | |
| 2011 | Venturini Motorsports | 66 | Toyota | DAY; 17 | TAL | SLM | TOL | NJE | | | | | | | | | | | | | | | | | | | | | 105th | 170 | |
| 2011 | Venturini Motorsports | 66 | Chevy | | | | | | CHI; 34 | POC | MCH | WIN | BLN | IOW | IRP | POC | ISF | MAD | DSF | SLM | KAN | TOL | | | | | | | 105th | 170 | |
| 2012 | Venturini Motorsports | 66 | Toyota | DAY; 5 | MOB | SLM | TAL; 14 | TOL | ELK | POC | MCH | WIN | NJE | IOW | CHI; 24 | IRP | POC | BLN | ISF | MAD | SLM | DSF | KAN | | | | | | 43rd | 475 | |
| 2013 | Turner Scott Motorsports | 62 | Chevy | DAY; 8 | MOB | SLM | | | | | | | | | | | | | | | | | | | | | | | 35th | 810 | |
| 2013 | Turner Scott Motorsports | 66 | Chevy | | | | TAL; 4 | TOL | ELK | POC | MCH | ROA | WIN | CHI | NJE | POC | BLN | ISF | MAD | DSF | IOW | SLM | KEN | KAN; 14 | | | | | 35th | 810 | |
| 2014 | Venturini Motorsports | 66 | Toyota | DAY; 37 | MOB | SLM | | | | | | | | | | | | | | | | | | | | | | | 81st | 200 | |
| 2014 | Turner Scott Motorsports | 4 | Chevy | | | | TAL; 15 | TOL | NJE | POC | MCH | ELK | WIN | CHI | IRP | POC | BLN | ISF | MAD | DSF | SLM | KEN | KAN | | | | | | 81st | 200 | |
| 2015 | Ken Schrader Racing | 11 | Toyota | **DAY**; 14 | MOB | NSH | SLM | | | | | | | | | | | | | | | | | | | | | | 72nd | 330 | |
| 2015 | Ken Schrader Racing | 66 | Toyota | | | | | TAL; 13 | TOL | NJE | POC | MCH | CHI | WIN | IOW | IRP | POC | BLN | ISF | DSF | SLM | KEN | KAN | | | | | | 72nd | 330 | |
| 2016 | Venturini Motorsports | 66 | Toyota | DAY; 33 | NSH | SLM | TAL; 19 | TOL | NJE | POC | MCH | MAD | WIN | IOW | IRP | POC | BLN | ISF | DSF | SLM | CHI | | | | | | | | 66th | 370 | |
| 2016 | MBM Motorsports | 66 | Toyota | | | | | | | | | | | | | | | | | | | KEN; 10 | KAN | | | | | | 66th | 370 | |
| 2017 | MBM Motorsports | 66 | Ford | DAY; 31 | NSH | SLM | TAL; 31 | TOL | ELK | POC | MCH | MAD | IOW | IRP | POC | WIN | ISF | ROA | DSF | SLM | CHI | KEN | KAN | | | | | | 98th | 145 | |
| 2018 | MBM Motorsports | 66 | Ford | DAY; 27 | NSH | SLM | TAL | TOL | CLT | POC | MCH | MAD | GTW | CHI | IOW | ELK | POC | ISF | BLN | DSF | SLM | IRP | KAN | | | | | | 101st | 95 | |
