= Cartersville Airport =

Airport in Georgia, United States

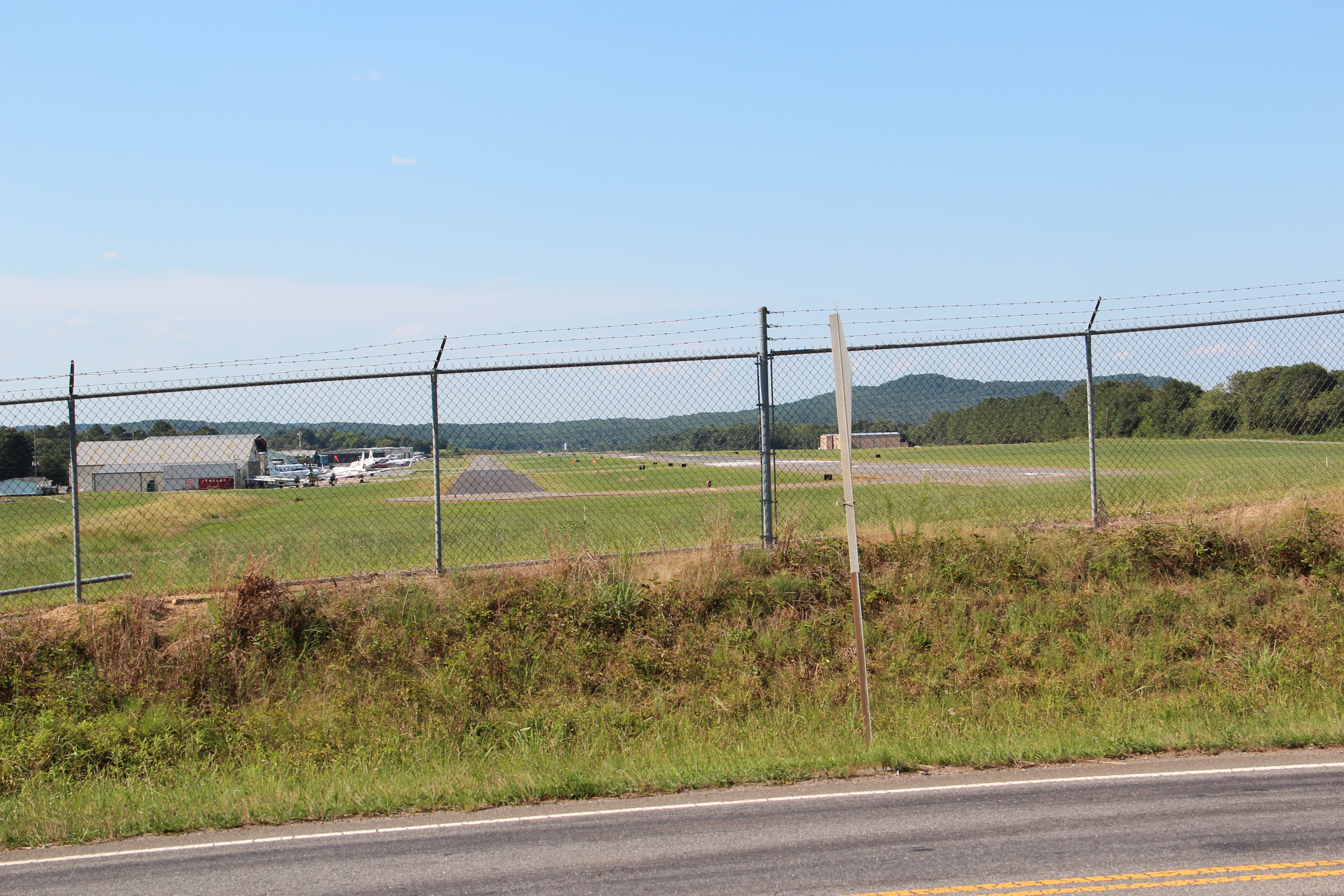
- IATA: none; ICAO: KVPC; FAA LID: VPC

Summary
- Airport type: Public
- Owner: Cartersville Bartow Airport Authority
- Serves: Cartersville, Georgia
- Elevation AMSL: 759 ft (231 m)
- Coordinates: 34°07′23″N 084°50′55″W
- Website: CartersvilleAirport.com
- Interactive map of Cartersville Airport

Runways
Direction	Length		Surface
Direction	ft	m	Surface
1/19	5,760	1,756	Asphalt

Statistics (2022)
- Aircraft operations: 50,500
- Based aircraft: 68
- Source: Federal Aviation Administration

Cartersville Airport (ICAO: KVPC, FAA LID: VPC), Valley of Pumpkinvine Creek Field, is a public use airport located on a small hill by the Etowah River two nautical miles (4km) west of the headwaters of Pumpkinvine Creek and three nautical miles (6 km) southwest of the central business district of Cartersville, in Bartow County, Georgia, United States. It is owned by the Cartersville Bartow Airport Authority.

Although many U.S. airports use the same three-letter location identifier for the FAA and IATA, this facility is assigned VPC by the FAA but has no designation from the IATA.

== Facilities and aircraft ==
Cartersville Airport covers an area of 185 acres (75 ha) at an elevation of 759 feet (231 m) above mean sea level. It has one runway designated 1/19 with an asphalt surface measuring 5,760 by 100 feet (1,756 x 30 m).

For the 12-month period ending December 31, 2022, the airport had 50,500 aircraft operations, an average of 138 per day: 90% general aviation, 10% air taxi, and 1% military. At that time there were 68 aircraft based at this airport: 41 single-engine, 5 multi-engine, 21 jet, and 1 helicopter.

== See also ==
- List of airports in Georgia (U.S. state)
