= George Knight =

George Knight may refer to:

== Sportsmen ==
- George T. Knight (cricketer) (1795–1867), English amateur cricketer
- George Knight (cricketer, born 1835) (1835–1901), English cricketer
- George Knight (baseball) (1855–1912), baseball player
- George Knight (Australian footballer) (1887–1947), Australian footballer for Melbourne
- George Knight (footballer, born 1921) (1921–2011), English professional footballer
- George Knight (American football) (born 1898), American football player

== Theologians ==
- George T. Knight (Universalist) (1850–1911), American theologian
- George R. Knight (born 1941), Seventh-day Adventist Church historian
- George W. Knight III (1931–2021), theologian and professor of New Testament at Greenville Presbyterian Theological Seminary
- G. A. Frank Knight (1869–1937), Scottish theologian

== Others ==
- George Knight (EastEnders), a fictional character
- George Wilfrid Holford Knight (1877–1936), British politician, MP for Nottingham South
- George Robert Knight (1879–1961), Australian rose breeder
- George Walton Knight (1823–1869), American scholar, educator and lawyer
- G. Wilson Knight (1897–1985), English literary critic
