= Charles Bird =

Charles Bird may refer to:

- Charlie Bird (1949–2024), Irish journalist and broadcaster
- Charles Smith Bird (1795–1862), English academic, cleric and theological writer
- Charles Warren Bird (1919–2009), Canadian veteran
- Charles Sumner Bird (1855–1927), American politician from Massachusetts

== See also ==
- Charles Byrd (disambiguation)
