= Captain Rogers =

Captain Rogers may refer to:

- Captain Woodes Rogers, an English sea captain, privateer, and the first Royal Governor of the Bahamas
- Captain William C. Rogers III, a former officer in the United States Navy
- Captain Robert Rogers (soldier), an American frontiersman given the rank of Captain during the French and Indian War whilst commanding a force of colonial Rangers
- Captain Moses Rogers, captain of the SS Savannah during her historic crossing of the Atlantic Ocean in 1819
- Captain W.G. Rogers, captain of the SS John B. Cowle when she sank in 1909
- Captain Charles Warrington Rogers, namesake for Rogers, Arkansas

== Fictional characters ==
- Captain Steve Rogers, AKA Captain America a Marvel Comics superhero
- Captain Buck Rogers, a science fiction character in magazines and other serials
- "Captain Rogers", a short story in W. W. Jacobs' work, The Lady of the Barge
