= Barnsley Gardens =

Human settlement in Georgia, USA

Barnsley Resort
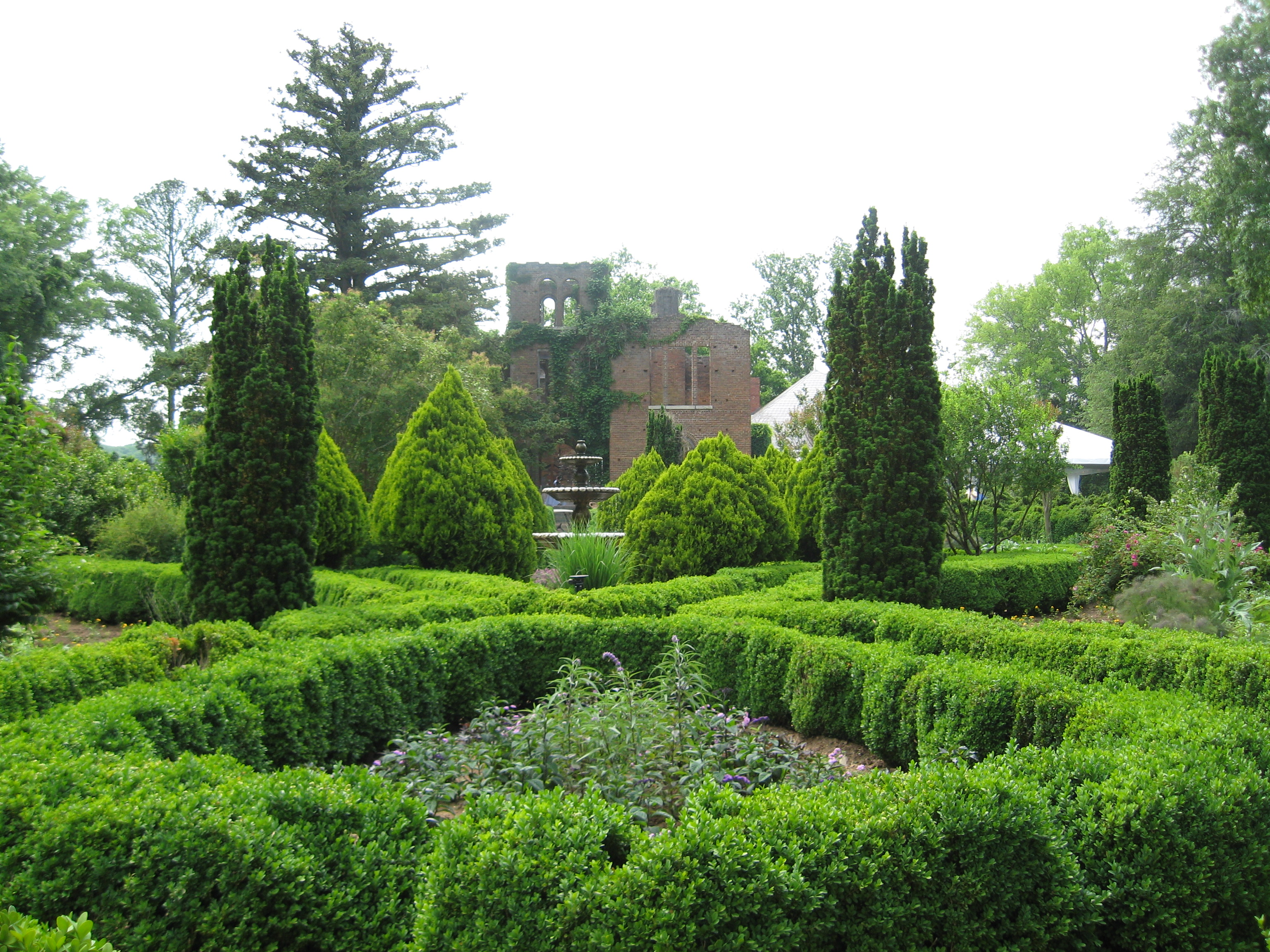
- Mansion ruins and gardens

- Location within Georgia
- 34.29853°N 84.98762°W
- Location: Bartow County, near Adairsville, Georgia

History
- Built: 1840s
- Built for: Godfrey Barnsley

Site notes
- Architectural style: Italianate
- Governing body: Private

Barnsley Resort is situated on the grounds of a historic former manor house near Adairsville, Georgia, United States. Originally known as Woodlands (later known as Barnsley Gardens), the estate was established by Godfrey Barnsley, originally of Liverpool, England. He built the Italianate manor in the late 1840s.

== History ==
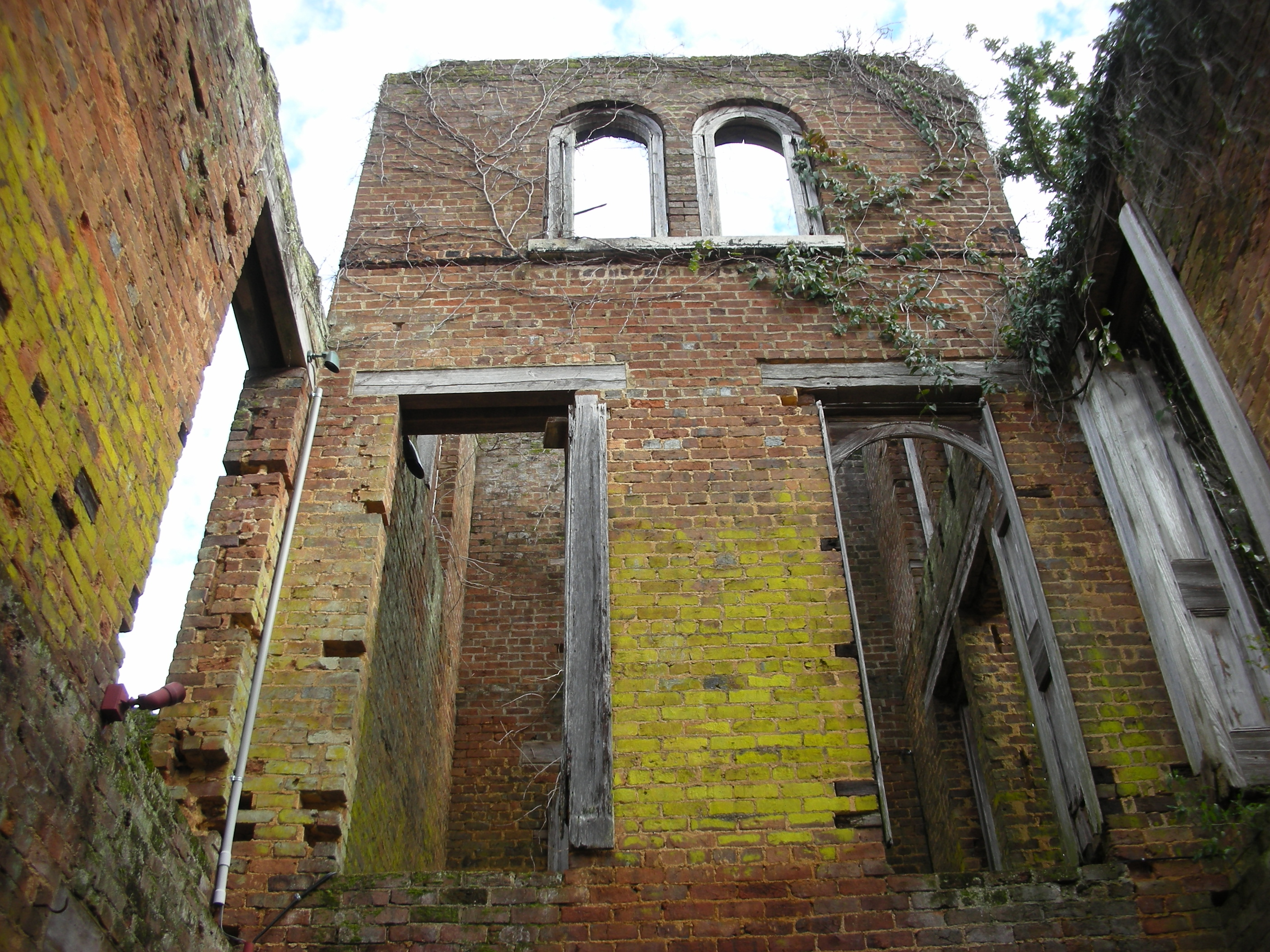
Close-up of the ruins

Barnsley acquired 10,000 acres (4,000 ha) of land from the state of Georgia after acquiring it from the Cherokee nation. The land was then divided into 160-acre plots. The original manor at Barnsley Resort was built for Godfrey's wife Julia, surrounded by rare trees and shrubs from afar afield as Norway. Before the mansion was completed, Julia fell ill and died, and Barnsley suspended its construction. Later, he said he felt her presence at the site telling him to finish the house for him and his children. The mansion was built in the style of an Italian villa by the landscape architect Andrew Jackson Downing. Barnsley lost his fortune during the Civil War (during which the home was burned as part of the Sherman's March to the Sea) and later moved to New Orleans before he died in 1873.

Barnsley's descendants continued to live at Woodlands until the roof of the main house was blown off by a tornado in 1906. Barnsley's granddaughter, Adelaide Saylor, and her family who were living there at the time, moved into the kitchen wing and the main house was never restored, and eventually fell to ruins. In 1988 Prince Hubertus Fugger purchased the estate and began a major project to stabilize the ruins and rescue and restore the gardens. The original boxwood hedges planted in the early 1840s still survived and had grown up into a thicket of small trees and vines. These were carefully cut back over a number of years to reveal the interweaving paths and flower beds of the original parterre garden. This is now one of the few surviving antebellum gardens of the southern United States.

=== Mansion ===
The mansion was divided into three sections, with the central part being two stories and topped by a tower, below which marble steps led up the main entrance. Flanking the hallway were spacious drawing rooms and libraries. The right wing also contained a banquet hall (featuring a mahogany dining table large enough to seat 40 people) and billiard and smoking rooms, below which, in the cellar, was the kitchen, store rooms and cellar. (The dining table and sideboard were made for Pedro I of Brazil, while a gilt clock in the library was once the property of Marie Antoinette.) The left wing housed temporary living quarters for the home's construction workers while it was being completed. The second floor contained sixteen bedrooms. At the rear was a terrace. At the time of Lucian Lamar Knight's visit, around 1913, for his book Georgia's Landmarks, Memorials and Legends, the grave of Colonel Richard G. Earle, was located over the brow of a hill behind the mansion. Earle was killed on May 17, 1864, during the Civil War while warning Barnsley of Sherman's approach. His grave was later moved to the gardens of the mansion's ruins.

At the foot of the slope stood an ivy-covered spring-house, described by Knight as being "one of the prettiest spots in which the imagination could possibly revel." Inside it, the spring bubbled up and made its way over the terrain until it became a sizable stream.

A cyclone tore the roof off the mansion around the turn of the 20th century, which—along with vandalism―led to the building's ruinous state.
