= Charles Byrd =

Charles or Charlie Byrd or Bird may refer to:

- Charlie Byrd (1925–1999), American jazz guitarist
- Charlie Bird (born 1949), Irish journalist
- Charlie "Bird" Parker (1920–55), American jazz saxophonist
- Charles Willing Byrd (1770–1828), early Ohio political leader and jurist
- Charles Smith Bird (1795–1862), English academic, cleric and tutor
- Charles Byrd (fighter) (born 1983), American mixed martial artist
- Charles Pinckney Byrd, printer in Atlanta, Georgia

== See also ==
- Charlie Baird (born 1955), Texas criminal defense attorney and judge
- Charles Bird King (1785–1862), American portrait artist
