= Charlotte Taylor =

Charlotte Taylor may refer to:

- Charlotte De Bernier Taylor (1806–1861), American entomologist
- Charlotte M. Taylor (born 1955), botanist and professor
- Charlotte Booth (rower) née Taylor (born 1985), English rower
- Charlotte Taylor (runner) (born 1994), British long-distance runner
- Charlotte Taylor (cricketer) (born 1994), English cricketer
