= William Scarbrough House =

Historic house in Savannah, Georgia, US

- U.S. National Register of Historic Places
- U.S. National Historic Landmark
- U.S. National Historic Landmark District – Contributing property
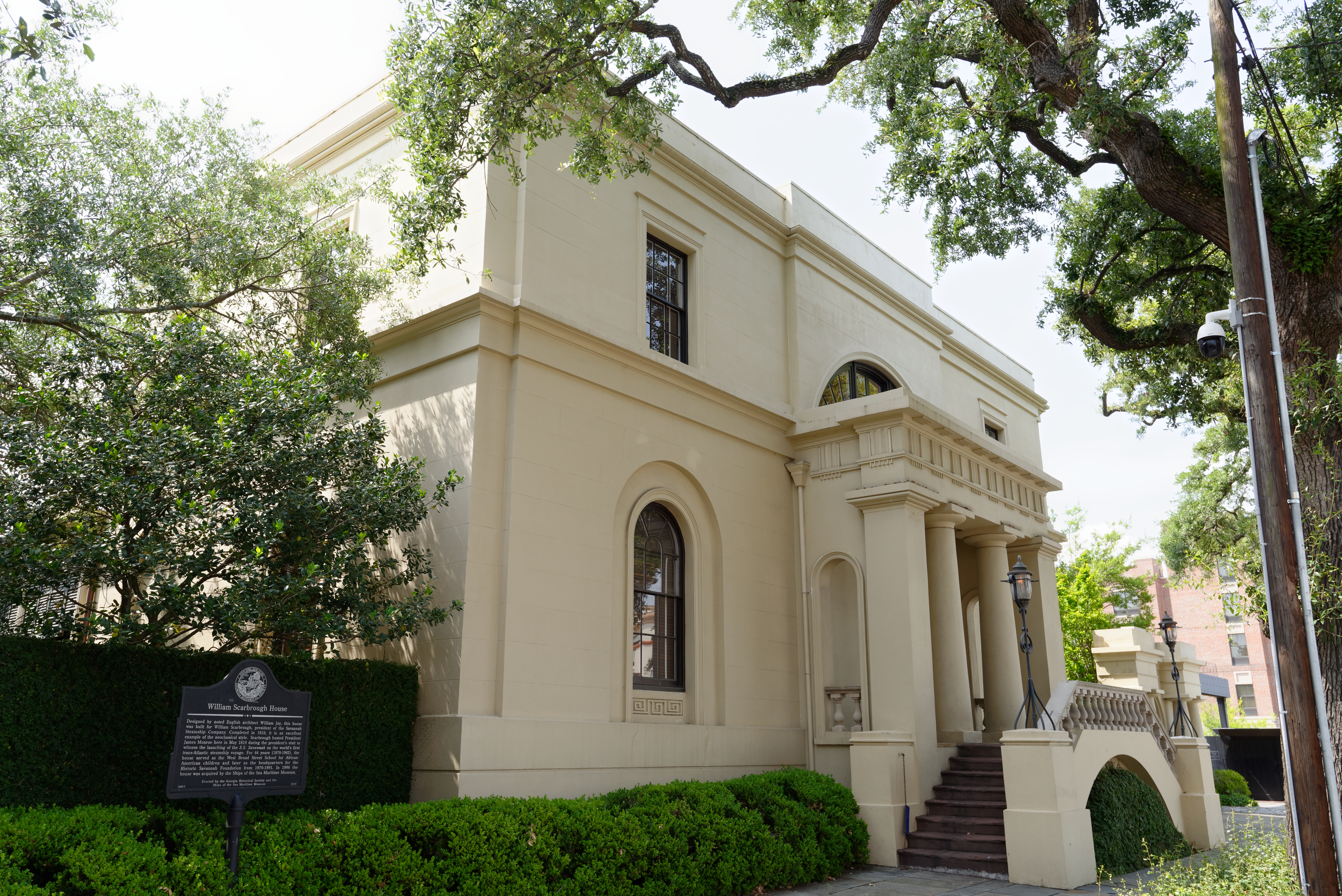
- The house in 2020

- Location within Georgia Location within the United States
- Location: 41 Martin Luther King, Jr. Blvd, Savannah, Georgia
- Coordinates: 32.08117°N 81.09727°W
- Built: 1819 (207 years ago)
- Architect: William Jay
- Architectural style: Early Republic
- Part of: Savannah Historic District (Savannah, Georgia) (ID66000277)
- NRHP reference No.: 70000201

Significant dates
- Added to NRHP: June 22, 1970
- Designated NHL: November 7, 1973

William Scarbrough House is a historic house in Savannah, Georgia. Built in 1819, and subjected to a number later alterations, it is nationally significant as an early example of Greek Revival architecture, and is one of the few surviving American works of architect William Jay. The house was declared a National Historic Landmark in 1973. It is now home to the Ships of the Sea Maritime Museum, and it has largely been restored to an early 19th-century appearance.

The house was built for William Scarbrough, one of the principal owners of the SS Savannah, which in 1819 became the first steamship to cross the Atlantic Ocean.

== Architecture ==
The Scarbrough House is located on the west side of central Savannah, on the west side of Martin Luther King, Jr., Boulevard, between Orange Street and West Bryant Street. It is now set close to the street, its original front yard having been lost due to widening of the road. It is a two-story masonry structure, with walls of brick that has been stuccoed and scored to resemble stone blocks. The building is set on a raised basement, and had a low-pitch hip roof over its front section, and another similar roof over the rear section, which housed the ballroom. The roof is obscured by the presence of a low parapet. The entrance consists of a raised platform, accessed by stairs at the sides, above which is a tall single-story portico, supported by four smooth Doric columns. The portico's entablature is continued around the building as a string course. Above the portico is a large semi-round opening with a pair of French doors at the center, providing access to the balcony atop the portico. The interior spaces of the building retain rehabilitated (and in some cases reconstructed) decorative elements from the period of initial construction.

== History ==
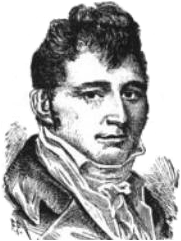
William Scarbrough (1776–1838)

The house was built in 1819 for William Scarbrough, a prominent and successful Savannah merchant and shipowner. It was designed by William Jay, an Englishman who settled in Savannah in 1817, and is credited with a number of high-profile designs in the city, of which this is one of three that survive. The house underwent a number of alterations, including the addition (and later removal during restoration) of a third floor, and was from 1873 to 1962 owned by the city, which housed the West Broad Street Colored School here. The house was then acquired by the Historic Savannah Foundation, which modernized its systems and undertook some restorative steps. The house was turned over to the Telfair Museums in 1990, and in the early 1990s it underwent further rehabilitation and adaptation for use as a museum. In 1994 it was turned over to the Ships of the Sea Maritime Museum.

The Scarbroughs hosted James Monroe, the sitting fifth United States president, in 1819.

== Ships of the Sea Maritime Museum ==
The Ships of the Sea Maritime Museum, founded in 1966, features nine galleries of ship models, maritime paintings and artifacts that reflect Savannah's maritime heritage. Ship models include the SS Savannah (a ship owned by William Scarbrough), HMS Anne, the ship that carried James Oglethorpe and the first settlers of Georgia in 1732, The Wanderer, a ship that brought slaves from Africa to the United States in 1858, and RMS Titanic.

The museum also features 2 acres (0.81 ha) of gardens derived from a typical 19th-century parlor garden design. In 1974, Savannah Landscape Architect Clermont Huger Lee prepared plans for the Waring Memorial Garden, tenant courtyards and off-street parking area.

== See also ==
- List of National Historic Landmarks in Georgia (U.S. state)
- National Register of Historic Places listings in Chatham County, Georgia
