= C. P. Byrd =

Printing company owner in Atlanta, Georgia

Charles Pinckney Byrd (c. 1857 – November 1935) was a printing company proprietor in Atlanta, Georgia. He established his printing company in 1897. The business was a partnership for a time known as Byrd & Pattillo. Byrd incorporated Byrd Publishing Company and later, seeking to do textbook business, reincorporated as Byrd Printing Company.

Georgia Day program (1910)

He was a native of Cuthbert, Georgia. He married twice, first to Pearl Bryan in 1880 whom he divorced in 1894, then to Cora Lyon in 1896. He lived at 109 East North Avenue.

== History ==
C. P. Byrd operated the Byrd Publishing Company in Atlanta, Georgia. From about 1909 - 1915, C. P. Byrd was State Printer. In 1927, The Byrd Publishing Company, C. P. Byrd president, advertised school and college textbooks and "literary productions of all kinds" on its letterhead. Its office was at 506-507 Norris Building. It was on Peachtree Street.

Byrd published proceedings from encampments of the Grand Army of the Republic.

In 1916 Byrd sued for an injunction against another printing company that was awarded the state printing job. He alleged that state officials were stockholders and that the company did not meet the criteria for state printer.

Byrd married Pearl Bryan, daughter of Mary E. Bryan, in 1880. Mary stayed with him and launched The Old Homestead publication until she became afflicted with typhoid and moved to Florida for relief. He took over the publication while she pledged to continue as a writer for it. Charles and Pearl divorced in 1894.

He was on the Executive Committee of the Georgia Printers' Association. He served as president when it was known as Typothetae.

He purchased several presses. For $250,000, he acquired property at Peachtree and Kimball streets for a 10-story hotel.

== Publications ==
- The Colonial Records of Georgia compiled by Allen D. Candler
- Black Heels on White Necks or A Fight for Supremacy, a text deriding Social Equality, castigating "Republican Supremacy", and pronouncing white supremacy. It defends lynching, calls out northern hypocrisy, calls out "scalawags" and "carpetbaggers" and defends Southern institutions including slavery. It was written anonymously by an author who identifies herself as female. The tome recounts outrages such as a white female postal employee being introduced to a "negro" hire. The signature of Ephie Augustus Williams appears in a copy of the book. He was a black Knight of Pythias leader.

Scraps of song and southern scenes; a collection of humorous and pathetic poems and descriptive sketches of plantation life in the backwoods of Georgia

- Byrd published the 26 volume Colonial Records of the State of Georgia.
- Scraps of song and southern scenes; a collection of humorous and pathetic poems and descriptive sketches of plantation life in the backwoods of Georgia by Montgomery M. Folsom (1889)
- A reverie of the early dawn by Elizabeth Fry (1893)
- Life in Dixie During the War by Mary Ann Harris Gay (1897)
- The Confederate Records of the State of Georgia (1909)
- Savannah Line steamship brochure (12 pages)
- Journal of the House of Representatives (1911)
- Second Report on the Roads of Georgia"s Geological Survey of Georgia
- Georgia's Landmarks, Memorials and Legends (1913; Lucian Lamar Knight)
