= Godfrey Barnsley =

British-American businessman (1805–1873)

- Born: August 26, 1805; Derbyshire, England
- Died: June 7, 1873 (aged 67)
- Occupation: Cotton broker
- Known for: Woodlands plantation
- Spouse: Julia Scarborough (m. 1828–1845; her death)

Godfrey Barnsley (August 26, 1805 – June 7, 1873) was a British-American businessman and cotton broker who became one of the wealthiest people in the southeastern United States.

== Early life ==
Barnsley was born in 1805 in Derbyshire, England. His father was George Barnsley, an English cotton mill owner, and his mother was Anna (Hannah) Goodwin Barnsley. He also had an older brother, Joshua. Barnsley began working in the cotton business at his uncle Godfrey Barnsley's importing establishment in Liverpool.

In 1824, Barnsley emigrated to the United States. At the age of eighteen, Barnsley settled in Savannah, Georgia. He arrived in Savannah with no money and no distinguished education; however, it was in Savannah that Barnsley made his fortune as a cotton broker and became one of the most affluent men in the American South through the cotton trade and shipping business. He also served as president of the Savannah Chamber of Commerce for several years.

While living in Savannah, Barnsley met Julia Henrietta Scarbrough, the daughter of William Scarbrough, a wealthy shipbuilder and merchant. On December 24, 1828, at the age of twenty-five, Barnsley married Julia, with whom he had eight children. In 1842, Julia's health began to decline and Barnsley decided to move his family to northern Georgia, where he believed there would be a more healthful climate for his wife. Barnsley traveled from Savannah to Cass County on an expedition with three friends, William Henry Stiles, Reverend Charles Wallace Howard and Francis S. Bartow. Stiles traveled to northern Georgia because he was looking for land for future development. Howard was on a geological survey. Barnsley sought to find land where he could build a home that would be away from the heat and threat of yellow fever and malaria prevalent of the Georgia coast where he lived. He chose a piece of land in the small village of Adairsville.

== Barnsley's mansion ==
On 10,000 acres (40 km^{2}), Barnsley began construction of his mansion for Julia. He called his manor Woodlands, which later became known as Barnsley Gardens. He designed the gardens of the estate in the style of Andrew Jackson Downing, who was considered "America's first great landscape architect." Barnsley also brought in every known variety of roses to be planted in the garden. The mansion had twenty-four rooms and was designed in the style of an Italian villa. It had mantels of black and white marble imported from Italy and also had "unheard of conveniences, such as hot and cold running water."

Barnsley had his house built on an acorn-shaped hill. An old Native American, who worked with Barnsley, warned him not to build on that piece of property. He explained that the site was sacred to the Cherokee and that anyone who tried to live on it would be cursed. Barnsley ignored the Indian's advice and started construction anyway.

== Tragedy ==
Barnsley was with his father-in-law in New York City when the latter died on June 11, 1838, aged 62.

Barnsley's own fortune soon changed after moving into his mansion. His infant son died and, in the summer of 1845, Julia died of tuberculosis. Widower Barnsley still continued to build the mansion after Julia's death because he felt her presence at the site. He toured Europe in search of "elegant furnishings" to decorate his estate. In 1850, Barnsley's oldest daughter, Anna, got married and moved to England. Adelaide, Barnsley's second daughter, died in the mansion in 1858.

== Civil War ==
When the American Civil War started, the cotton Barnsley brokered was no longer sellable and eventually rotted in warehouses in New Orleans. During the war, Barnsley moved back and forth from Woodlands to New Orleans. Two of Barnsley's sons, George and Lucien, joined the Confederacy, and in 1862, Howard, Barnsley's oldest son, was killed by Chinese pirates while searching in the Orient for "exotic shrubbery" to add to the mansion.

On May 18, 1864, Colonel Richard G. Earle, who was part of the Second Alabama Light Cavalry and a friend of Barnsley, rode to Barnsley's house to warn him that Sherman's troops were approaching. Earle was intercepted by Union forces and shot down within sight of the mansion. Earle's body was buried at Woodlands. When Union troops arrived at the site, Federal General James B. McPherson ordered his men not to destroy Barnsley's estate, but his orders were ignored. Italian statuary was smashed in hopes of finding hidden gold. Wine and food were stolen. What could not be stolen was smashed, including windows and China.

== Leaving Woodlands ==
By the end of the war, Barnsley moved to New Orleans to try to regain his lost fortune. He left Woodlands to be managed by James Peter Baltzelle, his son-in-law and a Confederate Army captain. Baltzelle made a living by shipping timber from Woodlands, but was killed by a falling tree in 1868. Soon after, daughter Julia joined her father in New Orleans, along with her daughter, Adelaide.

== Death ==
Barnsley died in New Orleans in 1873, aged 67, and was taken back to Woodlands, where he was buried. The Woodlands manor house was destroyed in 1906 by a tornado, but the ruins are now open to the public and are part of Barnsley Resort.

== Sources ==
1. Godfrey Barnsley Papers, Manuscript, Archives, and Rare Book Library, Emory University
2. , Barnsley Gardens, by Kathleen Walls
3. Godfrey Barnsley and Barnsley Gardens, Cartersville-Bartow County, GA Convention and Visitors Bureau,
4. , History and Overview, www.barnsley resort.com
5. Barnsley Gardens
