= Bella Jarrett =

American novelist

- Jarrett in 1982
- Born: February 9, 1926; Adairsville, Georgia, U.S.
- Died: October 19, 2007 (aged 81); Greenwich Village, New York City, U.S.
- Occupation: Actress

Bella Jarrett (February 9, 1926 – October 19, 2007) was an American stage, television, and film actress as well as a novelist. Her acting credits include Broadway, Off-Broadway, television series, and films.

== Early life ==
Bella Jarrett was born on February 9, 1926, in Adairsville, Georgia. As a child, she decided to learn the hand alphabet that is used by deaf people because she was curious. She attended Wesleyan College in Macon, Georgia, earning a B.A in 1947 and M.F.A. in 1948. After graduating, she acted in community theater and had an advertising job in Atlanta, Georgia. In 1951 she married M. O. Thornburg, an employee of Atlanta's WAGA radio station. In 1958, Jarrett moved to New York City to start an acting career. Upon moving, she first worked in store advertising and later became the public relations director for Abercrombie & Fitch. She quit her public relations job after a year and rented a flat so that she would be available for any auditions.

== Career ==
Jarrett began acting in the 1950s with local theater groups in Atlanta, Houston, Boston, and Washington D.C. She had roles in the television series All My Children, The Doctors, and Another World. Her Broadway debut was in the 1970s. She was in multiple Broadway productions which include Once in a Lifetime and Lolita. Jarrett also was in the Off-Broadway productions The Good Natur’d Man, Phaedra, and The Waltz of the Toreadors. The films that she had a role in are The Cotton Club, The Lonely Guy, and Hellfighters. Jarrett wrote four romance novels, two under the pen name Belle Thorne. Her first romance novel was published by Dell which was the second publisher that she contacted.

In a review of the controversial Catholic comedic play Sister Mary Ignatius Explains It All For You, Rita Rose of The Indianapolis Star wrote, "Bella Jarrett's theater credits could rival the length of any catechism handbook". Jarrett was part of the Bedside Network in which she read and performed for people who were chronically ill. She was also a member of Call for Action and Mensa International, the largest and oldest high IQ society in the world. She died on October 19, 2007, at her home in Greenwich Village.
