= William Scarbrough =

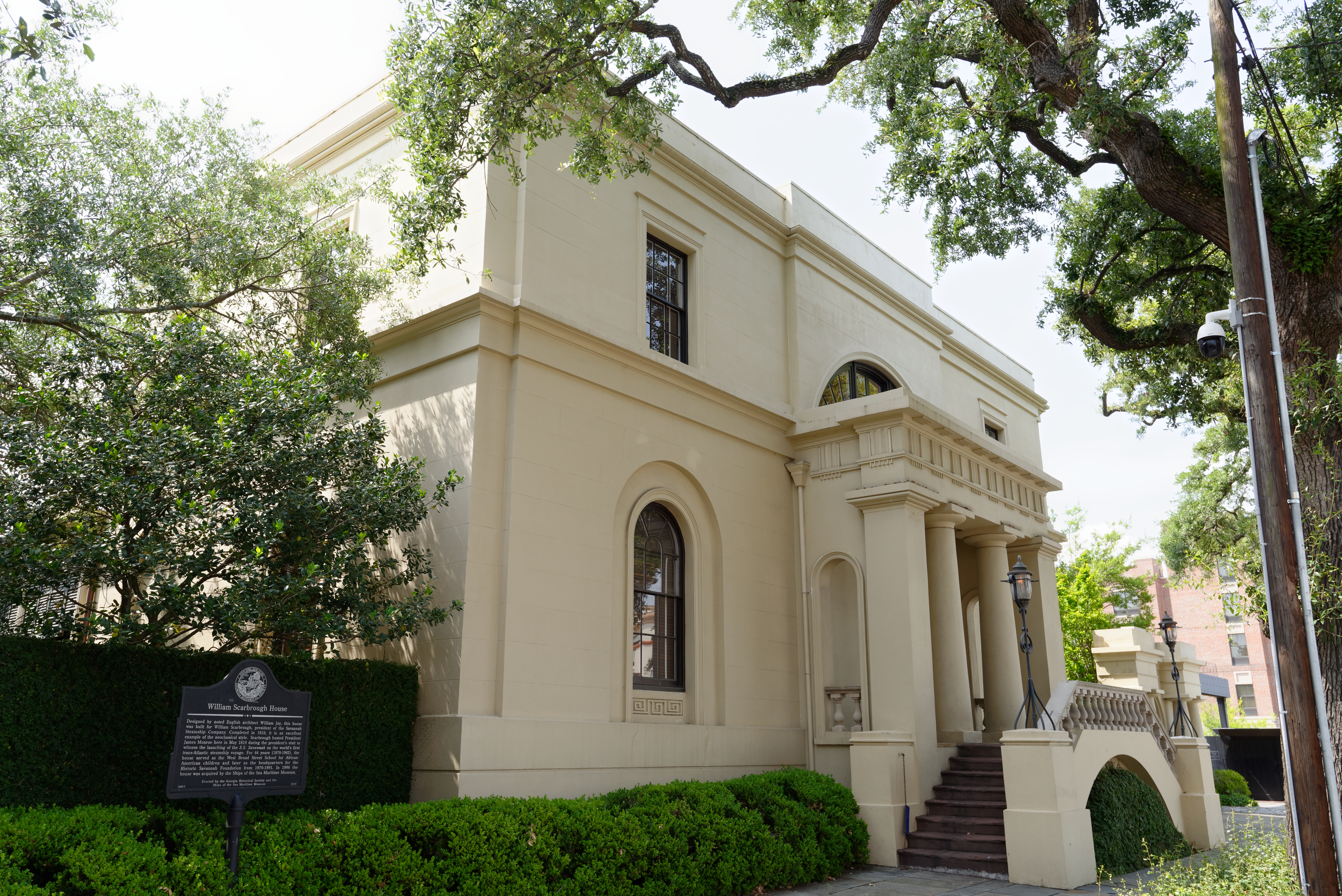
- The William Scarbrough House, Savannah, Georgia (2020)
- Born: February 18, 1776; Barnwell County, South Carolina
- Died: June 11, 1838 (aged 62); New York City, New York, U.S.
- Resting place: Colonial Park Cemetery, Savannah, Georgia, U.S.
- Occupation: Sea merchant
- Spouse: Julia Bernard (1805–1838; his death)

William Scarbrough (February 18, 1776 – June 11, 1838) was an American sea merchant. He was one of the principal owners of the SS Savannah, which in 1819 became the first steamship in the world to cross the Atlantic Ocean.

== Life and career ==
Scarbrough was born in Barnwell County, South Carolina, in 1776, the son of William Sr., a wealthy planter, and Lucy Sawyer.

He was educated at the University of Edinburgh, before moving to Savannah, Georgia, around 1798.

He became a bank director, an election manager, a member of the board of health, a vestryman at Savannah's Christ Church, was on the vice council of Denmark and Sweden, and was council general of Russia.

On April 18, 1805, he married Julia Bernard, with whom he had ten children: Charlotte deBernier, William, William G., Julia Henrietta, Lucy, Mary T., Joseph, Eliza, Emily and William Isaac. The couple hosted James Monroe, the sitting fifth United States president, in 1819.

In 1818, Scarbrough became president of the Savannah Steamship Company, which launched the SS Savannah the following year. It became the first steamship to cross the Atlantic Ocean.

Also in 1819, he had built what is today known as the William Scarbrough House on West Broad Street (today's Martin Luther King Jr. Boulevard).

The SS Savannah was not a success, and in November 1820, Scarbrough was in the midst of an "emotional and physical collapse". He was declared an insolvent debtor by the court, and his house and its furnishings were sold to a relative. The relative permitted Scarbrough and his family to remain in the home.

In the late 1820s and early 1830s, Scarbrough worked as an agent for the Upper Darien Steam Rice and Saw Mill in Darien, Georgia. He returned to Savannah in 1835.

== Death ==
Scarbrough died in 1838, while in New York City with his son-in-law, Godfrey Barnsley. He was 62. He was interred in a vault in Savannah's Colonial Park Cemetery along with his wife, who survived him by thirteen years.
