= Adairsville, Georgia =

- City
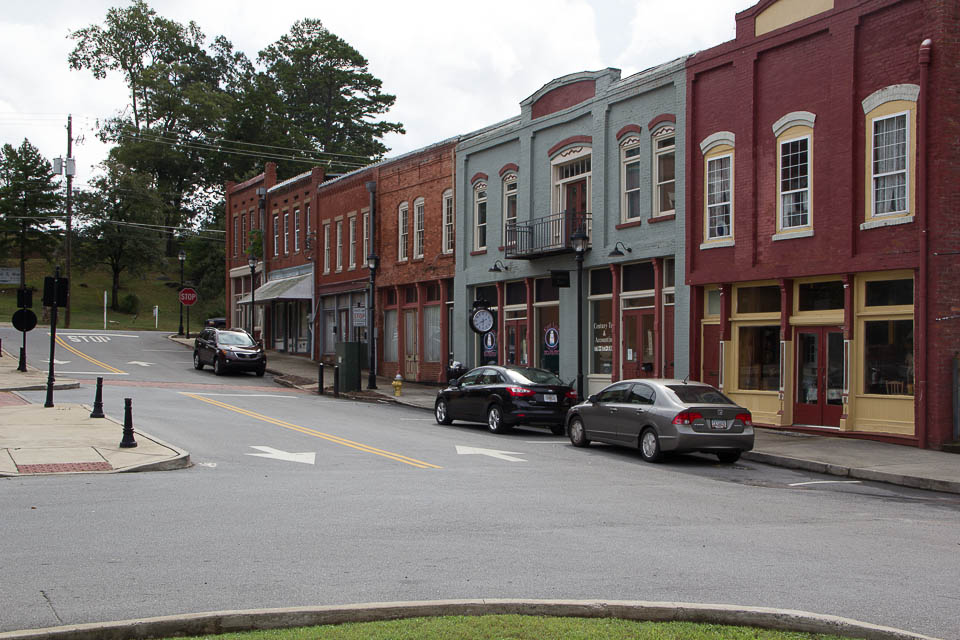
- Downtown Adairsville AKA The Square

- Flag Seal

- Location in Bartow County and the state of Georgia
- Coordinates: 34°22′8″N 84°55′42″W
- Country: United States
- State: Georgia
- County: Bartow

Government
  - Mayor: Kenneth Carson

Area
  - Total: 9.36 sq mi (24.24 km^{2})
  - Land: 9.36 sq mi (24.24 km^{2})
  - Water: 0 sq mi (0.00 km^{2})
- Elevation: 719 ft (219 m)

Population (2020)
  - Total: 4,878
  - Density: 521.3/sq mi (201.28/km^{2})
- Time zone: UTC−5 (Eastern (EST))
  - Summer (DST): UTC−4 (EDT)
- ZIP Code: 30103
- Area codes: 770; 678, 470, and 943
- FIPS code: 13-00436
- GNIS feature ID: 0310389
- Website: www.adairsvillega.net

Adairsville is a city in Bartow County, Georgia, United States. As of the 2020 census, the city had a population of 4,878. Adairsville is roughly halfway between Atlanta and Chattanooga on Interstate 75. It is 12 miles (19 km) north of Kingston, 12 miles (19 km) south of Calhoun, 18 miles (29 km) northeast of Rome, and 61 miles (98 km) north of Atlanta.

== History ==
Adairsville was a small Cherokee village named after Chief Walter (John) S. Adair, a Scottish settler who married a Cherokee Indian woman before the removal of the Cherokee in 1838. It was part of the Cherokee territory along with Calhoun and including New Echota.

After the removal of the Cherokees, the village became part of Georgia, and the residents kept the name Adairsville. One of the town's developers was William Watts, who had a railroad business interest in the town. He had brought the Western and Atlantic Railroad from Atlanta (still in use). He deeded land to the railroad and surveyed business lots, including hotels, mills, and blacksmith shops around town. Watts's plan was successful and brought the town the nickname "Granary of the State"; it was incorporated in 1854. He lived in Adairsville in a home built on the foundation of an Indian cabin, on a hill overlooking the town.

During the Civil War, Adairsville was involved on the side of the Confederate States of America in 1861 against the Union. On April 12, 1862, the steam locomotive The General was pursued from Atlanta and passed through Adairsville as its people the Great Locomotive Chase. After that, Adairians set a three-day street festival in remembrance of the chase. The Civil War came to the town in full force on May 17, 1864, when the Confederate army failed to defeat Sherman and his Union army during the Atlanta campaign in the Battle of Adairsville. After the Civil War ended in 1865, Adairsville rebuilt and became a center of the carpet and textile industries, and of farm and transportation services, including its famous railroad. Historic buildings still intact in the town include the original train depot, which was involved in the Great Locomotive Chase.

Adairsville is well known for Barnsley Gardens, the site of the now-derelict mansion of Godfrey Barnsley.

On January 30, 2013, around 11:30 am, the city was struck by a violent, high-end EF3 tornado, leaving one dead, dozens injured, and hundreds of businesses and residences destroyed.

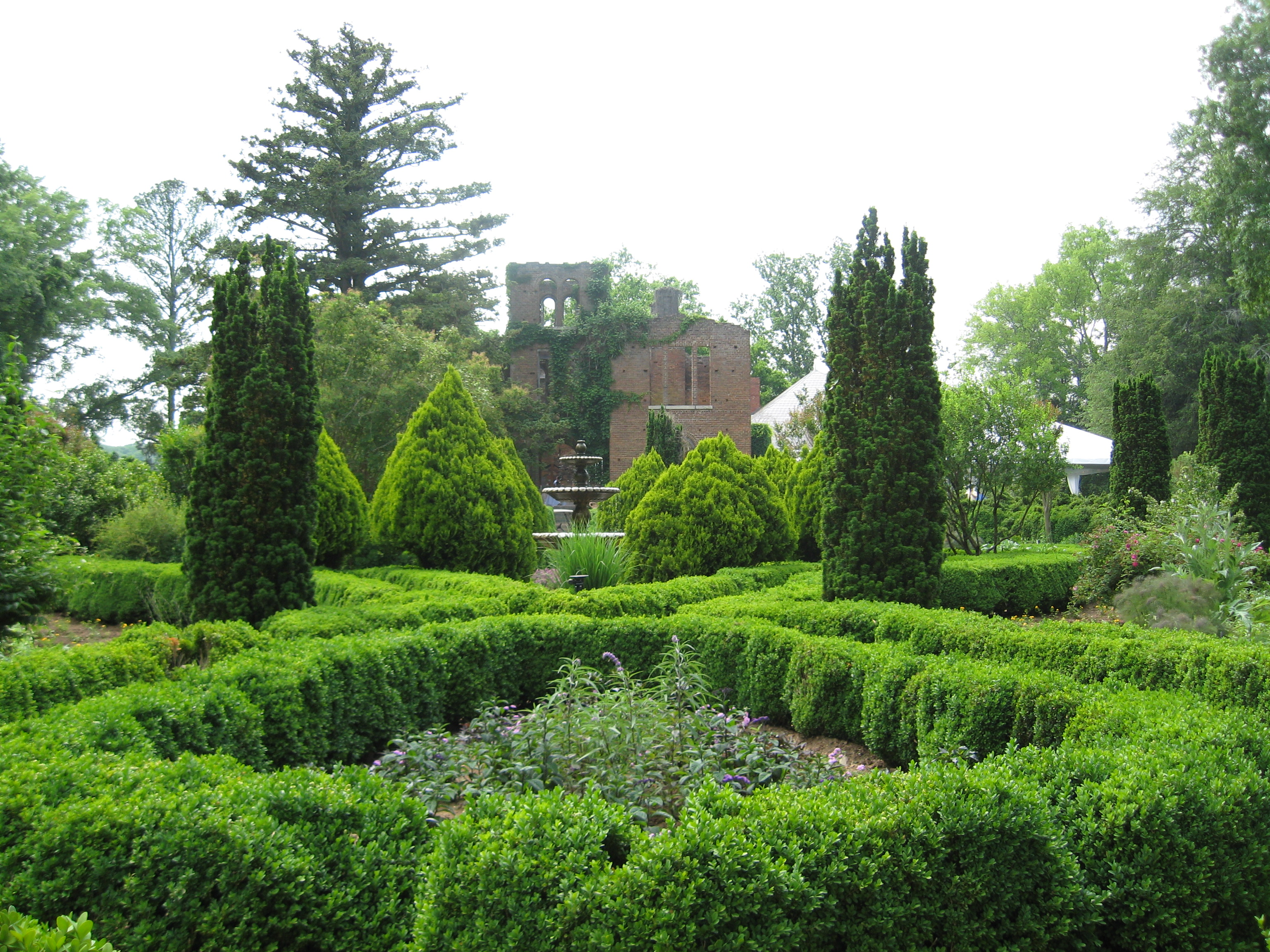
Ruins of the original Barnsley Gardens home and surrounding garden foliage

== Geography ==
Adairsville is an exurban city at the northwest edge of metro Atlanta, at 34°22′6″N 84°55′42″W (34.368925, −84.928212). U.S. Route 41 passes through the city, leading north to Calhoun and south to Cartersville. Interstate 75 runs through the eastern part of the city, with access from Exit 306 (State Route 140).

According to the United States Census Bureau, the city has a total area of 9.1 square miles (23.6 km^{2}), all land.

=== Climate ===
Adairsville's climate is characterized by relatively high temperatures and evenly distributed precipitation throughout the year. According to the Köppen climate classification, it has a humid subtropical climate, Cfa on climate maps.

Climate data for Adairsville, Georgia (1981–2010 normals)
Month	Jan	Feb	Mar	Apr	May	Jun	Jul	Aug	Sep	Oct	Nov	Dec	Year
Mean daily maximum °F (°C)	50.7 (10.4)	55.3 (12.9)	63.5 (17.5)	72.3 (22.4)	79.8 (26.6)	87.5 (30.8)	90.2 (32.3)	89.5 (31.9)	83.4 (28.6)	73.9 (23.3)	63.0 (17.2)	53.1 (11.7)	71.9 (22.2)
Mean daily minimum °F (°C)	30.3 (−0.9)	33.4 (0.8)	40.0 (4.4)	47.5 (8.6)	55.9 (13.3)	64.7 (18.2)	68.6 (20.3)	67.7 (19.8)	60.3 (15.7)	47.7 (8.7)	39.5 (4.2)	32.7 (0.4)	49.1 (9.5)
Average precipitation inches (mm)	4.96 (126)	4.85 (123)	4.98 (126)	4.12 (105)	4.00 (102)	3.89 (99)	4.19 (106)	3.90 (99)	3.67 (93)	3.62 (92)	4.17 (106)	4.59 (117)	50.94 (1,294)
Average precipitation days (≥ 0.01 in)	10.2	9.8	9.5	8.3	9.1	9.3	10.3	9.0	7.1	6.2	8.2	9.6	106.6
Source: NOAA (temperature at Calhoun)

== Demographics ==
Historical population
Census	Pop.	Note	%±
1860	333		—
1870	603		81.1%
1880	391		−35.2%
1890	531		35.8%
1900	616		16.0%
1910	751		21.9%
1920	814		8.4%
1930	765		−6.0%
1940	827		8.1%
1950	916		10.8%
1960	1,026		12.0%
1970	1,676		63.4%
1980	1,739		3.8%
1990	2,131		22.5%
2000	2,542		19.3%
2010	4,648		82.8%
2020	4,878		4.9%
U.S. Decennial Census; 1850-1870 1880; 1890-1910 1920-1930; 1930-1940 1940-1950; 1960-1980 1980-2000

=== 2020 census ===
As of the 2020 census, Adairsville had a population of 4,878, with 1,828 households and 1,267 families residing in the city.

The median age was 34.0 years; 27.3% of residents were under 18 and 11.7% were 65 or older. For every 100 females, there were 95.3 males, and for every 100 females 18 and over, there were 90.8 males 18 and over.

About 91.4% of residents lived in urban areas, while 8.6% lived in rural areas.

Of the 1,828 households in Adairsville, 38.7% had children under 18 living in them, 43.3% were married-couple households, 20.1% were households with a male householder and no spouse or partner present, and 29.0% were households with a female householder and no spouse or partner present. About 25.3% of all households were made up of individuals, and 9.2% had someone living alone who was 65 or older.

The city had 1,951 housing units, of which 6.3% were vacant. The homeowner vacancy rate was 2.9% and the rental vacancy rate was 4.5%.

Adairsville racial composition
Race	Number	Percentage
White (non-Hispanic)	3,644	74.7%
Black or African American (non-Hispanic)	581	11.91%
Native American	8	0.16%
Asian	73	1.5%
Pacific Islander	1	0.02%
Other/mixed	246	5.04%
Hispanics or Latinos	325	6.66%

=== 2000 census ===
As of the 2000 census, 2,542 people, 991 households, and 702 families resided in the city. The population density was 411.9 inhabitants per square mile (159.0/km^{2}). The 1,103 housing units had an average density of 178.7 per square mile (69.0/km^{2}). The racial makeup of the city was 72.6% White, 22.5% African American, 0.3% Native American, 1.4% Asian, 1.5% from other races, and 1.7% from two or more races. Hispanics or Latinos of any race were 2.0% of the population.

Of the 1,568 households, 35.2% had children under 18 living with them, 78.3% were married couples living together, 19.0% had a female householder with no husband present, and 13.1% were not families. About 15.7% of all households were made up of individuals, and 5.7% had someone living alone who was 65 or older. The average household size was 2.57, and the average family size was 3.08.

In the city, the age distribution was 29.2% under 18, 8.7% from 18 to 24, 29.7% from 25 to 44, 20.4% from 45 to 64, and 12.0% who were 65 or older. The median age was 33 years. For every 100 females, there were 85.1 males. For every 100 females 18 and over, there were 82.4 males.

The median income in the city for a household was $71,214 and for a family was $74,828. Males had a median income of $31,123 versus $21,899 for females. The per capita income for the city was $14,828. About 16.4% of families and 18.9% of the population were below the poverty line, including 24.4% of those under 18 and 22.1% of those 65 or over.

== Notable people ==
- Godfrey Barnsley, 19th-century cotton magnate after whom Barnsley Gardens is named
- Vic Beasley, first-round draft pick for the Atlanta Falcons
- Bobby Cox, Atlanta Braves manager
- Pretty Boy Floyd, a 1930s Midwestern outlaw, was born in Adairsville shortly before his family left Georgia for Oklahoma.
- Wally Fowler, singer, founder of the Oak Ridge Boys
- Henry Morgan Green (1877–1939) physician, healthcare leader, and college founder; born in Adairsville
- Bella Jarrett, actress and author
