= Daniel Dod =

- Born: September 28, 1778; Virginia
- Died: May 9, 1823 (aged 44); New York City
- Occupations: Mathematician, mechanical engineer

Daniel Dod (28 September 1778 – 9 May 1823) was a mathematician and a mechanical engineer. He fabricated the engine for the first steamboat to cross the Atlantic Ocean.

== Biography ==
Dod was educated at Rutgers College, and became distinguished for his mathematical acquirements. He was especially devoted to the construction of steam machinery, beginning when steam navigation was in its infancy, and soon became one of the most successful engine builders in the country. In 1811 he declined an appointment in Rutgers as professor of mathematics, in order to devote himself to this business. His mechanical constructions were different from former ones, and, having proved superior to all others, were generally adopted. In 1819 the “SS Savannah,” with an engine of his building, made the first steamship voyage across the Atlantic, and returned in safety after visiting England and Russia.

In 1821, Dod moved to New York City, where he was reputed the most successful engine builder in the United States. In 1823, having altered the machinery of a steamboat, he went on board to witness the effect of his repair by a trial trip on the East River. The boiler exploded, and so severely injured Dod that he died a few days thereafter.

== Family ==
Thaddeus Dod, a Presbyterian minister, was the uncle of Daniel Dod. Albert Baldwin Dod, a mathematician and theologian, was the son of Daniel Dod.

== Bibliography ==
- Wilson, J. G.; Fiske, J., eds. (1900). "Dod, Thaddeus" . Appletons' Cyclopædia of American Biography. New York: D. Appleton.
- Gilman, D. C.; Peck, H. T.; Colby, F. M., eds. (1905). "Dod, Daniel" . New International Encyclopedia (1st ed.). New York: Dodd, Mead.
- Rines, George Edwin, ed. (1920). "Dod, Daniel" . Encyclopedia Americana.

Attribution
