= George Knight (Australian footballer) =

Australian rules footballer (1887–1947)

Personal information
- Full name: George John Knight
- Born: 9 February 1887; Carngham, Victoria
- Died: 13 January 1947 (aged 59); Ercildoune, Victoria
- Original team: Brighton
- Height: 175 cm (5 ft 9 in)

Playing career^{1}
Years	Club	Games (Goals)
1913	Melbourne	3 (1)
- ^{1} Playing statistics correct to the end of 1913.

George John Knight (9 February 1887 – 13 January 1947) was an Australian rules footballer who played with Melbourne in the Victorian Football League (VFL).
