= Charles Warren Bird =

Charles Warren Bird (1919–2009) was a Canadian veteran.

Born in Peepeekisis Cree Nation in Saskatchewan on 14 December 1919, Bird enlisted with the Regina Rifles and was wounded in Operation Overlord. After recovering in hospital in London, he participated in several battles in Northern France and was a prisoner of war. After the war he worked as a labourer until retiring in 1985.

At the time of his death in 2009, he was "the last surviving Canadian First Nations soldier who stormed Juno Beach".
