= Moses Rogers =

19th Century American steamboat captain

Captain Moses Rogers (born New London, Connecticut, January 1779; died in South Carolina, November 15, 1821, age 42) was a commander of first-generation steam-powered boats in the 1810s, including both steamboats and a hybrid vessel that used both engine and sail for propulsion, the SS Savannah. He is best known for commanding the Savannah on its voyage from its namesake port to Liverpool in May–June 1819.

== Biography ==
Rogers commanded pioneer steamboats in the New York City region in 1809–1817, including boats for inventor Robert Fulton. He served as master on the pioneer voyage of the Phoenix from New York Harbor to the estuary of the Delaware River in 1809, credited as having been the first ocean-going steam-powered voyage in American waters. After the end of the War of 1812, brokers who shipped cotton, grown by persons classified as slaves, made profitable trades from Southern ports such as Savannah, Georgia. Savannah businessmen formed the Savannah Steamship Company, and deputized Rogers to launch the firm, find a boat, and become its commander. Returning to New York City in 1818, Captain Rogers located a 109-foot-long sailing packet being built at a Manhattan shipyard. Rogers worked with local suppliers to have the sailing ship refitted as an ocean-going steam vessel. Working with New Jersey enginebuilder Stephen Vail, Rogers located a 90 h.p. engine that could be fitted into the 320-ton sailing packet's hull. Weak by the standards of later steamships, the year-1818 engine could drive the ship at speeds up to 6 knots. The pioneer hybrid vessel was launched on August 22, 1822, in New York City, and docked in North New Jersey for fitting-out.

=== The Savannah ===
The hybrid sail-steam vessel had its paddlewheels, upper works, masts, and rigging erected by spring 1819, and underwent sea trials in New York Bay in March 1819. Working quickly, the Savannah Steamship Co. financed the hybrid vessel's deadhead trip southward from Greater New York to her home port, starting March 28, 1819. The log shows no passengers or cargo were on board, and it is conjectured that despite Rogers' command experience New York City shippers were boycotting the pioneering vessel. With publicity in mind, Rogers and his empty boat showed up in Savannah at a time that coincided with a publicized visit to the Georgia port city of U.S. President James Monroe. Captain Rogers offered to take the President and his personal staff on an excursion cruise through Savannah Harbor. The presidential outing, from Savannah to Tybee Island Light and return, took place on May 11, 1819, and Rogers promptly turned his vessel's bow towards England. Following unsuccessful attempts to rustle up passengers or a cargo, the captain and crew left Savannah on May 22, the date later celebrated as United States National Maritime Day. In place of a cargo, the vessel was weighed down with 75 tons of coal and 25 cords of wood. One of the chief responsibilities of Captain Rogers and his sailing master, cousin Stevens Rogers, was to trade off when the vessel would have steam up as opposed to moving under canvas. The vessel's fuel load and its engine's rate of consumption would allow only about 80 hours of time under steam.

On June 20, 1819, Rogers brought the Savannah into harbor at Liverpool. This was the first voyage by a steam-powered hybrid vessel across the Atlantic Ocean; but of Captain Rogers' 707-hour voyage, only 80 hours had been under steam. Word followed the pioneering vessel across the Atlantic that Savannah Steamship Company's money was running out, and the captain bought more coal and ordered the vessel to proceed across the North Sea and up the Baltic to show her to potential buyers in Sweden and in Russia. From July through October 1819, Rogers and his vessel called at the ports of Stockholm, St. Petersburg, and Copenhagen. Captain Rogers's offers-to-sell were heard, and he exchanged visits with high-ranking members of the courts of Sweden and Russia, but neither nation bought the vessel. Captain Rogers and his crew brought the Savannah back to North America under sail in late 1819, and the captain and his boat were both paid off.

=== Later life ===
Rogers found new backers and began operating a steam-powered riverboat service on the Pee Dee River. He is described as being successful in this venture, but died of typhoid fever on the South Carolina section of the river on November 15, 1821, age 42. His life and achievement were largely forgotten until the inauguration of the 32nd U.S. president, New York maritime enthusiast and shipping heir Franklin D. Roosevelt. President Roosevelt oversaw the inauguration of May 22 as United States National Maritime Day, an unofficial U.S. holiday, and a 1942 World War II Liberty Ship was named in Rogers' honor.
