= George Walton Knight =

Confederate officer (1823–1869)

- Born: May 7, 1823; Atlanta, Georgia, U.S.
- Died: April 19, 1869 (aged 45); Atlanta, Georgia, U.S.
- Burial place: Oakland Cemetery, Atlanta, Georgia, U.S.
- Military career
- Allegiance: Confederate States of America
- Branch: Confederate States Army
- Rank: Lieutenant; Captain
- Conflicts: Mexican–American War; American Civil War

George Walton Knight (May 7, 1823 – April 19, 1869) was a lieutenant in the Mexican–American War and a captain in the Confederate States Army during the American Civil War. He was also a scholar, an educator and a lawyer.

== Early life ==
Knight was born in 1823 in Atlanta, Georgia. His father was Walton Knight. George Walton, one of his paternal descendants, was a signer of the Declaration of Independence.

== Career ==
Knight founded Atlanta Business College, the city's first such establishment.

In 1846, he was a lieutenant in the Mexican–American War. Sixteen years later, during the American Civil War, he was elected captain of Company G of the 56th Regiment of Georgia Volunteers. He resigned just over a year later due to ill health.

== Personal life ==
Knight married twice. His second wife was Clara Corinne Daniel, who became a noted teacher in the Atlanta public schools system. They had two known children: historian Lucian in 1868 and Marie the following year. Marie died at the age of 24.

== Death ==
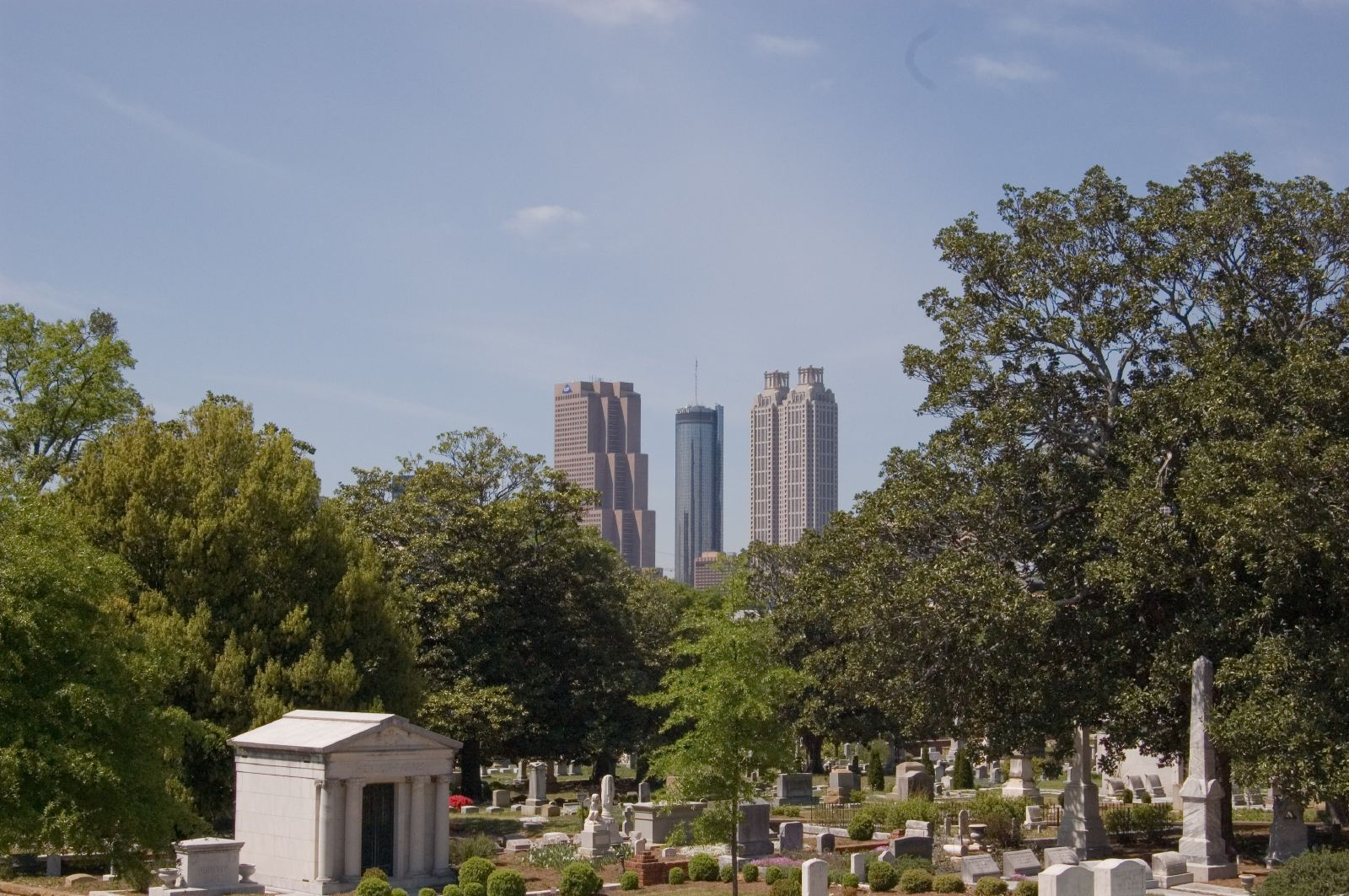
Oakland Cemetery, Atlanta, in which Knight is buried

Knight died in 1869, aged 45, in Atlanta. He was interred in that city's Oakland Cemetery. He left an 18-year-old widow with two infants, whose guardianship passed to a maternal uncle, Dr. John B. Daniel, a businessman of Atlanta and a devout Presbyterian elder.

His widow was buried beside him upon her death in 1904.
