= Georgia's Landmarks, Memorials and Legends =

Work by Lucian Lamar Knight

- The book's title page
- Author: Lucian Lamar Knight
- Language: English
- Genre: History
- Publisher: Byrd Printing Company
- Publication date: Volume 1: 1913 (113 years ago); Volume 2: 1914 (112 years ago)
- Publication place: United States
- Media type: Hardback book

Georgia's Landmarks, Memorials and Legends is a two-volume book by Lucian Lamar Knight, published in 1913 and 1914 by Byrd Printing Company. In his spare time, over four years, Knight visited every section of Georgia in person for his research, analyzing court-house records, reading files of old newspapers and visiting cemeteries. The first volume is divided into two parts: the first titled Landmarks and Memorials is 56 chapters; the second titled Historical Outlines, Original Settlers, and Distinguished Residents of the Counties of Georgia. The last place listed in the second part of the first volume is Worth, Georgia.

Knight wrote his preface in Atlanta, Georgia, on March 25, 1913. The first volume was published later that year.

The first volume is dedicated "to the patriotic women of Georgia" whose diligence saved the "fading records of our great commonwealth" and made them "guardians of Georgia's immortality". He also praises the work of Laura S. Walker, specifically her unearthing "Georgia's buried towns". The second volume, published in 1914 and containing seven sections, is dedicated to Frances and Mary, and Knight's mother, Clara Corinne Knight (1848–1904), a teacher in Atlanta's public schools.
