= George Knight (cricketer, born 1835) =

English cricketer (1835–1901)

Personal information
- Full name: George Knight
- Born: 28 March 1835; Petworth, Sussex, England
- Died: 8 January 1901 (aged 65); Petworth, Sussex, England
- Batting: Right-handed
- Bowling: Unknown arm underarm slow
- Role: Wicket-keeper

Domestic team information
- Years: Team
- 1860–1874: Sussex

Career statistics
Competition	First-class
Matches	13
Runs scored	125
Batting average	6.25
100s/50s	–/–
Top score	21
Balls bowled	88
Wickets	1
Bowling average	43.00
5 wickets in innings	–
10 wickets in match	–
Best bowling	1/25
Catches/stumpings	8/11
- Source: Cricinfo, 8 January 2012

George Knight (28 March 1835 – 8 January 1901) was an English cricketer. Knight was a right-handed batsman who fielded as a wicket-keeper. He occasionally bowled underarm slow. He was born at Petworth, Sussex.

Knight made his first-class debut for Sussex against Kent in 1860. He played infrequently for Sussex over the next fourteen years, making twelve further first-class appearances, the last of which came against Gloucestershire in 1874. In his thirteen first-class appearances, he scored a total of 125 runs at an average of 6.25, with a high score of 21. In the field he took 8 catches and made 11 stumpings. With his occasionally underarm bowling, he took just a single wicket.

He died at the town of his birth on 8 January 1901.
