= Charlotte De Bernier Taylor =

American entomologist

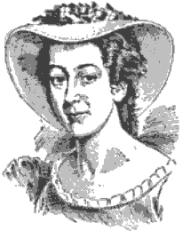
- Born: August 4, 1806; Savannah, Georgia
- Died: November 26, 1861 (aged 55); Isle of Man
- Education: Madam Binze's School
- Occupation: Entomologist
- Spouse: James Taylor (m. 1829)
- Children: 3

Charlotte De Bernier Scarbrough Taylor (August 4, 1806 – November 26, 1861) was an American entomologist.

== Life ==
Born in Savannah, Georgia, in 1806, daughter of William Scarbrough and Julia (née Bernard), Taylor was educated at Madam Binze's School in New York, after which she made a tour of Europe. On her return to Georgia in 1829, she married James Taylor, a wealthy merchant, with whom she had two daughters and one son, lived in Savannah as a person of means, raised the family and became involved in social affairs, scientific studies and writing.

Just before the start of the American Civil War, Taylor went to England to write a book about plantation life, but died of tuberculosis on the Isle of Man in 1861, aged 55.

== Works ==
During the 1830s, Taylor began to study insects seriously, publishing her findings in general literary magazines. She studied insects related to cotton growing for fifteen years before publishing in American magazines, notably Harper's New Monthly Magazine, in the 1850s. She also investigated insects related to wheat. She is thought to have published about 19 articles in all, including the following:

- "The Flea." Harper's New Monthly Magazine 19 (June–November 1859): 178-189 (This article as well as Taylor's earlier work published in this magazine is unsigned, which was true for all articles in this magazine until volume 20.)

Taylor also wrote and illustrated a book published by Saunders, Otley, & Co. in 1859 titled Scenes In Southern Plantation Life.

Taylor used powerful magnifying glasses to study insects and illustrated her articles with intricate drawings, in which endeavour she was assisted by her daughters. She published a study on the silkworm and wrote about the natural history and anatomy of spiders. On her journey to England she made microscopic studies of sea water.

Taylor is recognized as having produced significant and accurate work that is of high quality. This work may not have been recognized due to the fact that she published in popular magazines and wrote in entertaining literary style.
