= Charles Smith Bird =

English academic, cleric and tutor

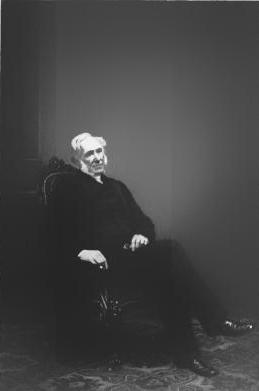
Charles Smith Bird

Charles Smith Bird (1795–1862) was an English academic, cleric and tutor, known as a theological author and writer of devotional verse, and described as a High Church Evangelical. He was the author of several significant books against Tractarianism.

== Life ==
His father was William Bird (died 1814), a West Indies merchant; of a religious character, he objected, for instance, to his children reading Shakespeare. Charles Smith Bird was the fifth of six children, born in Union Street, Liverpool, 28 May 1795. After attending private schools, he was articled to a firm of conveyancing solicitors at Liverpool in 1812.

Bird went back in 1815 to Macclesfield grammar school, under David Davies (1755–1828). He entered Trinity College, Cambridge, where he became a scholar in 1818. He was third Wrangler in 1820, was awarded a Smith's Prize behind Henry Coddington, and elected a Fellow of his college.

Bird was then ordained and became curate of Burghfield, six miles from Reading, Berkshire, and lived in a house at Culverlands, near Burghfield, in 1823. His marriage in that year meant he had to give up his Trinity fellowship. He took pupils for twenty years, an early one being Thomas Babington Macaulay who joined a reading party at Llanrwst in 1821.

In 1840 Bird became a sort of part-time curate to Rev. Alan Briscoe (died 1845) at Sulhamstead Abbots. Having given up his house at Burghfield, he took the curacy of Fawley near Henley-on-Thames. In 1843 he was given the vicarage of Gainsborough, Lincolnshire, with a prebendal stall of Lincoln Cathedral. There he led a quiet life, occasionally lecturing at the Gainsborough Literary and Mechanics' Institute on natural history, English literature, and other subjects. In the summer of 1844 he went to Scotland, and in the next year preached before Cambridge University four sermons on the parable of the sower.

In 1849 cholera ravaged Gainsborough, and Bird ministered to his parishioners. In 1852 Bird suffered himself a severe illness. In 1859 he was appointed chancellor of Lincoln Cathedral, and left Gainsborough. He died at the Chancery, aged 67, and was buried in the churchyard at Riseholme. A painted window to his memory was added to Gainsborough Church.

== Works ==
Bird sent contributions to the Christian Observer. Against the Irish educational measures for Catholics, he wrote Call to the Protestants of England, later inserted among his poems. For Ever, and other Devotional Poems appeared in 1833.

In 1839 Bird edited a monthly periodical of his own, the Reading Church Guardian, which lasted for a year. The proposal for the admission of Jews into parliament aroused Bird's indignation. His Call to Britain to remember the Fate of Jerusalem is one of his longer poems. An autobiography in the third person, Sketches from the life of the Rev. —, appeared posthumously in 1864.

The views Bird held were related to those of George Stanley Faber, combining justification by faith with support of episcopacy, and some sympathy with Calvinism, for a "moderate evangelicalism". Bird was reticent by nature, publishing his 1838 work against the Tracts for the Times at the urging of Henry Budd. Among his other friends were Sir Claudius Hunter, 1st Baronet, George Thomas Hutton the rector of Gate-Burton, Alfred Ollivant, and the Rev. Joseph Jones of Repton. As an opponent of the Tractarians, he wrote:

- The Oxford Tract System considered with reference to the principle of Reserve in Preaching, 1838.
- Transubstantiation tried by Scripture and Reason, addressed to the Protestant inhabitants of Reading, in consequence of the attempts recently made to introduce Romanism amongst them, 1839.
- A Plea for the Reformed Church, or Observations on a plain and most important declaration of the Tractarians in the "British Critic" for July, 1841. This work took issue with an anonymous article in the British Critic, on John Jewel. There was a reply on behalf of the Tractarians by Frederick Oakeley, who had written the article.
- The Baptismal Privileges, the Baptismal Vow, and the Means of Grace, as they are set forth in the Church Catechism, considered in six Lent Lectures preached at Sulhamstead, Berks, 1841; 2nd ed. 1843.
- A Defence of the Principles of the English Reformation from the Attacks of the Tractarians; or a Second Plea for the Reformed Church, 1843.

Other works were:

- The Parable of the Sower, four Sermons preached before the University of Cambridge in May 1845.
- The Dangers attending an immediate Revival of Convocation detailed in a letter to the Rev. G. Hutton, rector of Gate-Burton, 1852.
- The Sacramental and Priestly System examined; or Strictures on Archdeacon Wilberforce's Works on the Incarnation and Eucharist, 1854. Against Robert Wilberforce, whose The Doctrine of the Holy Eucharist (1853) Bird criticised, with reference to the views of Edward Reynolds.
- The Eve of the Crucifixion, 1858.

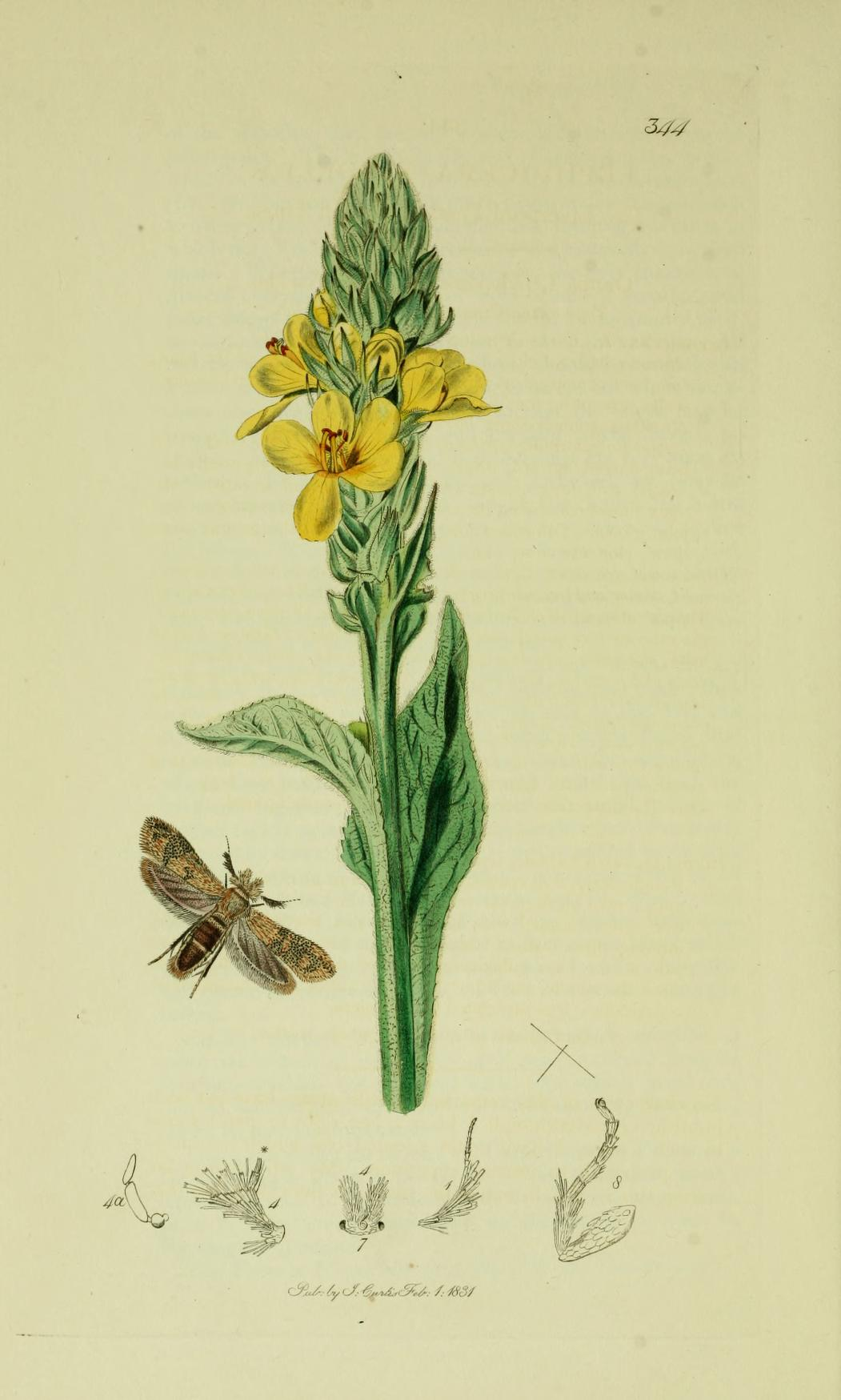
Illustration of the moth Lepidocera birdella, now called Ochsenheimeria taurella

Bird was also an entomologist, and became a fellow of the Linnean Society in 1828, publishing in the Entomological Magazine. A moth Lepidocera birdella was named for him by John Curtis.

== Family ==
On 24 June 1823 Bird married Margaret Wrangham, of Bowdon, Cheshire. Three sons (William, Claude Smith, and Charles James) were Cambridge graduates, all going into the church. A daughter married H. C. Barker, who had been Bird's curate, in 1849. Claude Smith Bird published Sketches from the Life of the Rev. Charles Smith Bird (1864).

== Notes ==
Attribution

This article incorporates text from a publication now in the public domain: Stephen, Leslie, ed. (1886). "Bird, Charles Smith". Dictionary of National Biography. Vol. 5. London: Smith, Elder & Co.
