= Lucian Lamar Knight =

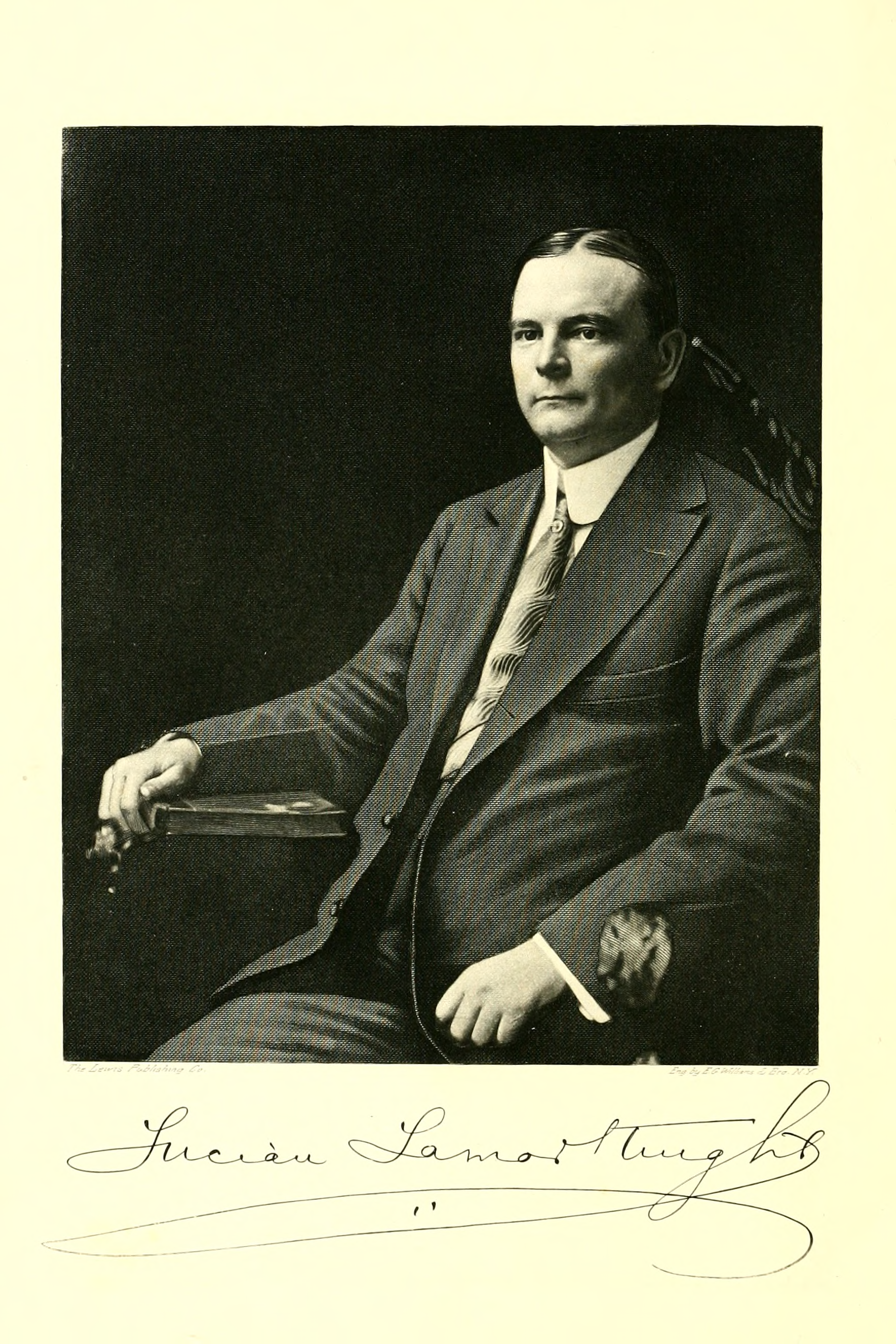
- Pictured in 1917
- Born: February 9, 1868; Atlanta, Georgia, U.S.
- Died: November 19, 1933 (aged 65); Clearwater, Florida, U.S.
- Resting place: Christ Church Episcopal Cemetery, St. Simons, Georgia, U.S.
- Occupation: Writer
- Spouse(s): Edith Maria Nelson (m. 1895); Rosa Talbot (m. 1917–1933; his death)
- Parent(s): George Walton Knight; Clara Corinne Daniel

Lucian Lamar Knight FRSA (February 9, 1868 – November 19, 1933) was an American journalist, editor, author, and historian. He was the founder of the Georgia Archives. In 1919, in recognition of his work in history, he was made a Fellow of the Royal Society of Arts of England. The University of Georgia awarded him an LL. D., while his master's degree came from Princeton University. He was also a Phi Beta Kappa.

== Early life and education ==
Lucian Lamar Knight was born in Atlanta, Georgia, on February 9, 1868. His father, Capt. George Walton Knight, served in the Mexican–American War and the Civil War. His mother was Clara Corinne (Daniel) Knight, distinguished as an educator. His first ancestor of the Knight name was settled at Jamestown, Virginia, as early as 1624. Besides his father, he had three uncles in the Confederate States Army. On his mother's side, he was also a Lamar; on his father's a Walton ― both historic Southern families. Chawton Manor was the Knight family's ancestral home in England; Jane Austen belonged to this connection.

Clara Knight was widowed in 1869, with two infants. Lucian's guardianship passed to a maternal uncle, Dr. John B. Daniel, a businessman of Atlanta, and a devout Presbyterian elder.

Knight was educated in the public schools of Atlanta, the University of Georgia (A.B., 1888), and at Princeton (honorary M.A., 1904). While an undergraduate at the University of Georgia, he won the debater's medal, received a speaker's place at commencement, on three merits class-stand, composition, and declamation, pronounced a eulogy on Chancellor Mell, edited the college annual, and, on graduating, was class orator and valedictorian. After graduation from the University of Georgia, Knight read law under Judge Richard F. Lyon, at Macon, Georgia.

== Career ==
For ten years, Knight served on the staff of The Atlanta Constitution, serving as literary editor during the period of 1892–1902. Here he was associated with Joel Chandler Harris in the writing of editorials; and when Knight's first work came from the press, it carried an introduction from "Uncle Remus".

Under a powerful conviction of duty, Knight, in 1902, relinquished his writing and entered the theological seminary at Princeton to prepare himself for the Presbyterian ministry. While here he also took post-graduate work in the university and received his degree of Master of Arts. Before completing his studies, he was called to the Central Presbyterian Church of Washington, D.C., the church of which President Woodrow Wilson later became a member. While at Princeton, Knight studied under Wilson and was also a frequent visitor in the Wilson home. Ill health necessitated an abandonment of Knight's ministerial career.

After several months spent in foreign travel, he returned home but little improved, and on the advice of his physician, he went to Southern California, where he remained for two years (1906–08), spending most of his time on Catalina Island. His first work was written at Avalon, a fisherman's village, on the island. Here he wrote the two volumes which composed the Reminiscenses.

At the invitation of his alma mater, Knight returned to deliver the alumni address at the University of Georgia, and took for his subject, "Lee's Old War Horse; an Appeal Before the Bar of Public Opinion on Behalf of Lieutenant-general James Longstreet." On recovering his health, he accepted the associate-editorship of the Atlanta Georgian in 1909. Besides contributing to The Library of Southern Literature the sketches of two Georgians, Benjamin H. Hill and Thomas E. Watson, Knight compiled the Dictionary of Southern Authors, Vol. XV. He also assisted in the compilation of Memoirs of Georgia (1895), Modern Eloquence (1900), and other works.

Knight was the compiler of the official records of Georgia. delivered literary and historical addresses in various parts of the South. Knight served as second vice-president of the publishing firm of Martin & Hoyt, Atlanta, and vice-president of the John B. Daniel company.

In researching his two-volume book Georgia's Landmarks, Memorials and Legends (1913), Knight, in his spare time over four years, visited every section of Georgia in person, analyzing court-house records, reading files of old newspapers and visiting cemeteries.

As a public speaker, Knight was constantly in demand. He was widely traveled, having several times crossed the ocean.

== Personal life ==
In 1895, he married Edith Maria Nelson (b. 1875), of Atlanta. They had two children: Frances Walton and Mary Lamar.

His second wife was Rosa Talbot. She was a grand-niece of Georgia governor Matthew Talbot, and a kinswoman of Gen. William H. T. Walker.

In politics, he was a Democrat. In religion, he was Presbyterian.

Lucian Lamar Knight died, aged 65, on November 19, 1933, in Clearwater, Florida.

== Selected works ==
- Stone Mountain
- Reminiscences of Famous Georgians
- Georgia's Land-marks, Memorials and Legends
- Memorials of Dixieland
- A standard history of Georgia and Georgians, 1917

=== Editor ===
- Dictionary of Southern Authors (vols. XV and XVI Library of Southern Literature), 1909

=== Assistant editor ===
- Memoirs of Georgia, 1895
- Modern Eloquence, 1899

== See also ==
- The Colonnades
- Druid Hills Presbyterian Church
