= Tornado outbreak of April 4–5, 1977 =

Violent U.S. tornado outbreak in 1977

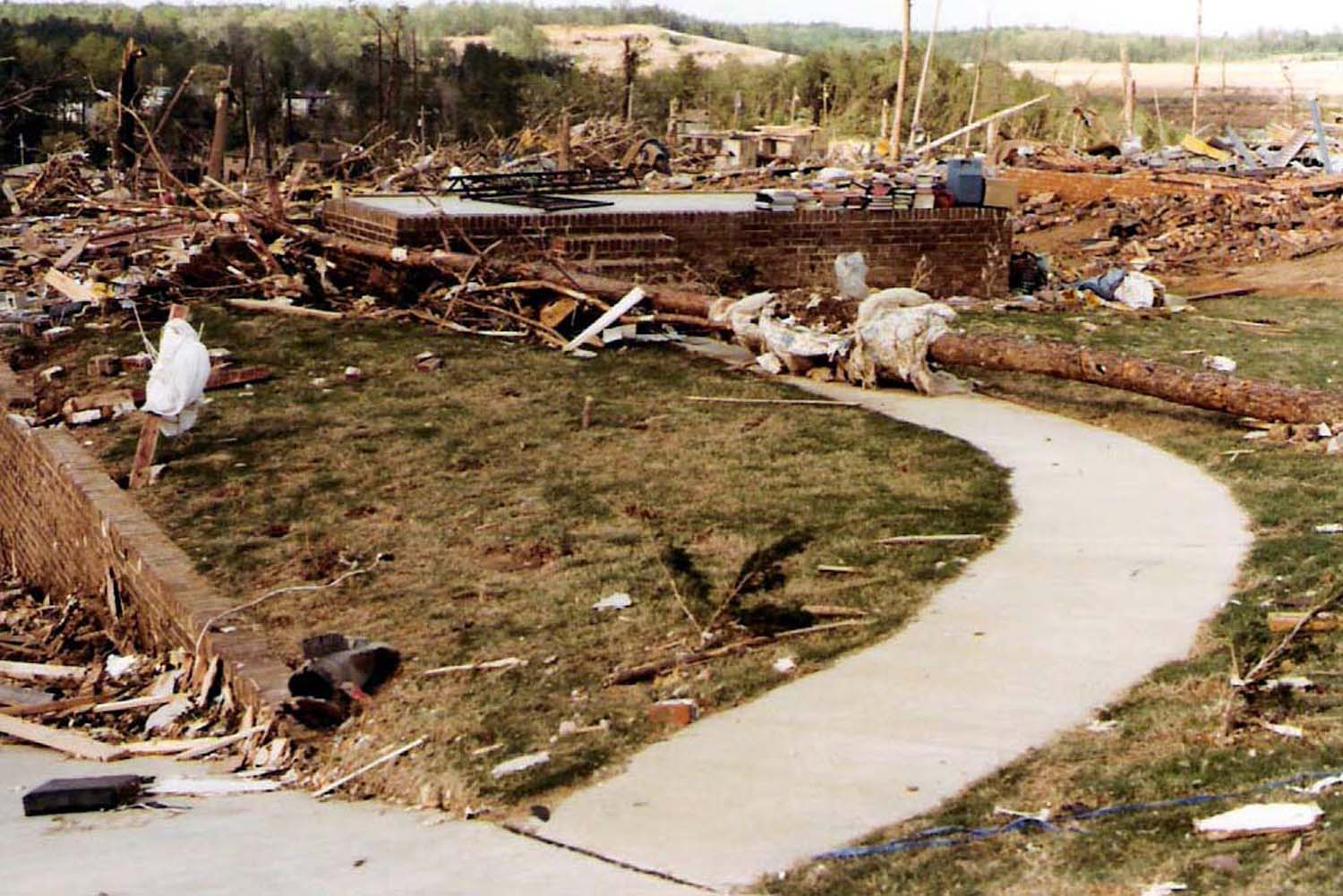
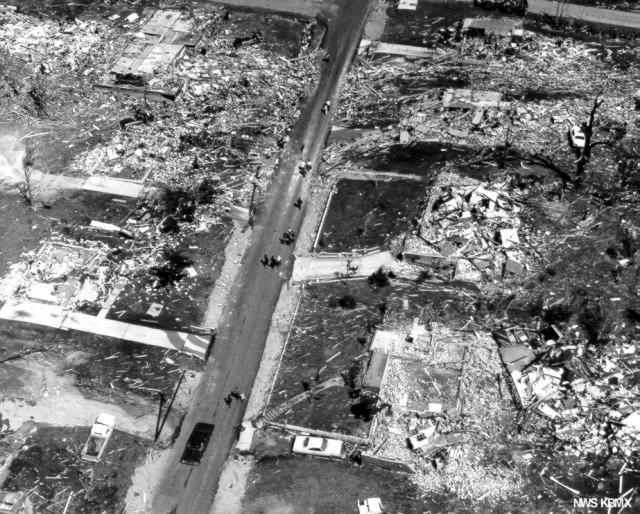
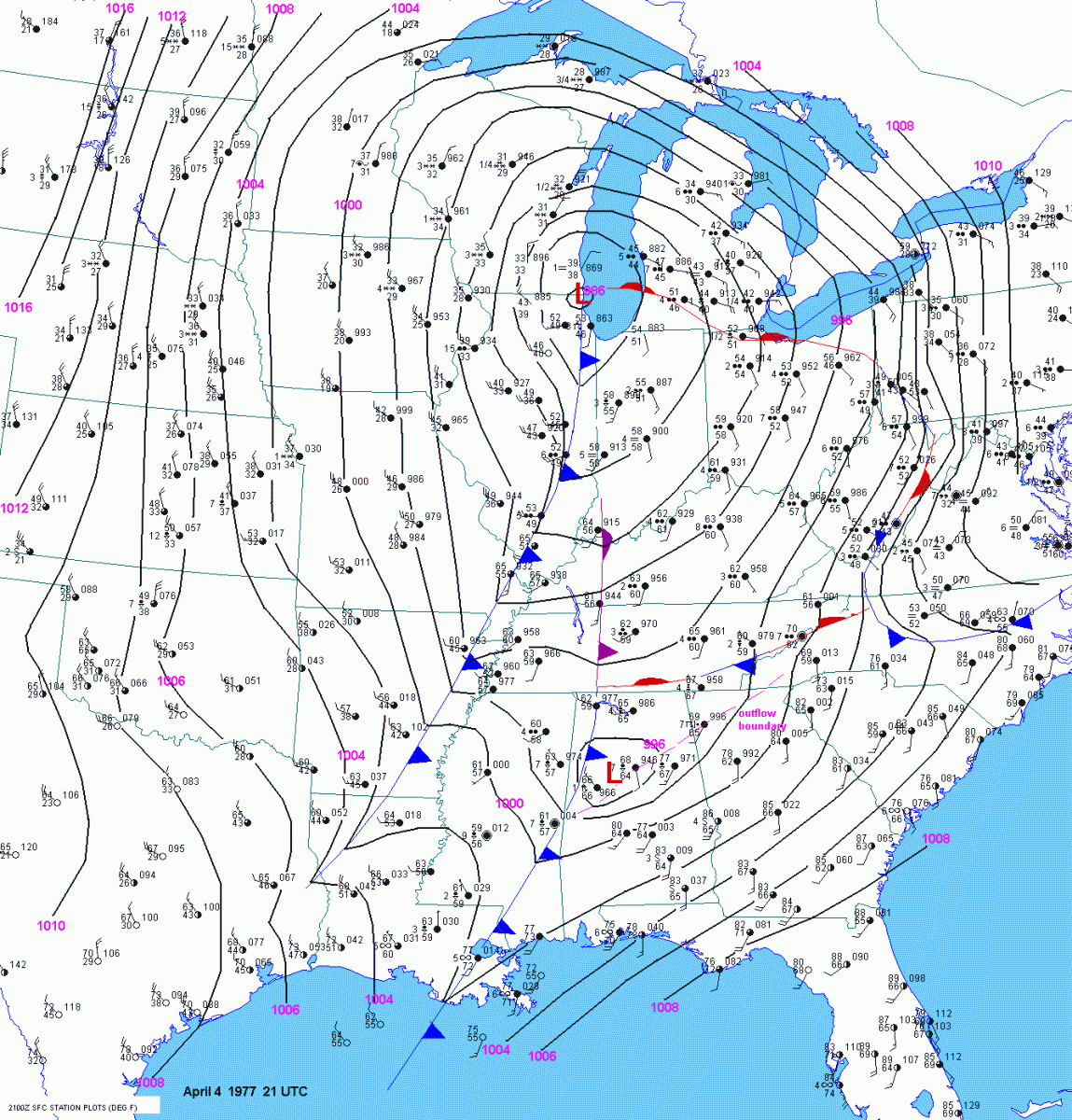
- Clockwise from top: Significant damage to a block home in the Birmingham area, following an F5 tornado on April 4; 2100 UTC April 4 surface analysis, showing a distinct low-pressure system and outflow boundary over Northern Alabama; an aerial view of damage east of US-78 following the Birmingham tornado.

Tornado outbreak
- Tornadoes: 22
- Max. rating: F5 tornado
- Duration: April 4–5, 1977

Overall effects
- Fatalities: 24 (+72 non-tornadic)
- Injuries: 158 (+22 non-tornadic)
- Damage: ~$32.7 million (1977 USD)
- Areas affected: Southeastern United States, particularly Alabama and Georgia
- Part of the Tornadoes of 1977

Throughout the period of April 4–5, 1977, a violent severe weather outbreak impacted the Southeastern United States. A total of 22 tornadoes touched down during this outbreak sequence, with the strongest tornado of the outbreak being a catastrophic and fatal F5 tornado that struck Metro Birmingham during the afternoon hours of April 4. In addition to this tornado, several other tornadoes were reported from the same system, primarily extending across the U.S. states of Alabama, Georgia, and Mississippi. Scattered tornado activity and severe weather were also reported in Indiana, Kentucky, Missouri, North Carolina, Pennsylvania, and Virginia. The outbreak resulted in 24 deaths — 22 from the Birmingham F5 tornado, one from an F2 tornado in St. Clair County, Alabama, and one from an F3 tornado in Floyd County, Georgia. 158 injuries were also reported. The storm system also caused the crash of Southern Airways Flight 242, which killed 72 and injured 22. (Note: An outbreak is generally defined as a group of at least six tornadoes (the number sometimes varies slightly according to local climatology) with no more than a six-hour gap between individual tornadoes. An outbreak sequence, prior to (after) the start of modern records in 1950, is defined as a period of no more than two (one) consecutive days without at least one significant (F2 or stronger) tornado.)

== Outbreak statistics ==
Daily statistics of tornadoes during the tornado outbreak of April 4–5, 1977
Date (Note: All dates are based on the local time zone where the tornado touched down; however, all times are in Coordinated Universal Time and dates are split at midnight CST/CDT for consistency.)	Total	F-scale rating (Note: The Fujita scale was devised under the aegis of scientist T. Theodore Fujita in the early 1970s. Prior to the advent of the scale in 1971, tornadoes in the United States were officially unrated. Tornado ratings were retroactively applied to events prior to the formal adoption of the F-scale by the National Weather Service. While the Fujita scale has been superseded by the Enhanced Fujita scale in the U.S. since February 1, 2007, Canada used the old scale until April 1, 2013; nations elsewhere, like the United Kingdom, apply other classifications such as the TORRO scale.)							Deaths	Injuries	Damage (Note: The National Oceanic and Atmospheric Administration's Storm Data publication does not list exact damage totals for every event, instead giving damage categories. As such, damage for individual tornadoes is not comprehensive.)
Date	Total	FU	F0	F1	F2	F3	F4	F5	Deaths	Injuries	Damage
April 4	19	1	1	5	9	2	0	1	24	157	$29,948,500
April 5	3	0	0	2	1	0	0	0	0	1	$2,775,000
Total	22	1	1	7	10	2	0	1	24	158	$32,723,500

Outbreak death toll
State	Total	County	County total
Alabama	23	Jefferson	22
Alabama	23	St. Clair	1
Georgia	1	Floyd	1
Totals	24		
All deaths were tornado-related

== Confirmed tornadoes ==
Confirmed tornadoes by Fujita rating
FU	F0	F1	F2	F3	F4	F5	Total
1	1	7	10	2	0	1	22

Prior to 1990, there is a likely undercount of tornadoes, particularly E/F0–1, with reports of weaker tornadoes becoming more common as population increased. A sharp increase in the annual average E/F0–1 count by approximately 200 tornadoes was noted upon the implementation of NEXRAD Doppler weather radar in 1990–1991. (Note: Historically, the number of tornadoes globally and in the United States was and is likely underrepresented: research by Grazulis on annual tornado activity suggests that, as of 2001, only 53% of yearly U.S. tornadoes were officially recorded. Documentation of tornadoes outside the United States was historically less exhaustive, owing to the lack of monitors in many nations and, in some cases, to internal political controls on public information. Most countries only recorded tornadoes that produced severe damage or loss of life. Significant low biases in U.S. tornado counts likely occurred through the early 1990s, when advanced NEXRAD was first installed and the National Weather Service began comprehensively verifying tornado occurrences.) 1974 marked the first year where significant tornado (E/F2+) counts became homogenous with contemporary values, attributed to the consistent implementation of Fujita scale assessments. Numerous discrepancies on the details of tornadoes in this outbreak exist between sources. The total count of tornadoes and ratings differs from various agencies accordingly. The list below documents information from the most contemporary official sources alongside assessments from tornado historian Thomas P. Grazulis.

Color/symbol key
Color / symbol	Description
†	Data from Grazulis 1990/1993/2001b
¶	Data from a local National Weather Service office
※	Data from the 1977 Storm Data publication
‡	Data from the NCEI database
♯	Maximum width of tornado
±	Tornado was rated below F2 intensity by Grazulis but a specific rating is unavailable.

List of confirmed tornadoes in the tornado outbreak of April 4–5, 1977
F#	Location	County / Parish	State	Start Coord. (Note: All starting coordinates are based on the NCEI database and may not reflect contemporary analyses)	Date	Time (UTC)	Path length	Width (Note: The listed width values are primarily the average/mean width of the tornadoes, with those having known maximum widths denoted by ♯. From 1952 to 1994, reports largely list mean width whereas contemporary years list maximum width. Values provided by Grazulis are the average width, with estimates being rounded down (i.e. 0.5 mi (0.80 km) is rounded down from 880 yards to 800 yards.)	Damage
F1	S of Florence※	Rankin	Mississippi	32.13°N 90.15°W	April 4	12:00–?	0.1 mi (0.16 km)	50 yd (46 m)	<$1,000※
F1	This tornado touched down along MS 469. A barn lost its tin roof and another incurred negligible damage.								
F2†	WNW of Center to NW of Preston※	Neshoba, Kemper	Mississippi	32.82°N 89.00°W	April 4	14:00–?	10 mi (16 km)※	100 yd (91 m)	$85,000※
F2†	This tornado dissipated a short distance north of MS 21. A few businesses, a pair of homes, and two trailers were wrecked, while outbuildings, barns, and an additional home were damaged.								
F2†	S of Macon to W of Prairie Point	Calhoun	Mississippi	33.05°N 88.55°W	April 4	15:00–?	10 mi (16 km)※	500 yd (460 m)†	$25,000
F2†	This tornado struck the Elon settlement. A silo, a trailer, and a frame-built home were wrecked. Outbuildings on farms were damaged as well, and one person was injured slightly.								
F0	Hannibal※	Marion	Missouri	39.67°N 91.33°W	April 4	15:30–?	0.2 mi (0.32 km)	10 yd (9.1 m)	$2,500
F0	A brief tornado partly unroofed a home and an adjacent carport. Nearby houses suffered minor damage, and several trees were downed.								
F2	Near Hanceville to Center Hill※	Cullman	Alabama	34.07°N 86.77°W	April 4	17:12–?	5.9 mi (9.5 km)‡	200 yd (180 m)	$25,000
F2	A pair of homes were badly damaged and a few trailers were destroyed. Numerous trees were splintered and prostrated as well. A trio of injuries occurred.								
F2	S of Section to N of Dutton	Jackson	Alabama	34.55°N 85.98°W	April 4	18:20–?	5 mi (8.0 km)†	100 yd (91 m)	$250,000
F2	A strong tornado impacted 20 agricultural outbuildings and homes. One person was injured.								
F2	Southern Ragland	St. Clair	Alabama	33.73°N 86.15°W	April 4	18:30–?	0.5 mi (0.80 km)	20 yd (18 m)	$60,000†
F2	Five homes were severely damaged or destroyed.								
F1	Elkton※	Todd	Kentucky	36.82°N 87.15°W	April 4	19:30–?‡	0.8 mi (1.3 km)‡	200 yd (180 m)	$250,000
F1	A farmhouse, four barns, and four trailers were destroyed. Airborne glass injured a small child.								
F2	Eastern Springville	St. Clair	Alabama	33.77°N 86.47°W	April 4	20:00–?	3.3 mi (5.3 km)‡	80 yd (73 m)	$85,000†
F2	21 barns and homes were destroyed or damaged.								
F2	W of Markton to E of Southside	Etowah	Alabama	33.88°N 86.02°W	April 4	20:30–?	5 mi (8.0 km)※	150 yd (140 m)	$250,000
F2	A dozen homes were destroyed or severely damaged. Half a dozen trailers and 17 outbuildings were wrecked or otherwise damaged as well. Four people were injured.								
F2†	N of Ashville† to SE of Steele‡	St. Clair	Alabama	33.83°N 86.25°W	April 4	20:30–?	7.3 mi (11.7 km)‡	150 yd (140 m)	$140,000†
F2†	1 death – Three trailers, seven barns, a house, and a small business were destroyed. A total of 16 other homes were damaged as well, a few of them severely. A woman was killed by a falling tree while refuging in an above-ground storm cellar.								
F5	ESE of Forestdale to ESE of Pinson¶	Jefferson	Alabama	33.52°N 86.93°W	April 4	21:00–21:15	15 mi (24 km)※	1,320 yd (1,210 m)♯※	$25,000,000¶
F5	22 deaths – See section on this tornado								
F3	E of Cave Spring to ESE of Six Mile‡ to Lindale※	Floyd	Georgia	34.17°N 85.20°W	April 4	21:15–?	20 mi (32 km)※	400 yd (370 m)	$2,500,000
F3	1 death – Major damage occurred in Lindale. A dozen trailers were destroyed and nine others were extensively damaged. 24 frame homes were badly damaged or wrecked. Three dairy farms sustained major damage, and four others sustained lesser damage. There were 15 injuries.								
F3†	Adairsville to Folsom	Bartow	Georgia	34.37°N 84.93°W	April 4	21:30–?	6 mi (9.7 km)※	100 yd (91 m)	$250,000
F3†	Eight chicken coops, seven service buildings, three trailers, and three houses were destroyed. Multiple other structures were damaged.								
F1	Ramhurst	Murray	Georgia	34.70°N 84.73°W	April 4	21:45–?	2 mi (3.2 km)	100 yd (91 m)	$250,000
F1	10 service buildings, two chicken coops, two mobile homes, and a grist mill were destroyed. A few other houses were damaged.								
FU※	S of Cincinnati	Boone, Kenton	Kentucky	Unknown	April 4	22:00–?	12 mi (19 km)	750 yd (690 m)	$250,000
FU※	This tornado produced scattered damage, occurring at four different spots. A few mobile homes, a pair of garages, nine homes, and 14 barns were destroyed or damaged.								
F1	Edgewood	Madison	Indiana	40.10°N 85.73°W	April 4	23:00–?	0.5 mi (0.80 km)	20 yd (18 m)	$25,000
F1	A house was unroofed and a shed and a garage wrecked.								
F2†	Mill Creek area※	Lumpkin	Georgia	34.50°N 83.95°W	April 4	01:00–?	5.2 mi (8.4 km)‡	400 yd (370 m)	$250,000
F2†	This tornado generated low-end F2 damage. 20 chicken coops were destroyed or damaged. Four homes received damage, and major tree damage occurred as well, with losses to the latter totaling $200,000. An injury was reported.								
F1	S of Traphill to E of Thurmond※	Wilkes	North Carolina	36.32°N 81.02°W	April 4	02:30–?	10 mi (16 km)※	100 yd (91 m)	$250,000
F1	The tornado skipped along its path. Trees, mobile homes, and chicken coops were damaged.								
F1	Eastern Sparks to WNW of Chaserville	Cook	Georgia	31.17°N 83.43°W	April 5	07:45–?	5.4 mi (8.7 km)‡	100 yd (91 m)※	$25,000
F1	A mobile home was destroyed and a few homes slightly damaged. There was also damage to agricultural implements, pecan trees, and outbuildings.								
F1	Onancock※	Accomack	Virginia	37.72°N 75.75°W	April 5	14:03–?※	2 mi (3.2 km)	50 yd (46 m)	$250,000
F1	Two chicken houses, a garage, and several small storage buildings were completely destroyed. A house lost its metal roof and a church lost its bell tower. Most other structural damage was limited to shingles or inflicted by fallen trees. About 15 trees were uprooted and more than 50 sustained minor damage.								
F2	Swatara Township	Dauphin	Pennsylvania	40.25°N 76.83°W	April 5	21:50–22:15※	2 mi (3.2 km)	67 yd (61 m)	$2,500,000
F2	35 homes were destroyed or damaged. Debris from the homes clung to trees. A woman was injured when her trailer was overturned.								

=== Smithfield Estates / Birmingham–Tarrant, Alabama ===
Smithfield Estates / Birmingham–Tarrant, Alabama
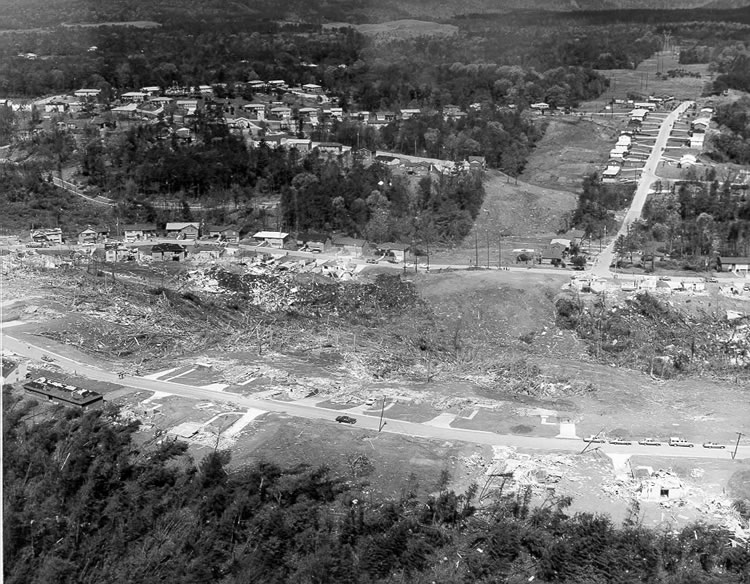
- F5-level damage in the Smithfield Estates subdivision of Birmingham, Alabama

Meteorological history
- Formed: April 4, 1977 , 3:00 p.m. CDT (UTC−05:00)
- Dissipated: April 4, 1977 , 3:15 p.m. CDT (UTC−05:00)
- Duration: 15 minutes

F5 tornado
- on the Fujita scale
- Highest winds: 285 mph (459 km/h)

Overall effects
- Fatalities: 22
- Injuries: 130
- Damage: $25 million ($132,830,000 in 2025 USD)

Developing 4 mi (6.4 km) northwest of Birmingham, near US 78, this violent tornado proceeded northeastward through northern Jefferson County. Near the point of touchdown, Daniel Payne College suffered extensive damage, forcing it to permanently close due to the extent of the destruction. Rapidly intensifying, it generated F5 damage in the neighborhood of Hayes Highland, particularly along and near a lane and drive each named Smithfield, from which the tornado derived its moniker. In this area, abutting the intersection of I-65 and US 31, hundreds of homes were completely destroyed, many of which were completely swept away, despite being well-built. Some of the homes built into hillsides even had their cinder-block basement walls swept away, and at least one home was reportedly annihilated, with even its foundation said to be missing. Many trees in the area were snapped and debarked and vehicles were thrown and destroyed. A pair of dump-trucks were thrown through the air as well. Ted Fujita followed the tornado and supercell from an airplane and while surveying damage; he rated the Smithfield tornado F5, but initially considered assigning a rating of F6. (He once rated the 1970 Lubbock and 1974 Xenia tornadoes as such, but his preliminary estimates were subsequently revised to the official ratings of F5.) The NCEI incorrectly list the path as extending from west of Birmingham to east-northeast of Tarrant.

== Non-tornadic impacts ==
The storms that brought the tornadoes on April 4 also brought a large squall line across Alabama. This proved disastrous when Southern Airways Flight 242 attempted to fly around the storm and instead flew straight into it. Massive amounts of very large hail and very heavy rain battered the plane and destroyed its engines. With no way to keep flying, it attempted a landing on a stretch of highway in New Hope, Georgia. The road section used for the forced landing, formerly called Georgia State Route 92 Spur, is now called Dallas–Acworth Highway (formerly Georgia State Route 381). The DC-9 actually landed successfully, but then crashed into a gas station, grocery store, and other structures and vehicles during the rollout. The plane was destroyed, killing the flight crew, 60 passengers, and nine people on the ground.

== Aftermath, recovery, and records ==
The F5 tornado touched down near the end of the path of three other violent tornadoes that struck the Birmingham region in 1956, 1998, and 2011. The 1956 tornado was an F4 that struck McDonald Chapel and continued through Edgewater, northern Birmingham, Fultondale, and Tarrant before dissipating, killing 25. In 1998, an F5 tornado touched town in a rural area near Tuscaloosa before impacting Rock Creek, Sylvan Springs, Edgewater and McDonald Chapel, killing 32. The 2011 tornado was an EF4 that devastated Tuscaloosa and then struck Concord, Pleasant Grove, McDonald Chapel, northern Birmingham, and Fultondale before lifting, killing 64.

== See also ==
- List of F5 and EF5 tornadoes
- 1998 Oak Grove–Birmingham tornado
- List of North American tornadoes and tornado outbreaks
- Southern Airways Flight 242

== Sources ==
- Agee, Ernest M.; Childs, Samuel (June 1, 2014). "Adjustments in Tornado Counts, F-Scale Intensity, and Path Width for Assessing Significant Tornado Destruction". Journal of Applied Meteorology and Climatology. 53 (6). American Meteorological Society: 1494–1505. doi:10.1175/JAMC-D-13-0235.1.
- Brooks, Harold E. (April 2004). "On the Relationship of Tornado Path Length and Width to Intensity". Weather and Forecasting. 19 (2): 310–19. Bibcode:2004WtFor..19..310B. doi:10.1175/1520-0434(2004)019<0310:OTROTP>2.0.CO;2.
- Cook, A. R.; Schaefer, J. T. (August 2008). "The Relation of El Niño–Southern Oscillation (ENSO) to Winter Tornado Outbreaks". Monthly Weather Review. 136 (8): 3121–3137. Bibcode:2008MWRv..136.3121C. doi:10.1175/2007MWR2171.1.
- Edwards, Roger; LaDue, James G.; Ferree, John T.; Scharfenberg, Kevin; Maier, Chris; Coulbourne, William L. (May 1, 2013). "Tornado Intensity Estimation: Past, Present, and Future". Bulletin of the American Meteorological Society. 94 (5). American Meteorological Society: 641–653. doi:10.1175/BAMS-D-11-00006.1.
- Grazulis, Thomas P. (May 1984). Violent Tornado Climatography, 1880–1982. OSTI (Technical report). NUREG. Washington, D.C.: Nuclear Regulatory Commission. OSTI 7099491. CR-3670.
  - — (November 1990). Significant Tornadoes 1880–1989. Vol. 2. St. Johnsbury, Vermont: The Tornado Project of Environmental Films. ISBN 1-879362-02-3.
  - — (July 1993). Significant Tornadoes 1680–1991: A Chronology and Analysis of Events. St. Johnsbury, Vermont: The Tornado Project of Environmental Films. ISBN 1-879362-03-1.
  - — (2001a). The Tornado: Nature's Ultimate Windstorm. Norman: University of Oklahoma Press. ISBN 978-0-8061-3538-0.
  - — (2001b). F5-F6 Tornadoes. St. Johnsbury, Vermont: The Tornado Project of Environmental Films.
- National Weather Service (April 1977). "Storm Data and Unusual Weather Phenomena". Storm Data. 19 (4). Asheville, North Carolina: National Climatic Data Center.
- National Weather Service (April 1977). Storm Data Publication (Report). National Centers for Environmental Information – via Storm Events Database.
