= Annette Snell =

American R&B singer (1945–1977

- Also known as: Annetta
- Born: Annetta Snell; March 22, 1945; Sandersville, Georgia, U.S.
- Died: April 4, 1977 (aged 32) New Hope, Georgia, U.S.
- Genres: Soul, R&B
- Occupation: Singer
- Years active: 1963–1977
- Labels: Love Hill, Juggy, Dial, Epic

Annette Snell (March 22, 1945 – April 4, 1977) was an American R&B singer who recorded in the 1960s and 1970s. She was killed in the Southern Airways Flight 242 crash, at the age of 32.

== Biography ==
She was born Annetta Snell in Sandersville, Georgia, and in the early 1960s was a member of the vocal backing group, the Mar-Vells. She then became a member of the girl group the Fabulettes, who made several recordings in 1965 and 1966. In 1968, Snell left the group to go to New York, and then to Nashville, Tennessee, to pursue a solo career. Under the name Annetta, she recorded "Since There Is No More You" with Paul Kelly. Kelly then brought her to the attention of record producer and music publisher Buddy Killen. More singles came, all written by Kelly, and her greatest success was achieved with the No. 19 Billboard R&B hit "You Oughta' Be Here With Me" in 1973. She followed it up with two more R&B chart hits, also released on the Dial label, the following year, "Get Your Thing Together" (No. 44) and "Just as Hooked As I’ve Been" (No. 71).

Snell then won a deal to record an album for Epic Records in Muscle Shoals, Alabama with the session musicians known as the Swampers. They initially produced one unreleased single, "Promises Should Never Be Broken", and Snell returned for a further session in early 1977.

She was returning home via Atlanta after working on tracks for the album when her flight, Southern Airways Flight 242, crashed in New Hope, Georgia, during a severe thunderstorm on April 4, 1977, killing her at age 32. She was buried in Dade North Memorial Park Cemetery in Opa-locka, Florida.

Snell was married to Pete Jackson of Touch of Class.
