= Tornadoes of 1977 =

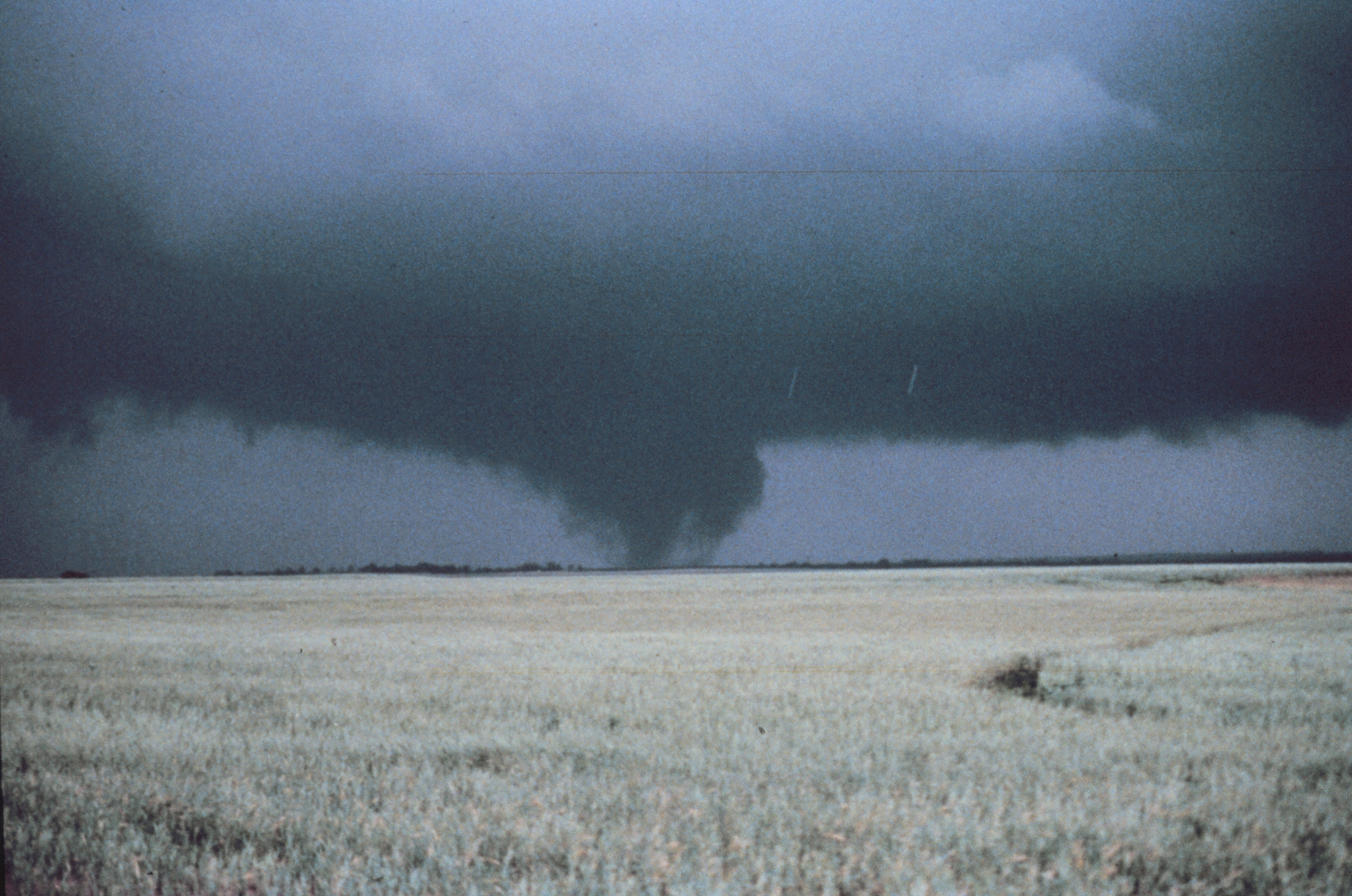
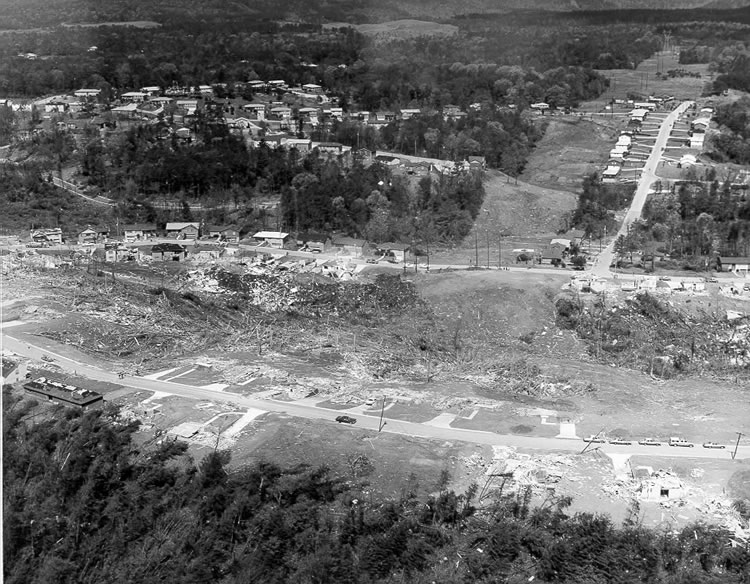
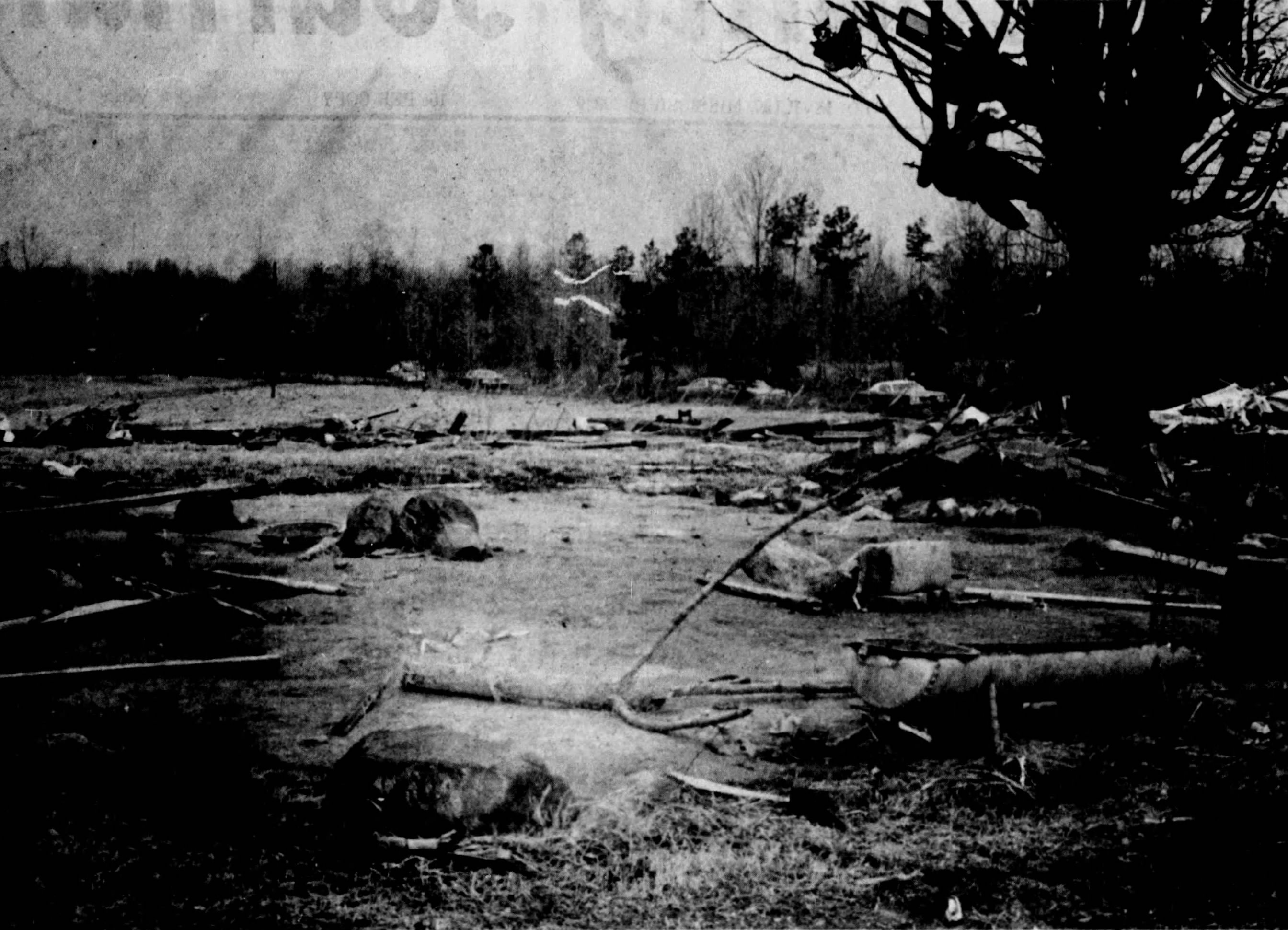
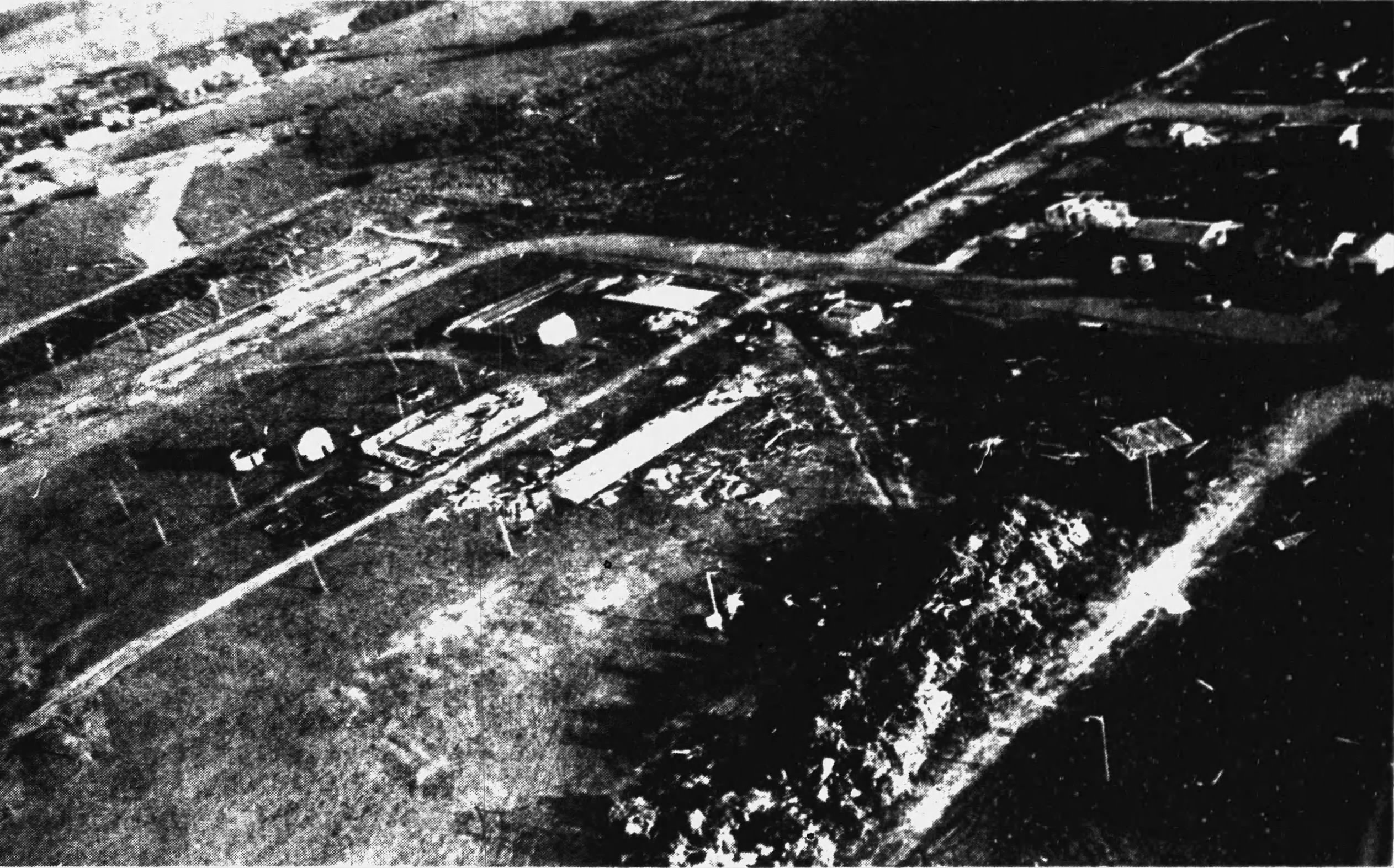
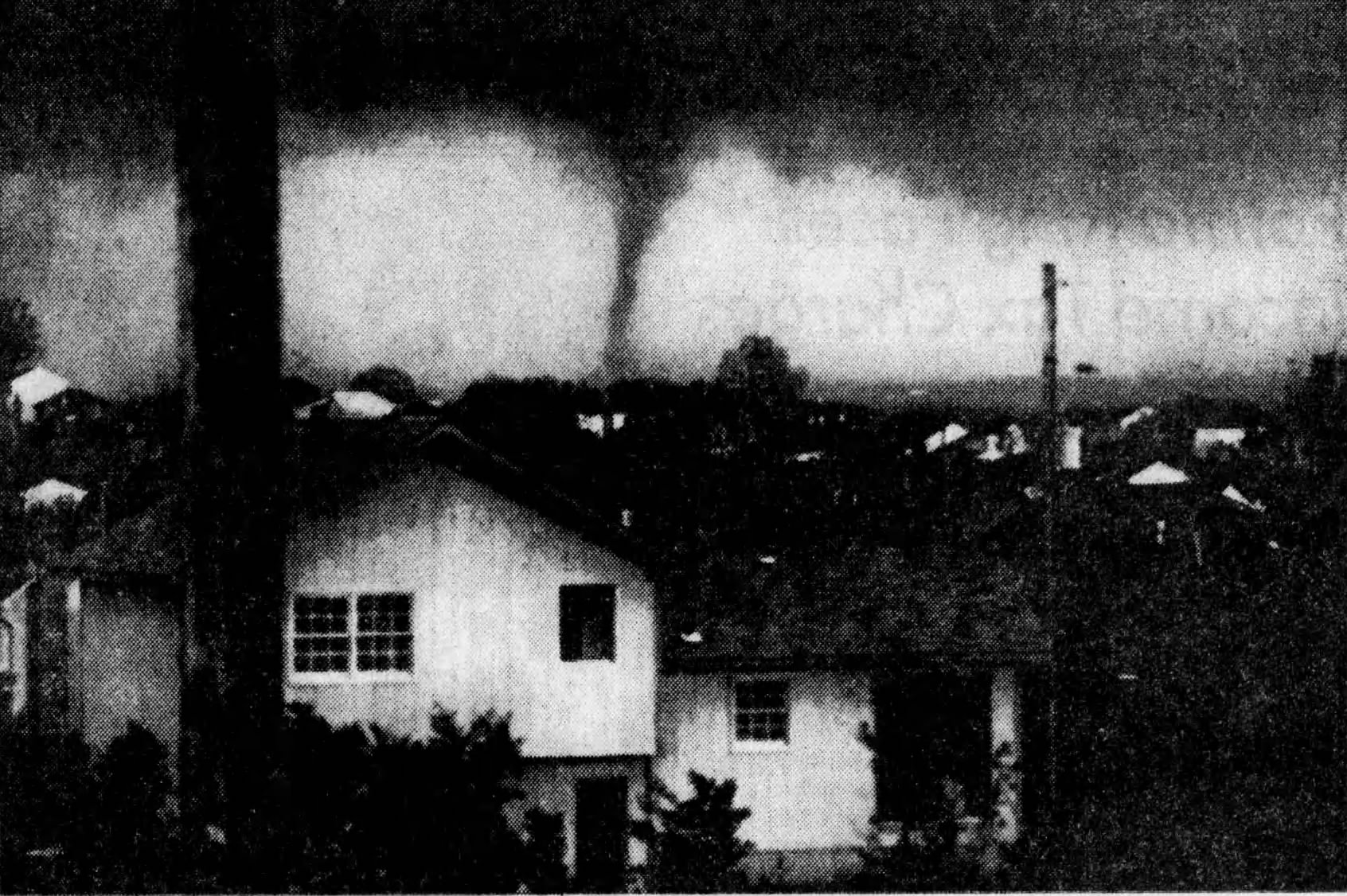
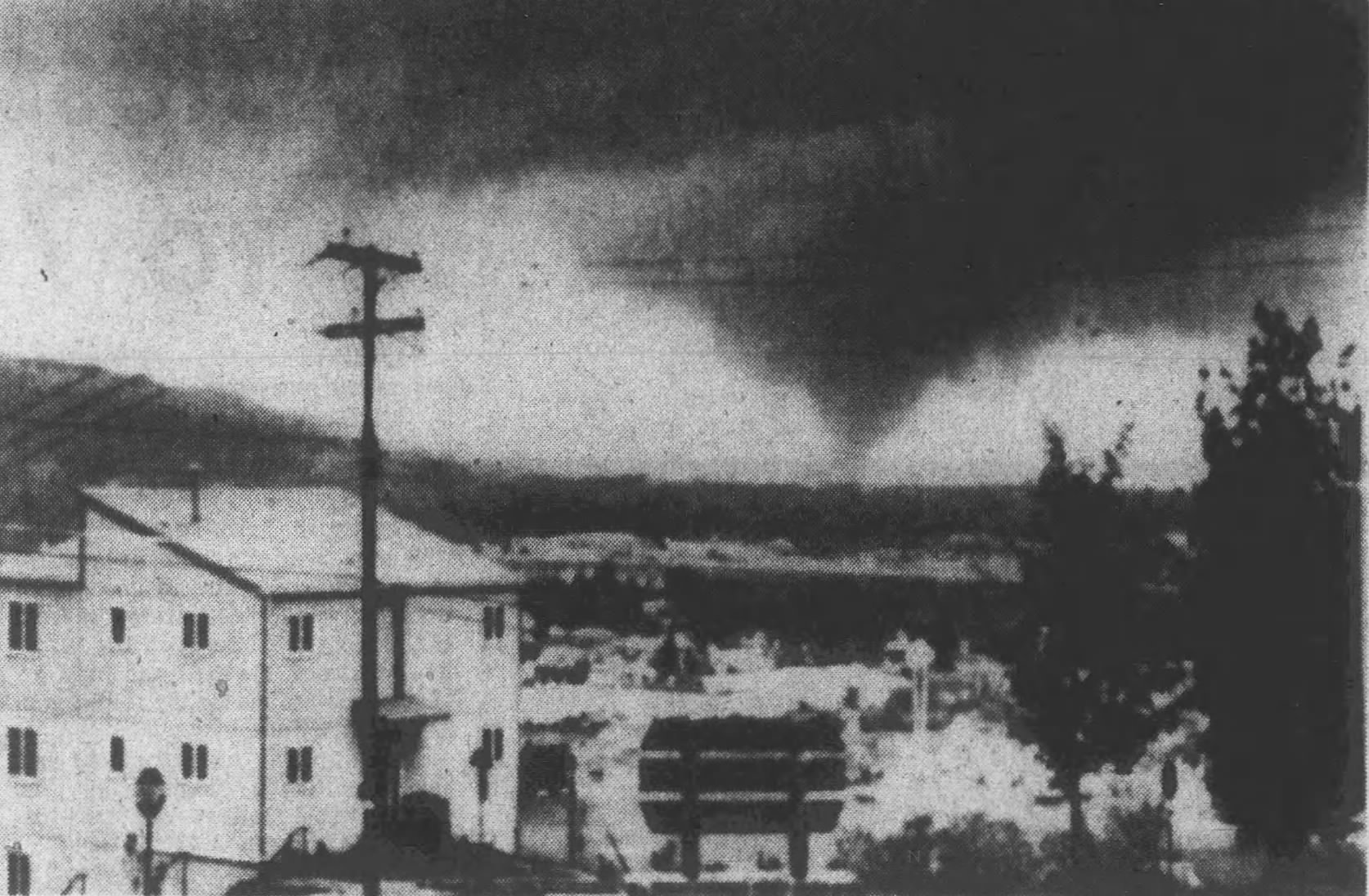
- Clockwise from top: A large F3 tornado near Mayfield, Oklahoma on May 16; The swept clean foundation of a large home near Louisville, Mississippi after an F4 tornado on February 23; An F3 tornado near Baldwin City, Kansas on May 4; A large F4 tornado approaching Wausau, Wisconsin on August 31; A fairgrounds in Bloomer, Wisconsin after an F4 tornado on July 30; F5 damage to well built homes in Birmingham, Alabama after a tornado on April 4.
- Timespan: January 3 - December 25, 1977
- Maximum rated tornado: F5 tornado: Birmingham, Alabama on April 4
- Tornadoes in U.S.: 680
- Damage (U.S.): Unknown
- Fatalities (U.S.): 43
- Fatalities (worldwide): >161

This page documents the tornadoes and tornado outbreaks of 1977, primarily in the United States. Most tornadoes form in the U.S., although some events may take place internationally. Tornado statistics for older years like this often appear significantly lower than modern years due to fewer reports or confirmed tornadoes.

== Synopsis ==
Fatal United States tornadoes in 1977
- Approximate touchdown location of killer tornadoes in 1977
Summary of tornadoes
- February 23 – Mississippi (2 deaths)
- April 2 – Michigan (1 death)
- April 4 – Alabama (1 death)
- April 4 – Alabama (22 deaths)
- April 4 – Georgia (1 death)
- April 21 – Louisiana (1 death)
- May 4 – Missouri (2 deaths)
- May 4 – Missouri (1 death)
- May 15 – Oklahoma (1 death)
- July 30 – Wisconsin (1 death)
- August 21 – Illinois (6 deaths)
- September 14 – Arkansas (1 death)
- October 1 – Indiana (1 death)
- December 5 – Florida (1 death)
- December 13 – Texas (1 death)
Total fatalities: 43

Numbers for 1977 were below average, both in terms of number of tornadoes and number of fatalities; however, there were over 700 injuries related to tornadoes.

== Events ==
Confirmed tornadoes by Fujita rating
FU	F0	F1	F2	F3	F4	F5	Total
0	166	332	135	37	9	1	680

== January ==
5 tornadoes were reported in the U.S. in January.

== February ==
17 tornadoes were reported in the U.S. in February.

== March ==
64 tornadoes were reported in the U.S. in March.

=== March 28 ===
FU	F0	F1	F2	F3	F4	F5
0	0	5	6	1	0	0

A small, widespread tornado outbreak caused an F2 tornado to strike the University of Southern Mississippi in Hattiesburg, Mississippi. Another F2 struck the downtown area of Lafayette, Louisiana. An F3 struck 5 to 10 houses northwest of Camden, Mississippi. Overall, there were only 10 injures, but no fatalities.

== April ==
88 tornadoes were reported in the U.S. in April.

=== April 4–5 ===
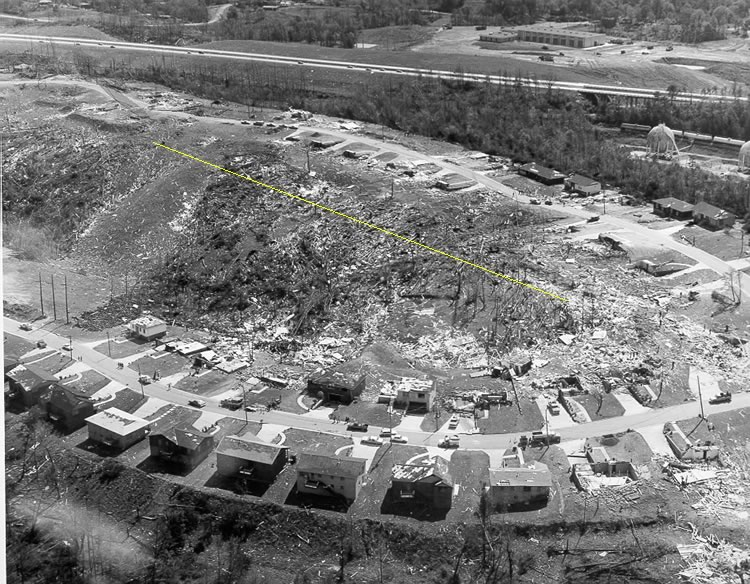
Birmingham, AL F5 tornado damage.

FU	F0	F1	F2	F3	F4	F5
0	1	9	6	4	0	1

A violent F5 tornado struck the Smithfield, Alabama area in Northern Birmingham, sweeping away many homes and killing 22 people. The damage in Birmingham was so severe that when Ted Fujita flew over the damage, he toyed with rating the tornado an F6. It was the most severe tornado of a large outbreak of 21 tornadoes that extended from Mississippi to North Carolina, with several strong tornadoes documented. An F3 tornado also struck the Lindale, Georgia area, where 12 trailers were completely swept away off their foundations, killing one person. The storm system also caused the crash of Southern Airways Flight 242 in Georgia, which killed 72 and injured 22.

=== April 16 (China) ===
Three separate tornadoes touched down in Xiaogan, Huangpi, and Huanggang in Hubei province, causing catastrophic damage and many fatalities. Along the tornados’ path, villages were allegedly “obliterated” and concrete structures were destroyed. Severe damage were observed in Huangpi, where fuel tanks weighing 2,500 kilograms (5,500 pounds) were picked up and thrown over 200 meters (219 yards). At least 103 deaths were attributed to the Huanggang tornado alone, which leveled a high school auditorium leading to the death of dozens of students inside, making it the second deadliest tornado recorded in China since 1950.

In total across Hubei, at least 118 deaths and over 1100 injuries were attributed to the tornadoes.

== May ==
228 tornadoes were reported in the U.S. in May.

=== May 4–5 ===
A low-pressure system swept across the Great Plains and Great Lakes regions, producing 3 F4 tornadoes: two in Missouri and one in Atlanta, Illinois. An F3 hit Harrisonville, Missouri. Overall, there were no fatalities, but several injuries.

=== May 16–21 ===
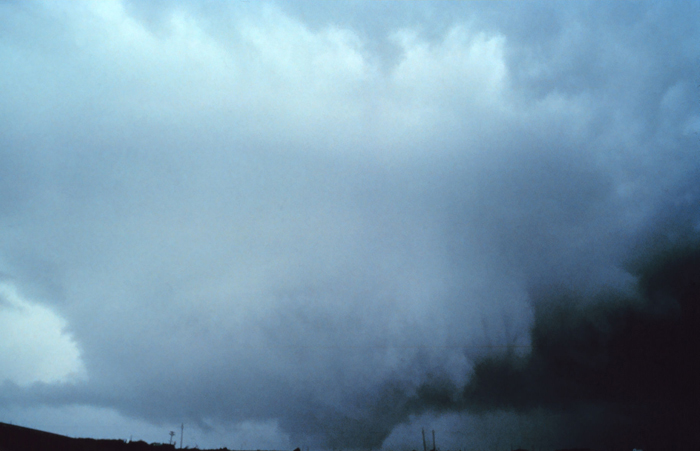
A large F3 tornado near Shamrock, Texas on May 16, 1977.

A very large tornado outbreak moved across Texas, Oklahoma, and Kansas. This outbreak included one of the strongest tornadoes ever in the Oklahoma Panhandle, a long track F4 tornado which struck the small town of Keyes, Oklahoma and tracked into Baca County, Colorado, where it dissipated. An F2 tornado touched down in Moore, Oklahoma and moved through Oklahoma City. An F3 touched down very close to the Altus, Oklahoma AFB. A long track F2 tornado touched down near Elkhart, Kansas before continuing striking the eastern fridges of Ulysses, Kansas damaging several farms before tracking into the east side of Garden City, Kansas where more damage was noted before dissipating in northern Finney County after traveling 117 miles though it may have been a tornado family.

== June ==
132 tornadoes were reported in the U.S. in June.

== July ==
99 tornadoes were reported in the U.S. in July.

=== July 10 (Serbia) ===
A violent tornado tore through the village of Negbina, Serbia (then Yugoslavia), destroying multiple homes, this tornado is unrated.

== August ==
82 tornadoes were reported in the U.S. in August.

=== August 21 ===
An F3 tornado killed 6 and injured 56 in Neoga, Illinois.

== September ==
65 tornadoes were reported in the U.S. in September.

== October ==
25 tornadoes were reported in the U.S. in October.

== November ==
24 tornadoes were reported in the U.S. in November.

== December ==
23 tornadoes were reported in the U.S. in December.

=== December 13 ===
An F3 tornado touched down in northeast Houston, Texas at 08:05 local time and was on the ground for 25 miles and was up to 1,000 yd (3,000 ft) wide at times as it traveled northeast, destroying 12 homes, 18 mobile homes, and 13 small businesses. The tornado also damaged 128 homes. One man died when his truck was blown off a road into woods as he was trying to outrun the tornado and forty people were injured. The tornado's funnel rarely touched the ground as damage to treetops was noted but no ground damage was noted at the same location.

== See also ==
- Tornado
  - Tornadoes by year
  - Tornado records
  - Tornado climatology
  - Tornado myths
- List of tornado outbreaks
  - List of F5 and EF5 tornadoes
  - List of North American tornadoes and tornado outbreaks
  - List of 21st-century Canadian tornadoes and tornado outbreaks
  - List of European tornadoes and tornado outbreaks
  - List of tornadoes and tornado outbreaks in Asia
  - List of Southern Hemisphere tornadoes and tornado outbreaks
  - List of tornadoes striking downtown areas
- Tornado intensity
  - Fujita scale
  - Enhanced Fujita scale
