= The Fabulettes =

The Fabulettes were a soul music girl group who formed in Florida in the early 1960s. Initially using the name The Mar-Vells, they performed live concerts and did session work for other Florida musicians as well as releasing two singles. Singer-songwriter Paul Kelly worked with them during their first years.

From 1963 until 1968, the line-up consisted of Annette Snell, Mattie Lovett, Addie Williams, and Loretta Ludlow.

Their name was changed to The Fabulettes for their first single on Monument Records, a move likely made by the record company to avoid confusion with other similarly named groups. This was followed in 1966 by two releases on soul label Sound Stage 7. When Snell left the group to pursue a solo career, The Fabulettes attempted to find a replacement, but split up after cutting two more records.

== Discography ==
=== Singles ===
The Mar-vells:

- "Go On And Have Yourself A Ball" / "How Do I Keep The Girls Away" (With D. Jones & The Continentals) (Butane 1963)
- "This Can't Go On" / "Dizzy Jones Birdland" (Yorey Records 1964)

The Fabulettes:

- "Mister Policeman" / "The Bigger They Are (The Harder They Fall)" (Monument Records 1965)
- "Try The Worryin' Way" / "Money" (Sound Stage 7 1966)
- "Screamin' And Shoutin'" / "I'm In The Mood For Love" (Sound Stage 7 1966)
- "Because Of Love" / "If The Morning Ever Comes" (Kangi Records 1969)
- "Muddy Waters" / "Stickin Kind Of Man" (Access Records Inc. 1971)
