= Southern Airways Flight 242 =

1977 aviation accident in Georgia, US

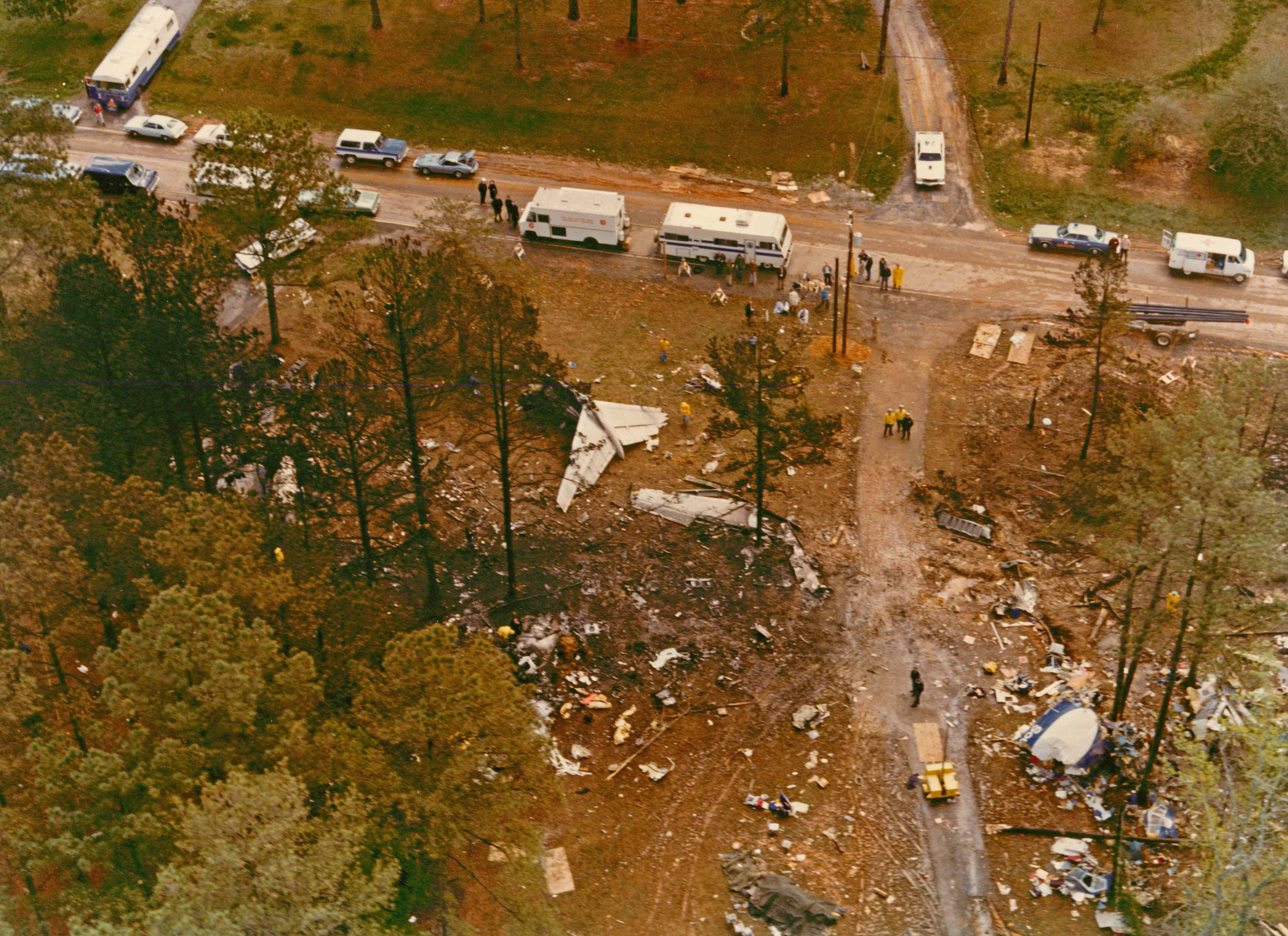
- Aerial view of the crash site

Accident
- Date: April 4, 1977
- Summary: Dual engine failure in bad weather
- Site: New Hope, Paulding County, Georgia, United States; 33°57′45″N 84°47′13″W
- Total fatalities: 72 (Note: The NTSB's final report lists a total of 70 fatalities from the crash of Flight 242, including 2 flight crew, 60 passengers, and 7 persons on the ground. However, two other persons (one passenger and one person on the ground) died about one month after the accident. In its final report, the NTSB explained that at the time, 49 CFR 830.2 required it to only identify persons who died within 7 days of an accident as having "fatal" injuries. In accordance with the regulation, the NTSB did not list these two deceased persons as fatalities, instead counting them as "serious" injuries.)
- Total injuries: 22

Aircraft
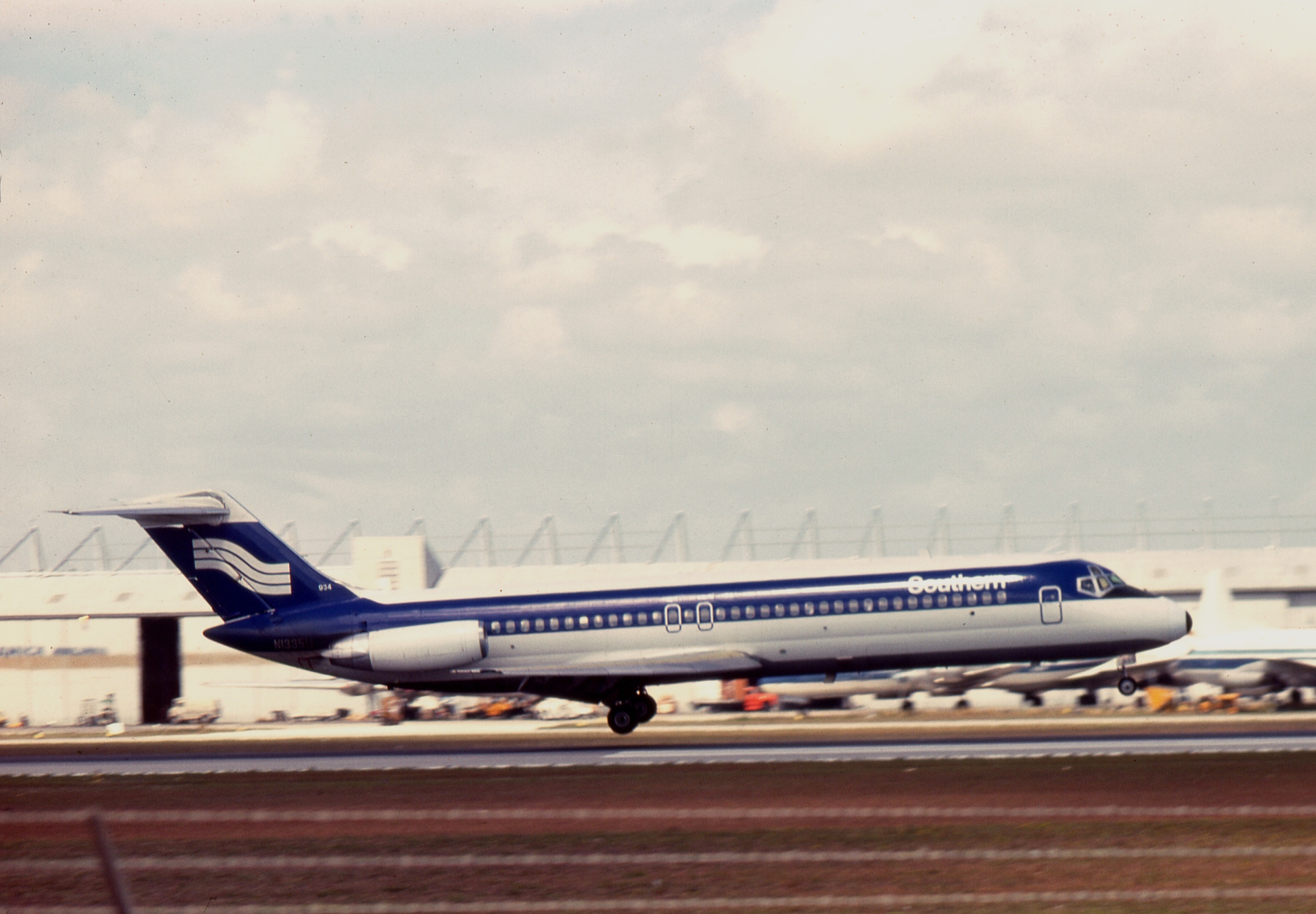
- N1335U, the aircraft involved in the accident
- Aircraft type: McDonnell Douglas DC-9-31
- Operator: Southern Airways
- IATA flight No.: SO242
- ICAO flight No.: SOU242
- Call sign: SOUTHERN 242
- Registration: N1335U
- Flight origin: Northwest Alabama Regional Airport, Muscle Shoals
- Stopover: Huntsville-Madison County Jetport
- Destination: Hartsfield Atlanta International Airport
- Occupants: 85
- Passengers: 81
- Crew: 4
- Fatalities: 63
- Injuries: 22
- Survivors: 22

Ground casualties
- Ground fatalities: 9

Southern Airways Flight 242 was a scheduled flight from Muscle Shoals, Alabama, to Atlanta, Georgia, with a stop in Huntsville, Alabama. On April 4, 1977, the Douglas DC-9-31 executed a forced landing on a spur route of Georgia State Route 92 in New Hope, Paulding County, Georgia, United States, after suffering hail damage and losing thrust on both engines in a severe thunderstorm.

At the time of the accident, the Southern Airways aircraft was flying from Huntsville-Madison County Jetport to Hartsfield Atlanta International Airport. Sixty-three people on the aircraft (including both pilots) and nine people on the ground died; twenty passengers survived, as well as two flight attendants. It remains the deadliest aviation accident to occur in the state of Georgia.

== Accident ==
The flight crew consisted of Captain William W. McKenzie (54), a highly experienced pilot with 19,380 flight hours, with 3,205 of them on the DC-9, first officer Lyman W. Keele Jr. (34), who had 3,878 flight hours, with 235 of them on the DC-9, and two flight attendants. The pilots were advised of the presence of embedded thunderstorms and possible tornadoes along their general route prior to their departure from Huntsville, but they were not subsequently told that the cells had since formed a squall line. The flight crew had flown through that same area from Atlanta earlier in the day, encountering only mild turbulence and light rain.

The weather system had greatly intensified in the meantime. The peak convective activity was later shown on ground radar to be near Rome, Georgia, to which the flight was cleared to proceed by air traffic control. The crew attempted to pick out a path through the cells using their on-board weather radar display, but they were apparently misled by the radar's attenuation effect, and they proceeded toward what they believed was a low-intensity area, when in fact it was the peak convective activity point, attenuated by rain.

As the aircraft descended from its cruising altitude of 17,000 to 14,000 feet (5,200 to 4,300 m) near Rome VOR, it apparently entered a thunderstorm cell and encountered a massive amount of rain and hail. The hail was so intense that it broke the aircraft's windshield. The Pratt & Whitney JT8D-7A engines ingested a massive amount of water and hail causing major damage to the compressors and flameout.

The crew attempted unsuccessfully to restart the engines, gliding down unpowered, while simultaneously trying to find an emergency landing field within range. Air traffic control suggested Dobbins Air Force Base, about 20 miles (17 nmi; 32 km) east, as a possible landing site, but it was beyond reach. Cartersville Airport, a general-aviation airport about 15 miles (13 nmi; 24 km) north with a much shorter runway intended for light aircraft was considered, but it was behind the aircraft and out of reach. Before the aircraft turned toward Dobbins, the closest airport was another general-aviation airport, Cornelius Moore Airport (now Polk County Airport – Cornelius Moore Field), but the air traffic controllers did not know about it (it was just outside their area of responsibility and not shown on their screens), and it was not considered.

As the aircraft ran out of altitude and options, gliding with a broken windshield and no engine power, the crew made visual contact with the ground and spotted a straight section of a rural highway below. They executed an unpowered forced landing on that road, but during the rollout, the aircraft's left wing collided with a gas station causing it to swerve to the left and crash into a wooded area. The pilots and 61 passengers were killed by impact forces and fire, but 22 of the passengers survived, as well as both flight attendants. Nine people on the ground were also killed, including a family of seven. Among the passengers killed was rhythm and blues singer Annette Snell.

== NTSB investigation and final report ==
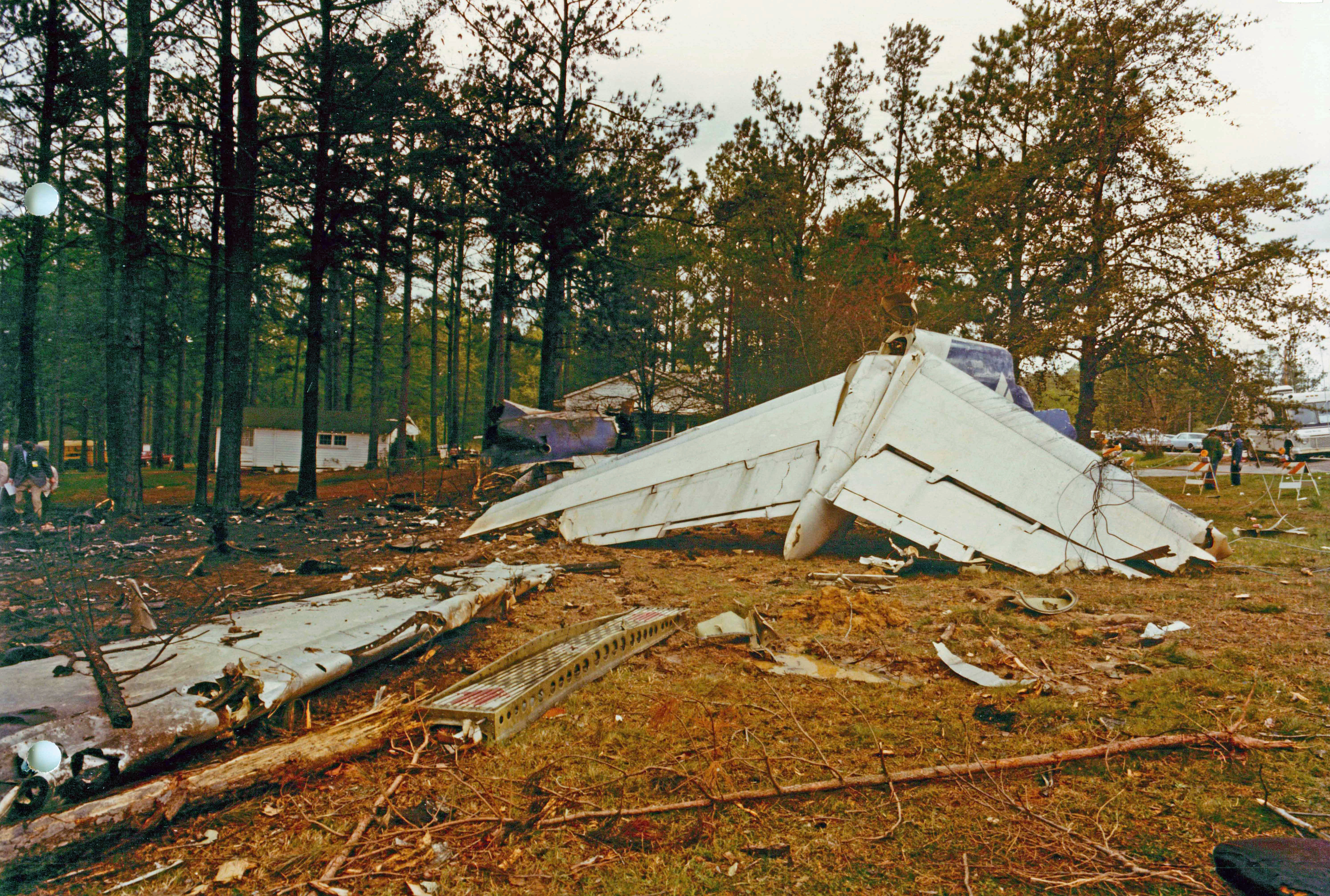
The wreckage of the tail section with the separated right wing in the foreground

The National Transportation Safety Board (NTSB) investigated the accident and concluded the following probable cause in its final report:

"The National Transportation Safety Board determines that the probable cause of this accident was the total and unique loss of thrust from both engines while the aircraft was penetrating an area of severe thunderstorms. The loss of thrust was caused by the ingestion of massive amounts of water and hail which in combination with thrust lever movement induced severe stalling in and major damage to the engine compressors."

The DC-9 broke into several large pieces; the cockpit had separated mostly intact and came to rest upside-down. Both pilots had been ejected from it, still strapped into their seats, and died of massive blunt-force injuries. The cockpit windows had separated and were mostly intact except for the two that had been struck by hail. No fire damage occurred to the fuselage until behind the wings, which area had been subjected to an intense conflagration, but most of the passenger section up to the wings had been demolished by impact forces. Some passengers were killed on impact, while others were ejected from the fuselage alive but injured. A number of other passengers succumbed to inhalation of smoke and fumes, including some who were unable to escape because of their injuries. Flight attendant Catherine Cooper survived unscathed because she was sitting in an area that provided her with relative protection from impact forces. She found herself hanging upside-down while still strapped into her seat, unbuckled the seatbelt, and jumped from an opening in the fuselage when the main cabin door turned out to be jammed and inoperable. Afterwards, Cooper ran to a nearby house to find help and discovered that some of the passengers were already there.

Meanwhile, flight attendant Sandy Ward was seated in the back of the plane and reported it "bouncing up and down" several times during impact and that fire spread through the cabin. With a wall of flames blocking the way in front, she moved rearwards and tried to open the back cabin door, but it was also jammed. By now, the fire had died down and she was able to exit through the broken fuselage. Ward tried to assist passengers in escaping until an explosion forced her to run for cover.

As per standard emergency procedure, the flight attendants removed their shoes and ordered passengers to do likewise. This policy was due to the possibility of high heels causing damage to evacuation slides. This resulted in a number of people sustaining lacerations and bruises to their feet that would have been unlikely to have occurred otherwise, but since the attendants did not know the exact circumstances of the crash, they simply followed by-the-book emergency directions. The NTSB believed that the pilots should have informed the flight attendants and crew to cushion themselves with blankets, coats, and pillows, and not remove their shoes.

The cockpit voice recorder (CVR) data indicated at least two interruptions to power, one lasting for 15 seconds and the other almost 2 minutes following the complete loss of engine thrust until the crew switched to backup battery power. The best chance for a (reasonably) safe landing would have been at Dobbins Air Force Base in Marietta, Georgia, but why the crew did not attempt it is unclear because of the two-minute gap in CVR data. Lacking CVR data, the NTSB concluded that it was most likely that the pilots turned away from Dobbins for a combination of poor visibility and loss of electrical power, forcing the crew to turn the plane so they could maintain visual flight conditions.

The NTSB also included these contributing factors:

"the failure of the company's dispatching system to provide the flight crew with up-to-date severe weather information pertaining to the aircraft's intended route of flight, the captain's reliance on airborne weather radar for penetration of thunderstorm areas, and limitations in the Federal Aviation Administration's air traffic control system, which precluded the timely dissemination of real-time hazardous weather information to the flight crew."

Moreover, the crew had no training for a situation that involved total loss of engine thrust, nor did Southern Airways require such training. FAA regulations had no such requirement either, because the possibility of complete failure of all engines on a jet-powered carrier aircraft was deemed so remote as to not require training or special procedures; the NTSB could not find a recorded instance prior to Flight 242 of a commercial jet aircraft experiencing such an emergency. (While other significant incidents involving loss of all engines in flight have occurred, including the Gimli Glider, Scandinavian Airlines Flight 751, and the Miracle on the Hudson, these happened after Flight 242's unpowered landing event in 1977.)

=== Concurring and dissenting opinions ===
Three of the NTSB's four board members signed the final report. Kay Bailey, who signed the final report, added a concurring opinion, which reiterated the board's previous recommendations for improved real-time weather dissemination.

Francis H. McAdams, one of the four NTSB members, dissented from the other members. In his dissenting opinion, McAdams provided his alternate view:

"the probable cause of this accident was the captain's decision to penetrate rather than avoid an area of severe weather, the failure to obtain all the available weather information despite having knowledge of the severity of the storm system, and the reliance upon airborne weather radar for penetration rather than avoidance of the storm system. The penetration resulted in a total loss of thrust from both engines due to the ingestion of massive amounts of water and hail, which in combination with advanced throttle settings, induced severe stalling in, and major damage to, the engine compressors, which prevented the crew from restarting the engines. Furthermore, if the company's dispatching system had provided the flight crew with timely severe weather information pertaining to the aircraft's intended route of flight, it is possible that the severe weather would not have been penetrated."

McAdams also wrote in his dissent that he would add, as a contributing factor, the "inadequacies of the Federal Aviation Administration's air traffic control system, which precluded the dissemination of real-time hazardous weather information to the flight crew."

== Flight attendants' commendation ==
The flight attendants on board were Catherine Lemoine–Cooper (July 18, 1950 – June 12, 2020) as senior flight attendant, and Sandy Purl Ward (born February 23, 1953), second flight attendant.

The NTSB noted in its report that despite the fact that the flight crew did not communicate with the cabin crew during the emergency sequence, the flight attendants on their own initiative briefed and prepared the passengers for an emergency landing as the plane glided down. Just prior to touchdown, with no prior notice or cue from the flight crew that the plane was about to crash land, the flight attendants "saw trees" in the windows, and immediately yelled to the passengers a final "brace for impact!" command. The flight attendants also helped evacuate the passengers from the burning plane after the crash landing. The NTSB concluded:

"The flight attendants acted commendably for initiating a comprehensive emergency briefing of the passengers for their protection in preparation for a crash landing. This contributed to the number of survivors."

Purl wrote the book Am I Alive? about the experience, and is a motivational speaker. In her book, she tells the story of the crash and the history of critical incident stress management's entry into the aviation industry. Purl retired from Northwest in 1994.

== Accident location ==
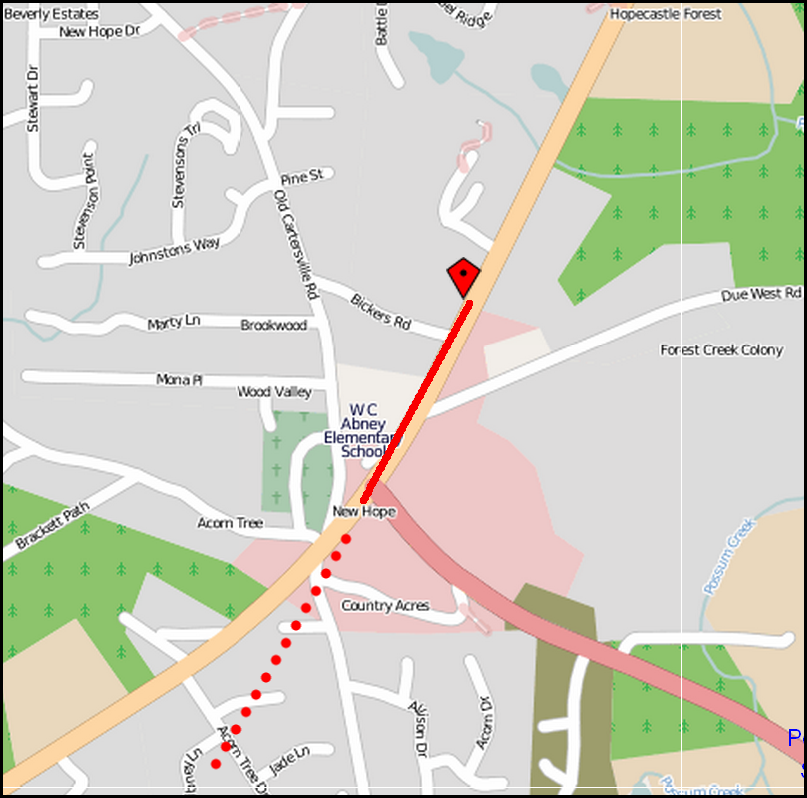
Approximate approach (dotted line), touchdown and rollout (solid line) of SA flight 242

The NTSB identified the accident site in its report as "Highway 92 Spur, bisecting New Hope, GA", and also included the geographical coordinates. In addition, the NTSB report includes a depiction of the accident site, hand-drawn as a circled "X" on an aviation sectional chart.

The designation this highway has changed in the years since the crash. In 1979, Georgia State Route 92 Spur was renumbered to Georgia State Route 381. Route 381 was decommissioned as a numbered state highway between 1990 and 1991. As of 2026, the road section through New Hope used for the forced landing is signed as Dallas–Acworth Highway.

== Memorials ==
The small Georgia community of New Hope, in Paulding County, where a memorial and reunion were held by survivors and family members 20 years after the accident in 1997, now hosts a memorial and reunion annually near the crash site. The site is 11 miles (18 km) from Cartersville Airport and 15.5 miles (25 km) from Dobbins AFB. Cornelius Moore Field, between Cedartown and Rockmart, was about 20.5 miles (33 km) behind them at the time of the crash.

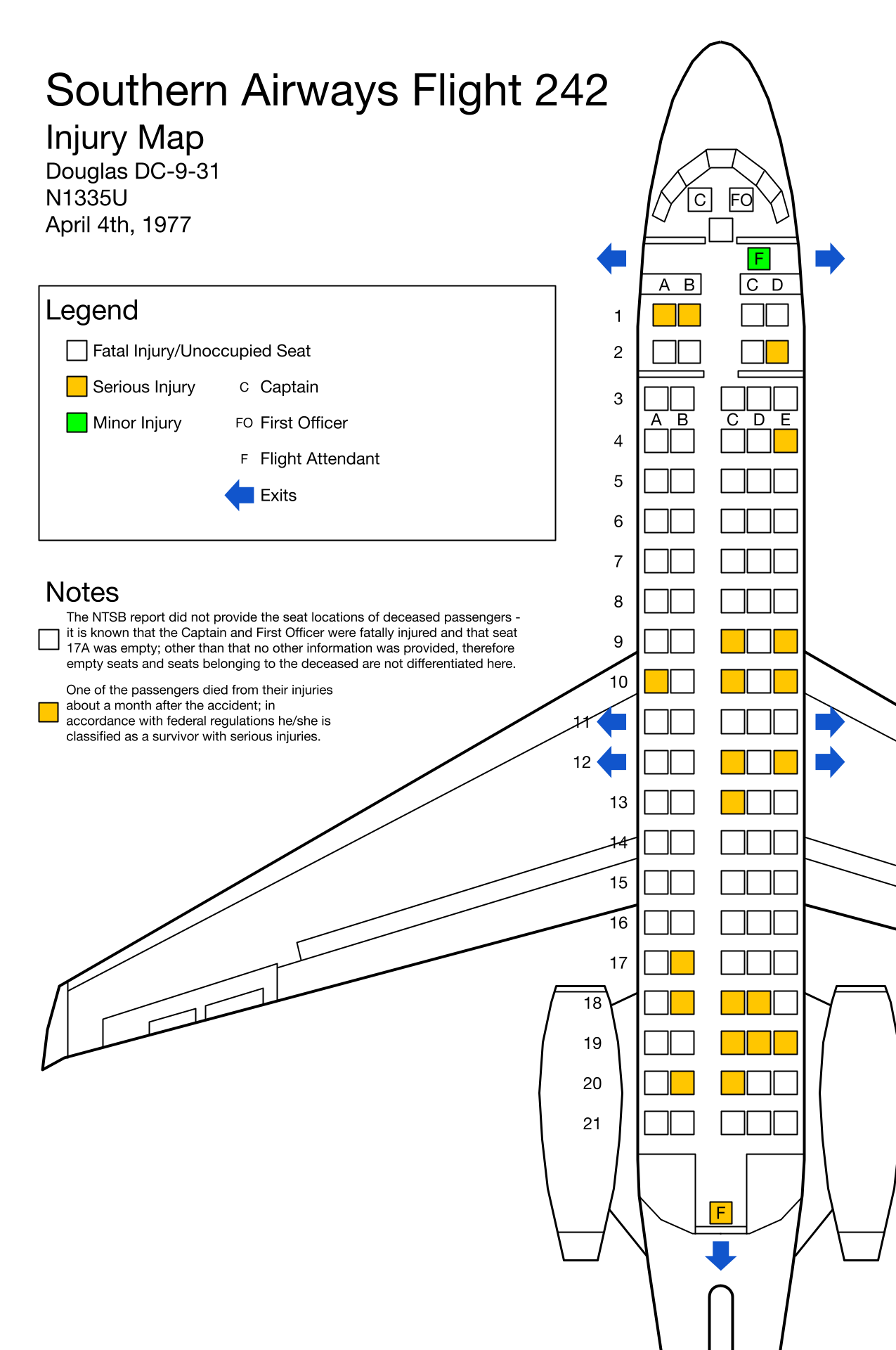
Injury map of Southern Airways Flight 242

Local residents and victims' families formed the nonprofit New Hope Memorial Flight 242, Inc., to provide "an annual memorial service, survivor's reunion and a monument." New Hope Memorial installed a Georgia state historical marker at the southwest corner of the New Hope Cemetery, located about a half mile southwest of the crash site.

The text of the marker states:

"April 4, 1977 The Worst Aircraft Disaster in Georgia History
On April 4, 1977, a DC-9 Southern Airways Flight 242 flying from Huntsville, AL, to Atlanta encountered a dangerous thunderstorm over Rome, GA. The hail and rain the aircraft endured was so severe that both engines flamed out and the aircraft quickly lost altitude. The flight crew desperately attempted to land the DC-9 on GA 92 Spur, now known as GA 381, which runs through the community of New Hope. The result was the worst aircraft disaster in GA history, claiming 72 lives including 9 local residents of New Hope. Miraculously, 22 passengers survived."

New Hope resident fatalities included Kathy Griffin Carter and son Jeffrey Richard Carter, Faye Robinson Griffin and son Larry Allen Griffin, Edna Griffin Gamel, son John T. Gamel and daughter Courtney A. Gamel, Berlie Mae Bell Cranton, and Ernest L. Prewett.

In March 2015, the organization announced plans to build a permanent memorial to honor the victims of the crash. In March 2019, the group announced that sufficient funds had been raised for a larger memorial. On April 4, 2021, the memorial was dedicated on the tragedy's 44th anniversary with nearly 100 in attendance including survivors and family members spanning four states.

== Cultural references ==
The Discovery Channel Canada / National Geographic TV series Mayday depicted the accident in a 2007 episode titled "Southern Storm". The episode featured interviews with witnesses and accident investigators, and a dramatization of the accident.

The Weather Channel featured the crash in an episode of its TV series Why Planes Crash.

== See also ==
- Tornado outbreak of April 1977 – the storm system responsible for bringing down the flight
- NLM CityHopper Flight 431 - Another flight that crashed as a result of a tornado
- Garuda Indonesia Flight 421 – lost power in both engines shortly after entering a hail storm
- TACA Flight 110 – 737 that lost thrust in a similar incident
- West Caribbean Airways Flight 708 - an MD-82 the crash killed 160 passengers and crew involving severe thunderstorms and engine flame out
- Air Wisconsin Flight 965 - an accident where a turboprop suffered dual engine failure due to poor weather.
- Southern Airways Flight 932 – the only other fatal Southern Airways accident
- List of airline flights that required gliding
