= New Hope, Paulding County, Georgia =

Unincorporated community in Georgia, U.S.

Coordinates: 33°57′30.8″N 84°47′21″W

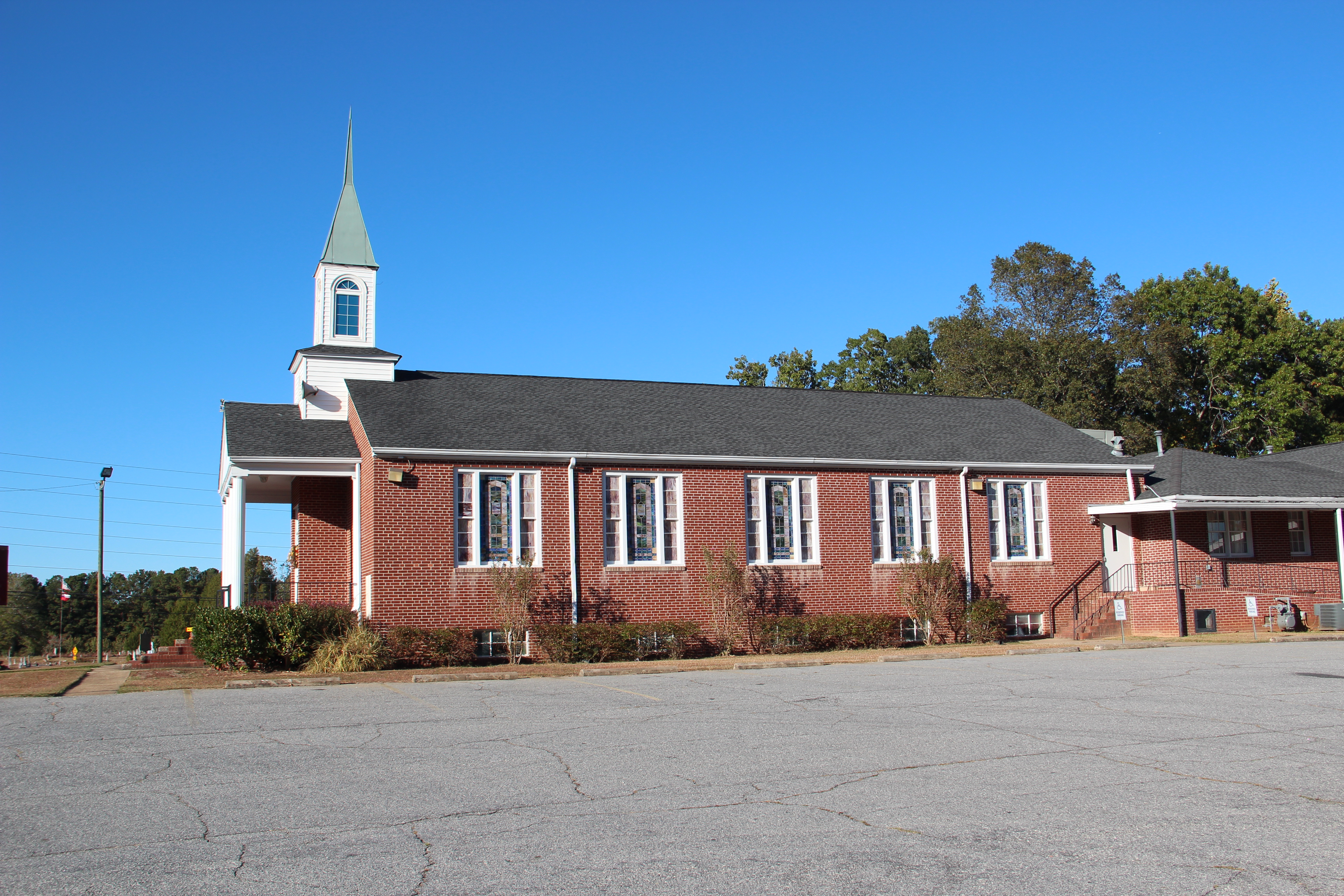
New Hope First Baptist Church

New Hope's approximate location in Georgia

New Hope is an unincorporated community in Paulding County, Georgia, United States.

== History ==
Once considered a rural destination, New Hope is now an exurb of Atlanta, located at the crossroads of Dallas-Acworth Highway and East Paulding Drive/Old Cartersville Road.

The community began to develop in the late 1990s and flourished in the early 2000s, especially with the development of the Riverwood, Bentwater, and SevenHills communities. As one of the fastest-growing communities in one of the nation's fastest-growing counties, New Hope was hit hard by the housing bust of the late 2000s. As a result, lots once slated for half-million dollar homes were vacant, newly paved streets had no destination, and newly built homes remained unsold and shuttered. However, by 2021 such housing had recovered.

New Hope is within zip code 30132, a part of Dallas.

The Battle of New Hope Church, one of the last battles before Sherman's campaign reached Atlanta during the American Civil War, took place in this area.

On April 4, 1977, Southern Airways Flight 242 crashed near New Hope, killing 72 people after making an emergency landing on Georgia State Route 381, Dallas-Acworth Highway. The Douglas DC-9 was damaged from a severe thunderstorm. Every ten years since, the survivors have attended a ceremony in remembrance of the victims of the crash. It is the largest survivors' group of its kind.
