= Lowry Bridge (disambiguation) =

Lowry Bridge may refer to:

- Lowry Avenue Bridge, steel tied-arch bridge over the Mississippi River in Minneapolis, Minnesota.
- Lowry Bridge, Georgia, wooden town lattice covered bridge crossing Euharlee Creek in Euharlee, Georgia.
