= James Johnson (Georgia politician) =

American politician (1811–1891)

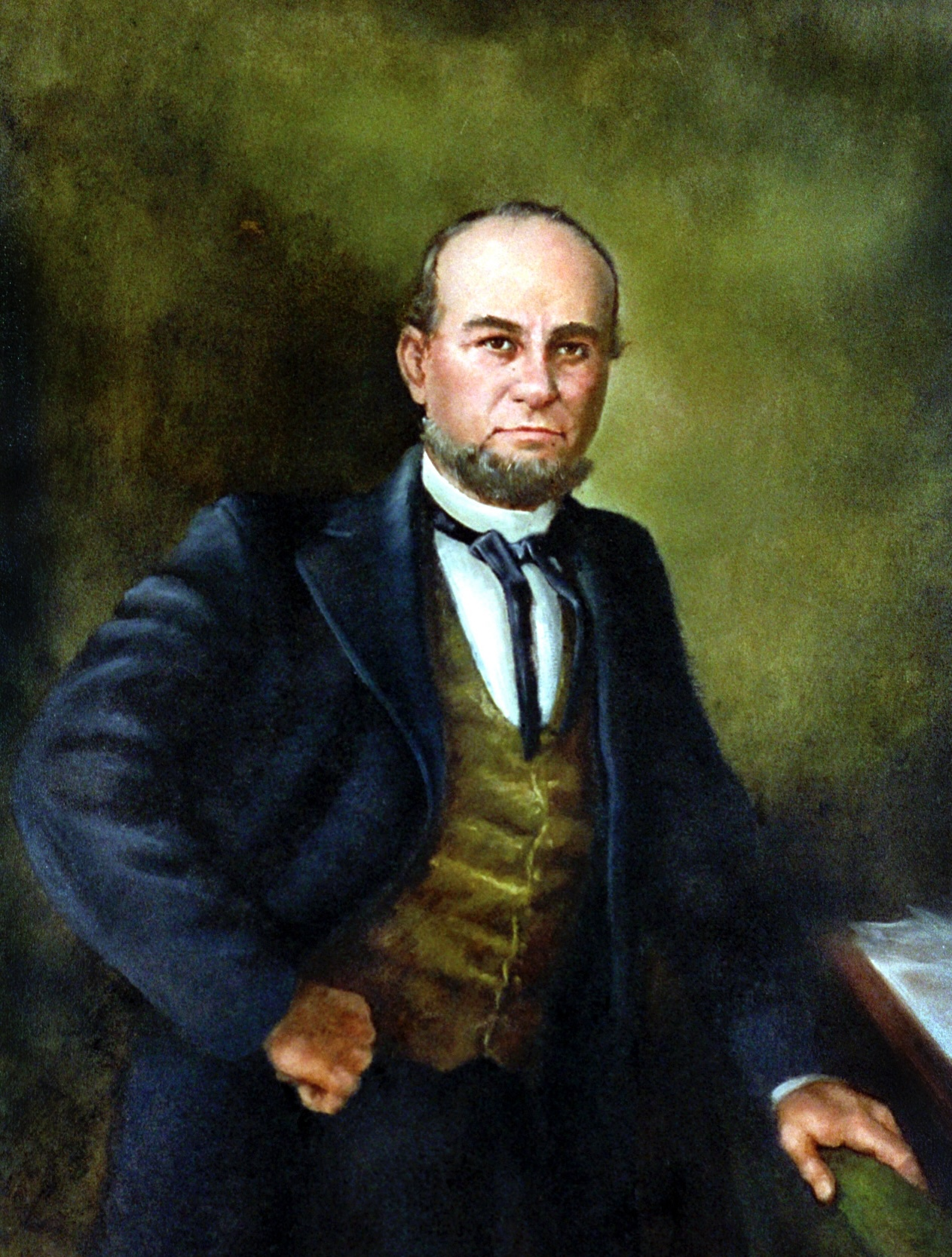

43rd Governor of Georgia
- In office June 17, 1865 – December 14, 1865
- Preceded by: Joseph E. Brown
- Succeeded by: Charles J. Jenkins

Member of the U.S. House of Representatives from Georgia's 2nd district
- In office March 4, 1851 – March 3, 1853
- Preceded by: Marshall J. Wellborn
- Succeeded by: Alfred H. Colquitt

Personal details
- Born: February 12, 1811 Robeson County, North Carolina
- Died: November 20, 1891 (aged 80) Chattahoochee County, Georgia
- Resting place: Linwood Cemetery, Columbus, Georgia
- Party: Democratic
- Education: University of Georgia
- Profession: Law

James Johnson (February 12, 1811 – November 20, 1891) was a U.S. representative from Georgia and served as the 43rd governor of Georgia between June and October 1865.

== Early life ==
Johnson was born in 1811 in Robeson County, North Carolina to Peter and Nancy McNeill Johnson, whose parents had come from Scotland. The Johnsons moved from North Carolina to Henry County, Georgia, the newly created county by the Georgia General Assembly's Land Lottery Act of 1821 from previously Indian-held territory between the Ocmulgee and Flint rivers. He graduated from Franklin College (the predecessor of the University of Georgia) in 1832 with his classmates Alexander H. Stephens, Crawford W. Long, and William H. Crawford. He married Ann Harris of Jones County on June 12, 1834. They moved to Columbus, Georgia where he started his law practice after passing the bar in 1835. In 1845, Johnson and a fellow member of the Columbus bar, Henry L. Benning (namesake of Ft. Benning) memorialized General Andrew Jackson.

== Political life ==
In 1851, Johnson was elected to the United States House of Representatives as a Unionist. Some historians labeled him a Whig, but in the later 1850s, he was a member of the American, or Know-Nothing, party. He was defeated in his re-election bid by Alfred H. Colquitt in 1853. Johnson opposed secession, and historians agree that he kept a low profile during the Civil War.

Johnson was appointed as provisional Governor of Georgia on June 17, 1865, by U.S. President Andrew Johnson (unrelated), and tasked primarily with reorganizing the state government, which had collapsed with the Confederacy. He served until a constitutional convention was held in Milledgeville in October 1865; at that convention, the Secession Ordinance was repealed, a new constitution was adopted, and the State's war debt was repudiated. He unsuccessfully ran for the U.S. Senate, but on January 30, 1866, the legislature preferred Alexander H. Stephens and Herschel V. Johnson.

== Postbellum life ==
For his service, President Johnson gave James Johnson the position as collector of customs for the Port of Savannah. He served in this capacity from October 1, 1866, to May 31, 1869. Johnson moved back to Columbus, where he served as judge of the Superior Court from July 1, 1869, to Oct. 1, 1875, when he resigned.

== Death and legacy ==
He died in 1891 in Chattahoochee County, Georgia. He is buried in Linwood Cemetery (Columbus, Georgia).

U.S. House of Representatives
Preceded by Marshall J. Wellborn	U.S. Representative from the 2nd district of Georgia; 1851–1853	Succeeded by Alfred H. Colquitt
Political offices
Preceded by Joseph E. Brown	Governor of Georgia; 1865	Succeeded by Charles J. Jenkins
