= Seaborn Jones Memorial Park =

Park in Georgia, United States

Coordinates: 34.00243°N 85.03945°W

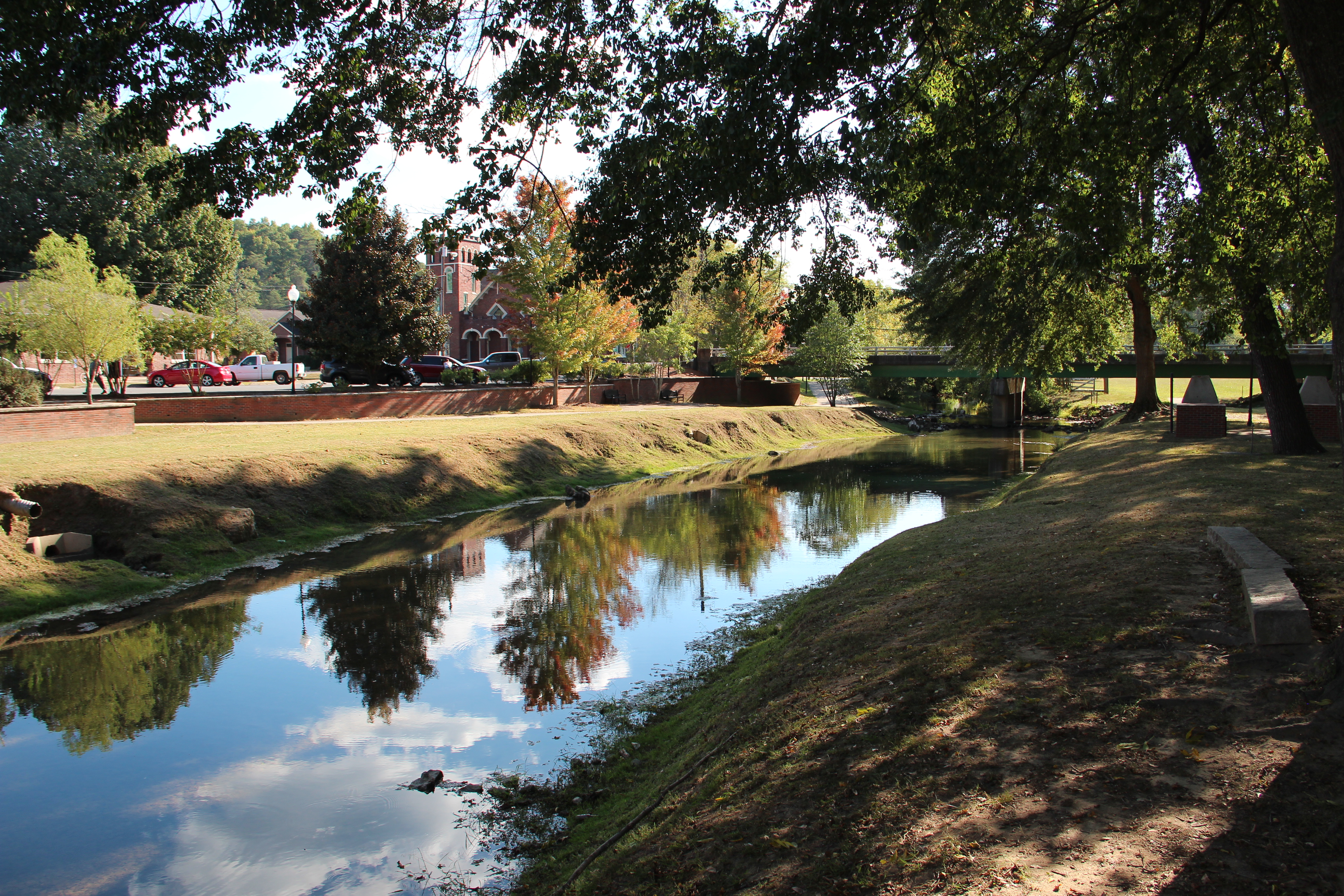
Euharlee Creek in Seaborn Jones Memorial Park

The Seaborn Jones Memorial Park, formerly known as Wayside Park, was renamed in 2002 after Seaborn Jones because of his generosity and other significant contributions that he made to the city. The park sits in the middle of the Historical Downtown district of the City of Rockmart, Georgia along the banks of the Euharlee Creek. The name Euharlee comes from the Cherokee or Creek Indians and means "she laughs as she runs."

== Park features ==
The main attractions to the park are the Euharlee Creek and the Silver Comet Trail which both run through the park. The latest attraction to the area is the "Silver Comet Depot" which is a community building that is adjacent to the park and the Silver Comet Trail. This building is available to rent for family gatherings, receptions, and other special events.

== The Homespun Festival ==
On the third weekend of July, Rockmart host a special event called the Homespun Festival. This is a two-day event of live entertainment, arts, crafts, homemade foods, car shows and other events. Friday night features Southern Gospel Music and Saturday includes a 5-K Road Race, the annual parade and fireworks.

== Rockmart in film ==
The "Fish Fry" scene from the movie Irresistible was filmed in the park. Downtown Rockmart was the location of the fictional Deerlaken, Wisconsin.
