= List of killings by law enforcement officers in the United States, February 2014 =

This is a list of people reported killed by non-military law enforcement officers in the United States in February 2014, whether in the line of duty or not, and regardless of reason or method. The listing documents the occurrence of a death, making no implications regarding wrongdoing or justification on the part of the person killed or officer involved. Killings are arranged by date of the incident that caused death. Different death dates, if known, are noted in the description. The table below lists 64 people.

== February 2014 ==
Date	Name (Age) of Deceased	Race	State (City)	Description
2014-02-28	Marquise Jones (23)	Black	San Antonio, Texas	Officer Robert Encina was working private duty (in full uniform) at a restaurant when he approached the drive-through because of an alleged disturbance between two vehicles. Jones was a passenger in one of the vehicles. Police say that Jones got out of the vehicle and displayed a gun, prompting Encina to shoot him multiple times in the torso. Witnesses and family contest this in a lawsuit, claiming Jones did not display a gun and was shot in the back as he tried to leave.
2014-02-28	Robert Striffler (51)	White	Brevard County, Florida	Robert Striffler was fatally shot by Juan Vargas and Chris Neel of the Brevard County Sheriff's Office after a three-hour stand off prompted by Striffler appearing at the county court house brandishing a toy air soft pistol. Striffler was shot after he attempted to pull his realistic looking air soft gun while being confronted by the SWAT team. The orange safety cap had been removed from his air soft gun.
2014-02-28	Maykel Antonio Barrera (37)	Hispanic	Miami, Florida	
2014-02-27	Treon "Tree" Johnson (27)	Black	Hialeah, Florida	
2014-02-27	Brischetto, Damon (29)		St. Louis County, Missouri	An officer spotted Brischetto speeding early on February 27. The car had crashed into a guardrail and burst into flames. Police could see two women inside the car and wanted to help get them out. As officers tried to find a fire extinguisher, a Woodson Terrace officer saw a man inside the burning car holding a gun, police say. Brischetto fired shots, and the officers returned fire. The two women survived the crash. One of the women got out on her own. Police pulled the other woman to safety from the back seat. She suffered severe burns. Neither woman is being charged with any crime in connection to the incident. Police have not identified either woman.
2014-02-26	Ye Hua Jian (32)	Asian	Norwalk, Connecticut	
2014-02-26	John Edward Chesney (62)	White	San Diego, California	
2014-02-26	Vanessa Pitofsky (42)	White	Dallas, Texas	
2014-02-26	Scott Islam (33)	White	Danville, Illinois	
2014-02-26	Del Aukerman (57)	White	Shelbyville, Kentucky	
2014-02-25	Billie Joe Woolford (48)	Unknown race	Ecorse, Michigan	
2014-02-25	Harold Lynn Phelps (57)	White	Mesa, Arizona	
2014-02-24	Gregory Sanders (37)	Black	Cincinnati, Ohio	
2014-02-23	Joseph Ma (18)	Asian	Fresno, California	Ma ran from a vehicle stopped by Fresno Police about 5:30 PM. As he ran into an apartment complex in Southwest Fresno, police officers saw Ma was carrying a handgun. One of the officers chased the suspect and fired at Ma, killing him.
2014-02-22	Armando Alvarez (44)	Hispanic	Tucson, Arizona	Alvarez tried to get away on a bike after robbing the Chase Bank near Broadway and Wilmot. He was found nearby, hiding in a homeowner's shed. When he came out, officers noticed he had an object in his hand and refused to drop it, according to a news release. All three officers shot at Alvarez and he was later pronounced dead.
2014-02-21	Antonio Guzman Lopez (38)	Hispanic	San Jose, California	Lopez was walking away from police officers while armed with a twelve-inch cutting saw in his hand, near a college campus, A San Jose State University Police officer fired two shots in Lopez's back, killing him. In May 2014, Santa Clara County prosecutors cleared the officer in Lopez's death. The shooting, caught on film, shows Lopez walking away from the officer although police claimed Lopez was charging towards them. Lopez's family has filed a lawsuit against the department and city.
2014-02-20	James Marlowe Ness (70)	Unknown race	Browning, Montana	
2014-02-18	Jesus Flores-Cruz (42)	Hispanic	San Diego, California	
2014-02-18	Randy Ray Vinson (37)	White	Kilgore, Texas	
2014-02-18	David Goins (60)	Black	San Lorenzo, California	
2014-02-17	John E. Brown II (44)	White	Hammond, Indiana	
2014-02-17	Oscar Gaspar (17)	Black	Houston, Texas	
2014-02-16	Keith Atkinson (31)	Black	New Orleans, Louisiana	
2014-02-16	Timothy Oakes (47)	White	Orlando, Florida	
2014-02-16	Yvette Smith (47)	Black	Bastrop, Texas	
2014-02-16	Riley Leif Ottersen (34)	White	Mukilteo, Washington	
2014-02-15	Jeffrey M. Harris (45)	White	Auburn, New York	
2014-02-15	Bernard Lofton (22)	Black	Baltimore, Maryland	
2014-02-15	Luis Antonio Elena Rodriguez (44)	Hispanic	Moore, Oklahoma	Police responded after Rodriguez' wife and daughter had an argument in the parking lot of the Warren Theater. After Rodriguez refused to show police his identification, they attempted to arrest him and Rodriguez resisted. Two on-duty Moore officers, one off-duty officer and two off-duty state game wardens were present during the altercation. Rodriguez stopped breathing during the beating and paramedics were unable to revive him. "When they flipped him over you could see all the blood on his face, he was disfigured, you couldn't recognize him," his daughter told journalists.
2014-02-15	Brandon Keeler (18)	White	Hamilton, Ohio	Neighbors said Brandon Keeler, 18, was walking around with an AK-47 shooting it into the air. Keeler was also armed with a handgun.
2014-02-14	Christopher Roupe (17)	White	Euharlee, Georgia	A 17-year-old male, Christopher Roupe, was fatally shot in the chest by officer Nancy Beth Gatny when he opened the door of his home while holding a Wii remote that officers mistook for a gun. Gatny came to the house to serve a warrant for Roupe's father, who was on probation. The officer told the Georgia Bureau of Investigation that Roupe pointed a gun at her as he opened the door. A first Cherokee Judicial Circuit Grand Jury found Gatny not authorized to shoot a 17-year-old while responding to a call in February and recommended that the DA’s office take further action in the case. A second Grand Jury The Cherokee Judicial Circuit district attorney charged Gatny with involuntary manslaughter and reckless conduct, but that grand jury declined to indict.
2014-02-14	D'Andre Berghardt Jr. (20)	Black	Las Vegas, Nevada	Unarmed man killed by police. Berghardt died at the scene. His name was released by the Clark County coroner’s office on Sunday, but little has been forthcoming from the police agencies involved. The Highway Patrol has said nothing since the day of the shooting.
2014-02-13	Javier Mendez (35)	Hispanic	West Covina, California	
2014-02-13	Jose Manuel Meza Avendano (21)	Hispanic	Phoenix, Arizona	
2014-02-12	Dennis Grohn (32)	White	Menomonie, Wisconsin	
2014-02-13	Joseph R. Wharton (48)	White	Centralia, Washington	Man was fatally shot by police after he allegedly confronted an officer with a knife and was also armed with a gun
2014-02-12	Stephon Averyhart (27)	Black	St. Louis, Missouri	
2014-02-11	Pamela Hutcherson (52)	White	Nashville, Tennessee	
2014-02-11	Jedadiah Zillmer (23)	White	Spokane Valley, Washington	
2014-02-10	Anthony Jamal Bartley (21)	Black	Fernandina Beach, Florida	
2014-02-10	Robert Miguel Gutierrez Villa (23)	Hispanic	Tustin, California	He was taken to Western Medical Center Santa Ana in critical condition, but he later died.
2014-02-10	Deonta Dewight Mackey (16)	Black	Chicago, Illinois	
2014-02-10	Anthony Bartley (21)	Black	Yulee, Florida	
2014-02-10	Leroy Turner (20)	Black	Houston, Texas	
2014-02-09	Donald Haynes (45)	Black	Stockton, California	
2014-02-09	Ernest Satterwhite (68)	Black	North Augusta, South Carolina	Satterwhite was involved in a 9-mile slow-speed chase with police and then shot and killed in his driveway by officer North Augusta Public Safety officer Justin Craven. Little information has been released on the case. In August 2014, Craven was formally charged with misdemeanor conduct in Satterwhite's death. A charge of felony voluntary manslaughter was considered by prosecutors but was not filed against Craven. In April 2015, Craven was arrested and charged with the felony of discharging a firearm into an occupied vehicle.
2014-02-07	Johnny Rico Richardson (27)	Black	Ruston, Louisiana	
2014-02-07	Keith Walker (49)	White	Brookshire, Texas	
2014-02-07	Brad Allen Mason (42)	White	Kalamazoo, Michigan	
2014-02-07	Mathew Vincent Serbus (36)	White	Eden Prairie, Minnesota	Matthew V. Serbus, 36, and Dawn M. Pfister, 34, were shot several times by four officers after the car they fled police and crashed in Eden Prairie and they emerged with a knife.
2014-02-07	Dawn Marie Pfister (36)	White	Eden Prairie, Minnesota	Matthew V. Serbus, 36, and Dawn M. Pfister, 34, were shot several times by four officers after the car they fled police and crashed in Eden Prairie and they emerged with a knife.
2014-02-06	Stephen Wayne Ross (43)	White	Glendale, Arizona	The suspect in an officer-involved shooting in Glendale Thursday morning has died, according to police.
2014-02-05	James L. Norris (25)	Black	Salisbury, Maryland	
2014-02-05	Willie James Sams (21)	Black	Liberty City, Florida	
2014-02-05	Earl Edward Clague Jr. (51)	White	Perry, Florida	
2014-02-04	Walls, William Roy Sr. (78)		Centerville, Maryland	Deputies were responding to a report of an armed suicidal man. Walls came outside with a shotgun when they arrived at the residence. After police say Walls fired at the deputies, three deputies returned fire, striking Walls. An autopsy found that Walls died of multiple gunshot wounds, including two gunshot wounds from the deputies and one self-inflicted wound.
2014-02-04	Anesson Joseph (28)	Black	Delray Beach, Florida	
2014-02-04	Ariel Levy (62)	Black	Hayward, California	
2014-02-04	Name Withheld (45)	Unknown race	Philadelphia, Pennsylvania	
2014-02-04	Randall Hatori (39)	Native Hawaiian and Pacific Islander	Kailua-Kona, Hawaii	
2014-02-04	Don Pooley (34)	Black	Arvada, Colorado	
2014-02-03	Mark Garcia (56)	Hispanic	Chicago, Illinois	
2014-02-01	Michael Bourquin-Burch (21)	White	Spanaway, Washington	
2014-02-01	Kevin Dejon Grissett (25)	Black	Hope Mills, North Carolina	

== See also ==
- Death in custody § United States
- Henry A. Wallace Police Crime Public Database
- List of cases of police brutality
- List of countries with annual rates and counts for killings by law enforcement officers
- List of law enforcement officers killed in the line of duty in the United States
- List of law enforcement officers convicted for an on-duty killing in the United States
- List of shootings by US immigration agents
- List of police reforms related to the George Floyd protests
- List of unarmed African Americans killed by law enforcement officers in the United States
- Lists of killings by law enforcement officers
- Police brutality in the United States
- Police misconduct § United States
- Police riot § United States
- Police use of deadly force in the United States
