= Plant Bowen =

Coal-fired power station in Georgia, United States

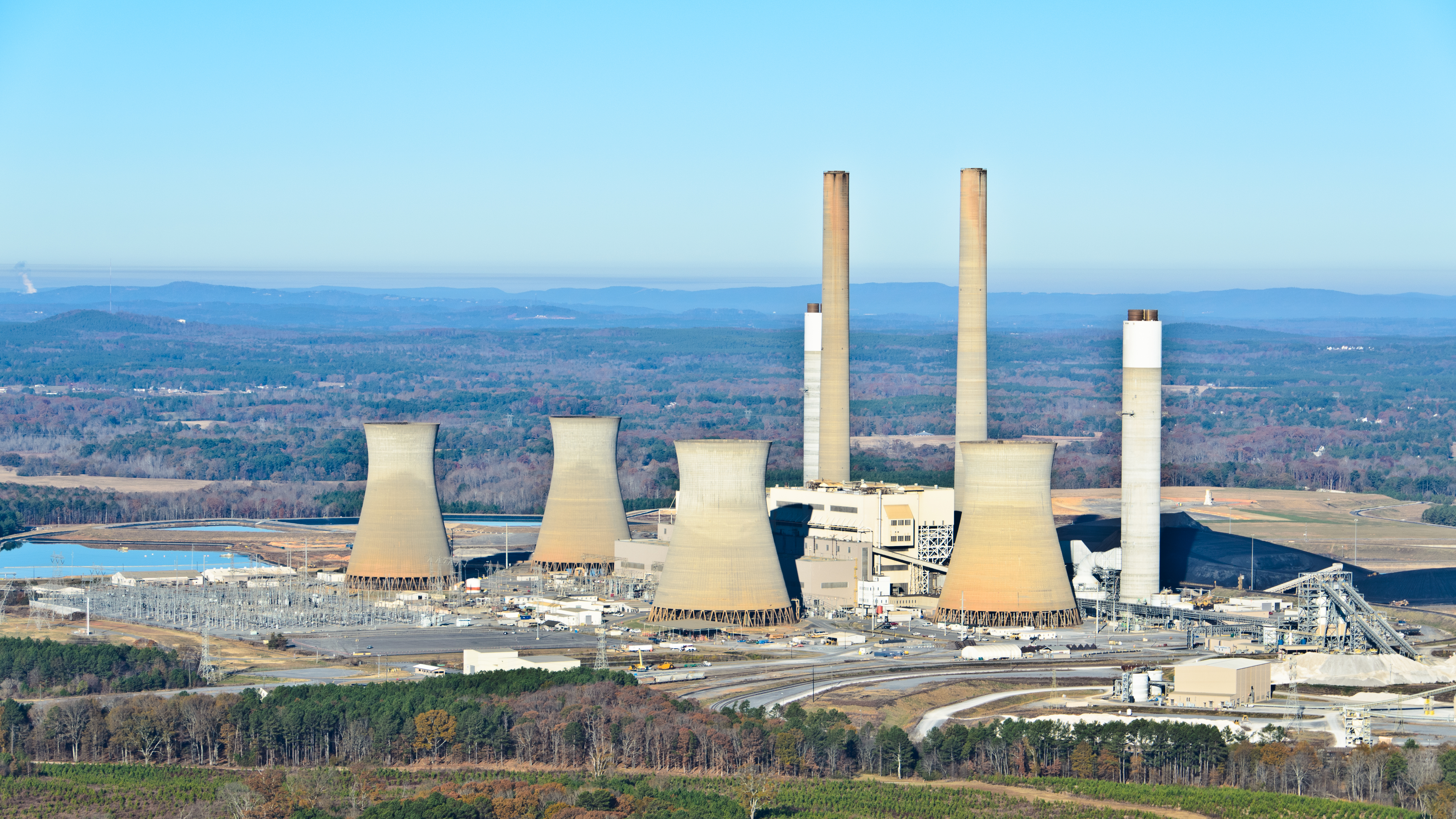
- Plant Bowen, 2012
- Country: United States
- Location: 317 Covered Bridge Road SW, Euharlee 30120 Bartow County, near Euharlee, Georgia
- Coordinates: 34°07′23″N 84°55′13″W
- Status: Operational
- Commission date: Unit 1 - 1971; Unit 2 - 1972; Unit 3 - 1974; Unit 4 - 1975
- Owner: Georgia Power

Thermal power station
- Primary fuel: Coal (Bituminous Coal)
- Turbine technology: Steam turbine

Power generation
- Nameplate capacity: 3,499 MW
- Annual net output: 22,600 GWh (2006)

External links
- Commons: Related media on Commons

Plant Bowen, commonly known as Bowen Steam Plant, is a coal-fired power station located just outside Euharlee, Georgia, United States, approximately 8.7 mi (14 km) west-south-west from Cartersville. At over 3,450 megawatts, Plant Bowen is the largest coal-fired power plant in North America. The station is connected to the southeastern power grid by numerous 500 kV transmission lines, and is owned and operated by Georgia Power, a subsidiary of Southern Company.

== Description ==
Plant Bowen consists of four units, with capacities of 806, 789, 952, and 952 megawatts, respectively. The first unit began operation in 1971, and additional units were brought online in 1972, 1974, and 1975, respectively.

Bowen's four cooling towers are 381 ft (116 m) tall and 318 ft (97 m) in diameter and can cool 1,100,000 U.S. gallons (4,200 cubic meters) per minute. Another 26,000 US gallons (98 m^{3}) per minute or 37 million US gallons (140,000 m^{3}) per day of water is lost to evaporation which creates the distinctive white clouds rising from each tower.

Bowen's two smokestacks are 1,001 ft (305 m) tall. Particulates are removed from the exhaust gases through the use of electrostatic precipitators. The exhaust gases are then closely monitored to comply with air quality regulations. In addition, Jet Bubble Reactor (JBR) units have recently been constructed on all four units to meet federal clean air and ozone standards. Coal for this plant comes from Eastern Kentucky and is delivered by CSX Transportation Inc. Atlanta Division crews with unit coal trains that are sometimes 120 cars long.

== Incidents ==
On 4 April 2013, an explosion occurred on unit 2 while it was being removed from service and readied for a planned maintenance outage. This caused significant damage to the plant but there were no serious injuries. The explosion was attributed to a mixture of hydrogen and air in the generator, due to failure to comply with procedures.

On July 13, 2017, a transformer in the plant's switchyard caught fire. A thick, black cloud of smoke was formed, but no one was injured.

== See also ==
- List of coal power stations
- List of largest power stations in the world
- List of power stations in the United States
