= 17th Georgia Infantry Regiment =

Infantry regiment of the Confederate States Army

- Georgia State flag prior to 1879
- Active: August 12, 1861 – April 9, 1865
- Country: Confederate States
- Allegiance: State of Georgia
- Branch: Confederate Army
- Type: Infantry
- Engagements: American Civil War

Commanders
- Notable commanders: Henry Lewis Benning

The 17th Georgia Infantry Regiment was an infantry regiment in the Confederate States Army during the American Civil War.

== Organization ==
The regiment was raised from eight different counties in Georgia (mostly in the western part of the state) and officially organized in Atlanta from August 12 to August 15, 1861, and armed with British Enfield pattern rifles. The regiment's first commander was Col. Henry L. Benning, a prominent lawyer and judge in Muscogee County (Columbus area).

The 17th Georgia was composed of ten companies, each initially with roughly one hundred men.

- Company A: Webster County—"Webster Rifles"
- Company B: Schley County—"Schley Volunteers"
- Company C: Muscogee County—"Columbus Volunteers"
- Company D: Decatur County—"Decatur Guards"
- Company E: Mitchell County—"Stephens Infantry"
- Company F: Muscogee County
- Company G: Dougherty County
- Company H: Harris County—"Harris Bartows"
- Company I: Stewart County
- Company K: Stewart and Webster counties—"Webster Confederate Guards"

== Initial deployment and service ==
The 17th Georgia was sent to northern Virginia via railroad through Tennessee and Lynchburg. It was brigaded with the 1st, 2nd, 15th, and 20th Georgia regiments. The 1st Georgia transferred out in October 1861 when the army was being restructured. The 17th Georgia eventually became part of Toombs' brigade, D.R. Jones' Division, Army of the Potomac. It saw its first combat in May 1862 on the Peninsula, serving in the wing of Maj. Gen. John B. Magruder as he opposed the Federal Army's advance under Maj. Gen. George B. McClellan. After periods of intense rain and small insignificant actions, the 17th Georgia fell back towards Richmond and did not participate in the counterattack led by General Joseph E. Johnston at the Battle of Seven Pines. After this battle, General Robert E. Lee took command of the army and renamed it the Army of Northern Virginia.

However, the regiment did not rest for long. On June 27, 1862, the 17th Georgia, along with the rest of Toombs' Brigade, engaged Federal forces at the Battle of Garnett's Farm. The 17th secured the left flank of the brigade, while the 2nd and 15th Georgia heavily engaged the enemy and lost many killed and wounded. The following day, after a grueling twenty-mile (32 km) march in the hot sun, the regiment finally stopped to rest. On July 1, the 17th Georgia participated in the final day of the Seven Days Campaign fighting at the Battle of Malvern Hill. The brigade lost almost 300 men killed and wounded during the Seven Days, including two regimental commanders and two adjutants.

The 17th Georgia moved south out of Maryland with the army and took up positions on the south side of the Rappahannock River in Virginia. It was at this point that Colonel Benning was given command of the brigade, and Col. Wesley Hodges assumed command of the regiment. During the Battle of Fredericksburg, the brigade was not heavily engaged and suffered only two wounded and two killed.

== Later service ==
It was shortly after Fredericksburg that the division, along with General George Pickett's division, was sent down to southern Virginia to forage for the rest of the army. As the unit marched through Richmond, it received a new divisional commander, the bold and brash John Bell Hood. (The previous commander, Maj. Gen. David R. Jones, had died of sickness on January 15, 1863.) It was at this point the brigade was issued new uniforms from the Richmond Depot, most likely the Type-II pattern shell jackets in Richmond Gray wool. After several months in the Suffolk area with two other Confederate divisions, Hood's Division rejoined Lee's army in late May, but missed out on the stunning Southern victory at Chancellorsville.

With the loss of General Jackson at Chancellorsville, the army was again reorganized; this time into three army corps, each consisting of three divisions. The 17th Georgia remained in Benning's Brigade, which was assigned to Hood's Division within General Longstreet's First Corps. The regiment moved north once more in June and engaged the Federal Army of the Potomac on July 2, 1863, at Gettysburg. The regiment was part of the attack on Federals defending the Devil's Den at the foot of Little Round Top. That day, Benning's Brigade captured 300 prisoners and several 10-pounder Parrott rifles. In addition, the brigade (along with Robertson and Law's brigades), secured Houck's Ridge and Devil's Den, driving off Ward's brigade of the 1st Division, III Corps, Army of the Potomac (124th New York, 86th New York, 99th Pennsylvania, 20th Indiana, and 4th Maine). The brigade did not participate in the fight of the third day, but it had lost over 300 men killed and wounded and two more regimental commanders.

The 17th Georgia was then shipped to the Western Theater, along with most of Longstreet's Corps, and participated in the Battle of Chickamauga in September 1863. The 17th also participated in the East Tennessee Campaign, the Wilderness campaign, the Cold Harbor/Mechanicsville campaign, and the Siege of Petersburg.

The 17th Georgia surrendered at Appomattox Court House, along with much of the remainder of the Army of Northern Virginia, on April 9, 1865.

== Reenactors ==
There is currently a living history organization in Columbus, Georgia, that portrays Co. K of the 17th Georgia.

== See also ==
- List of Civil War regiments from Georgia
