= SS Henry L. Benning =

Liberty ship of WWII

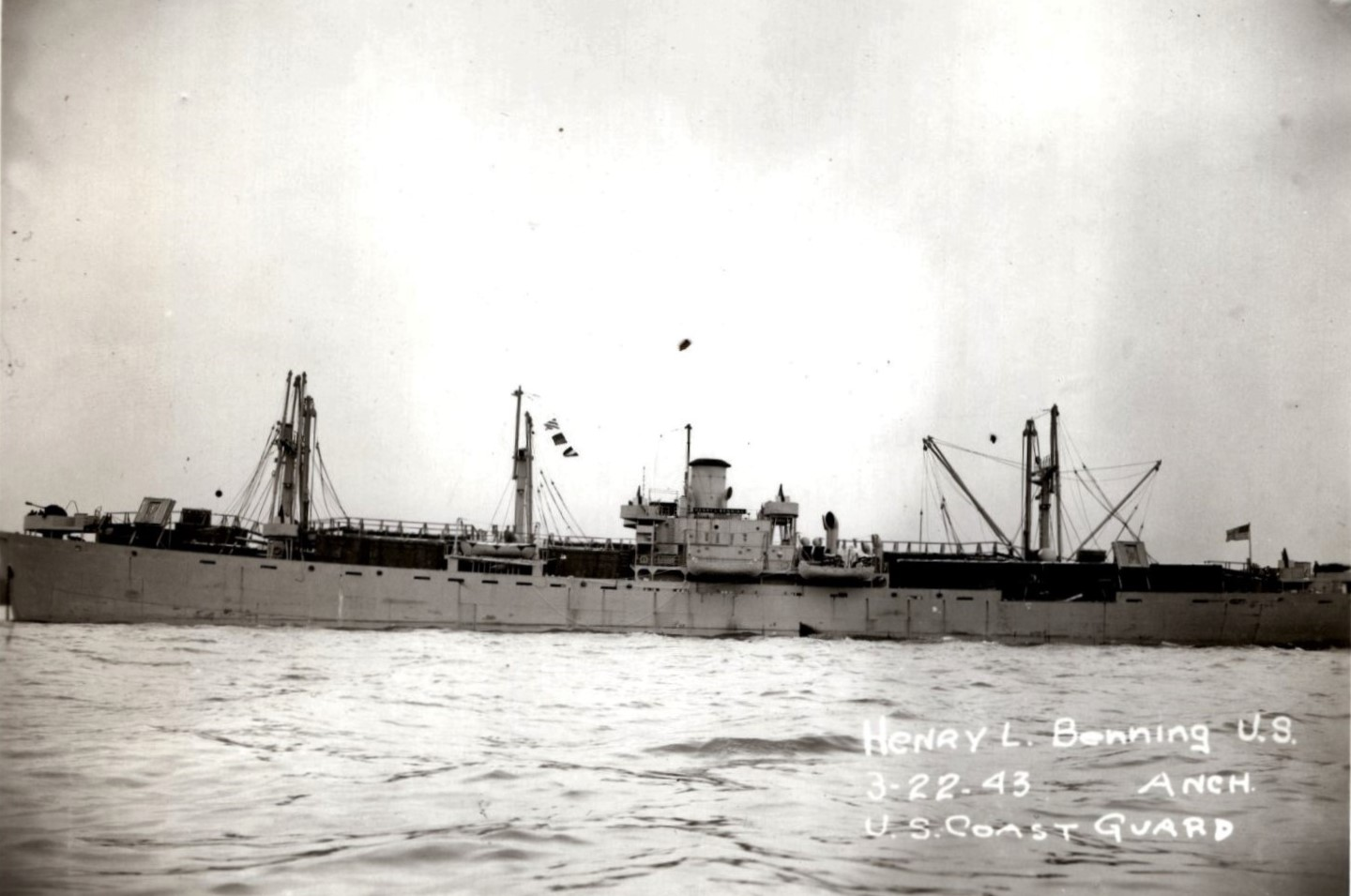
- Liberty ship SS Henry L. Benning 22 March 1943

History

United States
- Name: Henry L. Benning
- Namesake: Henry L. Benning
- Owner: War Shipping Administration (WSA)
- Operator: Cosmopolitan Shipping Co., Inc.
- Ordered: as type (EC2-S-C1) hull, MCE hull 946
- Awarded: 30 January 1942
- Builder: Bethlehem-Fairfield Shipyard, Baltimore, Maryland
- Cost: $1,071,165
- Yard number: 2096
- Way number: 0
- Laid down: 12 January 1943
- Launched: 22 February 1943
- Sponsored by: Miss Ann A. Thoron
- Completed: 9 March 1943
- Identification: Call sign: KKMX
- Fate: Laid up in reserve fleet, 5 February 1946, sold, 30 January 1951

United States
- Owner: A. H. Bull Steamship Co.
- Renamed: Dorothy; Emma, 27 October 1961
- Fate: Sold, 11 October 1962

India
- Name: Nanak Jayanti
- Owner: Jayanti Shipping Co.
- Fate: Scrapped, December 1967

General characteristics
- Class & type: Liberty ship; type EC2-S-C1, standard
- Tonnage: 10,865 LT DWT; 7,176 GRT
- Displacement: 3,380 long tons (3,434 t) (light); 14,245 long tons (14,474 t) (max)
- Length: 441 feet 6 inches (135 m) oa; 416 feet (127 m) pp; 427 feet (130 m) lwl
- Beam: 57 feet (17 m)
- Draft: 27 ft 9.25 in (8.4646 m)
- Installed power: 2 × Oil fired 450 °F (232 °C) boilers, operating at 220 psi (1,500 kPa); 2,500 hp (1,900 kW)
- Propulsion: 1 × triple-expansion steam engine, (manufactured by General Machinery Corp., Hamilton, Ohio); 1 × screw propeller
- Speed: 11.5 knots (21.3 km/h; 13.2 mph)
- Capacity: 562,608 cubic feet (15,931 m^{3}) (grain); 499,573 cubic feet (14,146 m^{3}) (bale)
- Complement: 38–62 USMM; 21–40 USNAG
- Armament: Varied by ship; Bow-mounted 3-inch (76 mm)/50-caliber gun; Stern-mounted 4-inch (102 mm)/50-caliber gun; 2–8 × single 20-millimeter (0.79 in) Oerlikon anti-aircraft (AA) cannons and/or, 2–8 × 37-millimeter (1.46 in) M1 AA guns

SS Henry L. Benning was a Liberty ship built in the United States during World War II. She was named after Henry L. Benning, a senior officer of the Confederate States Army in the American Civil War. Benning also was a lawyer, legislator, and associate judge on the Georgia Supreme Court.

== Construction ==
Henry L. Benning was laid down on 12 January 1943, under a Maritime Commission (MARCOM) contract, MCE hull 946, by the Bethlehem-Fairfield Shipyard, Baltimore, Maryland; she was sponsored by Miss Ann A. Thoron, granddaughter of Henry Benning, and launched on 22 February 1943.

== History ==
She was allocated to the Cosmopolitan Shipping Co., Inc., on 9 March 1943.

On 5 February 1946, she was laid up in the James River Reserve Fleet, in Lee Hall, Virginia, with $29,854, worth of damages. She was delivered to the Operations Department, on 12 February 1947. On 23 February 1948, she was laid up in the Wilmington Reserve Fleet, in Wilmington, North Carolina. On 30 January 1951, she was sold to A. H. Bull Steamship Co.. She was renamed Dorothy, and later renamed Emma, 27 October 1961. On 11 October 1962, she was sold and reflagged in India, and renamed Nanak Jayanti, she was scrapped in December 1967.

== Bibliography ==
- "Bethlehem-Fairfield, Baltimore MD". www.ShipbuildingHistory.com. 7 August 2021.
- Maritime Administration. "Henry L. Benning". Ship History Database Vessel Status Card. U.S. Department of Transportation, Maritime Administration.
- Davies, James (May 2004). "Specifications (As-Built)" (PDF). p. 23.
- "SS Henry L. Benning".
