= Seaborn Jones =

American politician (1788–1864)

Member of the U.S. House of Representatives from Georgia
- In office March 4, 1845 – March 3, 1847
- Preceded by: District established
- Succeeded by: Alfred Iverson Sr.
- Constituency: 2nd district
- In office March 4, 1833 – March 3, 1835
- Preceded by: District established
- Succeeded by: Charles E. Haynes
- Constituency: at-large district

Personal details
- Born: February 1, 1788 Augusta, Province of Georgia, British America
- Died: March 18, 1864 (aged 76) Columbus, Georgia, U.S.
- Resting place: Linwood Cemetery
- Party: Democratic
- Other political affiliations: Jacksonian
- Children: 1
- Education: Princeton College
- Profession: Politician, lawyer

Seaborn Jones (February 1, 1788 – March 18, 1864) was a United States representative from Georgia. Born in Augusta, Georgia, he attended Princeton College and studied law. By a special act of the legislature, he was admitted to the bar in 1808. He commenced a legal practice in Milledgeville.

Jones was appointed Solicitor General of the Ocmulgee circuit in September 1817 and was Solicitor General of Georgia in 1823. He was one of the commissioners appointed to investigate the disturbances in the Creek Nation; in 1827, he moved to Columbus, Georgia, where he built his home El Dorado, later renamed St. Elmo. Jones was elected as a Jacksonian to the Twenty-third Congress, serving from March 4, 1833, to March 3, 1835. He later was elected as a Democrat to the Twenty-ninth Congress, serving from March 4, 1845, to March 3, 1847. He died in Columbus, and was buried at Linwood Cemetery.

Jones's daughter, Mary Howard Jones, married Henry L. Benning, for whom Fort Benning was named. In 2002, the Seaborn Jones Memorial Park in Rockmart, Georgia, was named after Jones.

U.S. House of Representatives
Preceded by New seat	Member of the U.S. House of Representatives from Georgia's at-large congressional district March 4, 1833 – March 3, 1835	Succeeded by Charles Eaton Haynes
Preceded by At Large Districts	Member of the U.S. House of Representatives from Georgia's 2nd congressional district March 4, 1845 – March 3, 1847	Succeeded by Alfred Iverson Sr.
