= Black Pioneers Cemetery, Euharlee =

Cemetery in Bartow County, Georgia, US

Coordinates: 34°08′50″N 84°56′00″W

Black Pioneers Cemetery
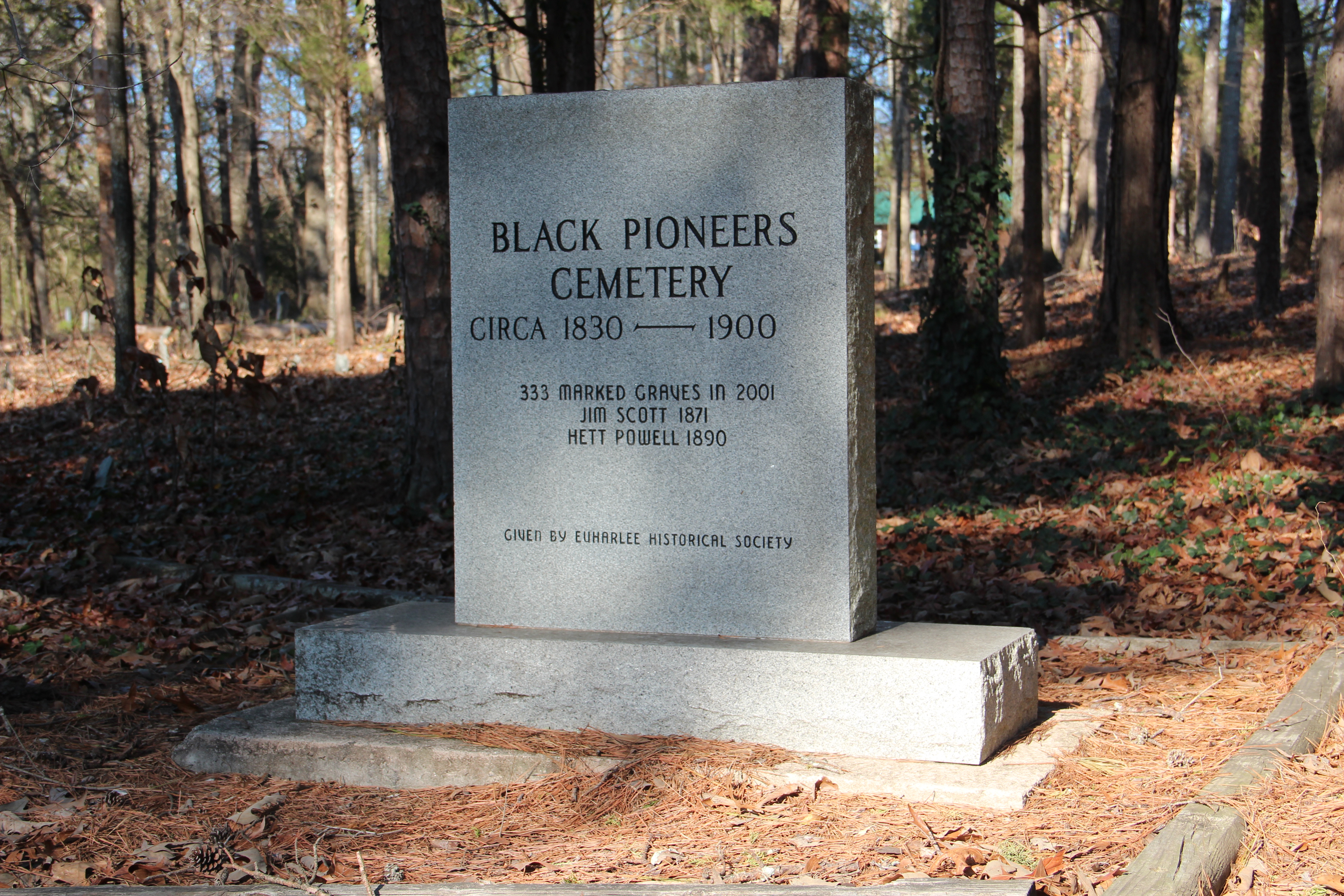
- Black Pioneers Cemetery marker
- Interactive map of Black Pioneers Cemetery

Details
- Established: 1830
- Abandoned: 1900
- Location: Euharlee, Georgia
- No. of graves: Over 300

Black Pioneers Cemetery in Euharlee, Georgia was in use from approximately 1830–1900, and had over 300 graves. It was largely forgotten until 2002 when Euharlee Historical Society saved the site from development.

== Geography ==
This cemetery is located in Euharlee, Georgia on Covered Bridge Road between Euharlee Baptist Church and Euharlee Presbyterian Church. Until 2002 this area was a patch of pine trees and underbrush that had no apparent significance. That began to change when plans arose to put a building in this site.

== Discovery ==
Mary Ellen Taff of the Euharlee Historical Society informed the city officials of the cemetery's existence. Mrs. Taff believed that the last burial was in 1900 and that was the reason this cemetery had been forgotten. Many community volunteers donated time and effort in clearing the underbrush and vines that had grown up in this area of approximately one acre in size. Carlton Ethridge, Etowah Valley Historical Society's Cemetery Preservation Chairperson, then identified and marked the graves." Descendants of the Goodes and Godhighs, two of the pioneer black families, have made affidavits certifying that the area was a final resting place for some of their family members." On August 17, 2002 a marker for this cemetery was dedicated by the Euharlee Historical Society. At that time the marker, purchased by the Euharlee Historical Society simply read "Black Pioneers Cemetery Circa 1830–1900." All this was done in an effort to make sure that these black pioneers and their cemetery would not be forgotten again.

== Background ==
Historically black families and white families attended church together. This was before the black families established their own churches and cemeteries. In the histories of the two neighboring churches, black or "colored" members are listed on the church rolls.

== Present ==
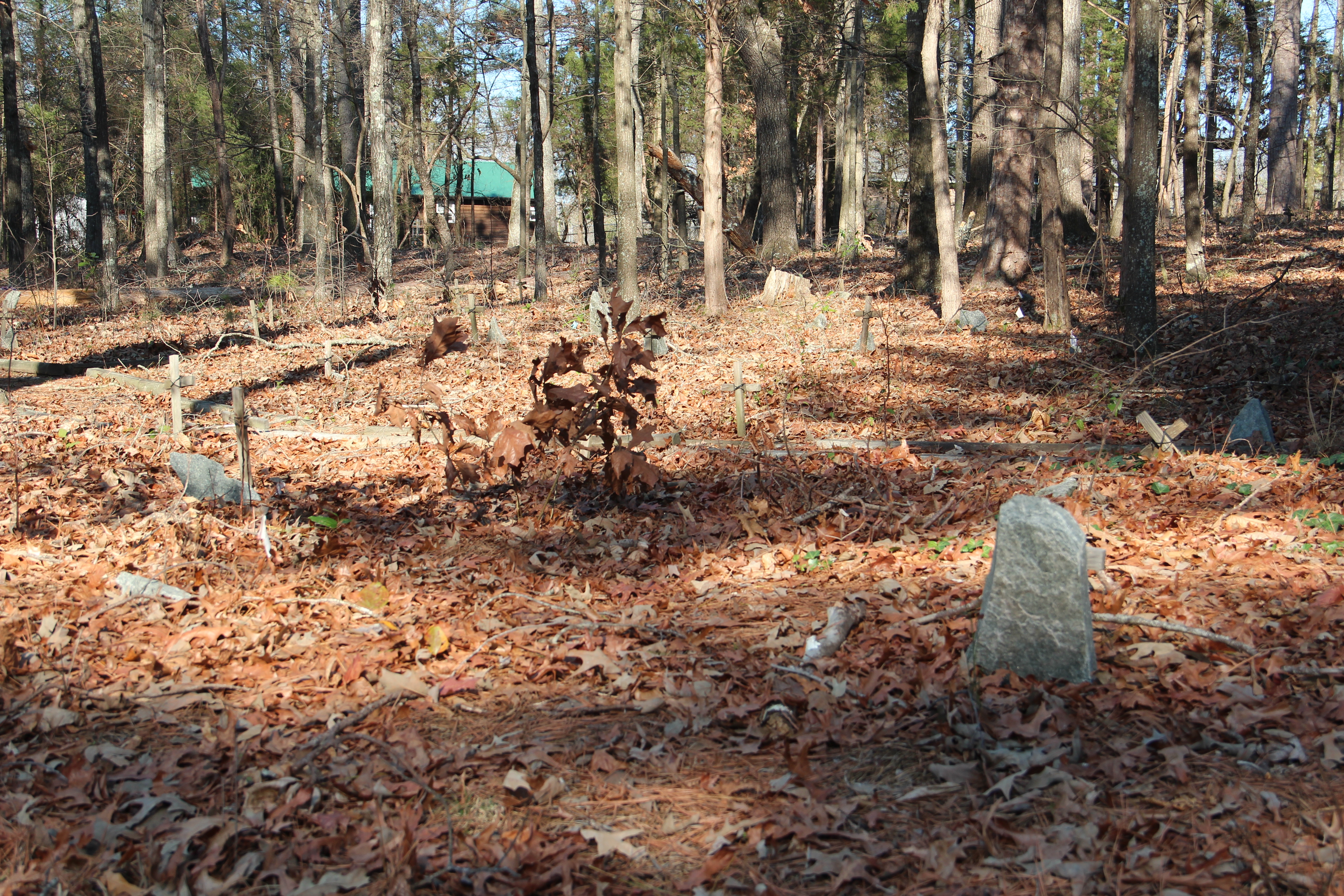
Wooden crosses at the cemetery

Today the marker reads "Black Pioneers Cemetery, Circa 1830–1900, 333 marked graves were present in 2001," and now has the names of two people who were remembered to have been buried there. In 2007 Eagle Scouts made wooden crosses and placed them throughout the cemetery.
