= Marshall Johnson Wellborn =

American politician (1808–1874)

Marshall J. Wellborn

Member of the U.S. House of Representatives from Georgia's 2nd district
- In office March 4, 1849 – March 3, 1851
- Preceded by: Alfred Iverson Sr.
- Succeeded by: James Johnson

Personal details
- Born: Marshall Johnson Wellborn; May 29, 1808 near Eatonton, Georgia, U.S.
- Died: October 16, 1874 (aged 66) Columbus, Georgia, U.S.
- Resting place: Oakland Cemetery, Atlanta, Georgia, U.S.
- Party: Democratic
- Education: University of Georgia
- Profession: Politician, lawyer, jurist

Marshall Johnson Wellborn (May 29, 1808 – October 16, 1874) was an American politician, lawyer and jurist. From 1849 to 1851, he served one term as a Democratic member of the U.S. House of Representatives from Georgia.

== Biography ==
Born near Eatonton, Georgia in 1808 and attended the University of Georgia (UGA) in Athens. He studied law and was admitted to the state bar in 1826. He began practicing law in Columbus, Georgia, and was elected to the Georgia House of Representatives in 1833 and 1834. From 1838 through 1842, he was a Georgia superior court judge.

=== Congress ===
Wellborn was elected in 1848 as a Democrat to represent Georgia's 2nd congressional district in the United States House of Representatives during the 31st Congress.

After his congressional service, Wellborn became an ordained Baptist minister in 1864.

=== Death and burial ===
He died in Columbus on October 16, 1874, and was buried in historic Oakland Cemetery in Atlanta, Georgia.

U.S. House of Representatives
Preceded by Alfred Iverson Sr.	Member of the U.S. House of Representatives from Georgia's 2nd congressional district 1849–1851	Succeeded by James Johnson
