= Alfred Iverson Sr. =

American politician

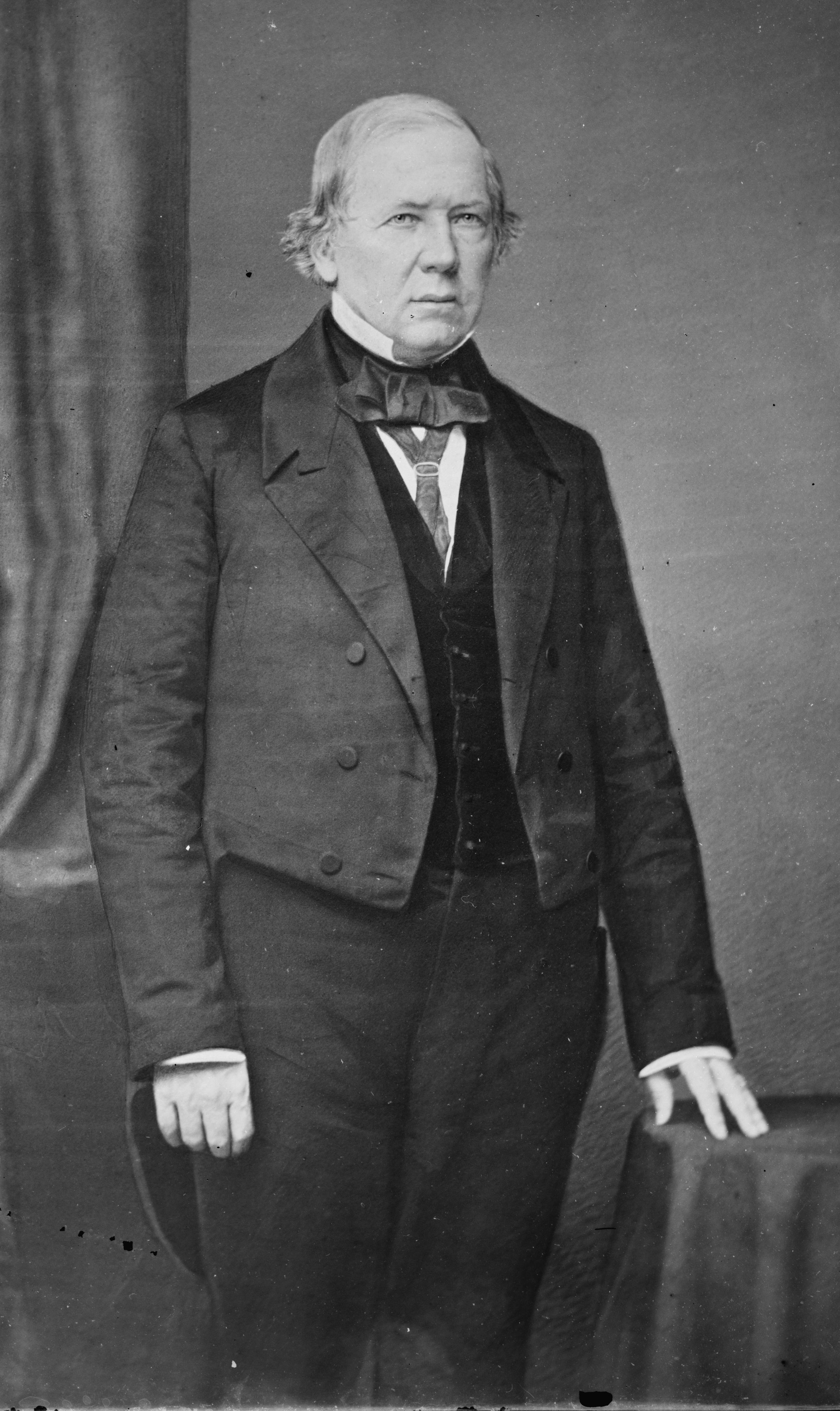

United States Senator from Georgia
- In office March 4, 1855 – January 28, 1861
- Preceded by: William C. Dawson
- Succeeded by: Joshua Hill

Member of the U.S. House of Representatives from Georgia's 2nd district
- In office March 4, 1847 – March 3, 1849
- Preceded by: Seaborn Jones
- Succeeded by: Marshall J. Wellborn

Member of the Georgia Senate
- In office 1843-1844

Member of the Georgia House of Representatives
- In office 1827-1830

Personal details
- Born: December 3, 1798 Liberty County, Georgia
- Died: March 4, 1873 (aged 74) Macon, Georgia
- Party: Democratic
- Spouse(s): Caroline Holt; Julia Frances Forsyth

Alfred Iverson Sr. (December 3, 1798 – March 4, 1873) was a United States representative and Senator from Georgia.

== Early life ==
Born in Liberty County, he attended private schools and graduated from the College of New Jersey (now Princeton University) in 1820. He studied law, was admitted to the bar in 1822 and commenced practice in Clinton, a community in Jones County, Georgia.

== Political life ==
He was a member of the Georgia House of Representatives from 1827 to 1830, and moved to Columbus in 1830 and continued the practice of law. He was judge of the State superior court from 1835 to 1837, a member of the Georgia Senate in 1843–1844, and a presidential elector on the Democratic ticket in 1844.

Iverson was elected as a Democrat to the Thirtieth Congress (March 4, 1847 – March 3, 1849). From 1850 to 1854 he again served as judge of the State superior court, and was elected to the United States Senate and served from March 4, 1855, to January 28, 1861, when he withdrew. While in the Senate he was chairman of the Committee on Claims (Thirty-fifth and Thirty-sixth Congresses). While a senator, he repudiated popular sovereignty. Iverson left the Senate shortly after Georgia passed an ordinance of secession from the United States and after making a defiant farewell speech, stating that Southerners would never return to the Union "short of a full and explicit recognition of the guarantee of the safety of their institution of domestic slavery."

== Death and legacy ==
After leaving the Senate, he resumed the practice of law in Columbus until 1868, when he purchased a plantation in East Macon and engaged in agricultural pursuits until his death there in 1873; interment was in Linwood Cemetery.

His son Alfred Iverson Jr. was a Confederate general in the American Civil War.

== Other sources ==
- United States Congress. "Alfred Iverson Sr. (id: I000049)". Biographical Directory of the United States Congress.

U.S. House of Representatives
Preceded by Seaborn Jones	Member of the U.S. House of Representatives from Georgia's 2nd congressional district March 4, 1847 – March 3, 1849	Succeeded by Marshall J. Wellborn
U.S. Senate
Preceded by William C. Dawson	U.S. senator (Class 3) from Georgia; 1855–1861; Served alongside: Robert A. Toombs	Succeeded by vacant^{a}
Notes and references
1. Georgia seceded from the Union in 1861. Seat declared vacant until Joshua Hill elected after Georgia's readmission into the Union in 1870.
