= Euharlee Covered Bridge =

Covered bridge in Georgia, United States

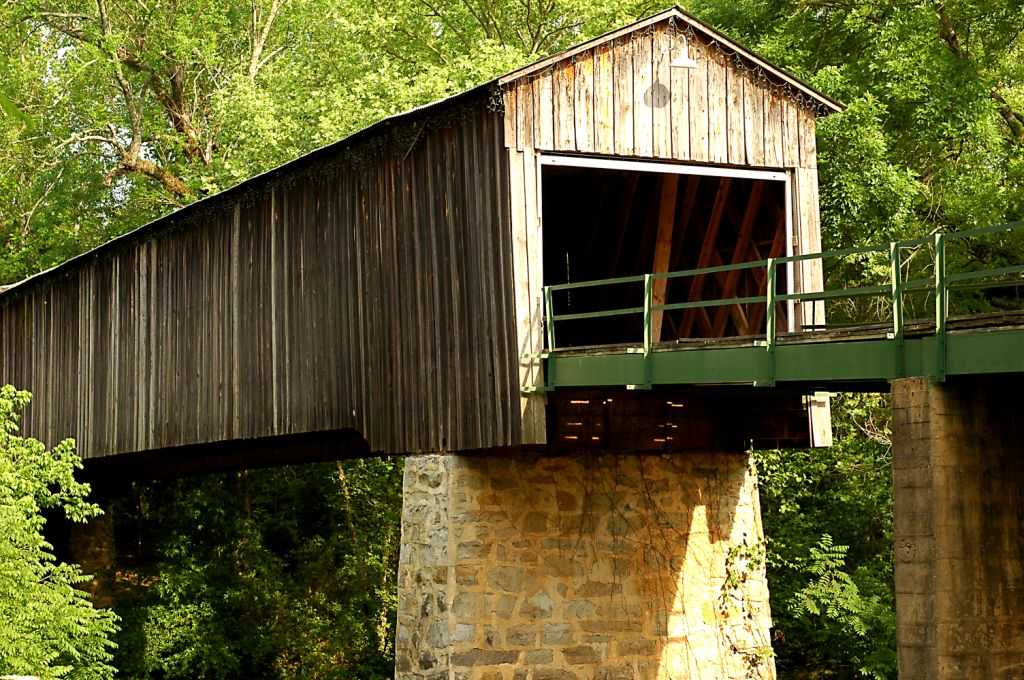
- Coordinates: 34°8′33.7″N 84°55′51.8″W
- Crosses: Euharlee Creek
- Locale: Euharlee, Georgia, United States

Characteristics
- Design: Covered bridge

Location
- Interactive map of Euharlee Covered Bridge

The Euharlee Covered Bridge, also known as the Euharlee Creek Covered Bridge or rarely the Lowry Bridge, is a wooden Town lattice covered bridge crossing Euharlee Creek in Euharlee, Georgia, United States, a small town west of Cartersville. The bridge was built after the raging creek swept away an old bridge on the property of Daniel Lowry. The collapse of the bridge killed one man. A new bridge was built using some materials provided by Lowry next to the mill located adjacent to the bridge site.

The bridge was built in 1886 by Horace King's son Washington King and Johnathan H. Burke. The bridge spans 138 feet. The lattice trusses consist of planks crisscrossing at 45- to 60-degree angles and are fastened with wooden pegs, or trunnels, at each intersection. Traffic stopped across the bridge in 1980 when a new two-lane bridge was built.

== See also ==
- List of covered bridges in Georgia
