= Euharlee, Georgia =

- City
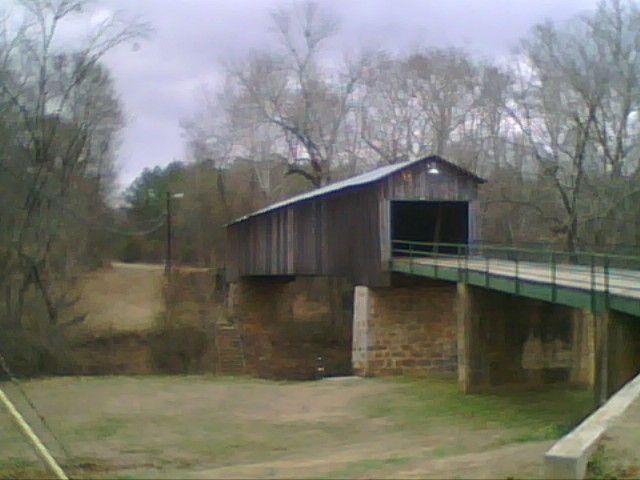
- Euharlee Creek Covered Bridge

- Flag Logo

- Location in Bartow County and the state of Georgia
- Coordinates: 34°8′50″N 84°56′11″W
- Country: United States
- State: Georgia
- County: Bartow
- Incorporated: January 1, 1976
- Named for: "she laughs as she runs" in Cherokee language.

Government
  - Mayor: Craig B. Guyton
  - City Manager: James Stephens

Area
  - Total: 5.56 sq mi (14.40 km^{2})
  - Land: 5.41 sq mi (14.00 km^{2})
  - Water: 0.15 sq mi (0.40 km^{2})
- Elevation: 682 ft (208 m)

Population (2020)
  - Total: 4,268
  - Density: 789.8/sq mi (304.94/km^{2})
- Time zone: UTC-5 (Eastern (EST))
  - Summer (DST): UTC-4 (EDT)
- ZIP codes: 30120, 30145
- Area codes: 770/678/470/943
- FIPS code: 13-27988
- GNIS feature ID: 0313985
- Website: www.euharlee.com

Euharlee is a city in Bartow County, Georgia, United States. As of the 2020 census, Euharlee had a population of 4,268.

Euharlee is a bedroom community of Cartersville, the Bartow County seat which is located 9 miles (14 km) to the east. They are connected through Euharlee Road, and by a chain of subdivisions and homes. Euharlee is located next to Plant Bowen, which has the second-largest generating capacity of any coal-fired power plant in the United States.

== History ==
Euharlee was originally called Burge's Mill by settlers as early as the 1840s. The town was incorporated as Euharlee by the General Assembly of Georgia on September 16, 1870. "Euharlee" is a name derived from the Cherokee language, meaning "she laughs as she runs", referring to the sound of the Euharlee Creek.

== Geography ==
Euharlee is located in southwestern Bartow County at 34°8′50″N 84°56′11″W (34.147174, -84.936445). The Etowah River, part of the Alabama River watershed, flows through the eastern part of the city. Euharlee Creek joins the river just south of the center of town and is crossed by the Euharlee Covered Bridge, one of the oldest covered bridges in Georgia.

According to the United States Census Bureau, the city has a total area of 5.4 square miles (14.1 km^{2}), of which 5.3 square miles (13.7 km^{2}) is land and 0.15 square miles (0.4 km^{2}), or 2.83%, is water.

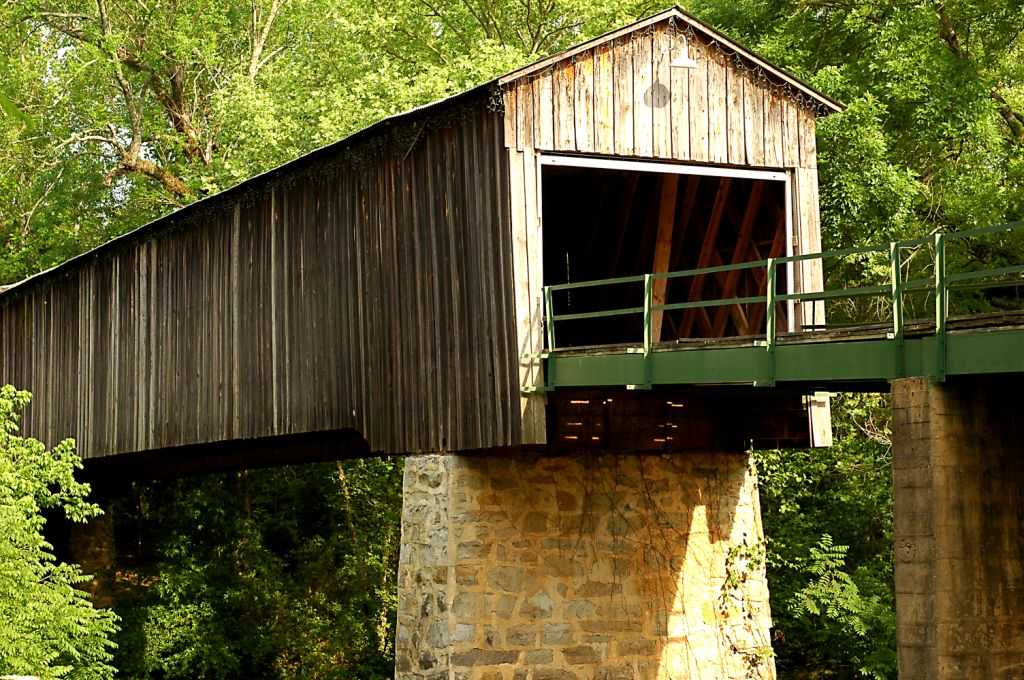
The Euharlee Covered Bridge

== Demographics ==
Historical population
Census	Pop.	Note	%±
1880	24		—
1890	144		500.0%
1980	477		—
1990	850		78.2%
2000	3,208		277.4%
2010	4,136		28.9%
2020	4,268		3.2%
U.S. Decennial Census

=== 2020 census ===
As of the 2020 census, Euharlee had a population of 4,268. The median age was 35.2 years. 26.1% of residents were under the age of 18 and 9.9% of residents were 65 years of age or older. For every 100 females there were 97.2 males, and for every 100 females age 18 and over there were 96.9 males age 18 and over.

There were 1,394 households in Euharlee, of which 44.7% had children under the age of 18 living in them. Of all households, 61.0% were married-couple households, 14.6% were households with a male householder and no spouse or partner present, and 17.1% were households with a female householder and no spouse or partner present. About 12.2% of all households were made up of individuals and 4.5% had someone living alone who was 65 years of age or older. There were 1,100 families residing in the city.

There were 1,441 housing units, of which 3.3% were vacant. The homeowner vacancy rate was 1.0% and the rental vacancy rate was 4.2%. 0.0% of residents lived in urban areas, while 100.0% lived in rural areas.

Euharlee racial composition
Race	Num.	Perc.
White (non-Hispanic)	3,370	78.96%
Black or African American (non-Hispanic)	348	8.15%
Native American	8	0.19%
Asian	13	0.3%
Other/Mixed	283	6.63%
Hispanic or Latino	246	5.76%

=== 2000 census ===
As of the census of 2000, there were 3,208 people, 1,004 households, and 863 families residing in the city. The population density was 694.6 inhabitants per square mile (268.2/km^{2}). There were 1,057 housing units at an average density of 228.8 units per square mile (88.3 units/km^{2}). The racial makeup of the city was 89.31% White, 7.64% African American, 0.50% Native American, 0.62% Asian, 1.12% from other races, and 0.81% from two or more races. Hispanic or Latino of any race were 2.71% of the population.

There were 1,003 households, out of which 55.9% had children under the age of 18 living with them, 71.8% were married couples living together, 8.6% had a female householder with no husband present, and 14.0% were non-families. 10.7% of all households were made up of individuals, and 1.4% had someone living alone who was 65 years of age or older. The average household size was 3.20 and the average family size was 3.43.

In the city, the population was spread out, with 36.4% under the age of 18, 7.9% from 18 to 24, 38.3% from 25 to 44, 14.1% from 45 to 64, and 3.2% who were 65 years of age or older. The median age was 28 years. For every 100 females, there were 95.3 males. For every 100 females age 18 and over, there were 94.2 males.

The median income for a household in the city was $53,714, and the median income for a family was $55,912. Males had a median income of $38,382 versus $24,631 for females. The per capita income for the city was $17,483. About 1.7% of families and 3.0% of the population were below the poverty line, including 3.3% of those under age 18 and none of those age 65 or over.

== Places of interest ==
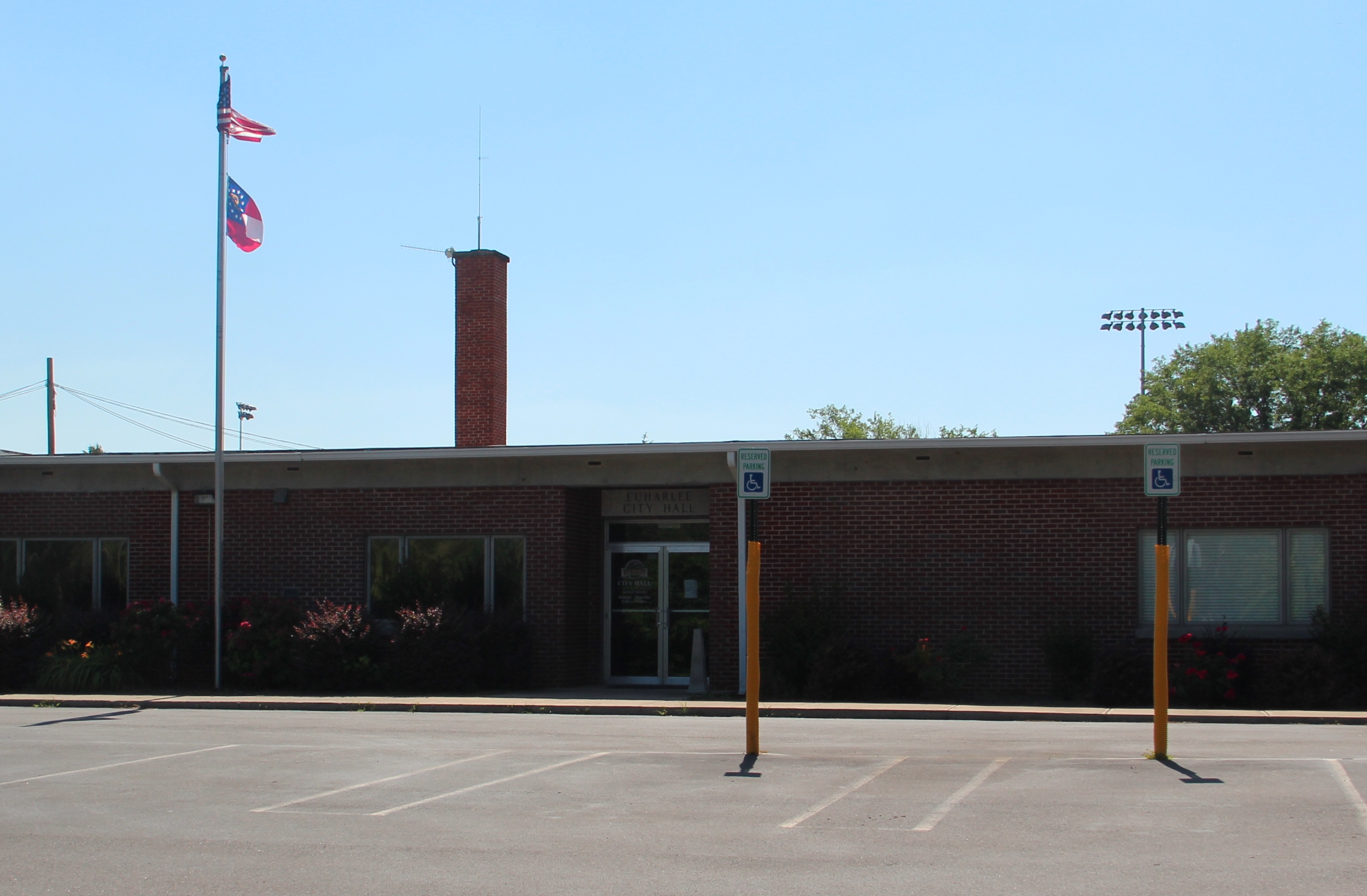
City hall

- Black Pioneer's Cemetery is an area of downtown Euharlee dedicated to preserving the gravesites of several early African-American settlers of the region.
- The Euharlee Covered Bridge goes over Euharlee Creek. It is one of the oldest covered bridges remaining in the state of Georgia. It was built in 1889 by Washington W. King, son of Horace King, and was formerly known as Lowry Bridge.
- The Euharlee Welcome Center and History Museum is local history museum located in historic downtown Euharlee. The museum features an assortment of local artifacts from the early American Indian habitation to an exhibit featuring the area's Civil War history and local institutions.
- Kingston Saltpeter Cave (not open to the public), located between Euharlee and Kingston, is the largest cave in Bartow County and was used to help produce gunpowder for the Confederacy during the American Civil War.

== Schools ==
Euharlee is home to two schools within the Bartow County School District. Woodland Middle School and Euharlee Elementary School are located on Euharlee Road and are directly across the street from each other.

== Fall Festival ==
There is an annual Fall Festival held with the Covered Bridge as the focal point. It is held in October. Local schools are invited to showcase choral and band ensembles throughout the weekend. Crafts and foods are sold by local vendors. There are rides for the children as well.

The festival was increased and relocated from Osborne Park with the completion of Frankie Harris Park behind Emmie Nelson Library at Euharlee in 2005.
