= Henry L. Benning =

Confederate States Army general

- Brigadier General Henry L. Benning by Bjorn Egeli
- Born: Henry Lewis Benning; April 2, 1814; Columbia County, Georgia, U.S.
- Died: July 10, 1875 (aged 61); Columbus, Georgia, U.S.
- Burial place: Linwood Cemetery, Columbus, Georgia, U.S.
- Spouse: Mary Howard Jones (m. 1839)
- Children: 10
- Military career
- Allegiance: Confederate States
- Branch: Confederate States Army
- Service years: 1861–1865
- Rank: Brigadier general
- Nickname: "Old Rock"
- Commands: 17th Georgia Infantry; Benning's Brigade
- Battles: American Civil War; Battle of Antietam; Battle of Gettysburg; Overland Campaign (WIA); Battle of Appomattox (POW)
- Other work: Associate Justice of the Georgia Supreme Court (1853-1861)

Henry Lewis Benning (April 2, 1814 – July 10, 1875) was a Confederate general who commanded infantry in the Eastern Theater of the American Civil War. He was also a lawyer, legislator, and associate judge in the Georgia Supreme Court. Following the Confederacy's defeat, he returned to his native Georgia, where he resumed his legal practice.

At the request of the Columbus Rotary Club in 1918, Fort Benning was named in his honor, and remained such until 2023, when it was renamed to Fort Moore in honor of Hal Moore and his wife, Julia. In March 2025, U.S. Secretary of Defense Pete Hegseth ordered that the military base's name be reverted back to "Fort Benning". However, the name is instead in tribute to Fred G. Benning from Neligh, Nebraska, who was awarded the Distinguished Service Cross for his extraordinary heroism in combat during World War I while serving in France. Fred Benning is not related to Henry Benning.

== Early life and education ==
Henry L. Benning was born on a plantation in Columbia County, Georgia, the third of eleven children of Pleasant Moon Benning and Malinda Meriwether White Benning. His grandfather, Richard White of Richmond, Virginia, had served in the Revolutionary War. In 1820, his father operated the plantation with the labor of 24 enslaved people, and later relocated the family to Harris County, Georgia, in 1832.

Benning received a private education typical of his social class and later attended Franklin College (now the University of Georgia), graduating in 1834. While at Franklin College, he was a member of the Phi Kappa Literary Society. After graduation, he moved to Talbot County, Georgia, where he studied law under the mentorship of future Georgia governor George W. Towns.

== Lawyer, planter and judge ==
After being admitted to the bar in 1835 (at the age of 21) in Muscogee County, Georgia (whose only town and county seat is Columbus). He made that area his home for the rest of his life. From 1837 to 1839, Benning became the solicitor general for Columbus, then married as discussed below. In the 1840 federal census, Benning owned 20 slaves in Muscogee County. A decade later, Benning owned 60 slaves in that county. By 1860, he had become a judge of the county's superior court.

== Politician ==
In 1840, Benning began his political career, but failed to secure a seat in the Georgia General Assembly. However, he remained politically active, and became an ardent secessionist, bitterly opposing abolition and the emancipation of slaves. In a letter to Howell Cobb written in July 1849, he stated that a Southern Confederacy would not be enough because it might itself eventually become divided into northern and southern regions as slavery waned in some of the states, and he called for a Southern "consolidated Republic" that "will put slavery under the control of those most interested in it."

In 1850, Benning became one of the Georgians who gathered with representatives of eight other slaveholding states in Nashville, Tennessee to ponder actions should Congress stop slavery's expansion westward into new territories. However, the Compromise of 1850 stopped that secession movement. In 1851, he was nominated for the U.S. Congress as a Southern rights Democrat but again failed to win election.

In 1853, he was elected an associate justice of the Georgia Supreme Court. The following year, Benning authored Padelford v. Savannah (1854), and claimed that state supreme courts could decided constitutional issues on "coordinate and co-equal" basis with the U.S. Supreme Court This "state's right" position received support in the South

Benning led Georgia's delegation to the Democratic National Convention in 1860, and led his delegation in walking out of the convention when delegates failed to insert a plank supporting slavery into the national party's platform. This split within the Democratic party effectively delivered the general election to the opposing Republican Party.

Following the election of Abraham Lincoln to the U.S. presidency in 1860 on a platform opposing the expansion of slavery into the territories (but promising not to interfere with the institution where it currently existed), Benning on November 19, 1860 addressed Georgia's legislature and urged secession. When legislators authorized a secession convention, Benning represented Muscogee County and briefly presided as delegates elected George W. Crawford as the convention's president, then helped draft the state's secession ordinance.

In March 1861, the Southern states that had seceded appointed special commissioners to travel to the other slaveholding Southern states that had yet to secede. Benning was the commissioner from Georgia to the Virginia secession convention, and tried to persuade Virginia politicians to vote to join Georgia in seceding from the Union. In a February 1861 speech to the Virginia secession convention, Benning gave his reasoning for the urging of secession from the Union, appealing to ethnic prejudices and pro-slavery sentiments to present his case and saying that were the slave states to remain in the Union their slaves would ultimately end up being freed by the anti-slavery Republican Party. He stated that he would rather be stricken with illness and starvation than see African Americans liberated from slavery and be given equality as citizens:

What was the reason that induced Georgia to take the step of secession? This reason may be summed up in one single proposition. It was a conviction, a deep conviction on the part of Georgia, that a separation from the North was the only thing that could prevent the abolition of her slavery.... If things are allowed to go on as they are, it is certain that slavery is to be abolished. By the time the North shall have attained the power, the black race will be in a large majority, and then we will have black governors, black legislatures, black juries, black everything. Is it to be supposed that the white race will stand for that? It is not a supposable case.... War will break out everywhere like hidden fire from the earth, and it is probable that the white race, being superior in every respect, may push the other back.... We will be overpowered and our men will be compelled to wander like vagabonds all over the earth; and as for our women, the horrors of their state we cannot contemplate in imagination. That is the fate which abolition will bring upon the white race.... We will be completely exterminated, and the land will be left in the possession of the blacks, and then it will go back to a wilderness and become another Africa.... Suppose they elevated Charles Sumner to the presidency? Suppose they elevated Fred Douglass, your escaped slave, to the presidency? What would be your position in such an event? I say give me pestilence and famine sooner than that.

— Henry Lewis Benning, Speech of Henry Benning to the Virginia Convention, February 18, 1861.

== American Civil War ==
Although he was considered for a cabinet position in the government of the newly established Confederacy, he chose to join the Confederate army instead. Benning recruited the 17th Georgia Infantry, a regiment. On August 29, 1861, those troops elected him as their colonel. The regiment became part of Robert Toombs's brigade in the right wing of the Army of Northern Virginia, under General Robert E. Lee.

As a newly minted army officer, Benning immediately ran into political difficulty. He questioned the legality of the Confederate government's Conscription Act and spoke against it openly as a violation of states' rights. Refusing to obey certain orders, he came close to being court-martialed, but influence from his friend, Colonel T. R. R. Cobb, defused the situation. The first significant action he saw was at the Second Battle of Bull Run in August 1862. At the Battle of Antietam, Benning's brigade was a crucial part in the defense of the Confederate right flank, guarding "Burnside's Bridge" across Antietam Creek all morning against repeated Union assaults. His courage in battle was no longer questioned by his superiors, and he became known as the "Old Rock" to his men. He was promoted to brigadier general on April 23, 1863, with date of rank of January 17, 1863.

For most of the rest of the war, Benning continued as a brigade commander ("Benning's Brigade") in the division of the aggressive John Bell Hood of Texas. He missed the Confederate victory at the Battle of Chancellorsville because his brigade was stationed in southern Virginia along with the rest of Lieutenant General James Longstreet's First Corps. However, it returned for active combat in the Battle of Gettysburg. There, on July 2, 1863, Benning led his brigade in a furious assault against the Union position in the Devil's Den, driving out the defenders at no small cost to themselves. That September, Longstreet's Corps was sent west to assist General Braxton Bragg's Army of Tennessee. On the second day of the bloody Battle of Chickamauga, Benning participated in Longstreet's massive charge against a gap in the Union line even as his horse was shot out from under him. He mounted another horse, which was also killed. Finally, he cut loose a horse from a nearby artillery battery and rode into combat bareback. During a surprise Union counterattack against his brigade, many of his men fled, and Benning ran off to Longstreet to report the calamity. Riding an old artillery horse and whipping it with a piece of rope, Benning was "greatly excited and the very picture of despair," as was reported by Longstreet after the war. Benning said, "General, I am ruined; my brigade was suddenly attacked and every man killed; not one is to be found. Please give me orders where I can do some fighting." Longstreet responded impassively, "Nonsense, General, you are not so badly hurt. Look about you. I know you will find at least one man, and with him on his feet report your brigade to me, and you two shall have a place in the fighting line." Longstreet's reply humiliated Benning but instilled enough determination in him to return to find his brigade and prevail in the battle.

Benning's Brigade fought at the Battle of Wauhatchie outside Chattanooga, Tennessee, and joined Longstreet's Corps in its unsuccessful Knoxville Campaign in late 1863. Returning to Virginia, the brigade fought against Union Lieutenant General Ulysses S. Grant in the 1864 Overland Campaign, where Benning was severely wounded in the left shoulder during the Battle of the Wilderness on May 5. That wound kept him out of the remainder of the campaign and much of the subsequent Siege of Petersburg, but he was able to return in time for the waning days of that lengthy campaign. His brigade withstood strong Union assaults against its entrenchments but was forced to withdraw along with the rest of Lee's army in the retreat to Appomattox Court House in early April 1865. Benning, heartbroken, was one of the final officers to lead his men to the surrender ceremony.

== Postwar legal practice ==
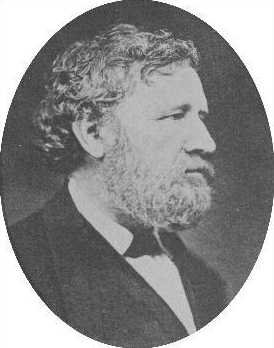
Benning in his later life

After the war, Benning returned to Columbus to resume the practice of law. He found that his house had been burned, his bondsmen left, and all of his savings had disappeared. Further, he had to support, along with his own family, the widow and children of his wife's brother, who had been killed in the war.

== Personal life ==
On September 12, 1839, Benning married Mary Howard Jones of Columbus, Georgia. Mary was the daughter of the Honorable Seaborn Jones, a prominent attorney, former Georgia Secretary of State, and United States Representative. The couple had ten children during their twenty-nine year marriage, including an infant son who died within hours of birth and three daughters who died of childhood diseases. Five Benning daughters survived their parents. Daughter Louise married Samuel Spencer, a railroad executive.

Years before Margaret Mitchell published her Civil War novel, Gone with the Wind, she wrote an article in the Atlanta Constitution (December 20, 1925) in which she referenced the Benning family and their experiences during the war.

Regarding Mary Benning, Mitchell wrote, "She was a tiny woman, frail and slight, but possessed of unusual endurance and a lion’s heart. The battles she fought at home were those of nearly every Southern woman, but her burdens were heavier than most. Left in complete charge of a large plantation, this little woman, who was the mother of ten children, was as brave a soldier at home as ever her husband was on the Virginia battlefields. She saw to it that the crops were gathered, the children fed and clothed, and the Negroes cared for. To her fell the work of superintending the weaving and spinning of enough cloth, not only to clothe her own children and servants, but also Confederate soldiers. While her husband was away she buried her aged father, whose end was hastened by the war."

Many of her descriptions of the Bennings are reflected in the lives of the O'Haras and others in the novel.

== Death and legacy ==
On his way to a court appearance on July 10, 1875, Benning had a stroke (termed apoplexy at the time). He died in Columbus and was buried in Linwood Cemetery. He had survived his wife, Mary Benning, by about seven years. His firstborn son, Seaborn Jones Benning, had died of consumption on December 12, 1874.

In 1918, at the request of the Columbus Rotary Club, the U.S. Army named its new U.S. Army Infantry School in Muscogee County Fort Benning. During World War II, a Liberty ship was named in honor of Benning. The SS Henry L. Benning, United States Merchant Marine 0946, was built in Baltimore, Maryland and went into service on March 9, 1943. The ship hauled cargo and troops throughout the Pacific theater.

In 2020, during the George Floyd protests, there were renewed calls to rename U.S. Army installations named after Confederate soldiers, including Fort Benning. Fort Benning was renamed Fort Moore, after Vietnam War era Lieutenant General Hal Moore Jr. and his wife, Julia as of May 11, 2023. It became the only base named for a married couple. However, in March 2025 it resumed its former name, although now officially honoring an unrelated soldier, Corporal Fred G. Benning of Neligh, Nebraska, who received the Distinguished Service Cross for heroics in 1918 during World War I.

== See also ==
- List of Confederate States Army generals
- List of signers of the Georgia Ordinance of Secession
