= Kingston Saltpeter Cave =

Cave in Georgia, United States

Coordinates: 34.204636°N 84.914883°W

Kingston Saltpeter Cave is the largest cave in Bartow County, Georgia, United States. It was formerly used as a source of saltpeter, the critical oxidizing component of gunpowder, by the Confederate States of America during the American Civil War (1861–1865). The cave is now a preserved area composed of 40 acres of largely hardwood forest, underlain by a variety of wildflowers and mosses.

In late 1983 the property was acquired by the Felburn Foundation in order to preserve, maintain, and protect it for future generations.

== General references ==
- Sneed, Joel M., (2007), Bartow County Caves: History Underground in North Georgia, 161 pp.
- Sneed, Joel M. and Larry O. Blair, eds., (2005), The Late Pleistocene Record of Kingston Saltpeter Cave, Bartow County, Georgia
