= Euharlee Creek =

Coordinates: 34°08′39″N 84°55′31″W

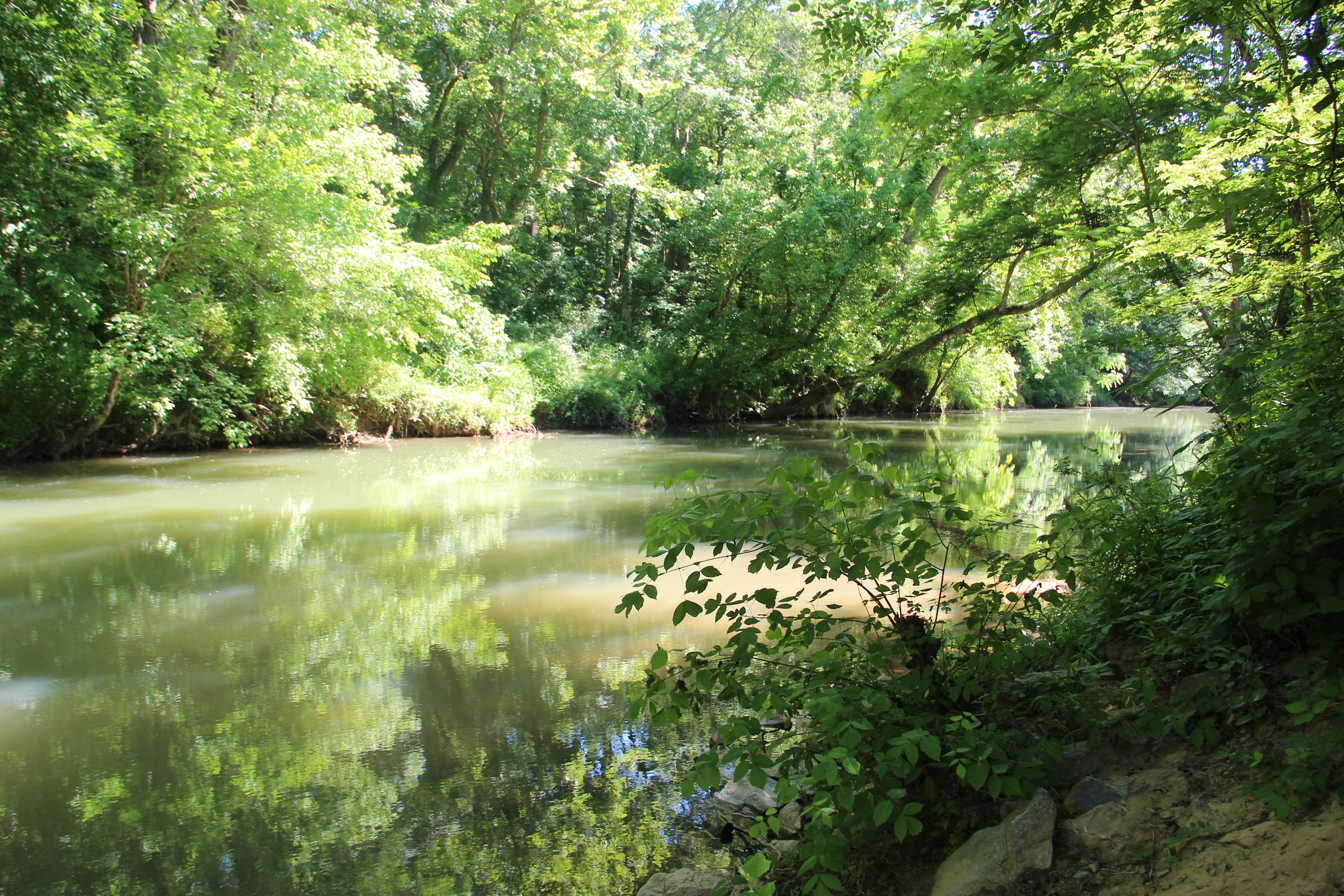
Euharlee Creek near Euharlee

Euharlee Creek is a 21-mile-long (34 km) waterway which traverses across two counties in Georgia, USA: Bartow County and Polk County. It begins in Polk County near the city of Rockmart and joins the Etowah River in Euharlee. The historic Euharlee Covered Bridge spans Euharlee Creek.

Euharlee Creek was named after a Cherokee tribe.
