= National Register of Historic Places listings in Macon County, Alabama =

Location of Macon County in Alabama

This is a list of the National Register of Historic Places listings in Macon County, Alabama.

This is intended to be a complete list of the properties and districts on the National Register of Historic Places in Macon County, Alabama, United States. Latitude and longitude coordinates are provided for many National Register properties and districts; these locations may be seen together in an online map.

There are 16 properties and districts listed on the National Register in the county, including two National Historic Landmarks.

This National Park Service list is complete through NPS recent listings posted May 1, 2026.

== Current listings ==
	Name on the Register	Image	Date listed	Location	City or town	Description
1	Archeological Site No. 1MC110		December 14, 1985 (#85003118)	Address Restricted	Tuskegee	
2	Atasi Site		April 18, 1977 (#77000210)	Address Restricted	Shorter	
3	Butler Chapel African Methodist Episcopal Zion Church	Butler Chapel African Methodist Episcopal Zion Church	August 28, 1995 (#95001022)	1002 N. Church St. 32°25′07″N 85°41′58″W	Tuskegee	
4	Creek Stand A.M.E. Zion Church Cemetery	Creek Stand A.M.E. Zion Church Cemetery	April 26, 2016 (#15000432)	Slim Rd. off County Road 10; 32°17′24″N 85°29′23″W	Creek Stand	
5	Creekwood	Creekwood	April 13, 1989 (#89000310)	Society Hill Rd., 0.4 miles (0.64 km) north of County Highway 10; 32°18′00″N 85°28′46″W	Creek Stand	c. 1844
6	Grey Columns	Grey Columns	January 11, 1980 (#80000364)	399 Old Montgomery Rd. 32°25′27″N 85°41′59″W	Tuskegee	Built in 1857, Grey Columns now serves as the home of the president of Tuskegee University.
7	Macon County Courthouse	Macon County Courthouse	November 17, 1978 (#78000495)	E. Northside and N. Main Sts. 32°25′28″N 85°41′27″W	Tuskegee	
8	Macon County High School	Macon County High School	November 16, 2020 (#100005781)	500 East Main St. 32°33′38″N 85°39′45″W	Notasulga	Currently serves as Notasulga High School
9	Main Street Historic District	Main Street Historic District	March 12, 1984 (#84000650)	Main St. 32°25′22″N 85°41′23″W	Tuskegee	
10	North Main Street Historic District	North Main Street Historic District	March 7, 1985 (#85000445)	600, 615, and 616 N. Main, 101 and 110 E. Water, 700 Water, 701 Maple, and 811 N. Maple Sts. 32°25′46″N 85°41′40″W	Tuskegee	
11	St. Paul Baptist Church and Armstrong School		July 5, 2023 (#100009106)	14650 Cty. Rd. 2; 32°14′23″N 85°40′28″W	Tuskegee vicinity	
12	Shiloh Missionary Baptist Church and Rosenwald School	Shiloh Missionary Baptist Church and Rosenwald School	August 6, 2010 (#10000522)	7 Shiloh Rd. 32°31′41″N 85°40′40″W	Notasulga	
13	Shiloh Missionary Baptist Church Cemetery	Shiloh Missionary Baptist Church Cemetery	April 5, 2016 (#15000433)	State Route 81 at Pistol Range Rd. 32°31′08″N 85°40′55″W	Notasulga	
14	Tuskegee Airmen National Historic Site	Tuskegee Airmen National Historic Site	November 6, 1998 (#01000284)	c/o Tuskegee Institute, PO Drawer 10; 32°27′33″N 85°40′48″W	Tuskegee	National Historic Landmark District, historic training site for African-American pilots and crewmen during World War II (before the US Air Force was a separate branch of the service and before desegregation).
15	Tuskegee Institute National Historic Site	Tuskegee Institute National Historic Site	October 15, 1966 (#66000151)	1 mile (1.6 km) northwest of Tuskegee on U.S. Route 80; 32°25′49″N 85°42′28″W	Tuskegee	One of the best-known historically black colleges and universities in the United States, Tuskegee was founded by Booker T. Washington in 1881. It began with a curriculum designed to provide industrial and vocational education to African Americans and featured such acclaimed educators as George Washington Carver. Tuskegee Institute is also a National Historic Landmark.
16	Tuskegee Veterans Administration Hospital	Tuskegee Veterans Administration Hospital	March 19, 2012 (#12000140)	2400 Hospital Rd. 32°26′43″N 85°42′47″W	Tuskegee	Part of the United States' second generation of veterans hospitals; multiple property submission.

== See also ==
- List of National Historic Landmarks in Alabama
- National Register of Historic Places listings in Alabama
