= List of people from Tuskegee, Alabama =

The people listed below were all born in, residents of, or otherwise closely associated with Tuskegee, Alabama:

== Activism ==
- Rosa Parks, African American civil rights activist
- Thomas Reed, African American Alabama NAACP president, state politician and civil rights activist
- Sammy Younge Jr., Civil Rights Movement activist and voting rights activist

== Art ==
- Frederick Arthur Bridgman, artist known for his paintings of "Orientalist" subjects

== Athletics ==
- Cleveland "Cleve" Abbott, coach
- Alice Coachman, first African American female Olympic gold medalist, high jump
- Herman Hill, former Major League Baseball player
- Stanley Jackson, former NBA player
- Ken Johnson, former forward for the Portland Trail Blazers
- Rimp Lanier, former Major League Baseball player
- Chad Lucas, professional football wide receiver
- Zeke Moore, former cornerback for the Houston Oilers
- Chukie Nwokorie, former NFL player
- James Patrick, Canadian football safety
- Gilbert Renfroe, former professional football quarterback
- Gerald Robinson, former Auburn University and NFL defensive end
- Andre Thornton, major league baseball player
- Tony Tolbert, former defensive end for the Dallas Cowboys
- Frank Walker, NFL cornerback
- Rory White, NBA player for the Phoenix Suns, San Diego/Los Angeles Clippers, and the Milwaukee Bucks
- Willie Whitehead, former Auburn University and NFL defensive end

== Education ==
- Howard R. Lamar, historian of the American West and a former president of Yale University
- Booker T. Washington, educator, author, orator, and leader in the African-American community

== Government ==
- Eric Motley, former U.S. State Department official and director of the Aspen Institute
- Frank Park, U.S. representative for Georgia's 2nd congressional district from 1913 to 1925
- Edward W. Pou, U.S. representative from North Carolina's 4th District from 1901 to 1934
- Charles Winston Thompson, U.S. representative from 1901 to 1904
- Myron Herbert Thompson, senior judge for the United States District Court for the Middle District of Alabama
- Michael L. Vaughn, politician who represents District 24 in the Maryland House of Delegates
- Otis D. Wright II, U.S. district judge on the United States District Court for the Central District of California

== Literature ==
- Clarissa Scott Delany, poet, essayist, educator and social worker associated with the Harlem Renaissance
- Sadie Peterson Delaney, chief librarian of the Tuskegee Veterans Administration Medical Center for 34 years and a pioneer in bibliotherapy
- Angela Johnson, poet and writer of children's books
- Nella Larsen, author of the Harlem Renaissance
- Phyllis Alesia Perry, novelist and journalist

== Military ==
- Theodore W. Brevard, Jr., officer in the Confederate States Army
- William A. Campbell, member of the Tuskegee Airmen
- Lt Gen Russell C. Davis, former commanding general of the District of Columbia National Guard
- Evander McIvor Law, American Civil War general
- The Tuskegee Airmen

== Music ==
- Dave Edwards, multireedist and lead alto saxophonist for the Lawrence Welk Show
- Tom Joyner, nationally syndicated radio DJ
- Lionel Richie, graduated from Tuskegee University, rhythm & blues singer, songwriter, musician, record producer and occasional actor
- Caughey Roberts, jazz alto sax player best known for his time in the Count Basie Orchestra in the 1930s

== Science ==
- Keith Black, neurosurgeon
- George Washington Carver, botanist
- Adriel Johnson, biologist and faculty member at the University of Alabama in Huntsville who was killed in a mass shooting

== Television ==
- Robin Roberts, anchor of Good Morning America
- Juel Taylor, director and screenwriter
- Keenen Ivory Wayans, actor, comedian, writer, director
