= Sadie Delaney =

Sadie Delaney may refer to:

- Sadie Peterson Delaney, (1889-1953) African-American librarian and bibliophile
- Sadie Delany, (born Sarah Louise Delaney) African-American educator and civil rights pioneer
