= Creekwood =

- U.S. National Register of Historic Places
- Alabama Register of Landmarks and Heritage
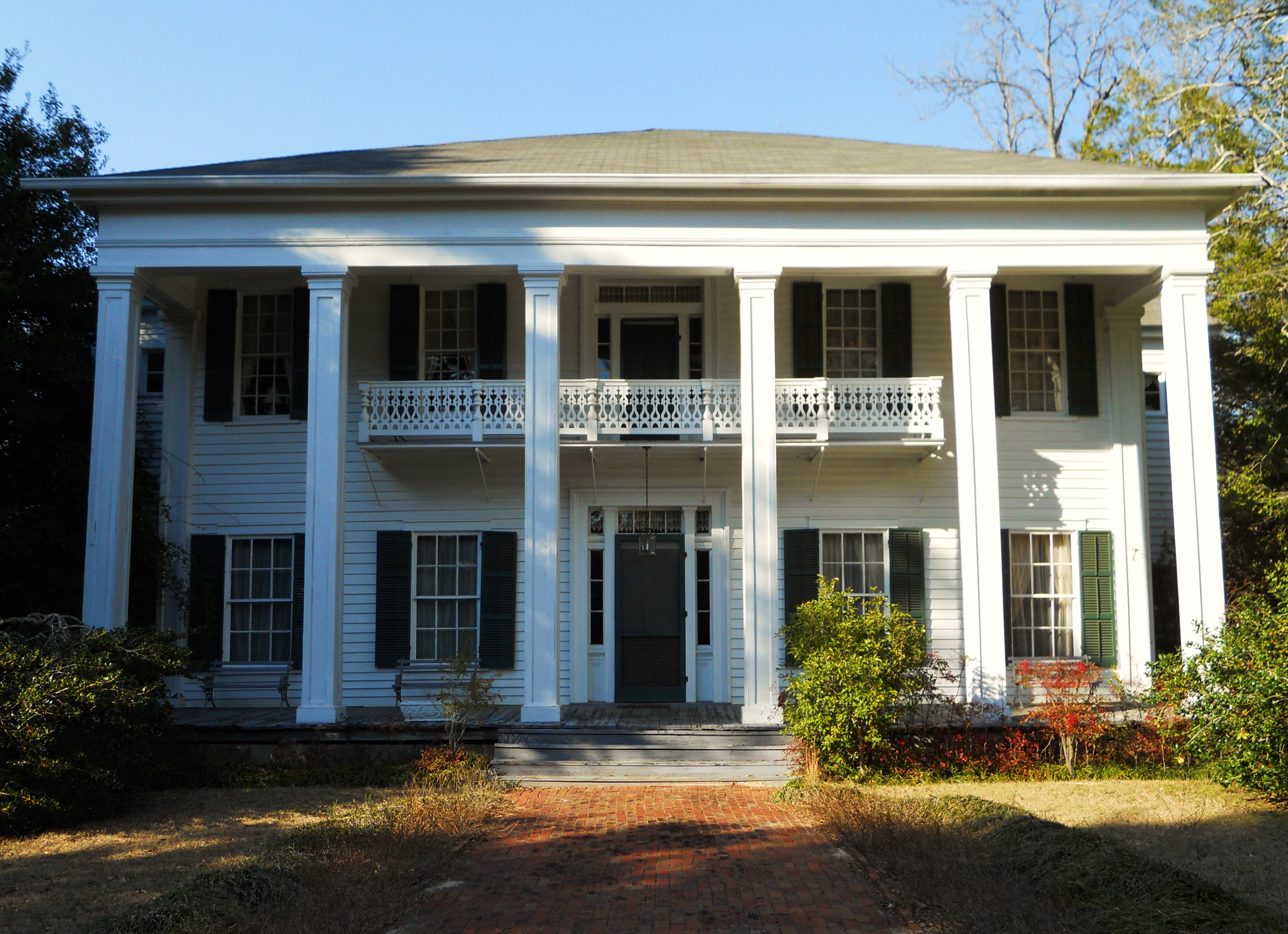

- Location within Alabama
- Location: Society Hill Rd., 0.4 miles (0.64 km) north of County Highway 10, near Creekstand, Alabama
- Coordinates: 32°18′00″N 85°28′46″W
- Area: 5 acres (2.0 ha)
- Built: c. 1850, 1920s
- Architectural style: Greek Revival
- NRHP reference No.: 89000310

Significant dates
- Added to NRHP: April 13, 1989
- Designated ARLH: February 15, 1977

Creekwood, near Creekstand, Alabama, was built c. 1844. It was listed on the National Register of Historic Places in 1989. The listing included two contributing buildings.

It is a two-story, four-over-four plan house on brick and mortar piers. In the 1920s it was expanded with a two-story wing on the west and a one-story wing on the north. It has a full façade porch with Tuscan columns, and a 3/4 width upper story balustraded balcony.
