= Tuskegee, Alabama =

City in Alabama, United States

- City
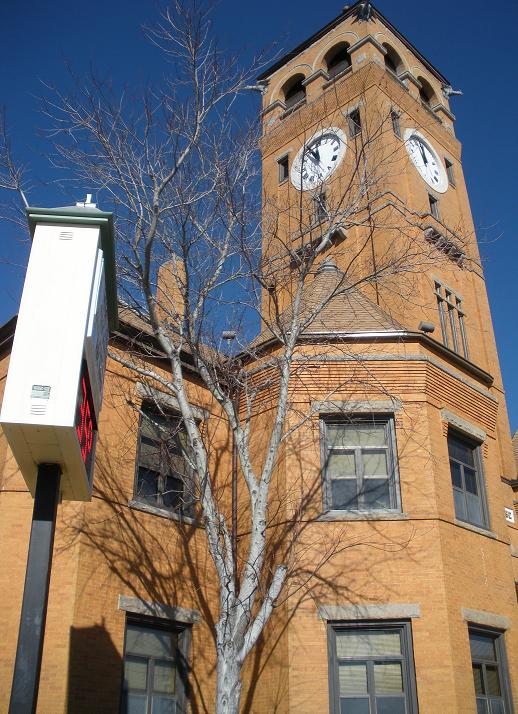
- Macon County Courthouse

- Flag Seal
- Nickname: The Pride of the Swift Growing South
- Location of Tuskegee in Macon County, Alabama
- Coordinates: 32°28′20″N 85°44′52″W
- Country: United States
- State: Alabama
- County: Macon
- Founded: 1833
- Incorporated: February 13, 1843

Government
  - Type: Mayor–Council

Area
  - City: 17.331 sq mi (44.887 km^{2})
  - Land: 17.060 sq mi (44.185 km^{2})
  - Water: 0.271 sq mi (0.702 km^{2})
- Elevation: 410 ft (120 m)

Population (2020)
  - City: 9,395
  - Estimate (2023): 8,765
  - Density: 513.8/sq mi (198.39/km^{2})
  - Urban: 9,003
  - Metro: 18,370
- Time zone: UTC−6 (Central (CST))
  - Summer (DST): UTC−5 (CDT)
- ZIP Code: 36083
- Area code: 334
- FIPS code: 01-77304
- GNIS feature ID: 2405617
- Sales tax: 11.5%
- Website: tuskegeealabama.gov

Tuskegee (/tʌsˈkiːɡiː/ tus-KEE-ghee) is a city in and the county seat of Macon County, Alabama, United States. The population was 9,395 at the 2020 census, and was estimated to be 8,765 in 2023. It is the most populous city in Macon County.

Creek War General Thomas Simpson Woodward founded the city in 1833. Before the American Civil War, the area was developed for cotton plantations, dependent on enslaved African American people. After the war, many freedmen continued to work on plantations in the rural area, which was devoted to agriculture, primarily cotton as a commodity crop.

In 1881, the Tuskegee Normal School (now Tuskegee University, a historically black college) was founded by Lewis Adams, a former slave whose father, white slave owner Jesse Adams, had allowed him to be educated. Its first founding principal was Booker T. Washington, who developed a national reputation and philanthropic network to support the education of freedmen and their children. In 1923, the Tuskegee Veterans Administration Medical Center was established, initially for the estimated 300,000 African-American veterans of World War I in the South, when public facilities were racially segregated. Twenty-seven buildings were constructed on the 464-acre campus.

The city was the subject of a civil rights case, Gomillion v. Lightfoot (1960), in which the United States Supreme Court ruled that the state legislature had violated the Fifteenth Amendment in 1957 by gerrymandering city boundaries as a 28-sided figure that excluded nearly all black voters and residents, and none of the white voters or residents. The city's boundaries were restored in 1961 after the ruling.

== Etymology ==
The name "Tuskegee" comes from Spanish Tasquiqui, which came from the Muskogee word Taskēke, meaning "warriors". The Native American town of Tasquique was located on the Chattahoochee River just south of present-day Columbus, Georgia.

== History ==
The Creek people long occupied this area, including a settlement known as Taskigi Town. After Congress passed the Indian Removal Act of 1830 in furtherance of U.S. President Andrew Jackson's goals, most of the Creek bands were removed from their homelands in the Southeast to Indian Territory west of the Mississippi River. Pioneer white planters and other migrants moved into the area, mostly from eastern Southern states. The planters brought or purchased enslaved African Americans to clear woods and develop cotton plantations. Invention of the cotton gin had made short-staple cotton profitable to process, and it became the chief commodity crop of the Deep South through the 19th century.

General Thomas Simpson Woodward, a Creek War veteran under Jackson, laid out the city in 1833. It became the county seat in the same year, and it was incorporated on February 13, 1843.

=== Late 19th century ===
In 1881, the young Booker T. Washington was hired to develop the Tuskegee Normal School for Colored Teachers on the grounds of a former plantation. It was founded to train teachers for the segregated school system and freedmen for self-sufficiency. Washington established a work-study program by which students practiced skills and trades. Over the decades, the programs were expanded. This was later named the Tuskegee Institute. Graduate courses were added and it became Tuskegee University.

Washington was known for his emphasis on education and self-improvement. The institute became known for stressing a practical education with work experience by students, to prepare them for the agricultural and mechanical work available in the small towns and rural areas to which most would return. Teaching was a highly respected calling, as education was a major goal among the freedmen and their children. Washington believed that African Americans would achieve acceptance by Southern whites when they had raised themselves.

Washington led the school for decades, building a wide national network of white industrialist donors among some of the major philanthropists of the era, including George Eastman. At the same time, Washington secretly provided funding for its legal defense of some highly visible civil rights cases, including supporting challenges to Southern states' discriminatory constitutions and practices that disenfranchised African Americans. Washington worked with Julius Rosenwald and architects at the college to develop models for rural schools, to be used with Rosenwald's matching funds to build more schools for black children in the South.

=== Early 20th century ===
Beginning in 1932, the school was the site of the now-infamous Tuskegee Syphilis Study (1932–1972), started to test treatments of the disease. 600 African-American men became involved, being offered free medical care by the U.S. government for their participation, while being unwittingly tested for syphilis. With funding cut by the Great Depression, staff cut back on medication to treat the disease and studied the effects of untreated syphilis on patients and their sexual partners. Those in the study who had syphilis were not told, nor were they informed that treatment was available for their disease, even after antibiotics had been developed.

One of the most famous teachers at Tuskegee was George Washington Carver, whose name is synonymous with innovative research into Southern farming methods and the development of hundreds of commercial products derived from regional crops, including peanuts and sweet potatoes.

During World War II, Tuskegee and Tuskegee Institute were also home to the famed Tuskegee Airmen. This was the first squadron of African-American pilots trained in the U.S. Military for service in that war.

Tuskegee University in the 21st century is a center of excellence for African-American education. The heart of the university has been designated as a National Historic District and was listed on the National Register of Historic Places in 1974.

The Tuskegee Veterans Administration Medical Center was opened in 1923, authorized by Congress. A total of 27 buildings were constructed on the 464-acre campus, which provided housing and a hospital to serve the needs of more than 300,000 African-American veterans in the South from World War I. It attracted doctors from top schools, such as Dr. Toussaint Tourgee Tildon, a graduate of Harvard Medical School. He was one of the first six African-American doctors to work at the hospital; as director of the complex for 12 years (1946–1958), he achieved accreditation for a medical residency program at the hospital. He also worked to ensure accessibility for graduates to good medical positions in the federal government.

In the 1930s, a group of black men from the Tuskegee Men's Club began efforts to get more black voters registered. Beginning in 1941, the group reorganized under the name the Tuskegee Civic Association (TCA). With the group's consistent effort to register more voters, the area's statistics of registered black voters continued to increase. The group and potential voters were often met with obstacles that prevented them from being successful. The surrounding black community showed support and wanted to recognize black leaders in the community. The work of the TCA also had a huge emphasis on educating their communities on various civic duties. Though the existing support for the TCA was not often vocalized, many black community members wanted to challenge the political system that was present in Macon County. The group shed a light on the disparities in the numbers of black people applying for voter registration and those who were successful, even going as far as talking to the United States Commission on Civil Rights.

=== Voting rights challenge ===
Following passage of the Civil Rights Act of 1957, activists made progress in registering black voters in the city. African Americans in Tuskegee and other Alabama cities had been largely disenfranchised after passage of a new state constitution in 1901, which included requirements that were discriminatory in practice, including a poll tax and literacy tests.

In 1957, a total of 1000 voters were registered, with the 400 registered black voters nearly equaling the number of white voters. But in the city, African Americans outnumbered whites on a four-to-one basis; among them were many highly educated, professional African Americans working at the Tuskegee Institute and the Veterans Administration hospital. That year, without debate and against the protests of many African Americans, the state legislature redrew the boundaries of the city, enacting Local Law 140, which created an irregular, 28-sided city boundary that left only ten black voters within the newly defined city, and excluded 420 black voters. Those excluded included the entire professional staff of the Institute and the hospital. No white voters were excluded by the change.

The law was intended to guarantee that minority whites could retain control of the city even if more blacks succeeded in the arduous process of registering to vote. Some 3,000 African-American residents protested passage of the law at a church in Tuskegee; they also began an economic boycott of white businesses in the city. They referred to the boycott as a "selective buying campaign" due to the fact that boycotting was illegal under state law. It lasted about four years, during which twenty-six businesses operated by white proprietors closed down.

African Americans also organized a legal challenge to the law, supported by the NAACP, in a case known as Gomillion v. Lightfoot. The law was initially upheld by the US District Court and affirmed by the Appeals Court based in New Orleans. However, it was struck down by the US Supreme Court in 1960, with the ruling implemented in 1961. The court ruled that the gerrymandering of city boundaries was racially motivated and violated the Fifteenth Amendment to the United States Constitution which states that "states were not insulated from federal judicial review when they jeopardized federally protected rights." The exclusionary gerrymandering was overturned and the previous boundaries of the city were restored.

This case was cited in the later Baker v. Carr (1964), in which the Supreme Court ruled that Tennessee's malapportionment of election districts violated civil rights. It ruled that representation in both houses of all state legislatures had to be based on population, under the "one man, one vote" doctrine, and that such districts had to be regularly updated to reflect population changes.

=== Post-Gomillion ===
In 1963, Tuskegee was to have been the first Alabama community to comply with a federal order to desegregate its public schools. The school superintendent, C.A. (Hardboy) Pruitt, at first opposed the admission of Black students, but worked with other community leaders to comply with the final order of the federal district court, with plans to admit 13 Black students in September 1963 to what had been an all-white high school. But Gov. George Wallace opposed compliance with the federal order anywhere in the state on the grounds that it would lead to violence. Behind the scenes, Wallace enlisted the aid of Ku Klux Klan members and neo-Nazis of the National States' Rights Party to gin up protests calling for the closing of schools that were scheduled to integrate. Wallace subsequently ordered public schools closed across the state and deployed state troopers on September 3, 1963, to block the opening of Tuskegee High School. The school was integrated on September 10, 1963, after President John F. Kennedy federalized the Alabama National Guard and 13 Black students were among only 165 students to begin the school year, against a total enrollment of about 550.

Lucius Amerson made history in 1966 by becoming the first Black sheriff to be elected in the state of Alabama, and the American South, since Reconstruction. He was sworn in as Macon County Sheriff in January 1967. Amerson served four terms as Sheriff until 1987.

Johnny Ford was elected the first black mayor of the city in 1972, and served six consecutive terms in office. Lucenia Williams Dunn was elected the first black woman mayor in 2000.

== Geography ==
According to the United States Census Bureau, the city has a total area of 17.331 square miles (44.89 km^{2}), of which, 17.060 square miles (44.19 km^{2}) is land and 0.271 square miles (0.70 km^{2}) (1.56%) is water.

=== Climate ===
According to the Köppen climate classification, Tuskegee has a humid subtropical climate (abbreviated Cfa).

Climate data for Tuskegee, 1991–2020 simulated normals (453 ft elevation)
Month	Jan	Feb	Mar	Apr	May	Jun	Jul	Aug	Sep	Oct	Nov	Dec	Year
Mean daily maximum °F (°C)	56.8 (13.8)	61.2 (16.2)	68.7 (20.4)	75.7 (24.3)	82.9 (28.3)	88.3 (31.3)	90.9 (32.7)	90.1 (32.3)	86.0 (30.0)	77.0 (25.0)	66.9 (19.4)	59.2 (15.1)	75.3 (24.1)
Daily mean °F (°C)	45.7 (7.6)	49.3 (9.6)	56.1 (13.4)	63.0 (17.2)	71.1 (21.7)	77.7 (25.4)	80.6 (27.0)	79.9 (26.6)	75.2 (24.0)	64.9 (18.3)	54.5 (12.5)	48.2 (9.0)	63.9 (17.7)
Mean daily minimum °F (°C)	34.5 (1.4)	37.6 (3.1)	43.5 (6.4)	50.4 (10.2)	59.4 (15.2)	67.1 (19.5)	70.2 (21.2)	69.6 (20.9)	64.4 (18.0)	53.1 (11.7)	42.1 (5.6)	37.0 (2.8)	52.4 (11.3)
Average precipitation inches (mm)	4.87 (123.74)	4.88 (124.04)	5.15 (130.74)	4.42 (112.36)	3.82 (97.11)	4.49 (113.96)	4.92 (125.08)	4.35 (110.46)	3.68 (93.35)	3.19 (81.14)	4.19 (106.38)	5.31 (134.95)	53.27 (1,353.31)
Average dew point °F (°C)	36.5 (2.5)	39.0 (3.9)	43.9 (6.6)	51.3 (10.7)	60.1 (15.6)	67.5 (19.7)	70.7 (21.5)	70.2 (21.2)	65.3 (18.5)	55.0 (12.8)	45.0 (7.2)	39.9 (4.4)	53.7 (12.0)
Source: PRISM Climate Group

== Demographics ==
Historical population
Census	Pop.	Note	%±
1850	1,563		—
1880	2,370		—
1890	1,803		−23.9%
1900	2,170		20.4%
1910	2,803		29.2%
1920	2,475		−11.7%
1930	3,314		33.9%
1940	3,937		18.8%
1950	6,712		70.5%
1960	7,240		7.9%
1970	11,028		52.3%
1980	13,327		20.8%
1990	12,257		−8.0%
2000	11,846		−3.4%
2010	9,865		−16.7%
2020	9,395		−4.8%
2023 (est.)	8,765	▼	−6.7%
U.S. Decennial Census; 2020 Census

The table at right shows the effects of the state passing a law in 1957 to redefine the city of Tuskegee in a way that excluded nearly all black residents, dramatically reducing the population by 1960. The city and other officials were sued under Gomillion v. Lightfoot (1960); the US Supreme Court ruled against the state's action. The city boundaries were reinstituted, as reflected by the dramatic "increase" of population in the city recorded in 1970. The population in 1960, with the restored borders, was 7,240, according to the 1970 U.S. Census. Because of lack of economic opportunities in the largely rural area, both the city and rural county have lost population since the late 20th century.

As of the 2023 American Community Survey, there are 2,986 estimated households in Tuskegee with an average of 2.21 persons per household. The city has a median household income of $38,160. Approximately 26.9% of the city's population lives at or below the poverty line. Tuskegee has an estimated 49.0% employment rate, with 28.1% of the population holding a bachelor's degree or higher and 86.5% holding a high school diploma.

The top five reported ancestries (people were allowed to report up to two ancestries, thus the figures will generally add to more than 100%) were English (98.4%), Spanish (1.1%), Indo-European (0.5%), Asian and Pacific Islander (0.0%), and Other (0.0%).

The median age in the city was 23.6 years.

=== Racial and ethnic composition ===
Tuskegee, Alabama – racial and ethnic composition Note: the US Census treats Hispanic/Latino as an ethnic category. This table excludes Latinos from the racial categories and assigns them to a separate category. Hispanics/Latinos may be of any race.
Race / ethnicity (NH = non-Hispanic)	Pop. 2000	Pop. 2010	Pop. 2020	% 2000	% 2010	% 2020
White alone (NH)	298	173	171	2.52%	1.75%	1.82%
Black or African American alone (NH)	11,257	9,395	8,863	95.03%	95.24%	94.34%
Native American or Alaska Native alone (NH)	22	7	18	0.19%	0.07%	0.19%
Asian alone (NH)	82	50	59	0.69%	0.51%	0.63%
Native Hawaiian or Pacific Islander alone (NH)	1	0	4	0.01%	0.00%	0.04%
Other race alone (NH)	10	3	27	0.08%	0.03%	0.29%
Mixed race or multiracial (NH)	95	111	147	0.80%	1.13%	1.56%
Hispanic or Latino (any race)	81	126	106	0.68%	1.28%	1.13%
Total	11,846	9,865	9,395	100.00%	100.00%	100.00%

=== 2020 census ===
As of the 2020 census, there were 9,395 people, 3,603 households, and 1,747 families residing in the city.

The median age was 29.4 years. 14.8% of residents were under the age of 18, 4.7% were under 5 years of age, and 17.4% were 65 years of age or older. For every 100 females there were 70.3 males, and for every 100 females age 18 and over there were 66.0 males age 18 and over. The population was 42.6% male and 57.4% female.

The population density was 550.7 inhabitants per square mile (212.6/km^{2}). There were 4,603 housing units at an average density of 269.8 per square mile (104.2/km^{2}). 92.9% of residents lived in urban areas, while 7.1% lived in rural areas.

Of the city's households, 22.6% had children under the age of 18 living in them. Of all households, 15.6% were married-couple households, 25.9% were households with a male householder and no spouse or partner present, and 54.1% were households with a female householder and no spouse or partner present. About 44.4% of all households were made up of individuals, and 16.7% had someone living alone who was 65 years of age or older.

Of the city's housing units, 21.7% were vacant. The homeowner vacancy rate was 3.4% and the rental vacancy rate was 11.0%.

=== 2010 census ===
As of the 2010 census, there were 9,865 people, 3,749 households, and 1,956 families residing in the city. The population density was 613.0 inhabitants per square mile (236.7/km^{2}). There were 4,624 housing units at an average density of 287.4 per square mile (111.0/km^{2}). The racial makeup of the city was 1.94% White, 95.83% African American, 0.08% Native American, 0.51% Asian, 0.00% Pacific Islander, 0.31% from some other races and 1.33% from two or more races. Hispanic or Latino people of any race were 1.28% of the population.

There were 3,749 households, out of which 21.3% had children under the age of 18 living with them, 19.0% were married couples living together, 28.6% had a female householder with no husband present, and 47.8% were non-families. 40.1% of all households were made up of individuals, and 12.0% had someone living alone who was 65 years of age or older. The average household size was 2.17 and the average family size was 2.96.

In the city, the population was spread out, with 18.5% under the age of 18, 27.8% from 18 to 24, 18.9% from 25 to 44, 21.7% from 45 to 64, and 13.1% who were 65 years of age or older. The median age was 27.6 years. For every 100 females, there were 78.8 males. For every 100 females age 18 and over, there were 75.6 males.

The median income for a household in the city was $24,251, and the median income for a family was $43,472. Males had a median income of $40,653 versus $26,631 for females. The per capita income for the city was $15,471. About 22.2% of families and 31.6% of the population were below the poverty line, including 40.0% of those under age 18 and 10.2% of those age 65 or over.

=== 2000 census ===
As of the 2000 census, there were 11,846 people, 4,169 households, and 2,326 families residing in the city. The population density was 765.7 inhabitants per square mile (295.6/km^{2}). There were 5,101 housing units at an average density of 329.7 per square mile (127.3/km^{2}). The racial makeup of the city was 2.59% White, 95.48% African American, 0.19% Native American, 0.69% Asian, 0.01% Pacific Islander, 0.17% from some other races and 0.88% from two or more races. Hispanic or Latino people of any race were 0.68% of the population.

There were 4,169 households, out of which 27.4% had children under the age of 18 living with them, 22.6% were married couples living together, 29.0% had a female householder with no husband present, and 44.2% were non-families. 37.2% of all households were made up of individuals, and 13.3% had someone living alone who was 65 years of age or older. The average household size was 2.30 and the average family size was 3.06.

In the city, the population was spread out, with 22.6% under the age of 18, 25.4% from 18 to 24, 19.9% from 25 to 44, 17.2% from 45 to 64, and 14.9% who were 65 years of age or older. The median age was 26 years. For every 100 females, there were 80.7 males. For every 100 females age 18 and over, there were 75.7 males.

The median income for a household in the city was $18,889, and the median income for a family was $26,862. Males had a median income of $23,333 versus $22,951 for females. The per capita income for the city was $12,340. About 30.0% of families and 35.7% of the population were below the poverty line, including 44.1% of those under age 18 and 26.3% of those age 65 or over.

== Attractions ==
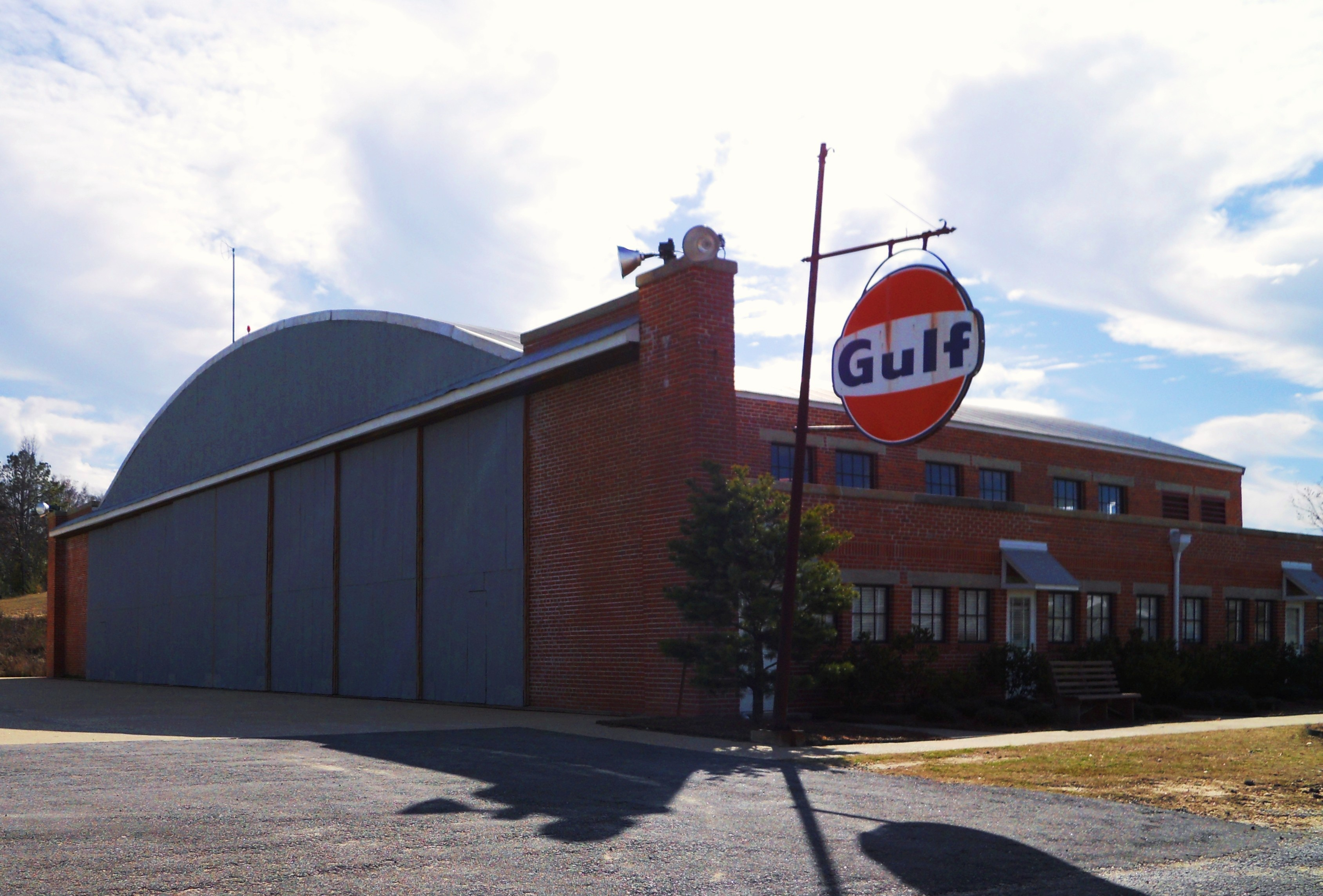
The Hangar One Museum at the Tuskegee Airmen National Historic Site at Moton Field

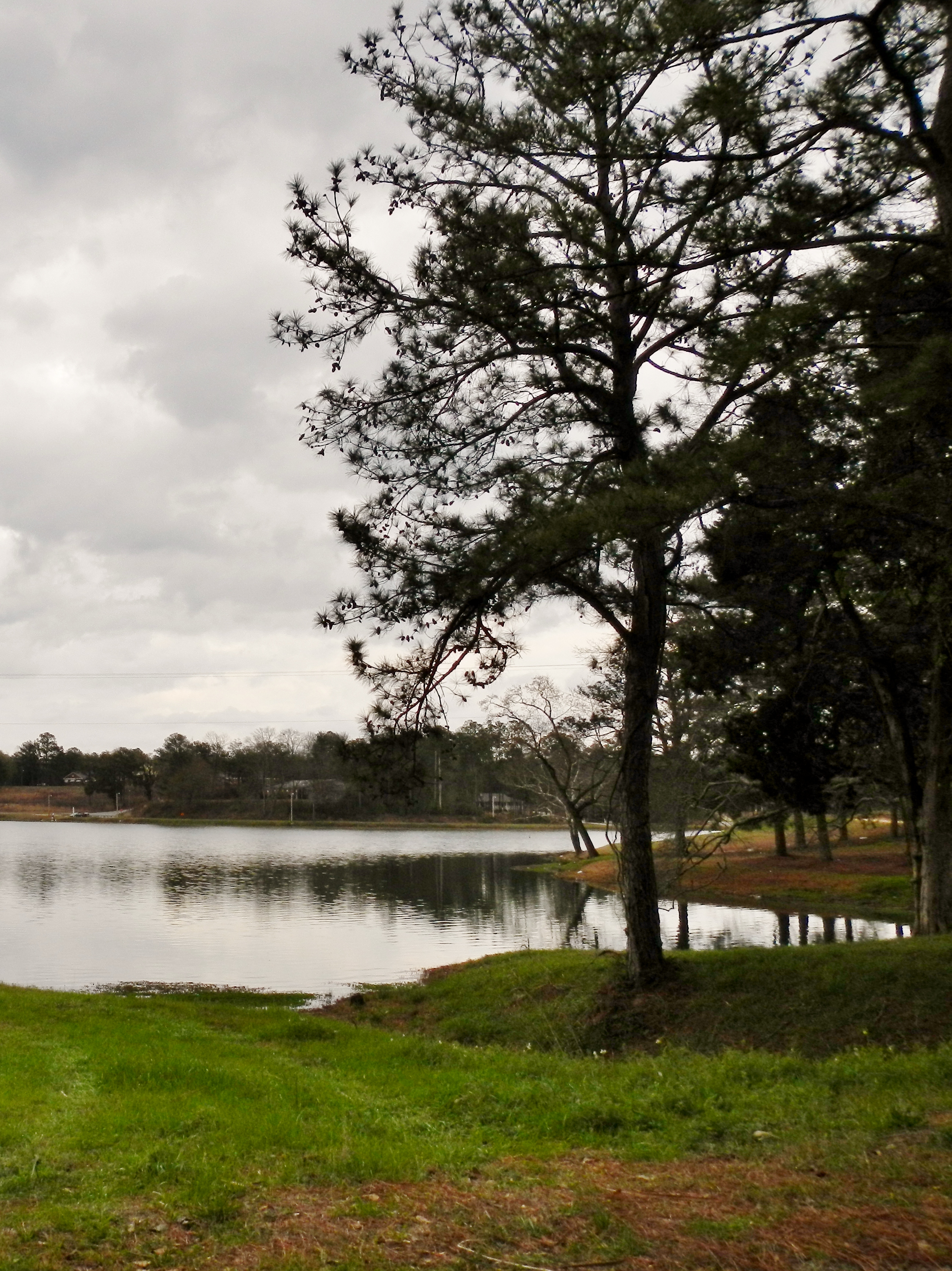
Lake Tuskegee is a city-owned recreational area with playgrounds, picnic areas, and some 92 acres of water providing fishing, sailing, and water skiing opportunities.

Downtown Tuskegee includes historical sites from the time of incorporation to the present. It also has the Tuskegee Visitor Center. Tuskegee area attractions include:

- Tuskegee University and the Tuskegee Institute National Historic Site
- Tuskegee Airmen National Historic Site at Moton Field
- Main Street Historic District and North Main Street Historic District
- Tuskegee Human and Civil Rights Multicultural Center
- Butler Chapel A.M.E. Zion Church, site of protests against 1957 state gerrymandering of the city
- Tuskegee Veterans Administration Medical Center
- Tuskegee Repertory Theatre/Jessie Clinton Arts Center
- Tuskegee City Lake
- Tuskegee National Forest
- Kirks Old Farm Museum

== Government ==
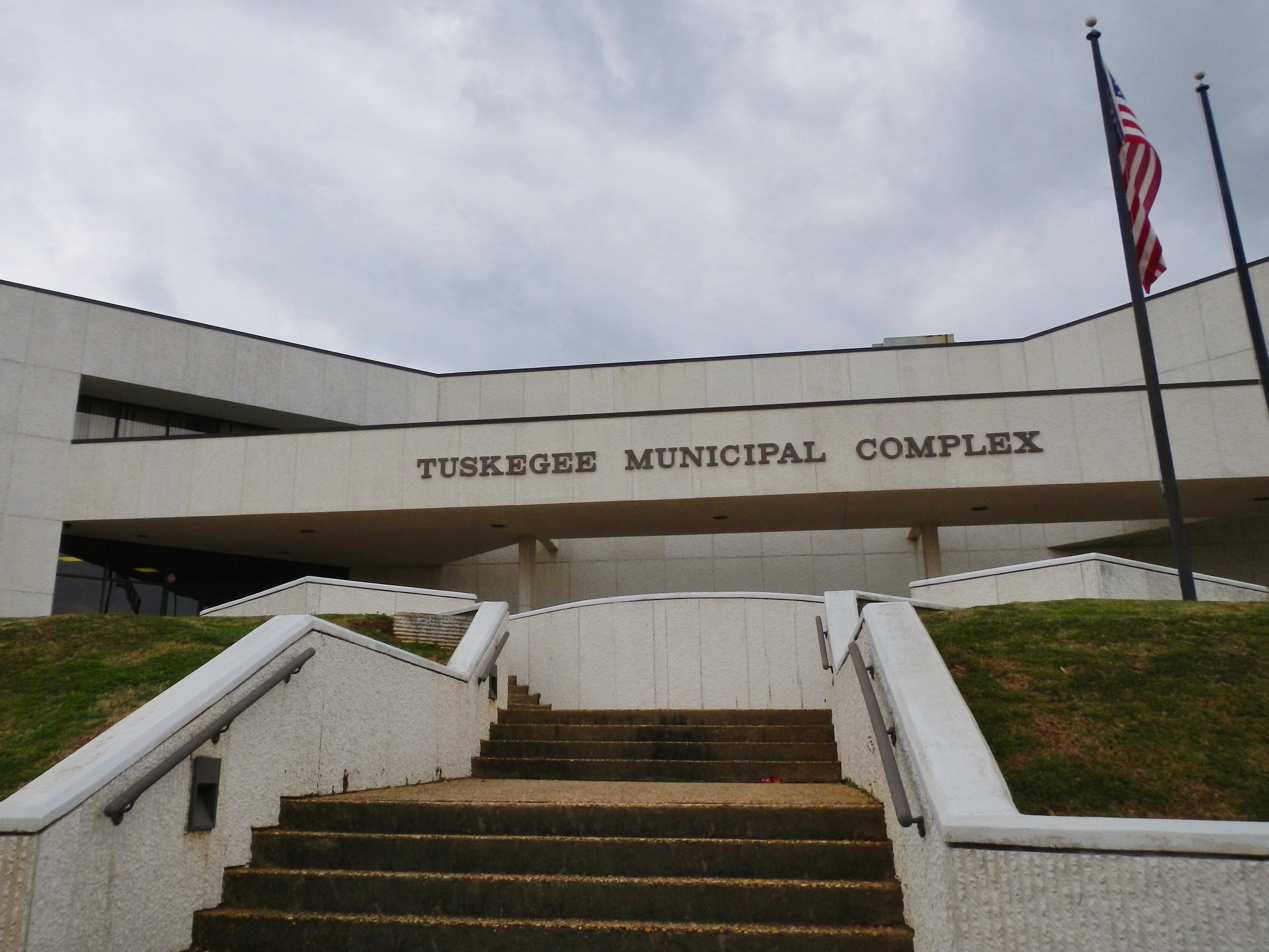
Tuskegee Municipal Complex

In the 21st century, Tuskegee has a council–manager government led by a four-member city council, a mayor, and an appointed city manager.

The city council acts as a legislative body of the city, passing laws and regulations and appointing citizens to the city's various boards. Each member of the city council is elected for a four-year term from one of three geographic single-member districts. Tuskegee has one city council member who is elected at-large to a four-year term and serves as mayor-pro tem. The duties of the mayor are to promote the city, communicate with residents, and preside over City Council meetings. As such, the position of mayor in Tuskegee is primarily ceremonial.

== Media ==
Tuskegee has one weekly newspaper, The Tuskegee News, which has operated since 1865.

== Transportation ==
U.S. Route 29 and U.S. Route 80 pass through Tuskegee. State Route 81 goes north from the town. Four miles north up Route 81 is the interchange with Interstate 85.

A short distance beyond I-85 is the hamlet of Chehaw, where Southern Railway passenger trains made stops at the Western Railway of Alabama Depot. Into the mid-1960s both the Southern's Crescent and its Piedmont Limited made stops at the depot. The railway's Crescent was the last train to make stops at the station. The Southern Railway moved the train out in 1970 for a rerouting from an Atlanta-Montgomery-New Orleans itinerary to an Atlanta-Birmingham-New Orleans itinerary.

== Notable people ==
- Ajiona Alexus, actress; born in Tuskegee
- Alice Beasley (born 1945), textile artist; born in Tuskegee
- George Washington Carver, agricultural scientist, died in Tuskegee in 1943
- David Clopton, former U.S. Congressman, Confederate Congressman, and Speaker of the Alabama House of Representatives
- Sadie Peterson Delaney, chief librarian of the Veterans Administration Hospital
- Wilbur F. Foster (1841–1900) American politician, lawyer, member of the Alabama Legislature
- Tom Joyner, radio host/personality; born in Tuskegee and went to Tuskegee University
- Nella Larsen, nurse, librarian, and novelist; worked at Tuskegee Institute in 1915
- Rosa Parks, born in Tuskegee; she became a civil rights activist in the 1950s in Montgomery, Alabama
- Lionel Richie, rhythm & blues singer, songwriter, musician; born in Tuskegee
- Robin Roberts, news anchor, Good Morning America; born in Tuskegee
- Juel Taylor, Director and screenwriter
- Rory White, basketball player
- Bill Winston, pastor, televangelist, author and entrepreneur; born in Tuskegee
- Sammy Younge Jr., civil rights activist; born in Tuskegee

== Sister cities ==
- South Berwick, Maine, USA

== Gallery ==
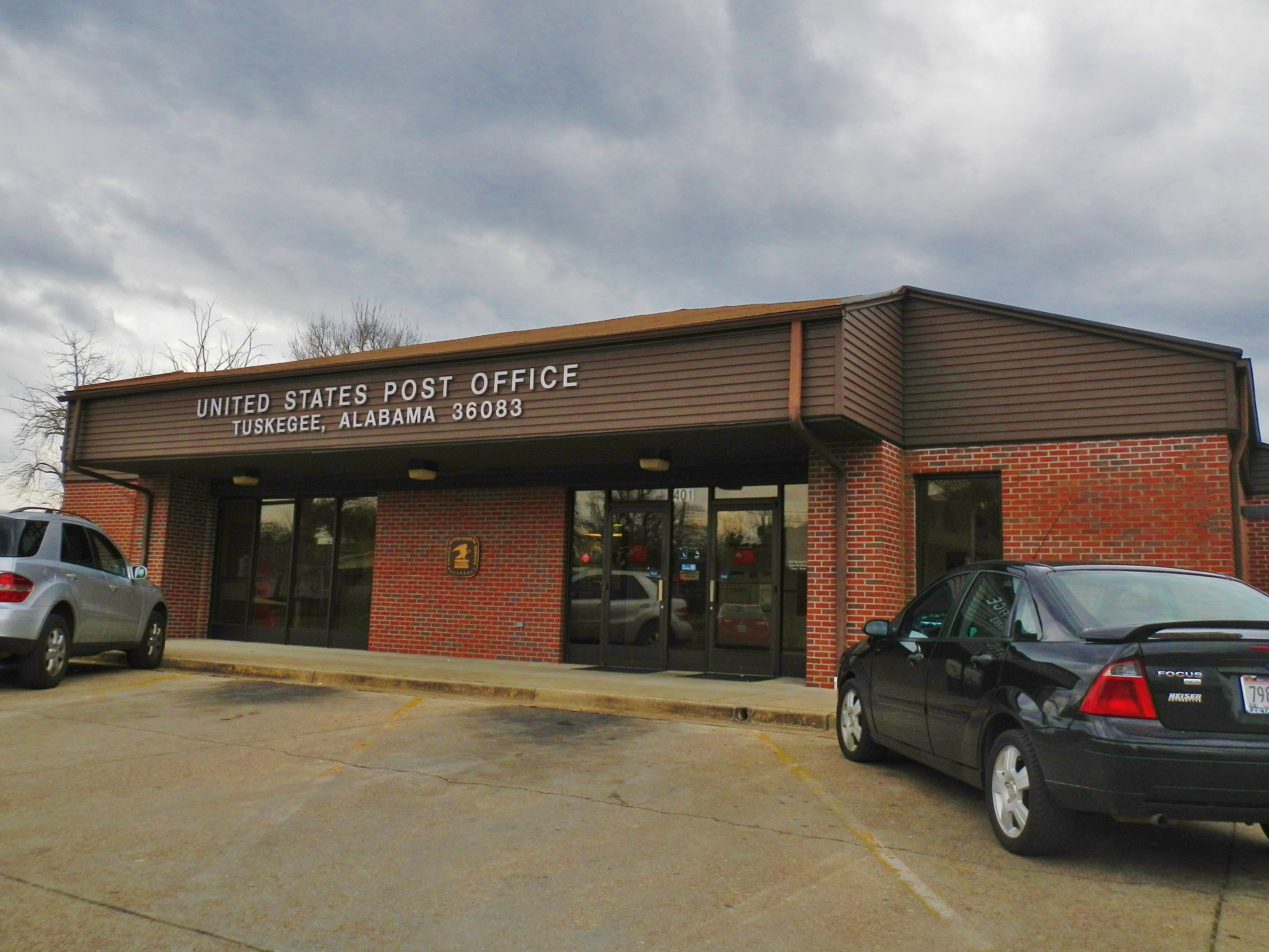
Tuskegee Post Office (ZIP code:36083)

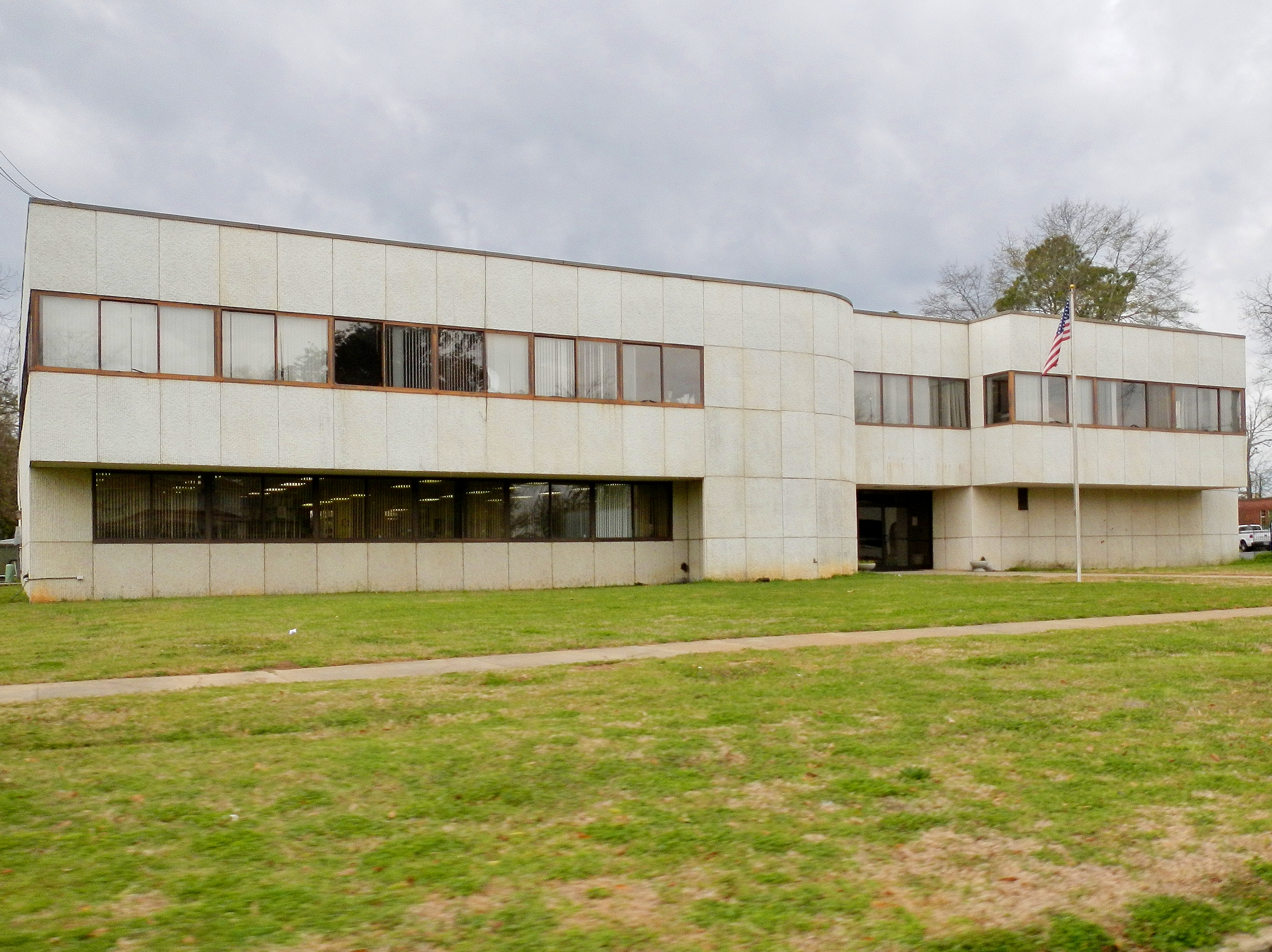
Macon County-Tuskegee Public Library

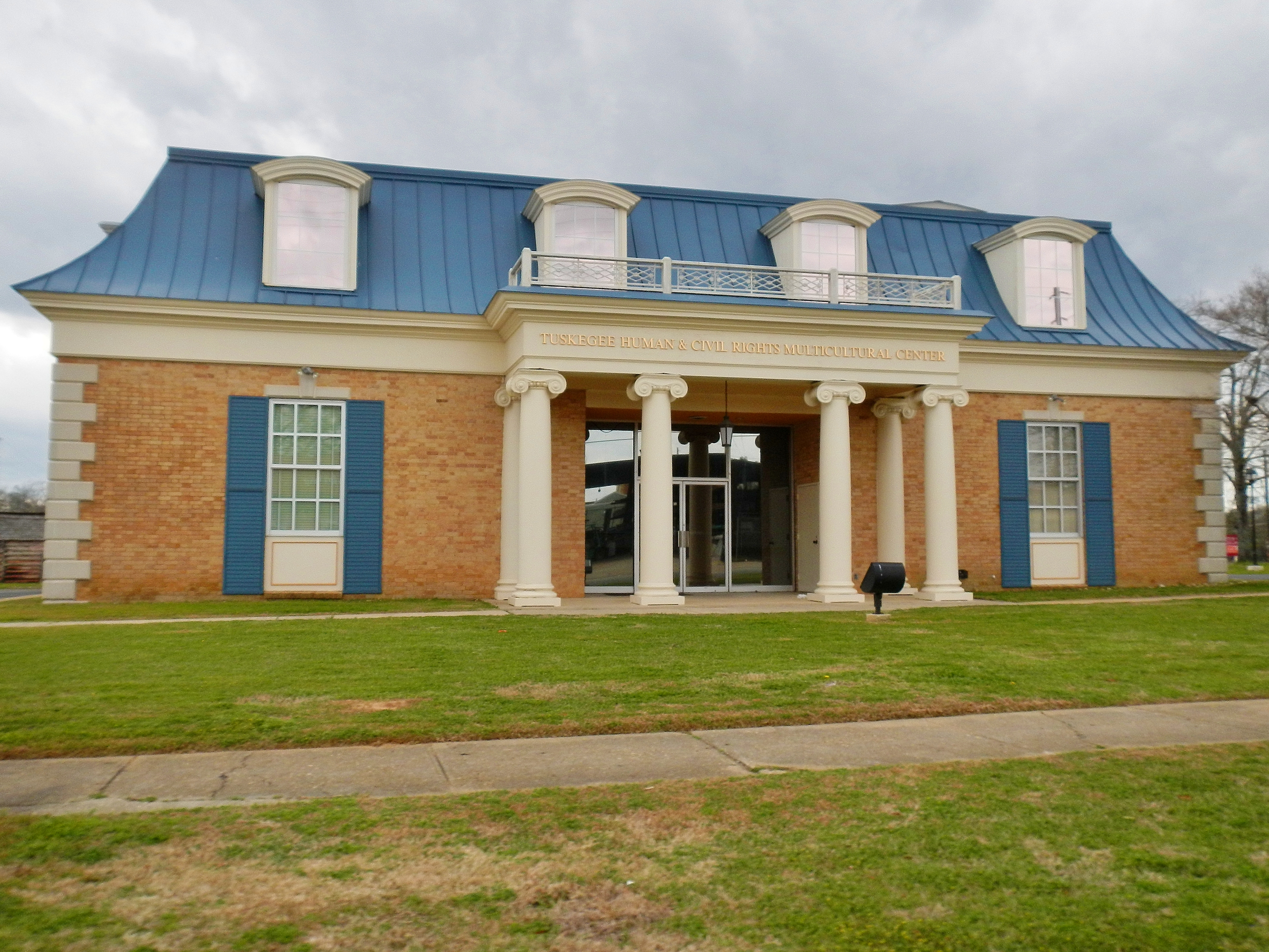
Tuskegee Human & Civil Rights Multicultural Center

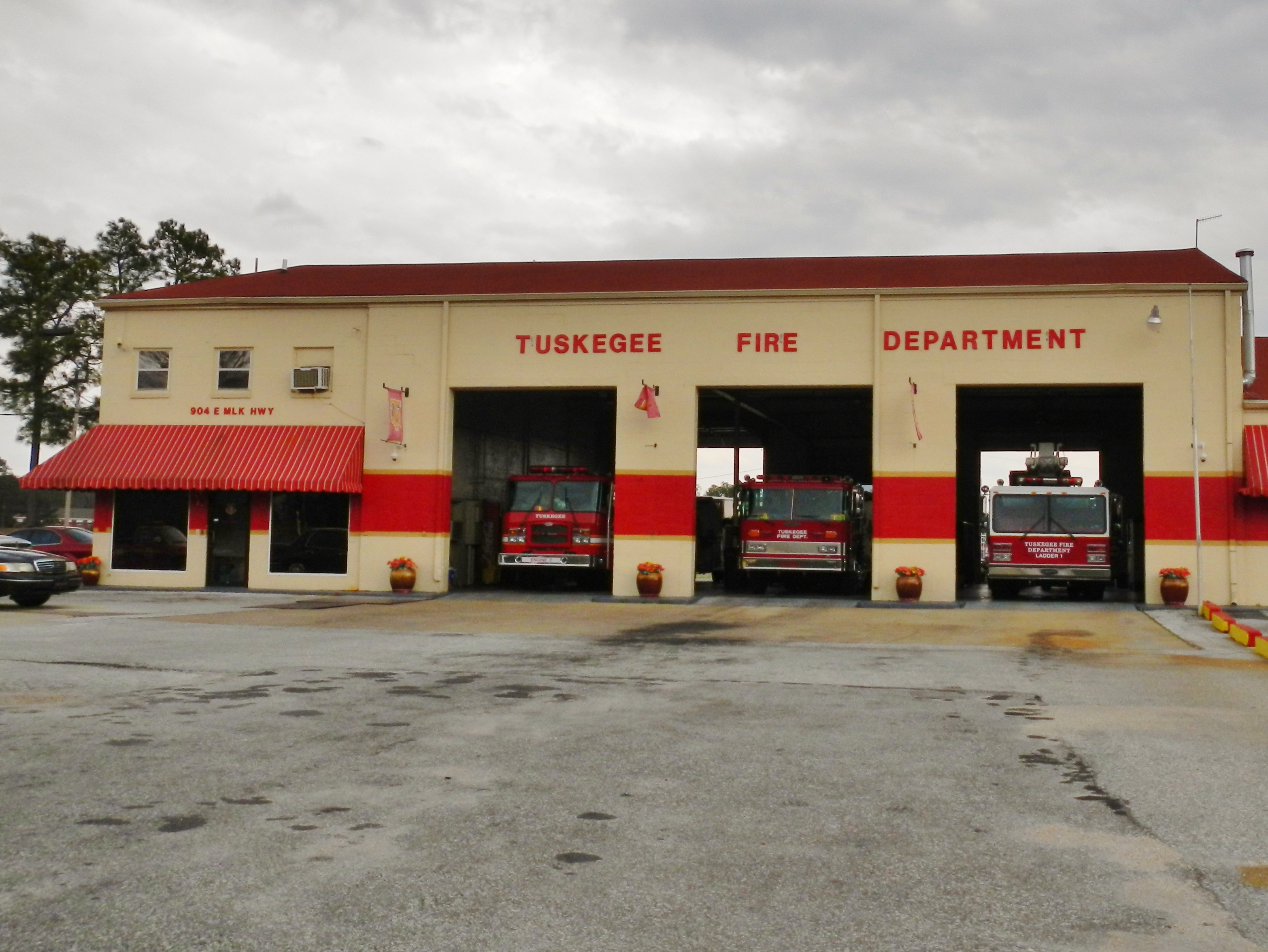
Tuskegee Fire Department

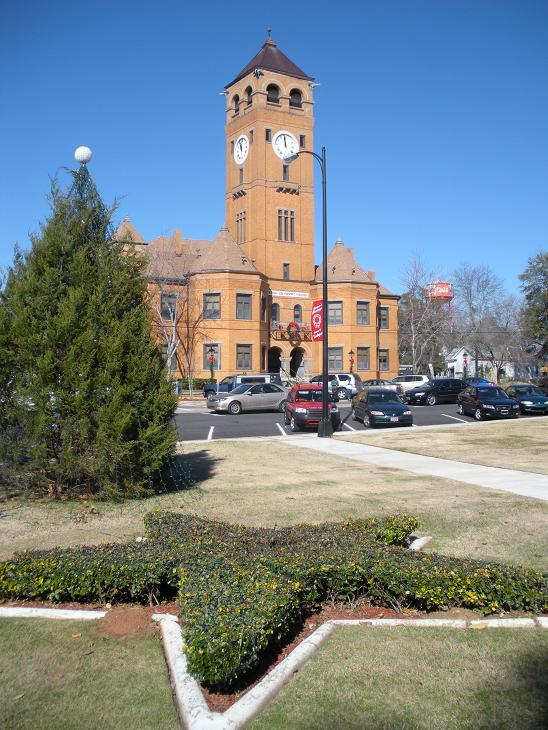
A view of the Macon County Courthouse from the park in the town square The Main Street Historic District was added to the National Register of Historic Places on March 12, 1984.

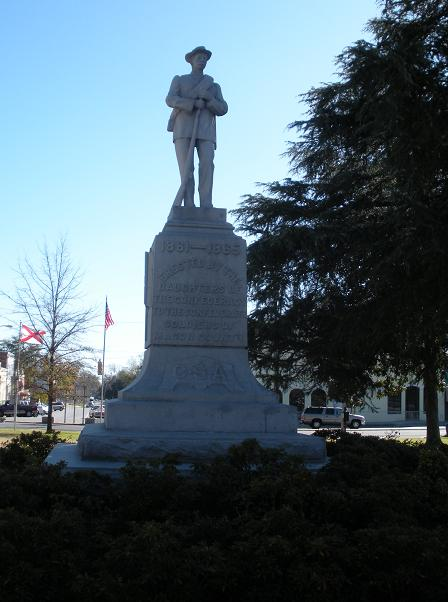
A statue of a Confederate soldier in the town square park is shown. The pedestal reads: "Erected by The Daughters of the Confederacy to the Confederate Soldiers of Macon County".

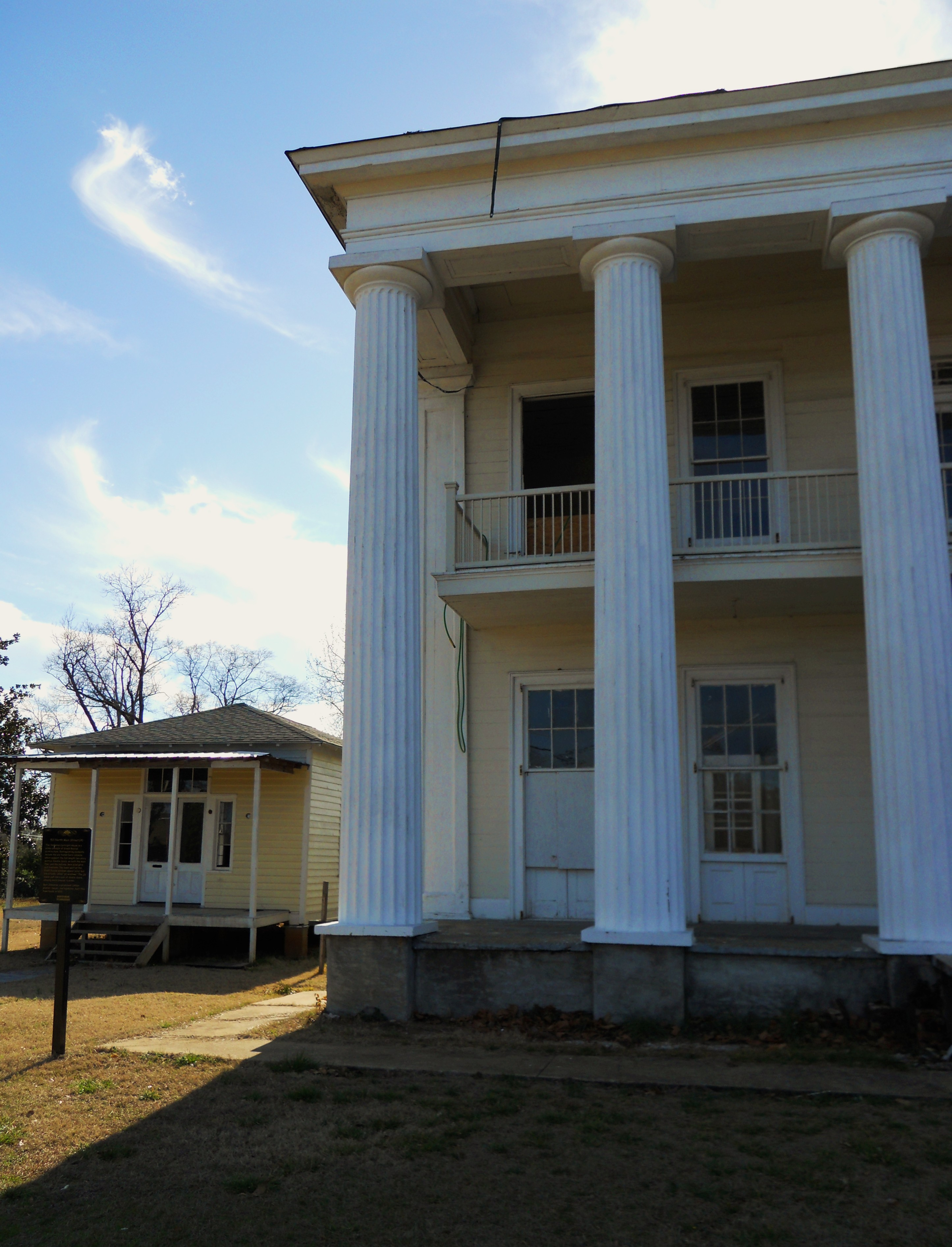
The North Main Street Historic District was added to the National Register of Historic Places on March 7, 1985.

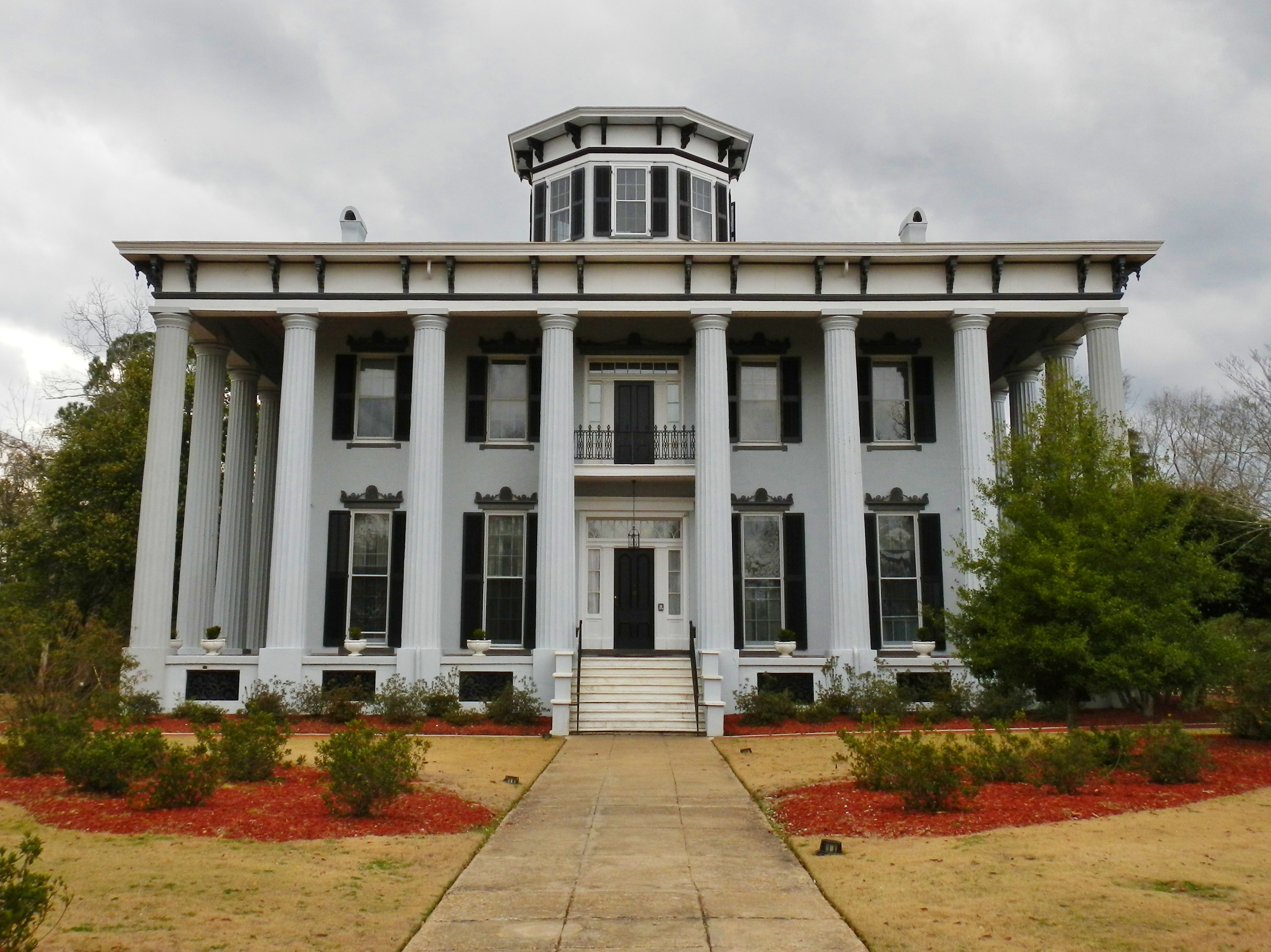
Built in 1857, Grey Columns now serves as the home of the president of Tuskegee University. It was added to the National Register of Historic Places on January 11, 1980.

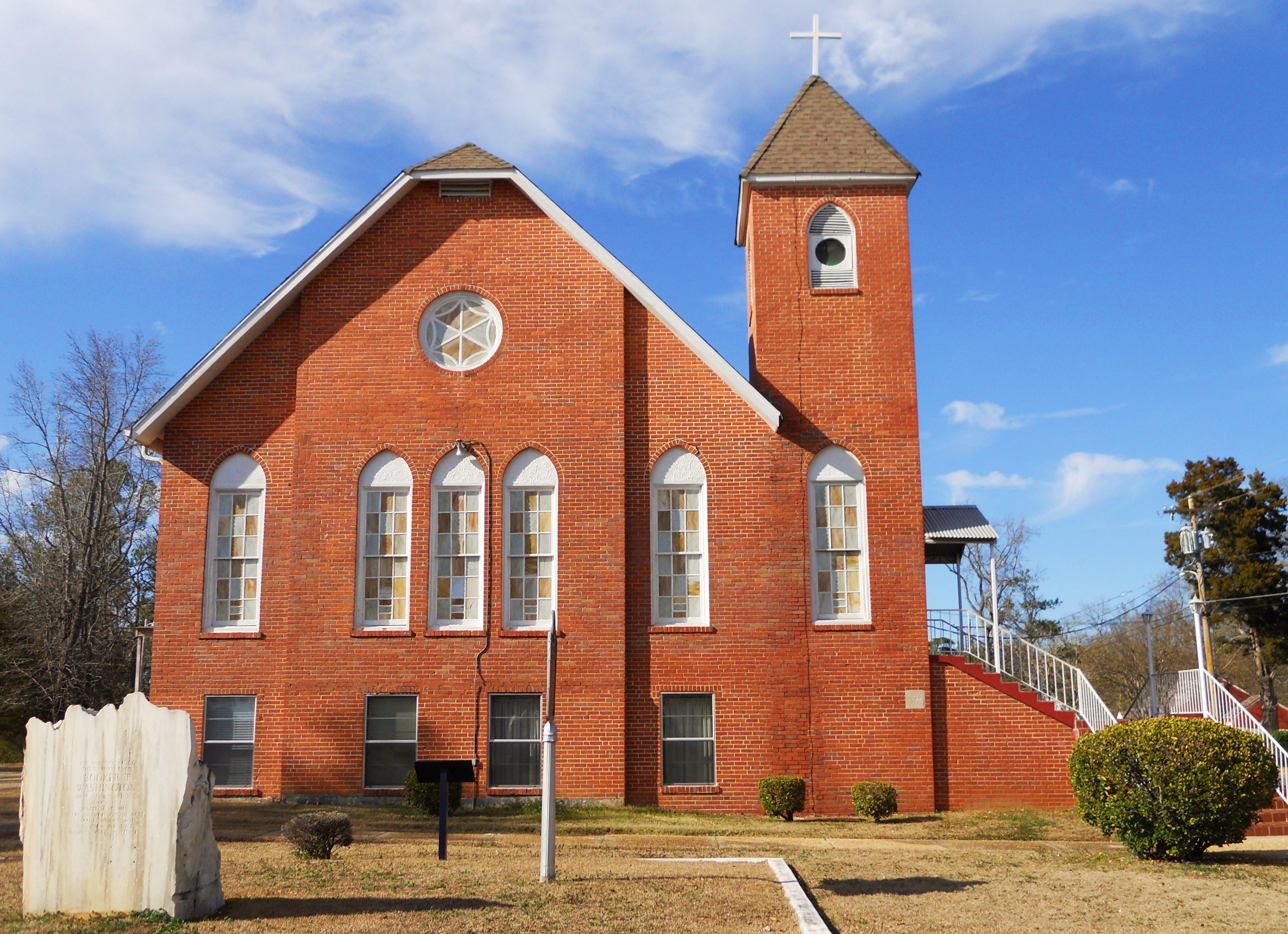
The Butler Chapel African Methodist Episcopal Zion Church was added to the National Register of Historic Places on August 28, 1995.

== See also ==
- List of people from Tuskegee, Alabama
- Civil Rights Movement
- Tuskegee Airmen
- Tuskegee Syphilis Study, an infamous clinical study
