= Jane Bolin =

American judge (1908–2007)

Jane Matilda Bolin
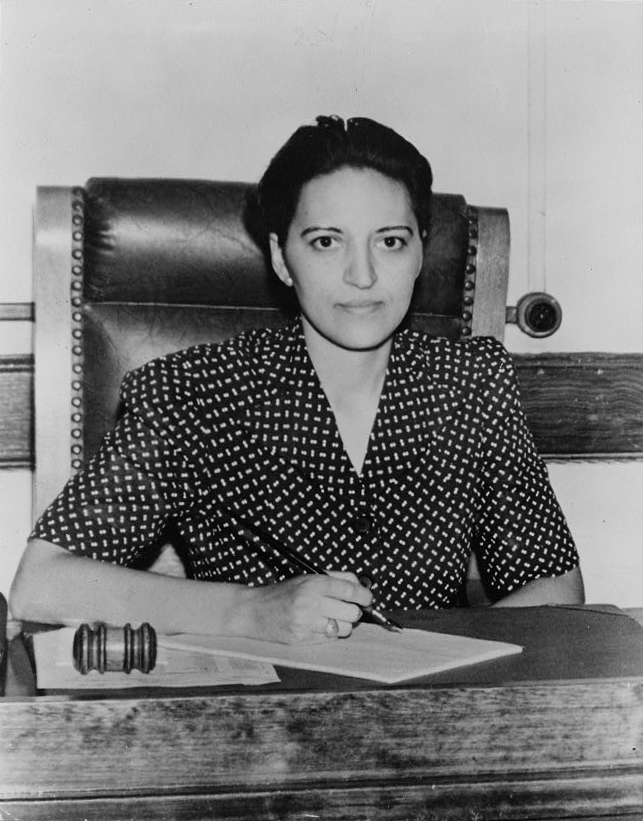
- Bolin in 1942
- Born: April 11, 1908; Poughkeepsie, New York, U.S.
- Died: January 8, 2007 (aged 98); Queens, New York, U.S.
- Education: Wellesley College (AB); Yale University (LLB)
- Occupation: Judge
- Years active: 1939–1979
- Known for: First black female judge in the United States
- Political party: Republican

Jane Matilda Bolin (April 11, 1908 – January 8, 2007) was an American attorney and judge. She was the first black woman to graduate from Yale Law School, the first to join the New York City Bar Association, and the first to join the New York City Law Department. Bolin became the first black woman to serve as a judge in the United States when she was sworn into the bench of the New York City Domestic Relations Court in 1939.

== Early life and education ==
Jane Matilda Bolin was born on April 11, 1908, in Poughkeepsie, New York. She had ten siblings. Her father, Gaius C. Bolin, was a lawyer and the first black person to graduate from Williams College, and her mother, Matilda Ingram Emery, was an immigrant from the British Isles who died when Bolin was 8 years old. Bolin's father practiced law in Dutchess County for fifty years and was the first black president of the Dutchess County Bar Association.

As the child of an interracial couple, Bolin was subject to discrimination in Poughkeepsie; she was occasionally denied service at businesses. Bolin was influenced as a child by articles and pictures of the murders, by extrajudicial hanging, of black southerners in The Crisis, the official magazine of the National Association for the Advancement of Colored People. Bolin grew up as an active member of Smith Metropolitan AME Zion Church.

After attending high school in Poughkeepsie, Bolin was prevented from enrolling at Vassar College because it did not admit black students at the time. At 16, she enrolled at Wellesley College in Massachusetts, where she was one of only two black freshmen. Having been socially rejected by the white students, she and the only other black student decided to live off campus together. She graduated from Wellesley in 1928 in the top 20 of her class. A career adviser at Wellesley College tried to discourage her from applying to Yale Law School due to her race and gender. Nevertheless, in 1931, she became the first black woman to graduate from Yale Law School and passed the New York state bar examination in 1932.

== Career ==
She practiced with her father in Poughkeepsie for a short period before accepting a job with the New York City Corporation Counsel's office. She married attorney Ralph E. Mizelle in 1933, with whom she practiced law in New York City. Mizelle went on to become a member of President Franklin Delano Roosevelt's Black Cabinet before dying in 1943. Bolin subsequently remarried Walter P. Offutt, Jr., a minister who died in 1974. Bolin ran unsuccessfully for the New York State Assembly as a Republican candidate in 1936. Despite the loss, securing the Republican candidacy boosted her reputation in New York politics.

On July 22, 1939, at the New York World's Fair, Mayor of New York City Fiorello La Guardia appointed 31-year-old Bolin as a judge of the Domestic Relations Court. For twenty years, she was the only black female judge in the country. She remained a judge of the court, renamed the Family Court in 1962, for 40 years, with her appointment being renewed three times, until she was required to retire aged 70. She worked to encourage racially integrated child services, ensuring that probation officers were assigned without regard to race or religion, and publicly funded childcare agencies accepted children without regard to ethnic background.

Bolin was an activist for children's rights and education. She was a legal advisor to the National Council of Negro Women. She served on the boards of the NAACP, the National Urban League, the City-Wide Citizens' Committee on Harlem, and the Child Welfare League. Though she resigned from the NAACP due to its response to McCarthyism, she remained active in the Civil Rights Movement. Bolin also sought to combat racial discrimination from religious groups by helping to open a special school for black boys in New York City. She received honorary degrees from Tuskegee Institute, Williams College, Hampton University, Western College for Women and Morgan State University.

=== Electoral history ===
1936 New York State Assembly election, 19th district
Party	Candidate	Votes	%
Democratic	Robert W. Justice (incumbent)	18,557	77.63
Republican	Jane Bolin	4,572	19.13
Communist	Horace Gordon	504	2.11
Socialist	Victor Gaspar	271	1.13
Total votes		23,904	100.00
Democratic hold			

== Legacy ==
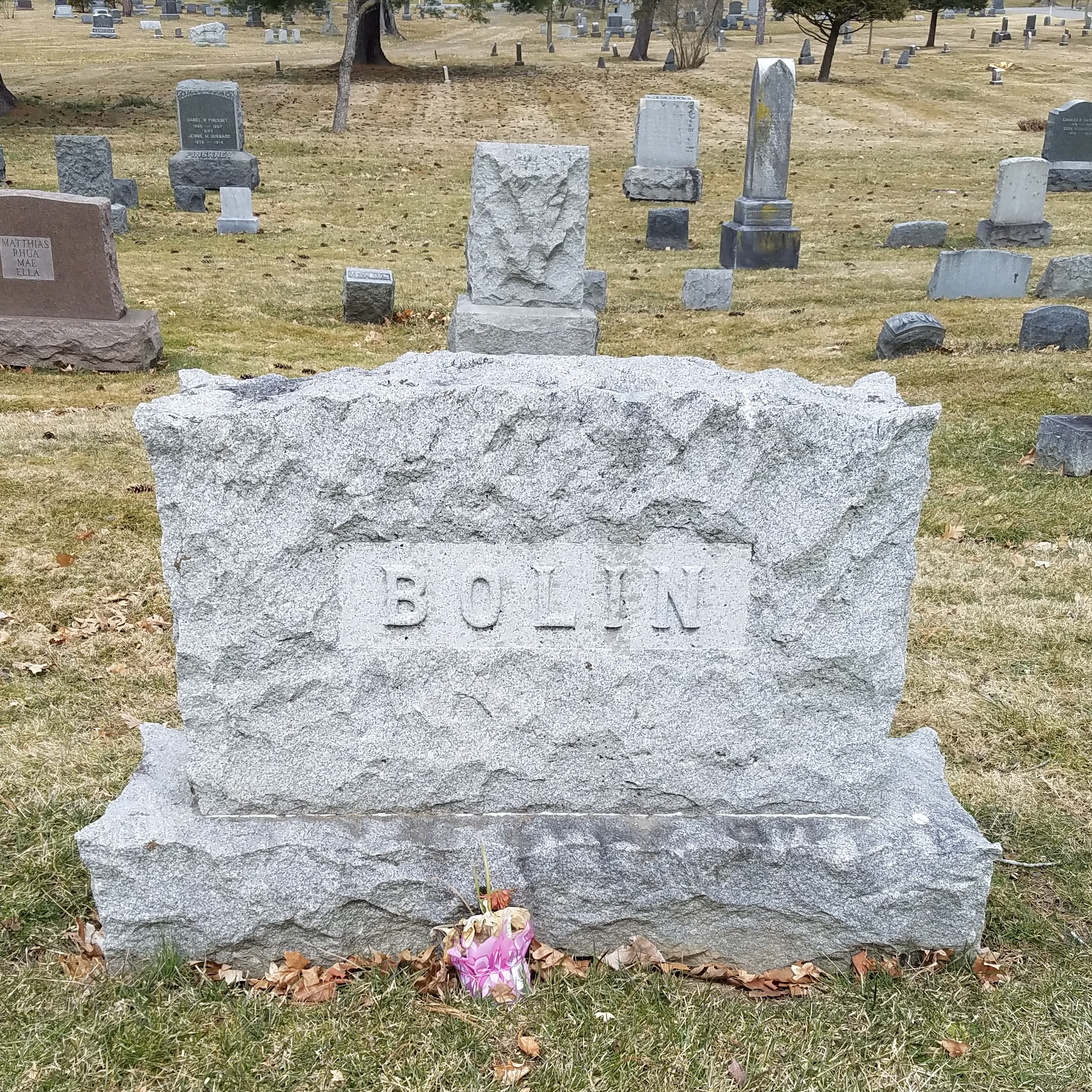
The Bolin family plot at Poughkeepsie Rural Cemetery

After she retired in 1979, Bolin volunteered as a reading instructor in New York City public schools for two years and served on the New York State Board of Regents, reviewing disciplinary cases. After a life of groundbreaking achievements, Jane Bolin died on Monday, January 8, 2007, at the age of 98 in Long Island City, Queens, New York.

Bolin and her father feature prominently in a mural at the Dutchess County Court House in Poughkeepsie and the Poughkeepsie City School District's administration building is named for her. During her lifetime, judges including Judith Kaye and Constance Baker Motley cited Bolin as a source of inspiration for their careers. Upon her death, Charles Rangel spoke in tribute to Bolin on the floor of the U.S. House of Representatives. In 2017, Jeffrion L. Aubry introduced a bill in the New York State Assembly to rename the Queens–Midtown Tunnel the Jane Bolin Tunnel. Bolin is interred at Poughkeepsie Rural Cemetery.

== See also ==
- Macon Bolling Allen, believed to be both the first black man licensed to practice law and to hold a judicial position in the United States
- Ketanji Brown Jackson, the first black woman Associate Justice of the U.S. Supreme Court
- Thurgood Marshall, the first black Associate Justice of the U.S. Supreme Court
- Charlotte E. Ray, the first black woman lawyer in the United States
- List of African-American jurists
- List of first women lawyers and judges in New York
- List of first women lawyers and judges in the United States
