= Sadie Peterson Delaney =

American librarian (1889–1958)

- Born: February 26, 1889; Rochester, New York
- Died: May 4, 1958 (aged 69); Tuskegee, Alabama
- Occupation: Librarian

Sadie Peterson Delaney (February 26, 1889 – May 4, 1958) was the chief librarian of the Veterans Administration Hospital in Tuskegee, Alabama, for 34 years. She is well known as a pioneer for her work with bibliotherapy.

== Biography ==
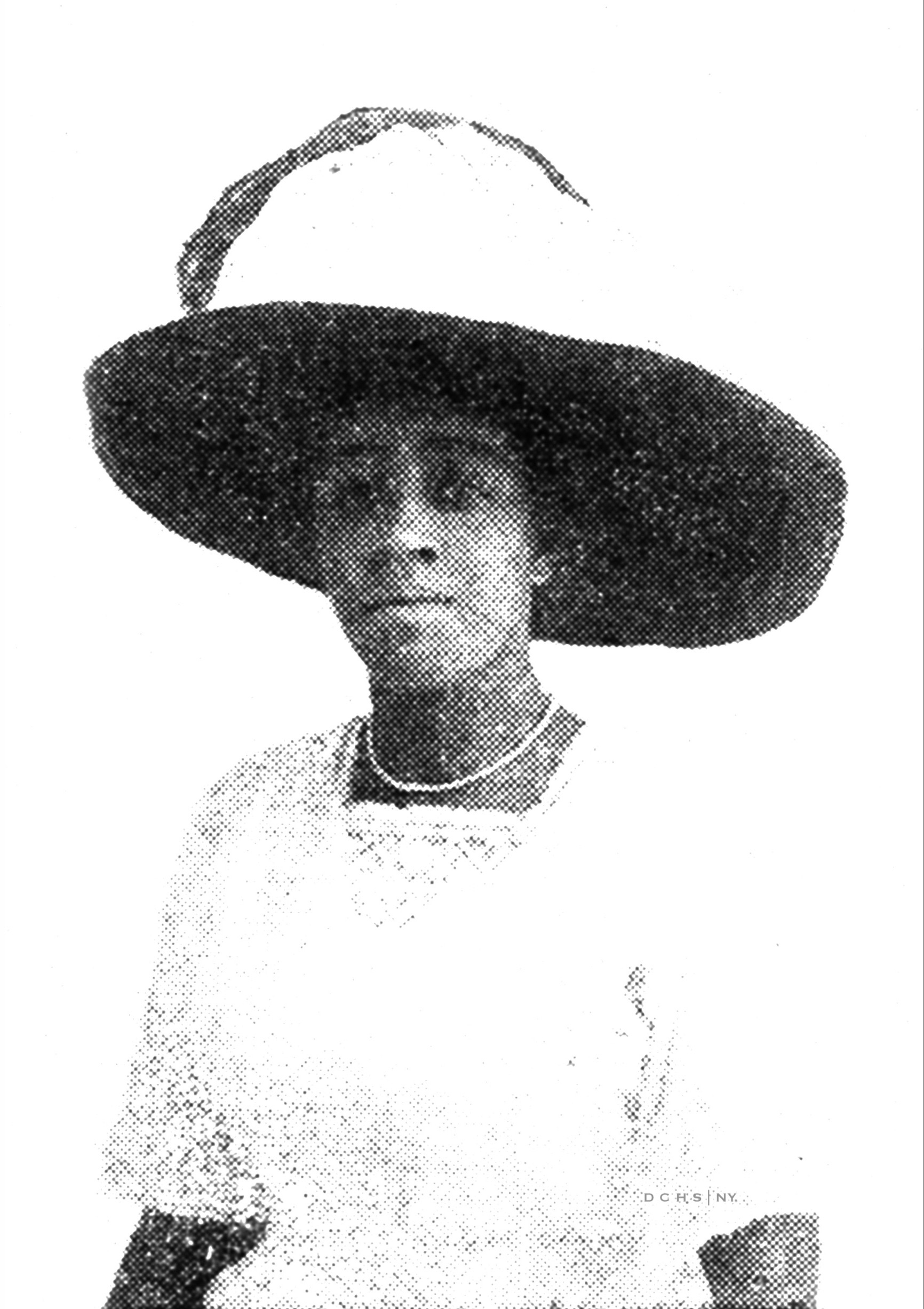
Sadie M. Peterson in a 1915 photo from The Quill, the Parish newsletter of the Smith Metropolitan AME Zion Church in Poughkeepsie, NY.

Sadie Peterson Delaney, daughter of Julia Frances Hawkins Johnson and James Johnson, was born on February 26, 1889, in Rochester, New York. She attended high school in Poughkeepsie, New York, and also spent one year at Miss McGovern's School of Social Work. She was active in the Smith Metropolitan AME Zion Church where she was recognized for her poetry and activities that ranged from being a Sabbath School teacher, to being a member of the sewing circle, to being President of the J. W. Hood Literary Society.

She attended college at the College of the City of New York, graduating in 1919. She went on to receive her library training at the New York Public Library School from 1920 to 1921. Delaney had one daughter named Grace with her first husband, Edward Louis Peterson. They divorced in 1924, and she married Rudicel A. Delaney in 1928. Delaney had a heart attack and died in Tuskegee, Alabama, on May 4, 1958.

== Career ==
=== New York Public Library ===
Delaney continued her work at the New York Public Library after she completed her training. She worked at the 135th Street Branch in Harlem through 1923. She worked diligently to increase the programs available for children of different ethnic backgrounds. She ran story hours, discussion groups, and other events for children. Some of the events were geared specifically toward juvenile delinquents, foreign-born children or blind children. Her interest in working with blind children led her to learn Braille and Moon Code, a system of reading and writing for blind people. She also worked with parents and community elders, helping them to see the value of the library for the children that they worked with at home or in community groups.

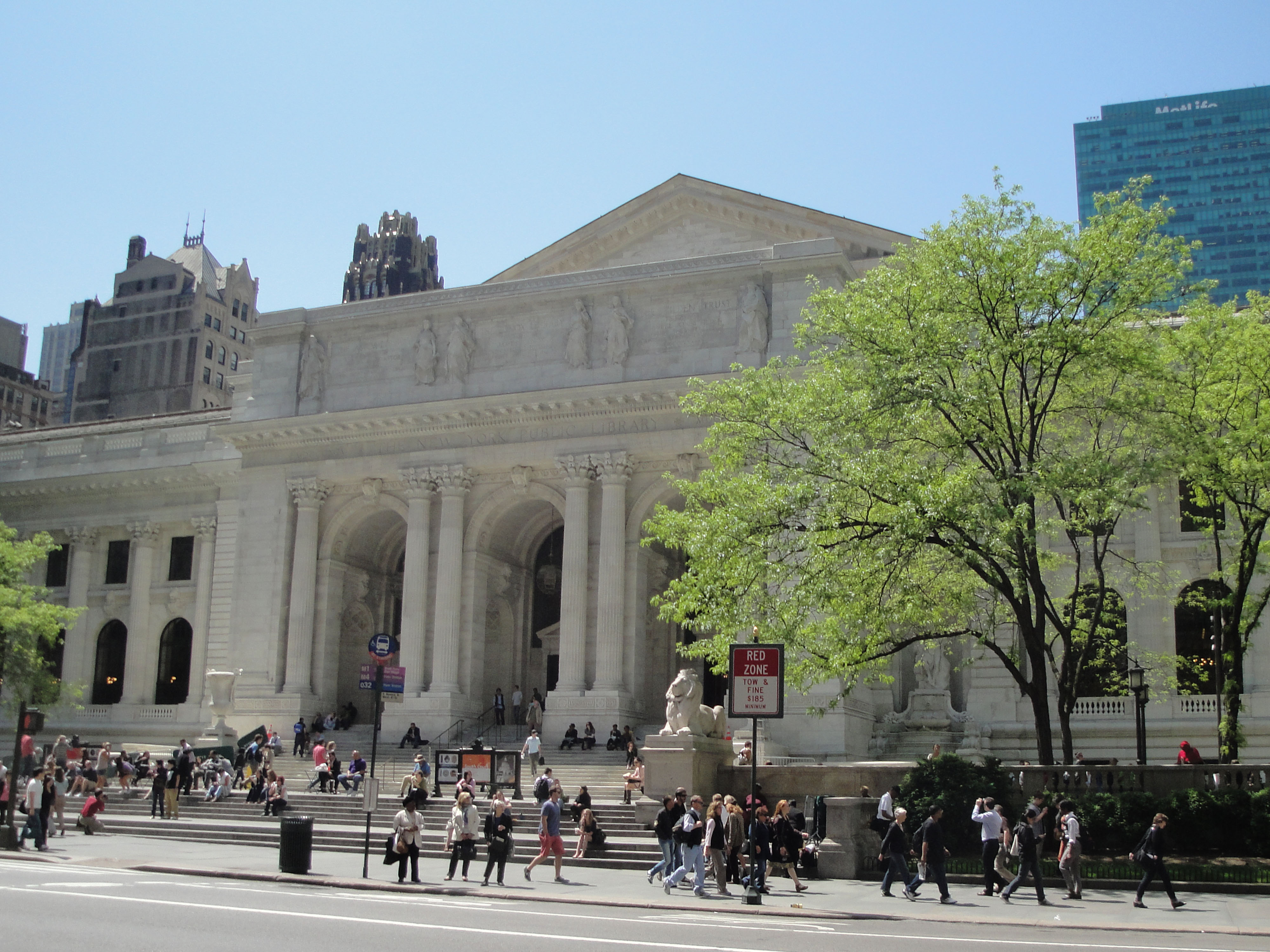
The New York Public Library: where Delaney started her library career

While at the New York Public Library, Delaney was integral in the development of an African American collection. She routinely met with African American authors, helping them to connect with other authors and publishers. Delaney often helped arrange artistic programs that included talks by scholars and community leaders such as W.E.B. Du Bois, James Weldon Johnson, William H. Ferris, George Edmund Haynes, Hubert Harrison, and Fred Moore. She also established the first African American exhibit of art held in the New York Public Library.

=== Veterans Administration Hospital ===
Delaney was approached to head the library at the Veterans Administration Hospital in Tuskegee, Alabama. The hospital was home to physically disabled African American war veterans and veterans with mental or emotional issues. Delaney initially took a six-month leave of absence from the New York Public Library; however, she ended up staying in Tuskegee for the remainder of her career. When she arrived at the Veterans Administration Hospital in January 1924, there were just 200 books and a table in the library.

One of the first things Delaney did in Tuskegee was make the library more welcoming. She moved it into a larger room and added plants, wall hangings, flowers and other inviting elements. She wanted to have a positive impact on the patients in the hospital. She also began acquiring books for both the patients and the medical staff.

Within one year of Delaney's arrival in Tuskegee, the library had 4,000 volumes available for patients and 85 volumes available in the medical library. Library circulation had risen to 1,000 books per month. By 1954, there were over 13,000 volumes in the patient library and over 3,000 volumes in the medical library. In addition to the chief librarian, there were six library assistants to help handle the demand for library resources. Delaney died in 1958 after working 34 years at the hospital.

== Bibliotherapy ==
Delaney used bibliotherapy extensively in her work. She defined bibliotherapy as, “the treatment of patients through selected reading.” She was an advocate of giving the patients individual attention in order to learn their interests. She could use this knowledge to help pair them with books that would engage them. To help choose appropriate books for patients, Delaney would consult with the doctors and medical staff. She spoke of the value of having a librarian at medical meetings regarding patients. She also reviewed books, especially those that were written by or depicted African Americans. When choosing books for the library collection, Delaney took patient interests into consideration. She also tried to maintain information on current events and reference materials.

To complement her work with books and bibliotherapy, Delaney developed many special programs for the patients. She instituted book talks, monthly program meetings, a story hour and a variety of other clubs. She could share her own interests in some of the groups, such as the stamp and coin collecting clubs. She tried diligently to get all of the veterans involved with clubs and library activities. She ran a book cart program so that patients confined to their beds still had access to reading material. For those unable to hold a book, Delaney arranged for the books to be projected on the wall. The patient could turn the pages with a single button. She also sang familiar songs and read poetry to help the patients feel more relaxed.

She continued her work with the blind by teaching Braille at the hospital. As blind patients learned how to read Braille, some of them taught others. Delaney acquired talking books for the blind patients. Delaney taught more than 600 patients how to read Braille. They were also encouraged to join the clubs and programs that were run, giving them the same opportunities as the other patients.

In 1927, Delaney and the patients began broadcasting the library activities on the local radio station. The patients participated in book and art fairs, displaying their work and delivering talks about books. They were given numerous opportunities and choices for a creative outlet with the various activities available. Delaney also started the Disabled Veterans’ Literary Society, which received acclaim from the Veterans Administration. In the February 1938 Opportunity magazine, which Delaney occasionally wrote for, she explains her work with the patients in the hospital, “Here minds long imprisoned by lethargy are awakened…And once again he is alive with enthusiasm and joy derived from activity.”

== Professional associations ==
Delaney was active in many professional associations. She served on the advisory board for the National Association for the Advancement of Colored People (NAACP) for five years. She was a member of the International Library Association and the American Library Association (ALA), where she served on the Council from 1946 to 1951. Delaney was elected councilor of the ALA Hospital Library Division in 1947. She was also a member of the Library of Congress Committee for Work with the Blind.

Delaney worked to join the Alabama Library Association, which did not allow African Americans into its membership at that time. She was eventually invited to join by the president of the Alabama Library Association; however, on April 15, 1951, when the next president took over, her dues were returned and her membership was discontinued. The Association suggested that she start an African American chapter, and Delaney balked at that idea. She cited examples of other professional organizations that had integrated, including library associations in other southern states. Delaney tried again to join the Alabama Library Association two years later, and was met with rejection again.

== Awards and honors ==
Students from University of Illinois, University of North Carolina and Atlanta University were sent to observe and learn from Delaney at the Veterans Administration Hospital. Librarians from Europe, South Africa and around the United States also came to observe Delaney and her use of bibliotherapy. Her library was used as a model for other Veterans Administration hospitals. She was invited to give speeches at American universities, community churches and a conference in Rome in 1934.

In 1948, she was named Woman of the Year by the Iota Phi Lambda sorority. She received the same honor again in 1949 by the Zeta Phi Beta sorority, and then in 1950 by the National Urban League. Also in 1950, an honorary doctorate was bestowed upon her by Atlanta University. She was honored with a testimonial banquet at the 1950 American Library Association convention, and the US Veterans Administration awarded her their top award for excellence in 1956.

== Legacy ==
- After Delaney's death in 1958, the Atlanta University School of Library Science started a scholarship in her name.
- Delaney was inducted into the Alabama Library Association's Hall of Fame in 1982.
- Named in her honor, The Sadie Peterson Delaney African Roots Library opened in Poughkeepsie, New York.
- The Sadie Peterson Delaney African Roots Branch Library reopened on April 9, 2022 as a fully circulating library of the Poughkeepsie Public Library District in the Mid-Hudson Library System to honor Delaney's legacy of literacy.
- The New York Public Library has acquired and archived a large quantity of Delaney's personal letters.
- Delaney was recognized as one of the 100 most important leaders of the 20th century by American Libraries.
- In 2015, a non-profit organization by the name of Words Heal, Inc. was also named the Sadie Peterson Delaney Literary Collaborative, in her honor. The organization promotes bibliotherapy as a complement to conventional therapies and treatments for mental wellness.

== Authored Articles ==
Peterson SM. The Library; A Factor in Negro Education. The Messenger 1923 July;5 (7): 772-773.

Peterson SM. U.S.V. Hospital Library No.91, Tuskegee, Ala. Crisis a Record of the Darker Races 1925 Jan;29 (3): 116-117.

Delaney SP. The Library—A Factor in Veterans' Bureau Hospitals. Medical Bulletin 1930 Apr;6 (4): 331-334.

Delaney SP. The Negro Veteran and His Books. Wilson Bulletin for Librarians 1932 Jun;6 (10): 684-686.

Delaney SP. Bibliotherapy as an Aid to Rehabilitation. Journal National Association College Women 1935; (12): 9-11.

Delaney SP. The Place of Bibliotherapy in a Hospital. Opportunity Journal of Negro Life 1938 Feb;16 (2): 53-56.

Delaney SP. Place of Bibliotherapy in a Hospital. Library Journal 1938 April;63: 305-308. (Reprinted from Opportunity Journal of Negro Life)

Delaney SP. Library Activities at Tuskegee. Medical Bulletin of the Veterans' Administration 1940 Oct;17 (2): 163-169.

Delaney SP. Bibliography on Bibliotherapy. Bulletin of Bibliography 1951 Sep-Dec:135.

Delaney SP. Time's Telling. Wilson Library Bulletin 1955 Feb;29 (6): 461-463.

Delaney SP. Bibliotherapy for patients in Antabuse clinic. Hospital Book Guide 1955 Oct;16 (8); 141-143.

== Featured Articles ==
American Hospital Librarian Honoured. Book Trolley (England) 1950 Summer; 6:38-39.

Bauer HC. Seasoned to Taste. Wilson Library Bulletin 1955 Feb; 29 (6): 404.

Brown EF. Origins and Pioneers. In: Bibliotherapy and its Widening Applications. Metuchen: Sage 1975: 13-38.

Cantrell CH. Sadie P. Delaney: Bibliotherapist and Librarian. Southeastern Librarian 1956 Fall; 6(3): 1105-109. (Reprinted, Congressional Record, Appendix 1957 Jan 17: A266-A267.)

Dibble Eh. The Veterans' Administration Facility for Negro Beneficiaries, Tuskegee, Ala. Medical Bulletin of the Veterans' Administration 1940 Oct;17(2): 158-162.

Favazza Ar. Bibliotherapy: A Critique of the Literature. Bulletin of the Medical Library Association 1966 Apr;54(2): 138-141.

Gubert BK. Sadie Peterson Delaney: Pioneer Bibliotherapist. American Libraries 1993 Feb:12(2): 124-130.

Hospital Libraries: Veterans Administration Hospital, Tuskegee, Alabama. Book Trolley (England) 1938 April;17(1): 346-347.

Jones, VL. Delaney, Sadie Peterson (1889-1959) In: Dictionary of American Library Biography. Littleton, Colorado: Libraries Unlimited, 1978:122-124.

McDougald EJ. The Task of Negro Womanhood. In: Locke A, ed. The New Negro. New York: Johnson Reprint Corporation, 1968: 369-384.

Oppenheim G. Bibliotherapy—A new work for your vocabulary. (Bloemfontein, South Africa) Cape Times 1938 Jan 15:3.

Pomeroy E. U.S. Veterans' Hospital Library Service. Library Journal 1975 Mar;50(6): 253-256.

Schneck JM A Bibliography on Bibliotherapy and Libraries in Mental Hospitals. Bulletin of the Menninger Clinic 1945 Sept;9 (5): 170-174.

Sprague MD. Dr. Sadie Peterson Delaney "Great Humanitarian." Service 1951 June;15(11): 17-18, 25-26.

Roosevelt, E. My Day. New York Post 1957 Jan 18:3.

== The Tuskegee Controversy ==
Daniel P. Black Power in the 1920's: The Case of Tuskegee Veterans Hospital. Journal of Southern History 1970; 36(3): 368-388.

Marable M. Tuskegee and the Politics of Illusion in the New South. Black Scholar 1977; 8(7): 13-24.

Marable M. Tuskegee Institute in the 1920's. Negro History Bulletin 1977; 40(6): 764-768.

Matthews, CS. The Decline of the Tuskegee Machine, 1915-1925: the Abdication of Political Power South Atlantic Quarterly 1976; 74(4): 460-469.

Norrell, RJ, Perfect Quiet, Peace and Harmony: Another Look at the Founding of Tuskegee Institute. Alabama Review 1983.; 36(2): 110-128

Powell RH How the U.S. Government Broke Faith with the Blacks and Whites of Tuskegee. Birmingham Daily News, July [?], 1923. Clipping in National Association for the Advancement of Colored People Records (Manuscript Division, Library of Congress, Washington, D.C.).

Walton LA. Southern Opinion on the Tuskegee Hospital. Outlook 1923 Sept 5;85:14-16.
