= Butler Chapel A.M.E. Zion Church (Tuskegee, Alabama) =

Historic church in Alabama, United States

- Butler Chapel African Methodist Episcopal Zion Church
- U.S. National Register of Historic Places
- Alabama Register of Landmarks and Heritage
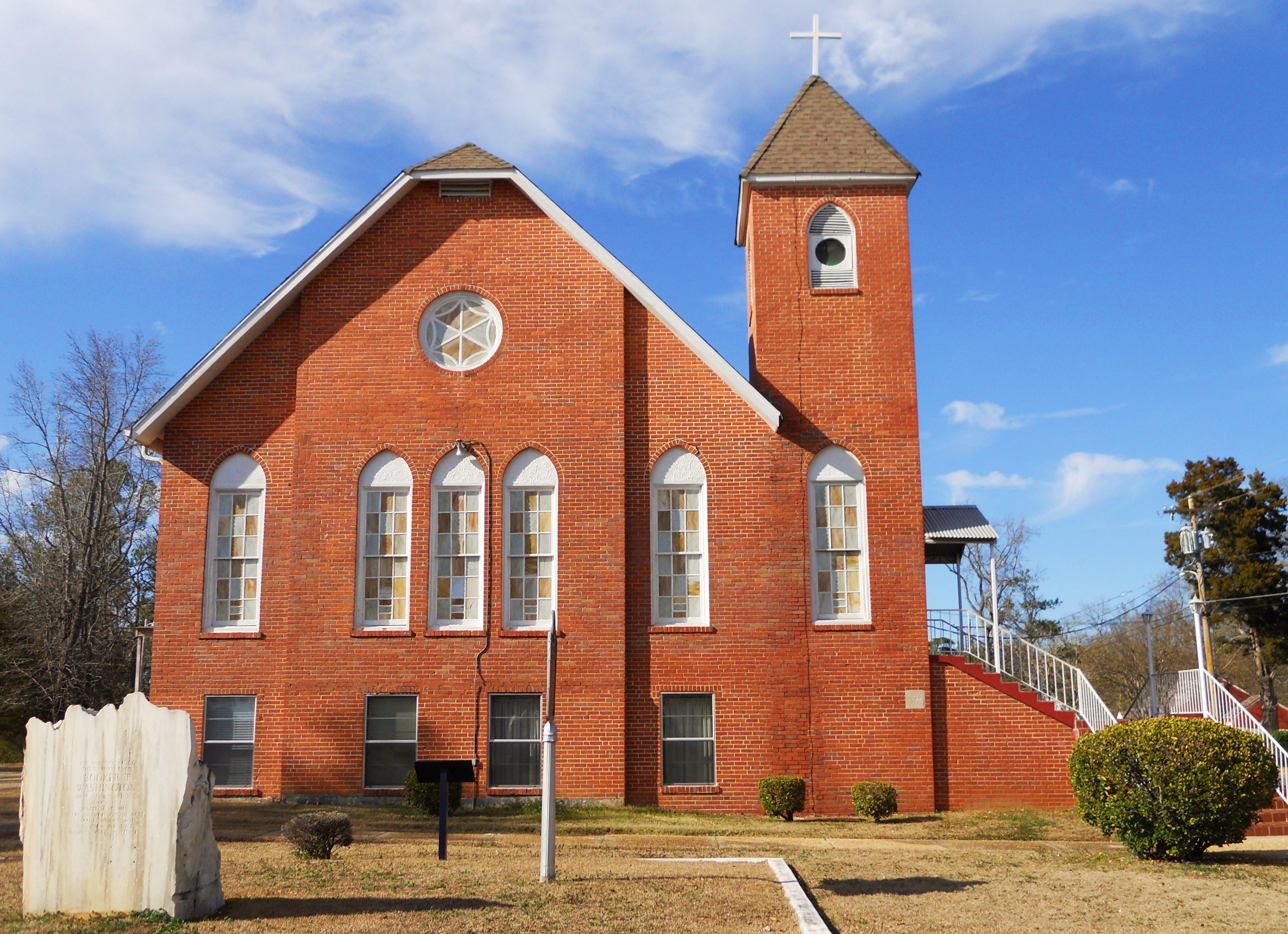
- Butler Chapel African Methodist Episcopal Zion Church in 2011

- Location within Alabama Location within the United States
- Location: 1002 N. Church St., Tuskegee, Alabama
- Coordinates: 32°25′7″N 85°41′58″W
- Area: less than one acre
- Built: 1957
- Architectural style: Late Gothic Revival
- NRHP reference No.: 95001022

Significant dates
- Added to NRHP: August 28, 1995
- Designated ARLH: April 16, 1985

Butler Chapel African Methodist Episcopal Zion Church is a historic church at 1002 N. Church Street in Tuskegee, Alabama. Built in 1957, it was added to the Alabama Register of Landmarks and Heritage in 1985 and the National Register of Historic Places in 1995. It was an important location associated with the civil rights movement of the 1950s and '60s.

The church was founded by Rev. John M. Butler in late 1865. There were at least two earlier church buildings, built in 1867 and 1887, respectively. A shanty on the grounds of the church was the birthplace of Tuskegee Normal School, now Tuskegee University, on July 4, 1881.
