= Bibliotherapy =

Form of psychotherapy involving reading

- MeSH: D001638

Bibliotherapy, also referred to as book therapy, reading therapy, poetry therapy, or therapeutic storytelling, is a creative arts therapy that involves the careful selection of the literature and the reading of specific written materials as therapeutic interventions to promote psychological healing and personal growth. This evidence-based practice leverages the therapeutic potential of the relationship between individuals and written language, including narrative fiction, poetry, memoirs, self-help literature, and other forms of written expression, to improve psychological well-being, manage mental health issues, and provide emotional support. Bibliotherapy partially overlaps with writing therapy and is often combined with it in clinical and therapeutic practice.

As a form of supportive psychotherapy, bibliotherapy functions as a brief, structured self-help intervention that employs a standard manuals to help individuals acquire emotion regulation skills through established therapeutic frameworks, primarily behavioral therapy or cognitive therapy techniques. Two popular books used for this are The Feeling Good Handbook for cognitive therapy and Control Your Depression for behavioral therapy. The main advantage of this psychotherapy compared to cognitive behavioral therapy (CBT) is its cost-effectiveness. However, for complex presentations, CBT tends to have more positive treatment outcomes. It has been shown to be effective in the treatment of mild to moderate depression, with cognitive bibliotherapy having a long-lasting effect. Modest evidence also exists to the symptom reduction of alcohol dependence, self-harm and panic disorder.

Unstructured and more informal bibliotherapy fits under creative arts therapies, possibly including reading or activity recommendations by a librarian or health professional based on perceived therapeutic value. More structured bibliotherapy can be described as supportive psychotherapy, where more consideration is placed on the therapist in the selection of reading material and in including other activities to facilitate skill acquisition and symptom reduction. An important difference between the two is the greater empirical support of symptom reduction in bibliotherapy as a supportive psychotherapy.

== History ==
Bibliotherapy is an old concept in library science. According to the Greek historian Diodorus Siculus, in his monumental work Bibliotheca historica, there was a phrase above the entrance to the royal chamber where books were stored by King Ramses II of Egypt. Considered to be the oldest known library motto in the world, ψῡχῆς ἰατρεῖον (psykhes iatreion), is translated: "the house of healing for the soul". Galen, the extraordinary philosopher and physician to Marcus Aurelius of Rome, maintained a medical library in the first century A.D., used not only by himself but by the staff of the Sanctuary Asclepion, a Roman spa famous for its therapeutic waters and considered to be one of the first hospital centers in the world. As far back as 1272, the Koran was prescribed reading in the Al-Mansur Hospital in Cairo as medical treatment.

In the early 19th century, Benjamin Rush favored the use of literature in hospitals for both the "amusement and instruction of patients". By the middle of the century, Minson Galt II wrote on the uses of bibliotherapy in mental institutions, and by 1900 libraries were an important part of European psychiatric institutions.

After the term bibliotherapy was coined by Samuel McChord Crothers in an September 1916 Atlantic Monthly article, it eventually found its way into the medical lexicon. During World War I, the Library War Service stationed librarians in military hospitals, where they dispensed books to patients and developed the emerging "science" of bibliotherapy with hospital physicians. When they returned from the war, they tried to implement these ideas in hospital libraries. E. Kathleen Jones, the editor of the book series Hospital Libraries, was the library administrator for the McLean Hospital in Massachusetts. This influential work was first published in 1923, and then updated in 1939, and again in 1953. Pioneer librarian Sadie Peterson Delaney used bibliotherapy in her work at the VA Hospital in Tuskegee, Alabama, from 1924 to her death in 1958. Elizabeth Pomeroy, director of the Veterans Administration Library Service, published the results of her research in 1937 on the efficacy of bibliotherapy at VA hospitals. The United Kingdom, beginning in the 1930s, also began to show growth in the use of reading therapy in hospital libraries. Charles Hagberg-Wright, librarian of the London Library, speaking at the 1930 British Empire Red Cross Conference, spoke about the importance of bibliotherapy as part of "curative medicine" in hospitals. In addition, reports from the 1930 Public Health Conference about bibliotherapy were included in the British journal Lancet. By the 1920s, there were also training programs in bibliotherapy. One of the first to offer such training was the School of Library Science at Western Reserve University, followed by a program at the University of Minnesota School of Medicine.

With hospitals taking the lead, bibliotherapy principles and practice were developed in the United States. In the United Kingdom, some felt that bibliotherapy lagged behind the US and Joyce Coates, writing in the Library Association Record, felt that "the possibilities of bibliotherapy have yet to be fully explored". In 1966, the Association of Hospital and Institution Libraries, a division of the American Library Association, issued a working definition of bibliotherapy in recognition of its growing influence. Then, in the 1970s, Arleen McCarty Hynes, a proponent for the use of bibliotherapy, created the "Bibliotherapy Round Table" which sponsored lectures and publications dedicated to the practice.

== Changing definitions ==
In its most basic form, bibliotherapy is using books to aid people in solving the issues that they may be facing at a particular time. It consists of selecting reading material relevant to a client's life situation. Bibliotherapy has also been explained as "a process of dynamic interaction between the personality of the reader and literature – interaction which may be utilized for personal assessment, adjustment, and growth." Bibliotherapy for adults is a form of self-administered treatment in which structured materials provide a means to alleviate distress. The concept of the treatment is based on the human inclination to identify with others through their expressions in literature and art. For instance, a grieving child who reads, or is read a story about another child who has lost a parent, may feel less alone in the world.

The concept of bibliotherapy has widened over time to include self-help manuals without therapeutic intervention, or a therapist "prescribing" a movie that might provide needed catharsis to a client.

The Online Dictionary for Library and Information Science (2011) defines bibliotherapy as:

The use of books selected on the basis of content in a planned reading program designed to facilitate the recovery of patients suffering from mental illness or emotional disturbance. Ideally, the process occurs in three phases: personal identification of the reader with a particular character in the recommended work, resulting in psychological catharsis, which leads to rational insight concerning the relevance of the solution suggested in the text to the reader's own experience. Assistance of a trained psychotherapist is advised.

Two forms of bibliotherapy exist: clinical and developmental. Clinical bibliotherapy is solely used by qualified personnel in a therapeutic setting and developmental bibliotherapy is a useful tool to utilize before a problem arises. Developmental bibliotherapy can be useful for issues such as nightmares as children age. Developmental bibliotherapy is often used by teachers or parents; however, if an issue arises that a teacher or parent cannot handle, clinical bibliotherapy is needed.

== Clinical use ==
Although the term "bibliotherapy" was first coined by Samuel Crothers in 1916, the use of books to change behavior and reduce distress has a long history, dating back to the Middle Ages. When applied in a therapeutic context, bibliotherapy can comprise both fictional and non-fictional materials. Fictional bibliotherapy (e.g., novels, poetry) is a dynamic process, where the material is actively interpreted in light of the reader's circumstances. From a psychodynamic perspective, fictional materials are believed to be effective through the processes of identification, catharsis and insight. Through identification with a character in the story the reader gains an alternative position from which to view their own issues. By empathizing with the character, the client undergoes a form of catharsis through gaining hope and releasing emotional tension, which consequently leads to insights and behavioral change. Working with an imaginative journey and a specific selection of metaphors, proponents claim that a therapeutic story approach has the potential to shift an out of balance behavior or situation back towards wholeness or balance. A patient might also find it easier to talk about his issues if he and the therapist can pretend that they are talking about the character's issues. Proponents suggest that the story form offers a healing medium that allows the listener to embark on an imaginative journey, rather than being lectured or directly addressed about the issue.

McKenna et al. (2010) conducted a review on psychotherapies for older depressed people, which concluded that bibliotherapy is effective. Glavin et al. (2017) also conducted a review and concluded that bibliotherapy could effectively treat post-traumatic stress disorder, even though well-designed RTCs still need to ascertain this statement.

The use of bibliotherapy in mental health programs, including those for substance abuse, has been shown to be beneficial to patients in the United Kingdom where it is a popular resource.

=== Treatment tracks ===
Bibliotherapy can be performed using affective treatment techniques, cognitive behavioral therapy (CBT), and visual-based materials. Affective bibliotherapy relies upon fiction, which can aid participants. By empathizing with a story's character, the client undergoes a form of catharsis by gaining hope and releasing emotional tension. There can also be a connection made between the circumstances in a story and the reader's own personal issues. This, consequently, leads to insights and behavioral change. Bibliotherapy using CBT relies mainly on self-help books, which work to correct negative behaviors by offering alternative, positive actions. Visual-based materials, such as graphic novels, utilize both affective and CBT techniques.

==== Cognitive treatment ====
The gains achieved in cognitive bibliotherapy illustrate that the most important element in cognitive bibliotherapy is content of the program and not the individual interactions with a therapist. Bibliotherapy using CBT have been empirically tested the most and directed CBT appears to be the most prevalent methodology in the literature. The selection of CBT books is important since there are many on the market that purport to help. Pardeck's analysis on choosing books is quite instructive and much of his criteria mirror what librarians teach in information literacy. These include the authority of the author on the topic, the type of empirical support offered for treatment claims, the existence of studies testing its clinical efficacy, and a comparative review of other books.

==== Affective treatment ====
There is not as much research on using fiction in bibliotherapy when compared to cognitive self-help books. The recent work of Shechtman has been important in investigating the use of affective literature for bibliotherapy. In her work on counseling with aggressive boys, Shechtman discusses the deficits these children exhibit and describes affect disorders with symptoms of emotional arousal, low levels of empathy, and difficulties in self-expression. Using integrative treatment whereby the patient explores the problem, gains insight, and commits to change, Shechtman found that using affective bibliotherapy techniques achieved therapeutic change while indicating gains in empathy and insight.

==== Visual treatment and graphic novels ====
In the simplest sense, graphic novels are long-form comic books, usually 100 pages or more in length. The application of graphic novels in this context will allow people struggling with literacy to have better access to materials. Dozens of graphic novels have been published over the last decade that address public health topics, such as depression, drug abuse, and PTSD. Public health-based comic books originated in the 1940s. The earliest public health comics averaged around twelve pages and were aimed at preventive instruction for children. Over the last fifteen years, however, the genre has evolved and public health graphic novels and are now commonly 150 pages long and focus more on adult struggles with physical or mental illness. This change has gotten the attention of medical professionals who gather and evaluate these materials. Currently, a group of physicians, professors, artists, and bioethicists run the website Graphic Medicine and hosts an annual conference to discuss the use of graphic novels and comic books in health. There is a wide range of research that indicates graphic novels are an effective tool for people struggling with literacy and communication problems. They also have been shown to be effective with populations that have trouble with traditional literacy instruction. Resistance to learning can take many forms, some of which can be seen in populations involved with the criminal justice system. Graphic novels are most often used to entice the group referred to as "reluctant readers", people who have abandoned reading for pleasure. While this group may be literate in the basic sense, research shows that people who read for pleasure continuously improve vocabulary and language skills, skills that can help people rehabilitate after incarceration. Research shows graphic novels are of use to students with traditional learning disabilities, like dyslexia, and also have been shown to be effective when used in a bibliotherapeutic context to assist people with mental illness in explaining their own struggles to others. Graphic novels have also been described by professionals in the field as especially apt for portraying the struggles associated with mental illness.

== Non-clinical use ==
Non-clinical bibliotherapy can consist solely of reading, or it can be complemented by discussion or play activity. A child might be asked to draw a scene from the book or asked whether a commonality is felt with a particular character in the book. The book can be used to draw out a child on a subject (s)he has been hesitant to discuss.

Of necessity, bibliotherapy originally used existing texts. Literature that touched on the particular subject relevant to the child provided the source material. (For example, Romeo and Juliet is typically read in 8th or 9th grade as Romeo is 15 and Juliet is 13; students at that age can identify with them.) More recently, it has become possible to find texts targeted to the situation; e.g., many of the Berenstain Bears books target particular behaviors and responses to certain situations.

Many therapeutic stories are written for specific individual needs, but practitioners have also used them to build psychological resilience when groups and communities face challenges. For example, therapeutic storytelling can play a role in creating inclusive classroom and work communities. Therapeutic stories are also sometimes referred to as "healing stories". In the US, the National Storytelling Network has a special interest group called the Healing Story Alliance.

=== In pedagogy ===
Claimed advantages of bibliotherapy include teaching students to solve problems, helping students to cope with teasing, name-calling, mockery, fears, sexuality changes, anxiety, and death.

Implementing bibliotherapy in an elementary classroom can be very beneficial to both the students and the teacher. Teachers who use bibliotherapy in their classroom also learn much about the children they teach. Teachers as practitioners of bibliotherapy select appropriate reading materials and match them to the needs of individual students to assist them in the development of self-awareness, problem-solving skills, perspective-taking, and understanding of problems. The materials may include "any literacy activity, including reading (fiction, nonfiction, or poetry), creative writing, or storytelling." Teachers that select appropriate literature for their classroom needs may provide a child with a "character in a story to help the child understand himself Classroom story time and a guided discussion allows students to "become aware of problems of other children and develop empathy".

In the article "Read two books and write me in the morning", the authors highlight the fact that teachers are an integral part of a student's therapeutic team. It is the teacher who may be the first person to notice that something is troubling a child. They also note that teachers have been referred to as carryover agents, who carry out recommendations from other professionals who have suggested accommodations necessary to ensure a particular student's well-being or success in their classroom. In inclusive classrooms, the teacher and the whole class play a role in meeting, directly or indirectly, the needs of students with exceptionalities. Bibliotherapy can help the students in the class learn coping skills that will help them deal with the social and emotional challenges that may occur. Books and reading are an integral part of classroom life. Through books, "children are able to see reflections of themselves, their times, their country, their concerns... well-written realistic fiction will always help readers gain a deeper understanding of themselves and others."

Bibliotherapy has three recognized stages: (1) identification, (2) catharsis, and (3) insight. Identification is when a reader associates themselves with the character or situation in the literary work. Catharsis is when the reader shares many of the same thoughts and feelings of the characters in the literary work, and insight is when the reader realizes that they relate to the character or situation and learn to deal more effectively with their own personal issues. Literary pieces allow teachers to identify for their class, or an individual student, a particular issue that they are dealing with directly or indirectly. In a class with a special needs student, for example, books featuring a character with the same needs will help students experience living with a chronic condition; through a guided discussion, they will be able to verbalize their thoughts and concerns. This exercise will offer insight into the issue of how to help their classmate effectively. Bibliotherapy "does not prescribe meanings, nor is it a form of direct teaching; it is more an invitation and permission giving to children to unveil wisdom and insight that might otherwise be squelched."

Teachers who practice or need to use bibliotherapy can find connections to their state or provincial guidelines. A common challenge for classroom teachers is finding the right book, and although some annotated bibliographies are available online and in curriculum publications, not all issues are touched upon. A teacher may have to find their book. The following evaluation framework is suggested:

"Is the story simple, clear, brief, non-repetitious, and believable? Is it at an appropriate reading level and developmental level? Does the story fit with relevant feelings, needs, interests, and goals? Does it demonstrate cultural diversity, gender inclusivity, and sensitivity to aggression? Do characters show coping skills, and does the problem situation show resolution?"

There are steps that make bibliotherapy a more effective solution for dealing with the issues that a student may be facing, including developing support, trust, and confidence with the student with an issue, identifying other school personnel that could aid in implementing the therapy, seeking support from the student's parents or guardians, defining the issue that the student is facing and why the teacher wants to help solve it, creating goals that may help the student overcome the issue, researching books that may help with the specific problem, introducing the book to all the people that will be involved, incorporating reading activities, and evaluating the effects and successes that the book may have had on the student.

=== For older adults ===
Bibliotherapy has been studied by Jennie Bolitho (2011) in relation to libraries, health, and social connection for the elderly. Bolitho set up a pilot reading program where she read the text aloud to a group of participants at a local aged care hostel. Her evaluation at the end of the 12-week program described all responses as positive, and participants commented that they "look forward to the group as it made them think for themselves and gave them something to think about aside from their ailments and the monotony of the day" (p. 90).

=== Criticism ===
Non-clinical bibliotherapy has not been widely researched to ensure that it will be successful for all students. It has many drawbacks, which include unavailable literature on certain topics that students may be struggling with, many students not being ready to face their issues and read, and students and parents defensively implementing the therapy. The resistance of using bibliotherapy is based on a lack of assertiveness, negative attitudes, anxiety, depression, sexual dysfunctions, and negative behaviors. There has been advocacy for reading books containing difficult themes in advance, rather than in response to a parent or teacher identifying a specific issue in a child's life. The major issue that lies behind bibliotherapy is the lack of research that has been conducted on this therapy device.

== Bibliography ==
- Psychology writing (2024). "What Is Bibliotherapy".
- American Library Association (2011). "Bibliotherapy". Archived from the original on 2017-11-12.
- Australian Public Libraries Summit. (n.d.). "A bibliotherapy partnership between public libraries and health services" (PDF). Archived from the original (PDF) on September 16, 2009.
- Bergner, Raymond M. (2007). "Therapeutic storytelling revisited". American Journal of Psychotherapy. 61 (2): 149–162. doi:10.1176/appi.psychotherapy.2007.61.2.149. ISSN 0002-9564. PMID 17760319.
- Bolitho, J. (2011). "Reading into wellbeing: Bibliotherapy, libraries, health and social connection". Aplis. 24 (2): 89–90. ISSN 1030-5033.
- Brandell, Jerrold R (2017). Of mice and metaphors: therapeutic storytelling with children. SAGE Publications. ISBN 978-1-5063-0559-2.
- Brewster, L. (2009). "Books on prescription: Bibliotherapy in the United Kingdom". Journal of Hospital Librarianship. 9 (4): 399–407. doi:10.1080/15323260903253456. S2CID 71840009.
- Broome, Hamish (2015-11-20). "The Lennox author who heals children with her stories". Daily Telegraph.
- Burns, George W (2001). 101 healing stories: using metaphors in therapy. New York: Wiley. ISBN 978-0-471-39589-8.
- Burrows, Leigh (2008). "Max and the knight: how a therapeutic story provided a connection point for child, family, school, human service agencies and community". In Bottrell, D; Meagher, G (eds.). Communities and change: selected papers. Sydney: Sydney University Press. pp. 107–139. ISBN 978-1-920898-84-7.
- Burrows, Leigh (2013). "Transforming 'The Red Beast' Within Through Mindfulness and Therapeutic Storytelling: A Case Study". Journal of Psychologists and Counsellors in Schools. 23 (2): 172–184. doi:10.1017/jgc.2013.17.
- Campbell, Siobhán, Sara Haslam, and Edmund G. C. King, eds. 2025. A Hundred Years of Bibliotherapy : Healing through Books. Abingdon, Oxon; New York, NY: Routledge.
- Crothers, S. McC. (September 1916). "A Literary Clinic". The Atlantic Monthly. Vol. 118, no. 3. pp. 291–301.
- Curran, Christina M; Petersen, Amy J (2017). Handbook of research on classroom diversity and inclusive education practice. IGI Global. ISBN 978-1-5225-2521-9.
- Doll, Beth; Doll, Carol Ann (1997). Bibliotherapy with young people: librarians and mental health professionals working together. Englewood, Colo.: Libraries Unlimited. ISBN 978-0-585-14748-2.
- Dwivedi, Kedar Nath (2006). The Therapeutic Use of Stories. Taylor and Francis. ISBN 978-0-415-15071-2.
- Mahoney, Mary (2017). "From Library War Service to Science: Bibliotherapy in World War I" (Online exhibition). Books as Medicine.
- McLaine, Susan (2012). "Bibliotherapy: Reading for Wellbeing in Old Age" (PDF).
- Muller, K. (February 15, 2011). "Bibliotherapy". American Libraries. Archived from the original on June 29, 2016.
- Perrow, Susan (2016). Therapeutic storytelling: 101 healing stories for children. Gloucestershire: Hawthorn Press. ISBN 978-1-907359-15-6.
- Pierce, J. B. (2010). "Youth matters: A feeling for books". American Libraries. Archived from the original on 2013-03-22.
- Skočić Mihić, Sanja; Maich, Kimberly; Belcher, Christina; Perrow, Susan; Barišić, Ana; Ramić, Nadia Novak (2017). "The Role of Bibliotherapy and Therapeutic Storytelling in Creating Inclusive Classroom Communities". In Curran, Christina M; Petersen, Amy J. (eds.). Handbook of Research on Classroom Diversity and Inclusive Education Practice. IGI Global.
- Sunderland, Margot (2017). Using story telling as a therapeutic tool with children. London: Routledge. ISBN 978-0-86388-425-2.
- U.S. Department of Veterans Affairs (February 2009). "VA bibliography reference guide" (PDF).
