= Smith Metropolitan AME Zion Church =

Historic church in New York, United States

- U.S. National Register of Historic Places
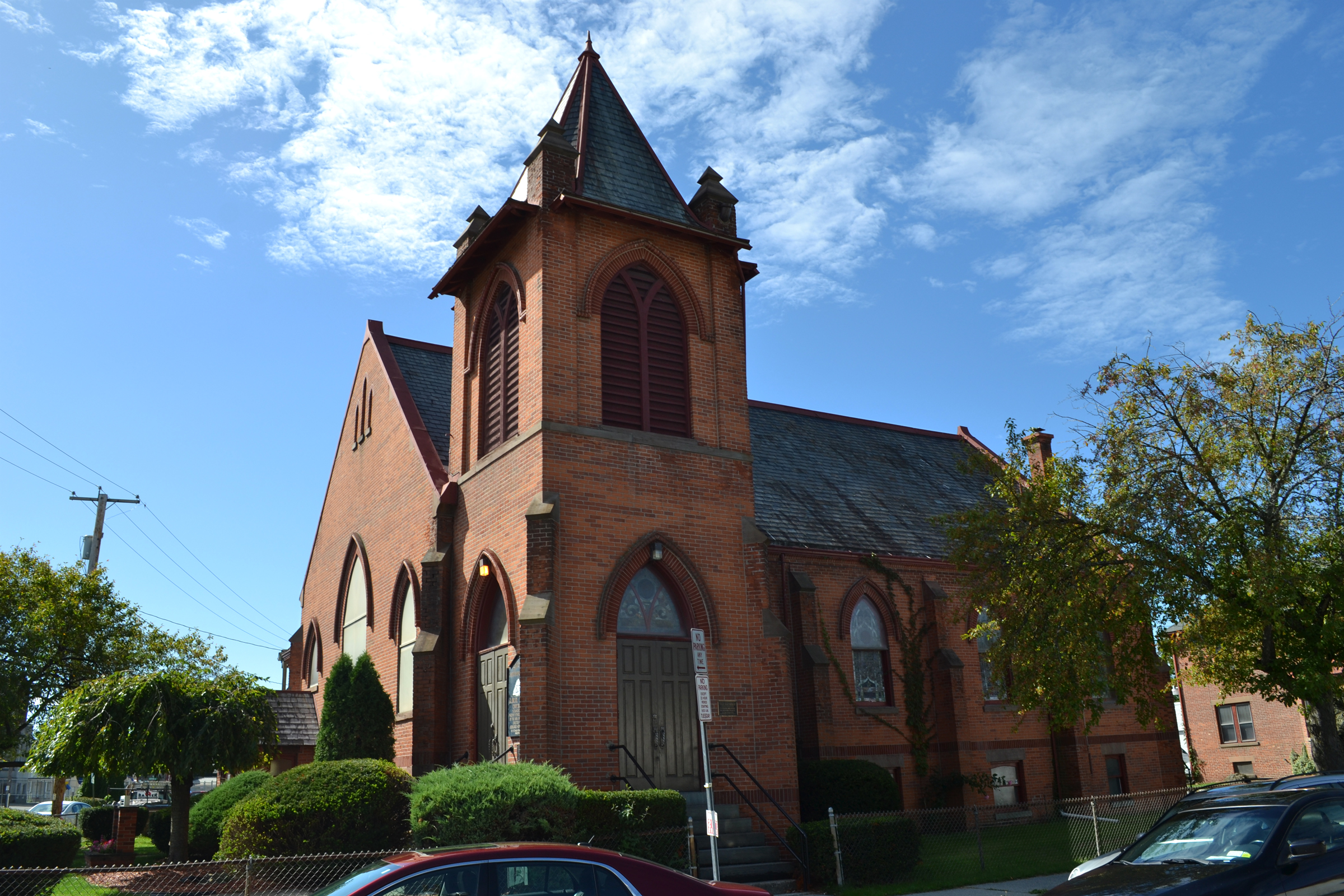
- The church in October 2015

- Location within New York Location within the United States
- Location: Jct. of Smith and Cottage Sts., Poughkeepsie, New York
- Coordinates: 41°42′23″N 73°54′58″W
- Area: 1 acre (0.40 ha)
- Built: 1910
- Architect: Carpenter, DuBois
- Architectural style: Late Gothic Revival
- NRHP reference No.: 91001724
- Added to NRHP: November 21, 1991

Smith Metropolitan AME Zion Church is a historic African Methodist Episcopal Zion Church located at Smith and Cottage Streets in Poughkeepsie, Dutchess County, New York. It is the oldest predominantly African-American church in Dutchess County, NY. The church was a part of The Underground Railroad led by Civil Rights leader Harriet Tubman. The first black female judge in America, Ms. Jane Bolin, was a member of this church, along with other influential people. The church has experienced phenomenal new growth under the leadership of their Pastor, Reverend Edwrin Sutton. The Church as a ministry began in 1836. The church building was built between 1908 and 1910, with the parsonage added in 1914. The one-story, rectangular Gothic Revival church has an attached two-story bell tower topped by a pyramidal roof and a raised basement. The brick building features pointed arched openings and stained glass windows.

It was added to the National Register of Historic Places in 1991.
