= Creek Stand, Alabama =

Unincorporated community in Alabama, United States

- Unincorporated community
- Location in Alabama Location in the United States
- Coordinates: 32°17′41″N 85°28′39″W
- Country: United States
- State: Alabama
- County: Macon
- Elevation: 446 ft (136 m)
- Time zone: UTC-6 (Central (CST))
  - Summer (DST): UTC-5 (CDT)
- Area code: 334
- GNIS feature ID: 116837

Creek Stand (also Creekstand) is an unincorporated community in Macon County, Alabama, United States.

== History ==
The community is named due to its being founded on the former site of a Creek Indian village. A post office operated under the name Creek Stand from 1850 to 1921.

Creek Stand is located along the route of the Federal Road. A tavern was located in Creek Stand that was operated by Tustunnuggee Hopoie (Little Prince), who was the headman of Coweta and a Speaker for the Lower Creek.

The Creek Stand A.M.E. Zion Church was founded in 1895 and the adjacent cemetery was listed on the National Register of Historic Places in 2016. The cemetery contains several graves of people who were involved in the Tuskegee Syphilis Study.

== Gallery ==
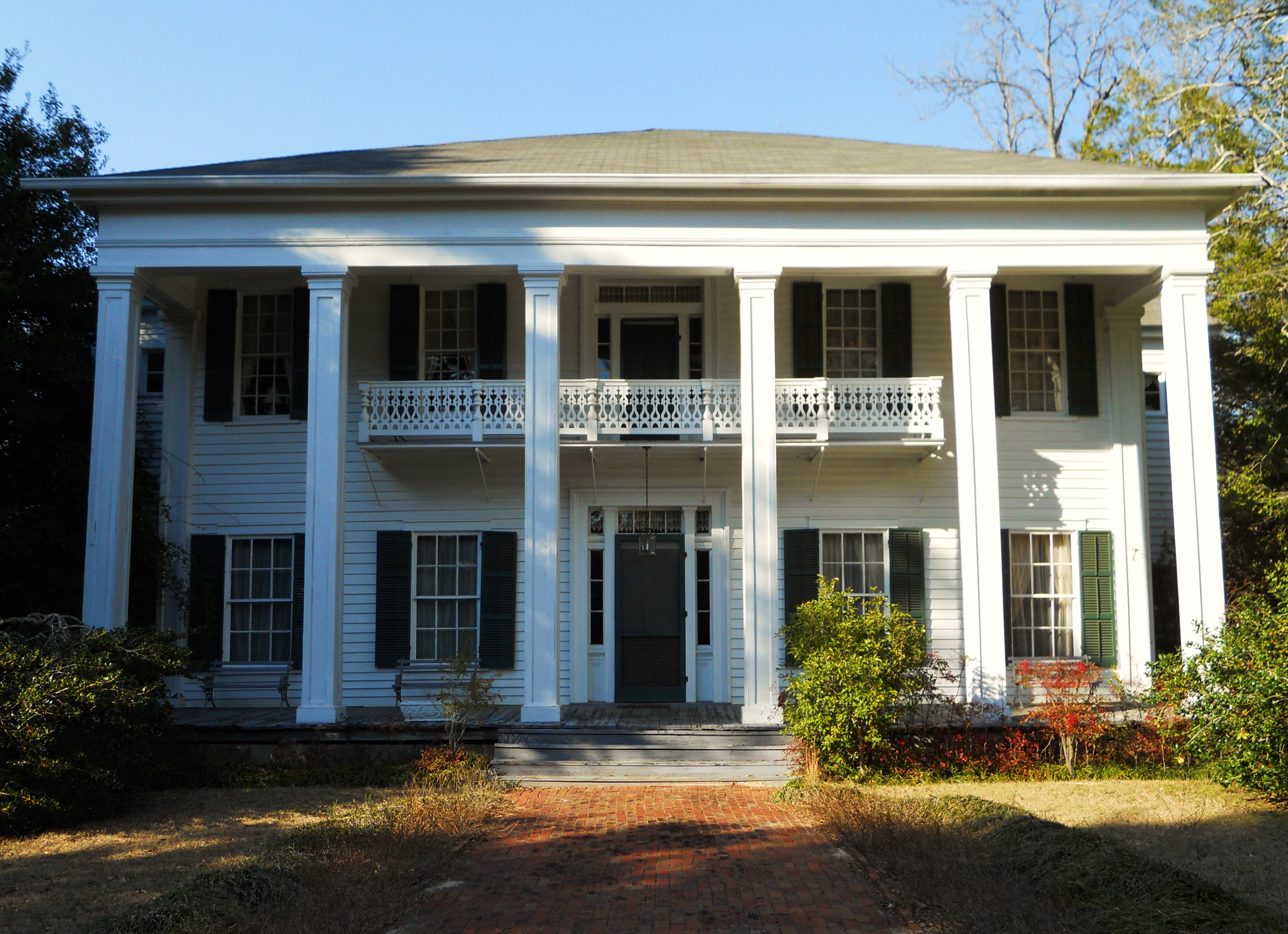
Creekwood is a Greek Revival home in Creek Stand, Alabama. It was built circa 1844 and placed on the National Register of Historic Places in 1989.
