= Tuskegee Veterans Administration Medical Center =

Old soldiers' home in Tuskegee, Alabama, USA

- Tuskegee Veterans Administration Hospital
- U.S. National Register of Historic Places
- Alabama Register of Landmarks and Heritage
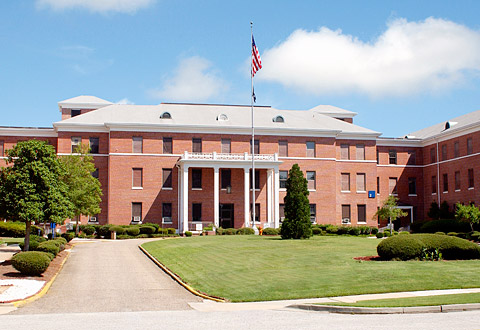

- Location within Alabama Location within the United States
- Location: Tuskegee, Alabama
- Coordinates: 32°26′43″N 85°42′47″W
- Built: 1923
- NRHP reference No.: 12000140

Significant dates
- Added to NRHP: March 19, 2012
- Designated ARLH: April 14, 1992

The Tuskegee Veterans Administration Medical Center began in 1923 as an old soldiers' home in Tuskegee, Alabama. It was originally called the Tuskegee Home, part of the National Home for Disabled Volunteer Soldiers system.

The home-hospital, eventually 27 buildings, was developed next to the Tuskegee Normal and Industrial Institute campus (now Tuskegee University) on 464 acres (188 ha), with 300 acres of the property donated by the institute.

Its medical purpose was to provide long-term care for the 300,000 African-American veterans in the segregated South from World War I; such care was often denied or neglected at other veterans' hospitals and old soldiers' homes. Medical care of veterans after the war was one of a number of issues complicated by race; the government was struggling to get veterans employed, to develop programs for those who were disabled, as well as to treat those needing medical treatment. Having served their country, veterans wanted the federal government to intercede as they tried to re-enter society.

In 1930 three agencies were combined as the Veterans Administration, and the hospital center was put under its authority. Since 1997 the hospital complex has been part of the Central Alabama Veterans Health Care System; it is known as the East Campus of its four sites in Alabama and Georgia.

== History ==
The home-hospital was developed to provide care for African-American veterans of World War I, who complained about difficulties in getting served in other facilities, particularly in the segregated South. Civil rights groups such as the National Association for the Advancement of Colored People lobbied the federal government on its responsibilities to care for such veterans in providing health as well as employment and retraining services. Plans were made to open the hospital April first with a full white staff of white doctors and white nurses with colored nurse-maids for each white nurse, in order to save them from contact with colored patients.

The hospital's early emphasis was to be on treating tuberculosis, and mental illness related to combat and shell shock, the two diseases most often diagnosed in veterans after the war. While whites had resisted giving care to African-American veterans, particularly in the South, once Congress had authorized the veterans hospital at Tuskegee, whites in the city and the state started maneuvering to control the medical jobs at the new facility.

At the same time, African Americans wanted the hospital to be a place where they could get professional jobs. Dr. Robert Russa Moton, president of Tuskegee Institute, had to maneuver carefully to maintain local relations in the city, where whites were pushing to control jobs at the hospital. At the same time, he was under considerable pressure from the NAACP and the National Medical Association (made up of black doctors) to help guarantee professional jobs for black doctors and nurses at the center, who were restricted in their opportunities, especially in Alabama. Together with representatives of the NAACP and NMA, he appealed directly to Republican President Warren G. Harding, on the grounds that his party would lose the support of blacks, many of whom had supported the nation in the war, unless he helped them get jobs at this center. Harding directed regional and veterans' officials to ensure that black doctors and nurses were recruited for the center and eventually committed to these positions being reserved for blacks. There was so much opposition to this among whites in Tuskegee that Moton received threats on his life, and made plans to go on a lecture tour. The Harding administration, made Dr. R. R. Moton a sort of referee for 12 million Negroes as to the personnel of the hospital and the Veterans’ Bureau promised him categorically that he would be consulted before anybody was appointed superintendent of the hospital. Colonel Robert H. Stanley, a white man, was made superintendent of the hospital and arrived at Tuskegee two days before Dr. Moton was notified.

Members of a local chapter of the Ku Klux Klan marched on the hospital, but their action resulted in a broader campaign by the NAACP and NMA, attracting national attention. Tuskegee whites did not gain the support of others in the South. The VA invited their participation in selection of a railroad route to serve the hospital. By 1924, the situation had calmed and Brig. Gen. Frank T. Hines, the director of the Veterans Bureau, appointed Dr. Joseph H. Ward, an African American, to head the hospital complex. During the next decade, "half of all black veterans who received hospital care were treated at Tuskegee, and all the black doctors employed by the Veterans Bureau worked there." While arguments continued over segregated federal facilities (the NAACP refused to support proposals for an exclusive African-American VA hospital in the North), the civil rights movement of this period helped ensure that black veterans gained access to top care and services, and that African Americans gained access to professional jobs in the health system. Dr. Moton wrote to President Harding and told him that if negro physicians and nurses were debarred from service in the hospital without at least being given a chance to qualify under the civil service rules it would bring justifiable criticism upon him and upon the Harding Administration.

The hospital opened with 600 beds and 250 patients. The first medical officer appointed in charge was Colonel Robert H. Stanley, who was white, but within a year, the government appointed African-American officials at the top levels, and many doctors were black. In 1930 the facilities were transferred to the United States Veterans Administration hospital system when that independent agency was established. By 1973, the medical complex had 2307 beds, including those in a 120-bed nursing home.

Dr. Toussaint T. Tildon was a psychiatrist, Harvard Medical School graduate and one of the first six African-American doctors recruited to the new hospital. He worked at the center for 34 years, for the last 12 serving as director, from 1946 to 1958. Beginning in the 1940s, he worked with the Veterans Administration and participating universities to gain full accreditation for residency programs at the center in medicine, surgery, or dentistry, in cooperation with the medical and dental schools at the University of Alabama and Emory University. He also worked to ensure that black doctors could get good jobs with the federal government at its medically related agencies and facilities. Many additional residency programs were established at the veterans center during the following decades.

In 1997 administration of this center was merged with a VA center in Montgomery, Alabama, and outpatient clinics in Dothan, Alabama and in Columbus, Georgia, forming the Central Alabama Veterans Health Care System. The Tuskegee facility is now called the East Campus of the CAVHCS. The four sites together serve 134,000 veterans in 43 counties in the central and southeastern portions of Alabama and western Georgia. With more care being provided on an outpatient basis, the center has 143 Hospital beds, 160 Nursing Home Care Unit beds, and 43 Homeless Domiciliary.

In 2012 the Tuskegee complex was listed on the National Register of Historic Places.

=== Managing directors ===
- Dr. Charles W. Griffith, 1923–24
- Dr. Joseph H. Ward, 1924–36
- Dr. Eugene Dibble, 1936–46
- Dr. Toussaint T. Tildon, 1946–58
- Dr. Prince P. Barker, 1958–59
- Dr. Howard W. Kenney, 1959–62
- Dr. Julian W. Giles, 1962–69
- Dr. Robert S. Wilson, 1969–72
- Lucian A. Green, 1972-197?
- Dr. David A. Tull, 1976–86
- 1997, merger and Central Alabama Veterans Health Care System (CAVHCS) established, with Tuskegee as the East Campus
- Shirley Bealer, Acting Director, CAVHCS, 2008
- Linda Boyle, 2016-2019
- Amir Farooqi, 2019–present
