= Tate Gymnasium =

- U.S. National Register of Historic Places
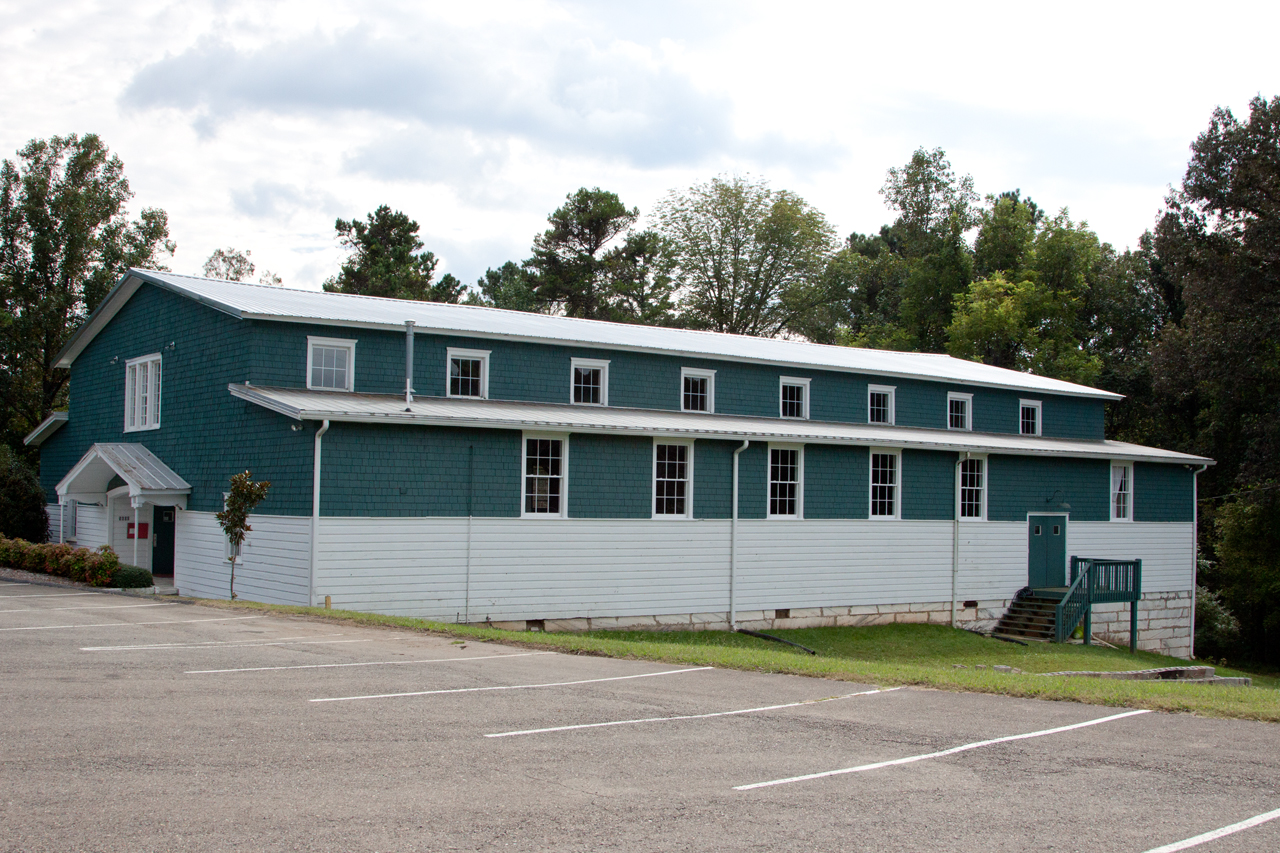

- Location within Georgia Location within the United States
- Location: 5600 GA 53 E, Tate, Georgia
- Coordinates: 34°25′4″N 84°22′51″W
- Area: 1.1 acres (0.45 ha)
- NRHP reference No.: 02001493
- Added to NRHP: December 12, 2002

Tate Gymnasium is a historic building in Tate, Georgia built in 1923 to serve the local high school. It was added to the National Register of Historic Places on December 12, 2002. It is located at 5600 Georgia 53 East.

It was built by Col. Sam Tate, president of Georgia Marble Company, workers of that company, and other "community artisans", with all expenses paid by the Colonel and the Georgia Marble Company.

== See also ==
- Georgia Marble Company and Tate Historic District
- Tate House (Tate, Georgia)
- National Register of Historic Places listings in Pickens County, Georgia
