= Georgia in the American Civil War =

Coordinates: 33°N 83.5°W

Georgia
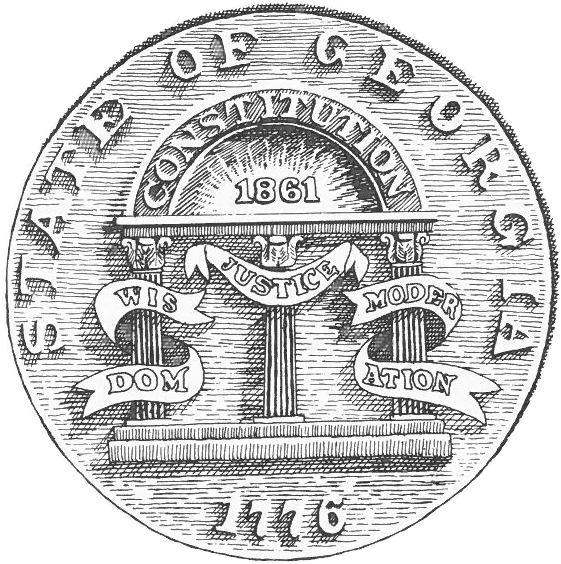
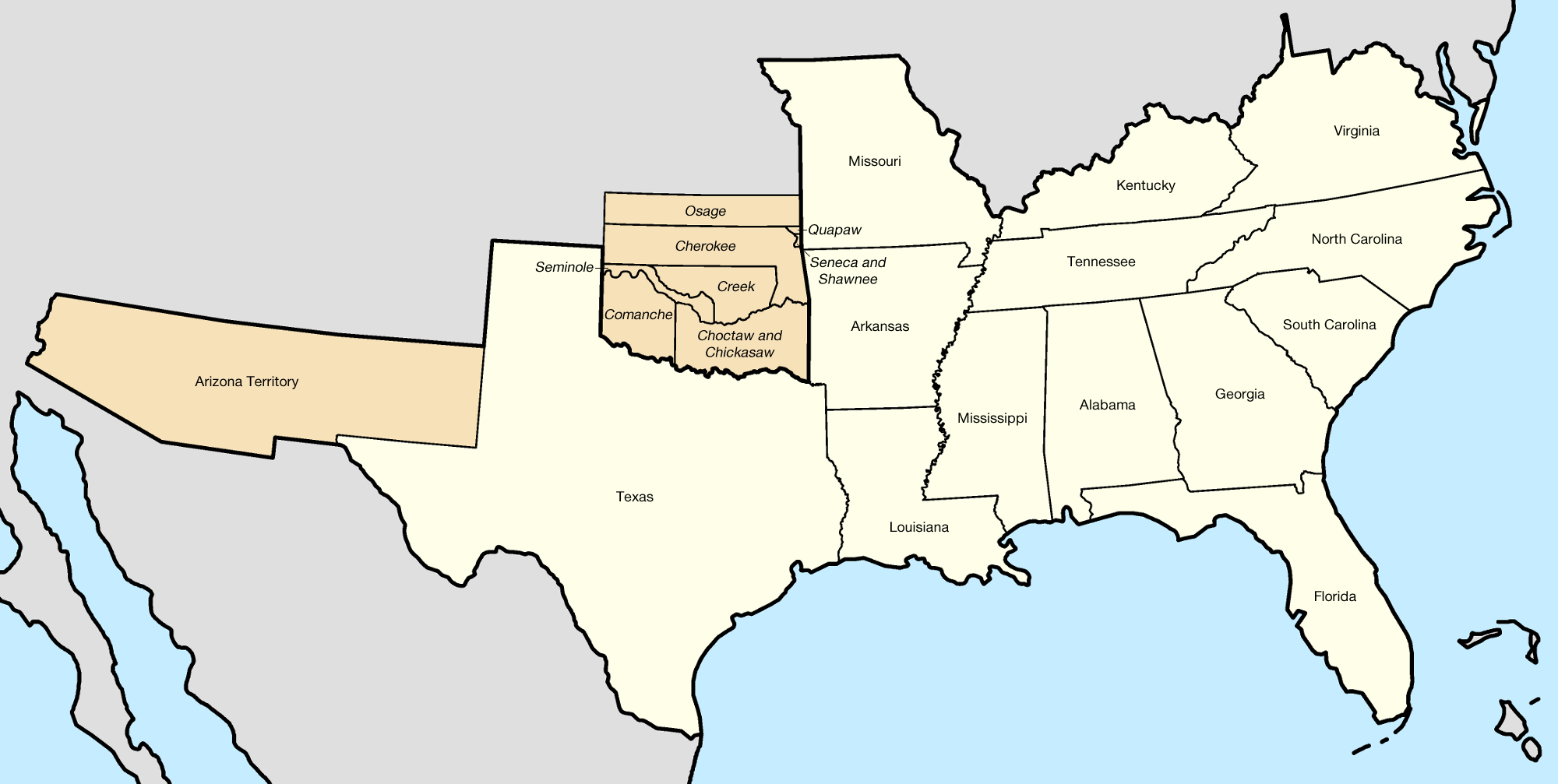
- Variant flag (de facto) (Note: "A surviving Georgia flag in the collection of the Museum of the Confederacy in Richmond . . . places the arms on a red field" (Cannon 2005, p. 39).) Seal (1863–1865) Map of the Confederate States
- Capital: Milledgeville
- Largest city: Savannah
- Admitted to the Confederacy: March 16, 1861 (2nd)
- Population: 1,057,286 total; • 595,088 (56.29%) free; • 462,198 (43.71%) slave
- Forces supplied: - Confederate soldiers: 120,000; Union soldiers: 5,000 (3,500 black; 2,500 white) total
- Major garrisons/armories: Fort Pulaski
- Governor: Joseph E. Brown (surrendered)
- Senators: Benjamin Harvey Hill; John Wood Lewis, Sr. Herschel Vespasian Johnson
- Representatives: List
- Restored to the Union: July 15, 1870

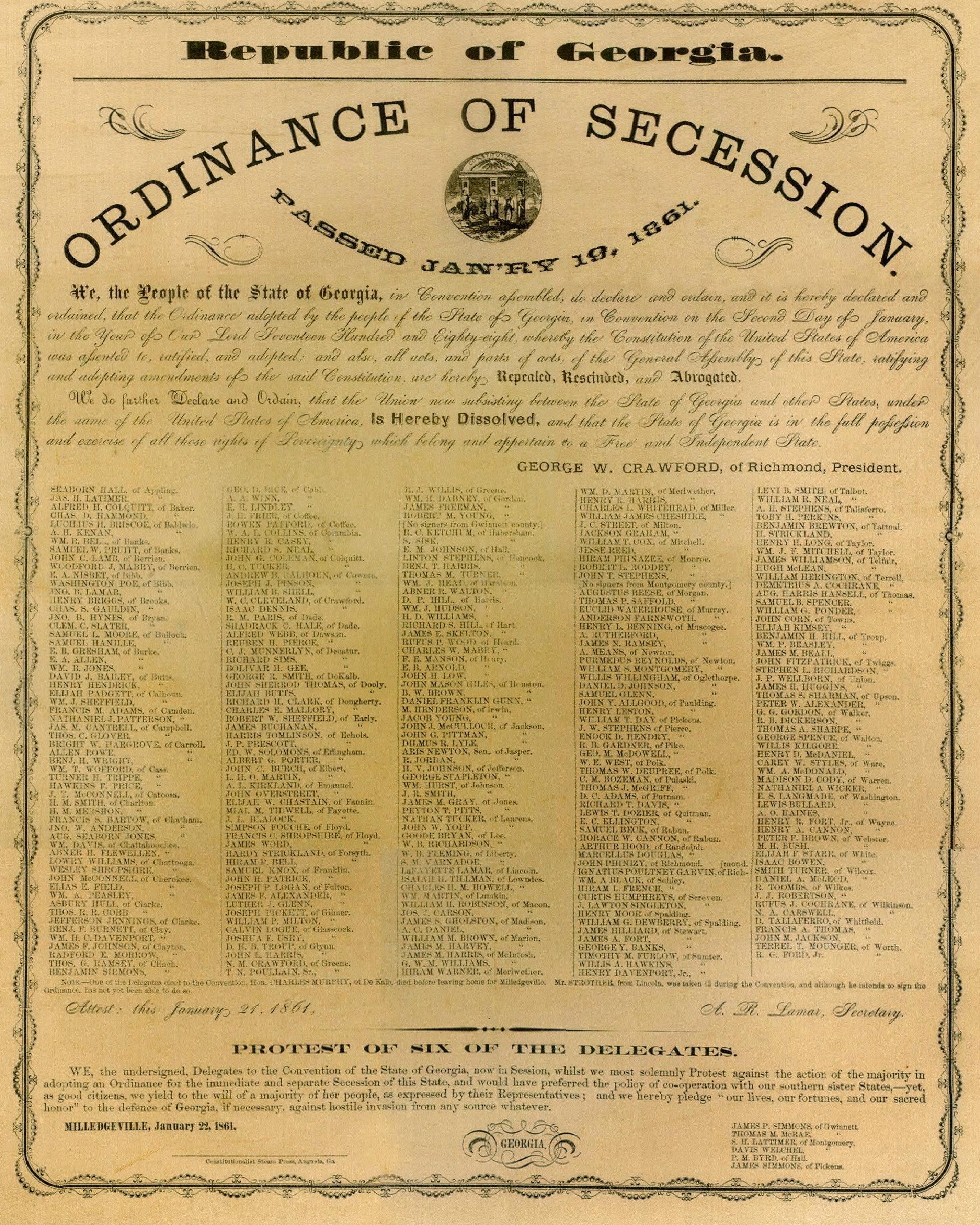
Facsimile of the 1861 Ordinance of Secession signed by 293 delegates to the Georgia Secession Convention at the statehouse in Milledgeville, Georgia January 21, 1861

Georgia was one of the original seven slave states that formed the Confederate States of America in February 1861, triggering the U.S. Civil War. The state governor, Democrat Joseph E. Brown, wanted locally raised troops to be used only for the defense of Georgia, in defiance of Confederate president Jefferson Davis, who wanted to deploy them on other battlefronts. When the Union blockade prevented Georgia from exporting its plentiful cotton in exchange for key imports, Brown ordered farmers to grow food instead, but the breakdown of transport systems led to desperate shortages.

There was not much fighting in Georgia until September 1863, when Confederates under Braxton Bragg defeated William S. Rosecrans at Chickamauga Creek. In May 1864, William T. Sherman started pursuing the Confederates towards Atlanta, which he captured in September, in advance of his March to the Sea. This six-week campaign destroyed much of the civilian infrastructure of Georgia, decisively shortening the war. When news of the march reached Robert E. Lee's army in Virginia, whole Georgian regiments deserted, feeling they were needed at home. The Battle of Columbus, fought on the Georgia-Alabama border on April 16, 1865, is reckoned by some criteria to have been the last battle of the war.

== Secession ==
In December 1860, Georgia Governor Joseph E. Brown, a staunch defender of slavery and states' rights, declared that the election of Abraham Lincoln, an anti-slavery Republican, would inevitably lead to the abolition of slavery in the United States. Brown urged Georgians to resist what he saw as Northern aggression, warning that failure to act would result in the loss of their enslaved labor:

What will be the result to the institution of slavery, which will follow submission to the inauguration and administration of Mr. Lincoln as the President ... it will be the total abolition of slavery ... I do not doubt, therefore, that submission to the administration of Mr. Lincoln will result in the final abolition of slavery. If we fail to resist now, we will never again have the strength to resist.

— Joseph E. Brown, Letter, December 7, 1860

Later that month, following South Carolina's ordinance of secession, celebrations erupted in Savannah, Georgia. In January 1861, the Georgia Secession Convention issued its own ordinance, citing the Republican Party’s anti-slavery platform and perceived Northern support for Black equality as key reasons for secession:

The people of Georgia having dissolved their political connection with the Government of the United States of America, present ... the causes which have led to the separation. For the last ten years we have had numerous and serious causes of complaint against our non-slaveholding confederate States, with reference to the subject of African slavery. ... The party of Lincoln ... is admitted to be an anti-slavery party ... anti-slavery is its mission and its purpose. ... The prohibition of slavery in the territories, hostility to it everywhere, the equality of the black and white races ... were boldly proclaimed by its leaders ...

— Georgia Secession Convention, Georgia Declaration of Causes of Secession, January 29, 1861

The convention vote was marred by manipulation; secessionists "cooked the numbers" and required all delegates to pledge support for secession, regardless of their personal vote.

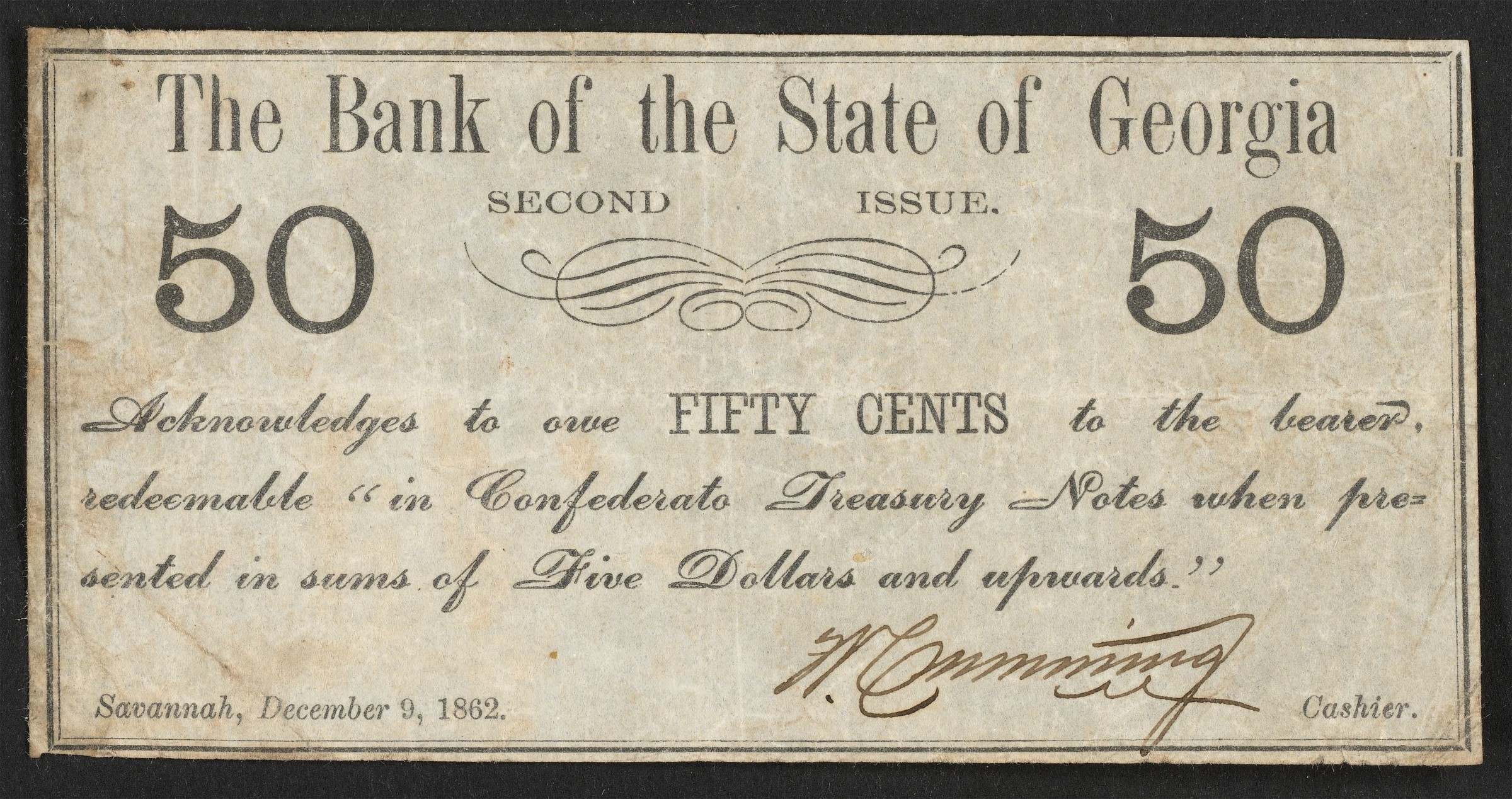
1862 Bank of the State of Georgia 50 cent banknote, redeemable in Confederate Treasury Notes

In a speech to the Virginia Secession Convention in February 1861, Georgian delegate Henry L. Benning asserted that Georgia seceded out of "a deep conviction ... that a separation from the North was the only thing that could prevent the abolition of her slavery."

Similarly, Mississippi secession commissioner William L. Harris told Georgia legislators that Republicans aimed to promote "equality between the white and negro races," and that secession was essential to resist their policies.

Religious leaders in Georgia also defended slavery. One preacher condemned abolitionists and Republicans, claiming their views were "diametrically opposed to the letter and spirit of the Bible, and as subversive of all sound morality, as the worst ravings of infidelity."

== Home front ==
Governor Joseph E. Brown was a leading secessionist and led efforts to remove the state from the Union and into the Confederacy. A firm believer in state's rights, he defied the Confederate government's wartime policies. He resisted the Confederate military draft and tried to keep as many soldiers at home as possible to fight invading forces. Brown challenged Confederate impressment of animals, goods, and slaves. Several other governors followed his lead. During the war, Georgia sent nearly 100,000 men to battle for the Confederacy, mostly to the Virginian armies. Despite secession, many southerners in North Georgia remained loyal to the Union.

=== Unionism ===
Approximately 5,000 Georgians served in the U.S. Army in units such as the 1st Georgia Infantry Battalion, the 1st Alabama Cavalry Regiment, and a number of East Tennessean regiments. However, Georgia sent fewer volunteers to the Union Army than all other Confederate states except for South Carolina.

Georgia's Rabun County in particular, which did not declare secession from the Union, was highly Unionist, described by some as being "almost a unit against secession." One of the county's residents recalled in 1865 that "You cannot find a people who were more averse to secession than were the people of our county", stating that "I canvassed the county in 1860–61 myself and I know that there were not exceeding twenty men in this county who were in favor of secession."

The dividing lines were often not as clear as they are sometimes viewed in Rabun county during this period. In A Separate Civil War: Communities in Conflict in the Mountain South, Jonathan Dean Sarris examines the wartime experiences of Fannin and Lumpkin counties. Within these two counties, Unionist and Confederate leaning factions fought brutally directly within the home front between 1861 and 1865. Sarris argues that there is a "complex web of local, regional, and national loyalties that connected pre-industrial mountain societies" and that these loyalties are among the major factors that determine the leanings of these mountain towns. The Madden Branch Massacre in Fannin county was one of several atrocities that occurred as the mountain counties divided into pro and anti-Confederate factions. On November 29, 1864, six Georgians trying to enlist in the U.S. Army - Thomas Bell, Harvey Brewster, James T. Hughes, James B. Nelson, Elijah Robinson, and Samuel Lovell - were executed by the notorious Confederate guerilla John P. Gatewood, "the long-haired, red-bearded beast from Georgia" - but, Peter Parris, and Wyatt J. Parton escaped the execution.

While concentrated in the mountains and large cities, Unionism in Georgia was not confined to those areas and could be found in areas across the state.

=== Food shortages ===
By summer 1861, the Union naval blockade virtually shut down the export of cotton and the import of manufactured items. Food that normally came by rail from the Northern states were halted. The governor and legislature pleaded with planters to grow less cotton and more food. The planters refused because at first, they thought the Union would not or could not fight. The planters then saw cotton prices in Europe soared and they expected Europe to soon intervene and break the blockade. The legislature imposed cotton quotas and made it a crime to grow an excess, but the food shortages continued to worsen, especially in the towns. In more than a dozen instances across the state, poor white women raided stores and captured supply wagons to get such necessities as bacon, corn, flour, and cotton yarn.

In some cases, Confederate armies forcibly seized food from Georgians and South Carolinians. The Georgian governor lamented that such seizures of food "have been ruinous to the people of the northeastern part of the State."

As conditions at home worsened late in the war more and more soldiers deserted the army to attend to their suffering farms and families.

=== Deserter and layout gangs ===
During the course of the war, some Georgians banded together to resist Confederate authorities. Some were Unionists in their beliefs, but others were anti-Confederate due to Confederate government's policy of impressment and conscription. Deserter gangs were made up of those who had deserted from Confederate forces. Layout gangs consisted of those who had avoided conscription by hiding out. Pro-Confederate Georgians often derided these groups as Tories. Some groups consisted of both deserters and draft evaders. The mountains of north Georgia were one location where many such groups operated. Others operated in the swamps of the Alapaha River in Berrien, Coffee, Echols County, Georgia, and Irwin counties. The Okefenokee Swamp was another location that several anti-Confederate forces occupied during the course of the war. Black Jack Island and Soldiers Camp Island are two locations within the swamp where over 1,000 deserters were reported to have hidden. By 1864, the Wiregrass Region of Georgia was no longer fully controlled by the Confederate government due to layout and deserter gangs.

During the same time, the backcountry of Pulaski, Montgomery, and Telfair counties in the area of Gum Swamp Creek in modern-day Dodge County had become home to similar groups.

=== Debate over the use of slaves as soldiers ===
Late in the war, when it was suggested that the Confederacy use its slaves as soldiers, many Confederate newspapers, such as the Atlanta Southern Confederacy in Macon, vehemently objected to the idea of armed black men in the Confederate army, saying that it was incongruous with the Confederacy's goals and views regarding African Americans and slavery. The newspaper said that using black men as soldiers would be an embarrassment to Confederates and their children, saying that although African Americans should be used for slave labor, they should not be used as armed soldiers, opining that:

Such an act on our part, would be a stigma on the imperishable pages of history, of which all future generations of Southrons would be ashamed. These are some of the additional considerations which have suggested themselves to us. Let us put the negro to work, but not to fight.

— Atlanta Southern Confederacy, (January 20, 1865), Macon, Georgia.

Georgian Confederates such as Democrat Howell Cobb supported the Macon newspaper's view, saying that the Confederates using black soldiers was "suicidal" and would run contrary to the Confederacy's ideology. Opposing such a move, Cobb stated that African Americans were untrustworthy and innately lacked the qualities to make good soldiers, and that using them would cause many Confederates to quit the army:

The proposition to make soldiers of our slaves is the most pernicious idea that has been suggested since the war began. It is to me a source of deep mortification ... You cannot make soldiers of slaves, nor slaves of soldiers. The moment you resort to negro soldiers your white soldiers will be lost to you; and one secret of the favor with which the proposition is received in portions of the army is the hope that when negroes go into the Army they will be permitted to retire ... [Y]ou can't trust negroes ... [D]on't arm them ... If slaves make good soldiers our whole theory of slavery is wrong ... [T]hey are wanting in every qualification of a soldier.

— Howell Cobb, letter to James A. Seddon (January 1865).

Despite these protests, a law to raise troops from the slave population was passed by the Confederate Congress on March 13, 1865. By mid-April, a few recruiting stations had been established in Macon, Georgia, but the results of these efforts are unknown.

== Battles in Georgia ==
Georgia was relatively free from warfare until late 1863. A total of nearly 550 battles and skirmishes occurred within the state, with the majority occurring in the last two years of the conflict. The first major battle in Georgia was a Confederate victory at the Battle of Chickamauga in 1863, which was the last major Confederate victory in the west. In 1864 Union general William T. Sherman's armies invaded Georgia as part of the Atlanta campaign. Confederate general Joseph E. Johnston fought a series of battles, the largest being the Battle of Kennesaw Mountain, trying to delay Union armies for as long as possible as he retreated toward Atlanta. Johnston's replacement, Gen. John Bell Hood, attempted several unsuccessful counterattacks at the Battle of Peachtree Creek and the Battle of Atlanta, but Sherman captured Atlanta on September 2, 1864.

=== List of battles fought in Georgia ===
- Battle of Adairsville
- Battle of Allatoona
- Battle of Atlanta
- Battle of Brown's Mill
- Battle of Buck Head Creek
- Battle of Chickamauga
- Battle of Columbus
- Battle of Dallas
- Battle of Dalton I
- Battle of Dalton II
- Battle of Davis' Cross Roads
- Battle of Ezra Church
- Battle of Fort McAllister (1863)
- Battle of Fort McAllister (1864)
- Battle of Fort Pulaski
- Battle of Griswoldville
- Battle of Jonesborough
- Battle of Kennesaw Mountain
- Battle of Kolb's Farm
- Battle of Lovejoy's Station
- Battle of Marietta
- Battle of New Hope Church
- Battle of Peachtree Creek
- Battle of Pickett's Mill
- Battle of Resaca
- Battle of Ringgold Gap
- Battle of Rocky Face Ridge
- Battle of the Narrows
- Battle of Utoy Creek
- Battle of Waynesboro

== The Atlanta Campaign ==
Union Maj. Gen. William T. Sherman invaded Georgia from the vicinity of Chattanooga, Tennessee, beginning in May 1864, opposed by the Confederate general Joseph E. Johnston. Johnston's Army of Tennessee withdrew toward Atlanta in the face of successive flanking maneuvers by Sherman's group of armies. In July, Confederate president Jefferson Davis replaced Johnston with the more aggressive John Bell Hood, who began challenging the Union Army in a series of damaging frontal assaults. Hood's army was eventually besieged in Atlanta and the city fell on September 2, setting the stage for Sherman's March to the Sea and hastening the end of the war.

== Sherman's March to the Sea ==
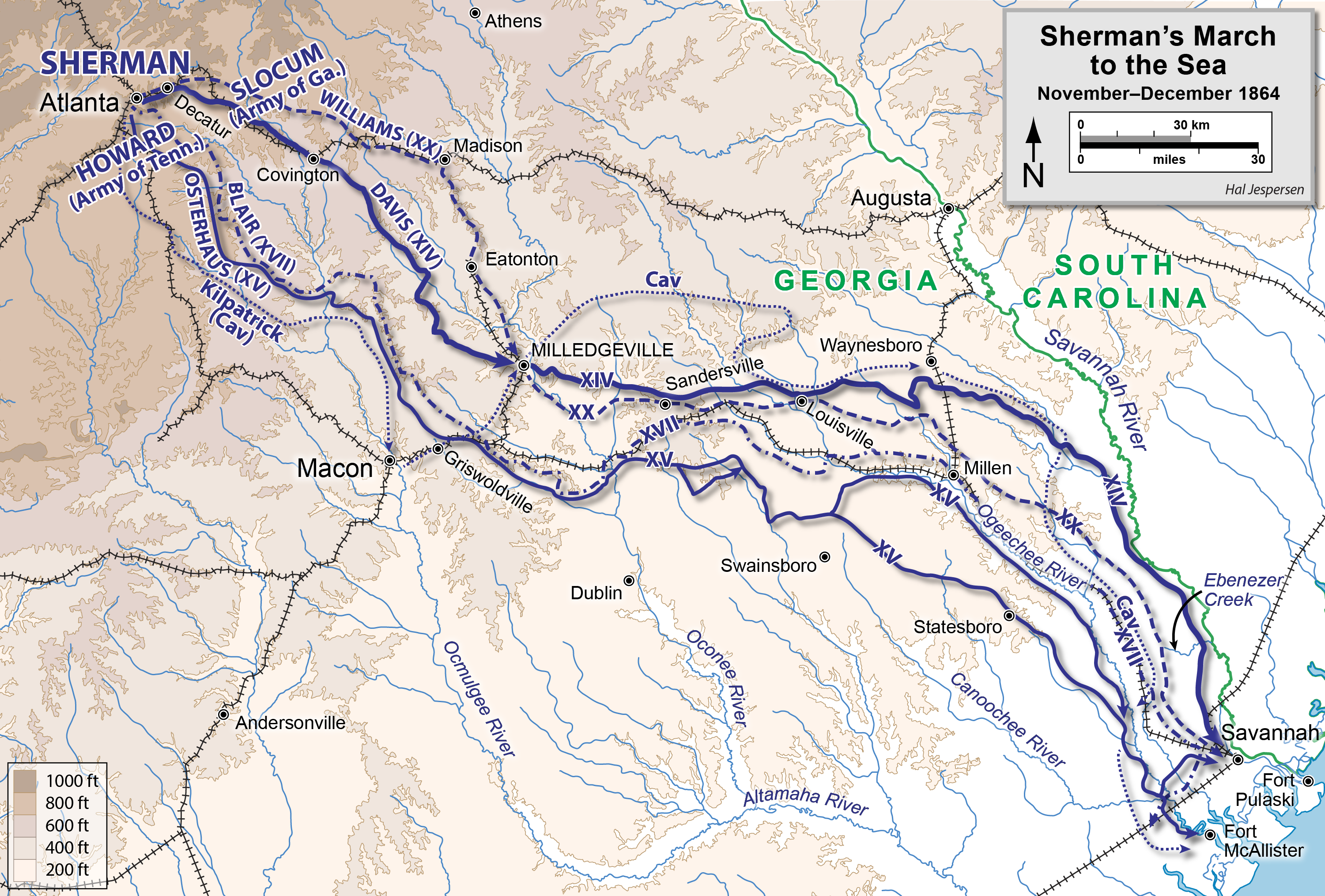
A map showing Sherman's March to the Sea from November to December 1864.

In November 1864, Sherman stripped his army of non-essentials, burned the city of Atlanta, and left it to the Confederates. He began his famous Sherman's March to the Sea, living off the land then burning plantations, wrecking railroads, killing livestock, and freeing slaves. Thousands of escaped slaves followed him as he entered Savannah on December 22. After the loss of Atlanta, the governor withdrew the state's militia from the Confederate forces to harvest crops for the state and the army. The militia did not try to stop Sherman.

Sherman's March was devastating to both Georgia and the Confederacy in terms of economics and psychology. Sherman himself estimated that the campaign had inflicted $100 million (about $1.4 billion in 2012 dollars) in damages, about one fifth of which "inured to our advantage" while the "remainder is simple waste and destruction." His army wrecked 300 miles (480 km) of railroad and numerous bridges and miles of telegraph lines. It seized 5,000 horses, 4,000 mules, and 13,000 head of cattle. It confiscated 9.5 million pounds of corn and 10.5 million pounds of fodder, and destroyed uncounted cotton gins and mills.

Sherman's campaign of total war extended to Georgian civilians. In July 1864, during the Atlanta campaign, Sherman ordered approximately 400 Roswell mill workers, mostly women, arrested as traitors and shipped as prisoners to the North with their children. There is little evidence that more than a few of the women ever returned home.

The memory of Sherman's March became iconic and central to the "Myth of the Lost Cause" and neo-Confederates. The crisis was the setting for Margaret Mitchell's 1936 novel Gone with the Wind and the subsequent 1939 film. Most important were many "salvation stories" that tell not what Sherman's army destroyed, but what was saved by the quick thinking and crafty women on the home front, or by a Union soldier's appreciation of the beauty of homes and the charm of Southern women.

== County courthouses destroyed ==
During the war, twelve county courthouses were destroyed by the U.S. Army.

- The courthouse of McIntosh County at Darien was destroyed in June 1863 when the U.S. Army burned most of the town.
- The Dade County courthouse was destroyed in 1863 during the Chattanooga campaign.
- The courthouses of Cherokee County, Clayton County, Cobb County, Polk County, and Whitfield County were destroyed in 1864 during the Atlanta campaign.
- The courthouses of Bulloch County, Butts County, Screven County, Washington County, and Wilkinson County were destroyed during Sherman's March to the Sea in 1864.

The courthouse in Catoosa County at Ringgold was spared by U.S. General William T. Sherman when he learned it was also a Masonic lodge.

== Last battles ==
In December 1864, Sherman captured Savannah before leaving Georgia in January 1865 to begin his Carolinas campaign. However, there were still several small fights in Georgia after his departure. On April 16, 1865, the Battle of Columbus, was fought on the Georgia-Alabama border. In 1935, the state legislature officially declared this engagement as the "last battle of the War Between the States."

== Re-entry to the Union ==
Following the end of the Civil War, Georgia was part of the Third Military District.

The war left most of Georgia devastated, with many dead and wounded, and the state's economy in shambles. The slaves were emancipated in 1865, and Reconstruction started immediately after the hostilities ceased. Georgia did not re-enter the Union until July 15, 1870, as the last of the former Confederate states to be re-admitted.

The state remained poor well into the twentieth century.

== Civil War sites in Georgia ==
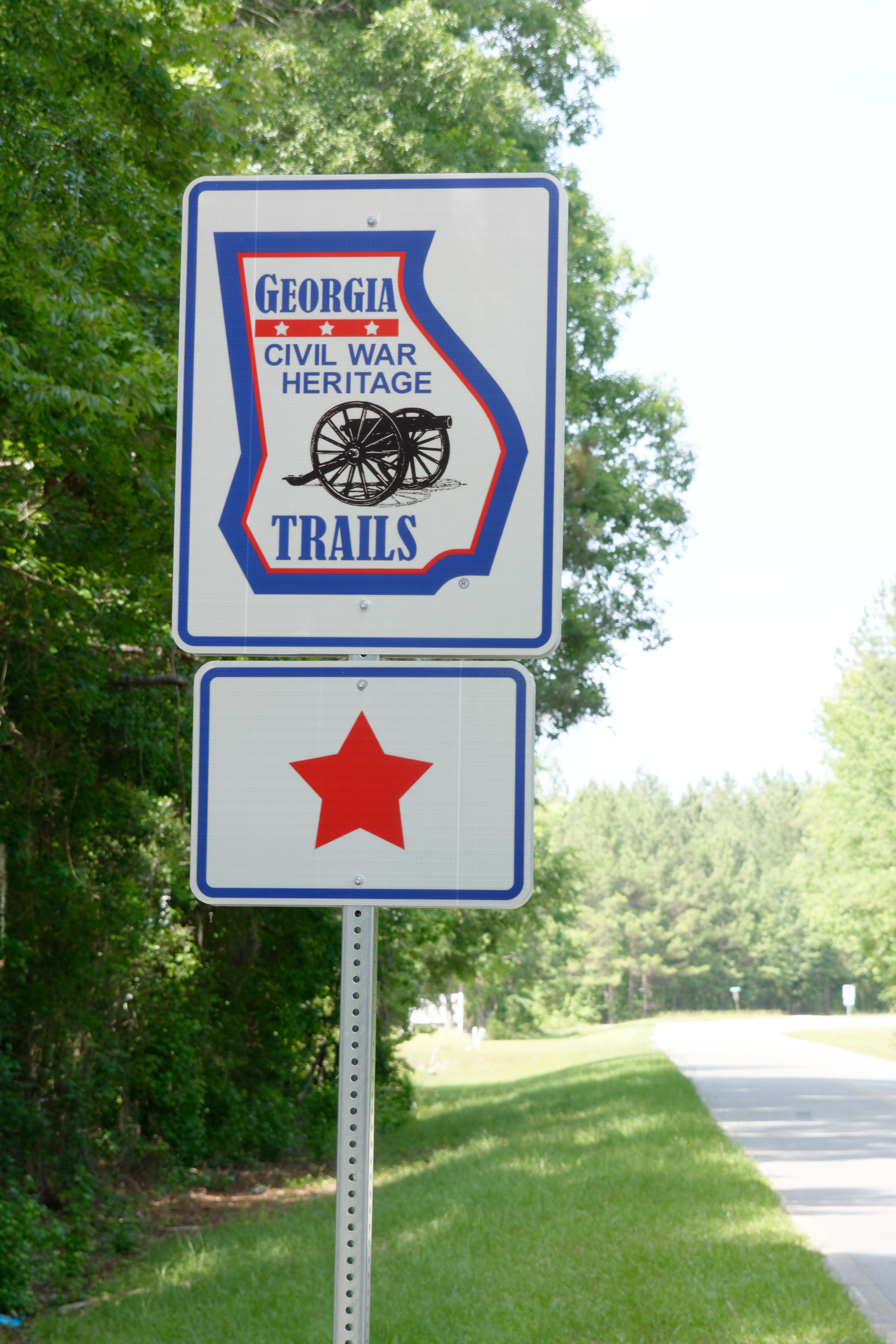
Trails sign

Many of Georgia's Civil War battlefields, particularly those around Atlanta, have been lost to modern urban development. However, a number of sites have been well preserved, including Chickamauga and Chattanooga National Military Park and Kennesaw Mountain National Battlefield Park. Other sites related to the Civil War include Stone Mountain, Fort Pulaski, and the Atlanta Cyclorama.

A number of antebellum mansions and plantations in Georgia are preserved and open to the public, particularly around Atlanta and Savannah. Portions of the Civil War-era Western & Atlantic Railroad have historical markers commemorating events during the war, including several sites associated with the Andrews Raid. The Civil War Heartland Leaders Trail includes 46 sites from Gainesville to Millegeville. Another area near Atlanta with Civil War history is in the Sweetwater Creek State Park in Douglas County, Georgia. At this location is one of the last standing buildings burned by General Sherman's army, New Manchester Mill.

== See also ==
- List of Georgia Confederate Civil War regiments
- List of Georgia Union Civil War units
- History of slavery in Georgia

== Notes ==
=== Citations ===
Preceded by Alabama	List of C.S. states by date of admission to the Confederacy; Ratified Constitution on March 16, 1861 (2nd)	Succeeded by Louisiana
