= Jeremiah Boswell =

American basketball player

Orlando Magic
- Title: Assistant coach Head of player development
- League: NBA

Personal information
- Born: October 6, 1982 (age 44) Salisbury, North Carolina
- Listed height: 6 ft 5 in (1.96 m)

Career information
- High school: Pickens (Jasper, Georgia)
- College: Columbia (2001–2005)
- NBA draft: 2005: undrafted
- Playing career: 2005–2012
- Position: Guard

Career history

Playing
- 2006–2007: AD Guaruja
- 2007–2009: BC Sliven
- 2009: MGS Grand-Saconnex
- 2010: Hong Kong
- 2010–2011: ABA Strumica
- 2011–2012: KK Torus

Coaching
- 2024–present: Orlando Magic (assistant)

Jeremiah Boswell (born October 6, 1982) is a former American professional basketball player from Jasper, Georgia, currently working as an assistant coach and head of player development for the Orlando Magic of the National Basketball Association (NBA).

Boswell was an All-State player in Georgia at Pickens County High School and continued his career by playing in New York City at Columbia University. His professional playing career had stops in Brazil, Bulgaria, Switzerland, Hong Kong and North Macedonia. He has previously also worked in China and India as a consultant for the NBA office, and is regarded as one of the best player-development minds in the game.

== Notes ==
- http://www.city-data.com/city/Jasper-Georgia.html
- sportsillustrated.cnn.com
- http://www.eurobasket.com/player.asp?Cntry=MKD&PlayerID=39892
- http://www.nba.com/global/asia/fitcamp_china_080731.html
- https://www.nytimes.com/2005/02/12/sports/ncaabasketball/firstplace-penn-tops-columbia.html
