= Talking Rock, Georgia =

- Town
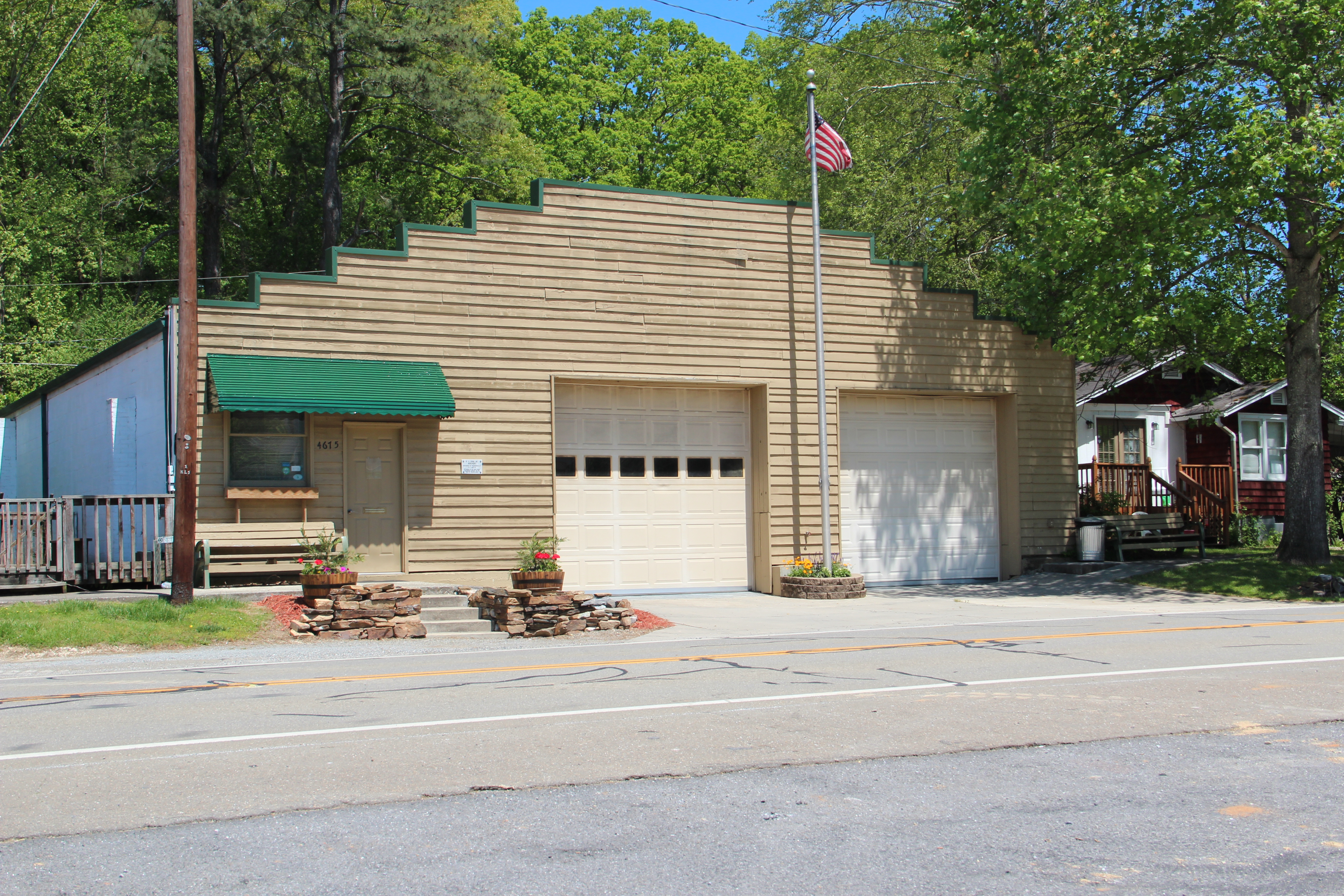
- Town hall

- Location in Pickens County and the state of Georgia
- Coordinates: 34°30′34″N 84°30′19″W
- Country: United States
- State: Georgia
- County: Pickens

Government
  - Mayor: James Bryant Jr.
  - Talking Rock Town Council: Members: Lynda Cagle; Caleb Gay; Tony Hawf; Jason Little
  - City Manager: Amanda Buntin

Area
  - Total: 2.09 sq mi (5.41 km^{2})
  - Land: 2.06 sq mi (5.34 km^{2})
  - Water: 0.023 sq mi (0.06 km^{2})
- Elevation: 1,093 ft (333 m)

Population (2020)
  - Total: 91
  - Density: 44.1/sq mi (17.03/km^{2})
- Time zone: UTC-5 (Eastern (EST))
  - Summer (DST): UTC-4 (EDT)
- ZIP code: 30175
- Area code: 706
- FIPS code: 13-75272
- GNIS feature ID: 0356579
- Website: talkingrockga.com

Talking Rock is a town in Pickens County, Georgia, United States. The population as of the 2020 census was 91.

== History ==
Talking Rock had its start in the early 1880s when the railroad was extended to that point. The community takes its name from nearby Talking Rock Creek. The Georgia General Assembly incorporated Talking Rock as a town in 1883.

== Geography ==
Talking Rock is located at 34°30′34″N 84°30′19″W (34.509557, -84.505175).

Georgia State Route 136 is the main route through the town, and leads east 30 mi (48 km) to Georgia State Route 9 north of Dawsonville, and west 31 mi (50 km) to Resaca along Interstate 75. Georgia State Routes 5 and 515 (Zell Miller Mountain Parkway) pass to the west of the town as a four-lane highway, leading north 15 mi (24 km) to Ellijay and southeast 6 mi (10 km) to Jasper, the Pickens County seat. Atlanta is 66 mi (106 km) south via GA-5/515 to Interstate 575 and Interstate 75.

According to the United States Census Bureau, the town has a total area of 1.49 square miles (3.9 km^{2}), all of it land.

== Demographics ==
Historical population
Census	Pop.	Note	%±
1890	141		—
1900	102		−27.7%
1910	108		5.9%
1920	95		−12.0%
1930	110		15.8%
1940	103		−6.4%
1950	94		−8.7%
1960	84		−10.6%
1970	76		−9.5%
1980	72		−5.3%
1990	62		−13.9%
2000	49		−21.0%
2010	64		30.6%
2020	91		42.2%
U.S. Decennial Census

At the 2000 census, there were 49 people, 19 households and 14 families residing in the town. The population density was 255.5 inhabitants per square mile (98.6/km^{2}). There were 23 housing units at an average density of 119.9 per square mile (46.3/km^{2}). The racial makeup of the town was 100.00% White. By the 2020 census, there were 91 people residing in the town.

== Education ==
All areas of Pickens County are in the Pickens County School District. All residents of that district are zoned to Jasper Middle School, Pickens Junior High School, and Pickens High School.

== Notable people ==
Chandler Smith (born 2002), professional racing driver
