= Vetrazzo =

Vetrazzo is a company based in Tate, Georgia, United States.

This patented process takes industrial waste in large quantities and transforms it into sturdy 9' by 5' polished slabs.

== History ==
Vetrazzo recycled glass countertops were invented in Berkeley in 1996. A materials scientist, Don McPherson, pursuing his PhD combined recycled glass and a cement binder to create a sustainable, polished countertop. The company at that time was known as Counter Productions. The production batches were small and handmade, demanding a more streamlined and repeatable process.

In 2006, a former customer and designer named Olivia Teter was looking for a new project and found the company in financial straits. She, together with James Sheppard and Jeff Gustafson, partnered to raise capital, buy the product formula and assets behind the Vetrazzo countertops, and co-found what is now Vetrazzo LLC.

The Vetrazzo manufacturing facility was located in Richmond, California in a recycled Ford assembly plant. The plant is on the National Register of Historic Places and hosts the Rosie the Riveter Museum. It utilizes daylight, controls air pollution with a special negative-pressure dust booth, recycles water and hosts a 1 megawatt solar system manufactured by building tenant Sunpower Corporation.

In June 2010 Polycor acquired Vetrazzo and move the plant back Georgia where it now shares a manufacturing space with the Georgia Marble company.

== Environmental record ==
Vetrazzo claims on their website that their countertops consist of recycled glass and a cement binder. The glass is said to have been sourced from a curbside recycling program, windows, windshields, laboratory glass, stained glass and traffic lights. Vetrazzo's website also claims that their countertops are recyclable at the end of their useful lives.

The company states that they are proud of their sustainable work, being a member of the United States Green Building Council, a certified B corporation, a certified Bay Area Green Business and a member of the Green Chamber of Commerce.

Vetrazzo's website also claims that they are committed to providing green jobs to the low-income neighborhood surrounding their offices and plant. All employees, including factory workers, are said to be provided with health care and full benefits. All Vetrazzo slabs are manufactured in the United States.

== Awards and recognition ==
Vetrazzo was awarded a significant grant from the California Department of Conservation in 2006 and 2008 as part of a program to expand markets for recycled beverage containers. Vetrazzo is also an Environmental Protection Agency Award Winner.
