= Pickens High School (Georgia) =

High school in Georgia, United States

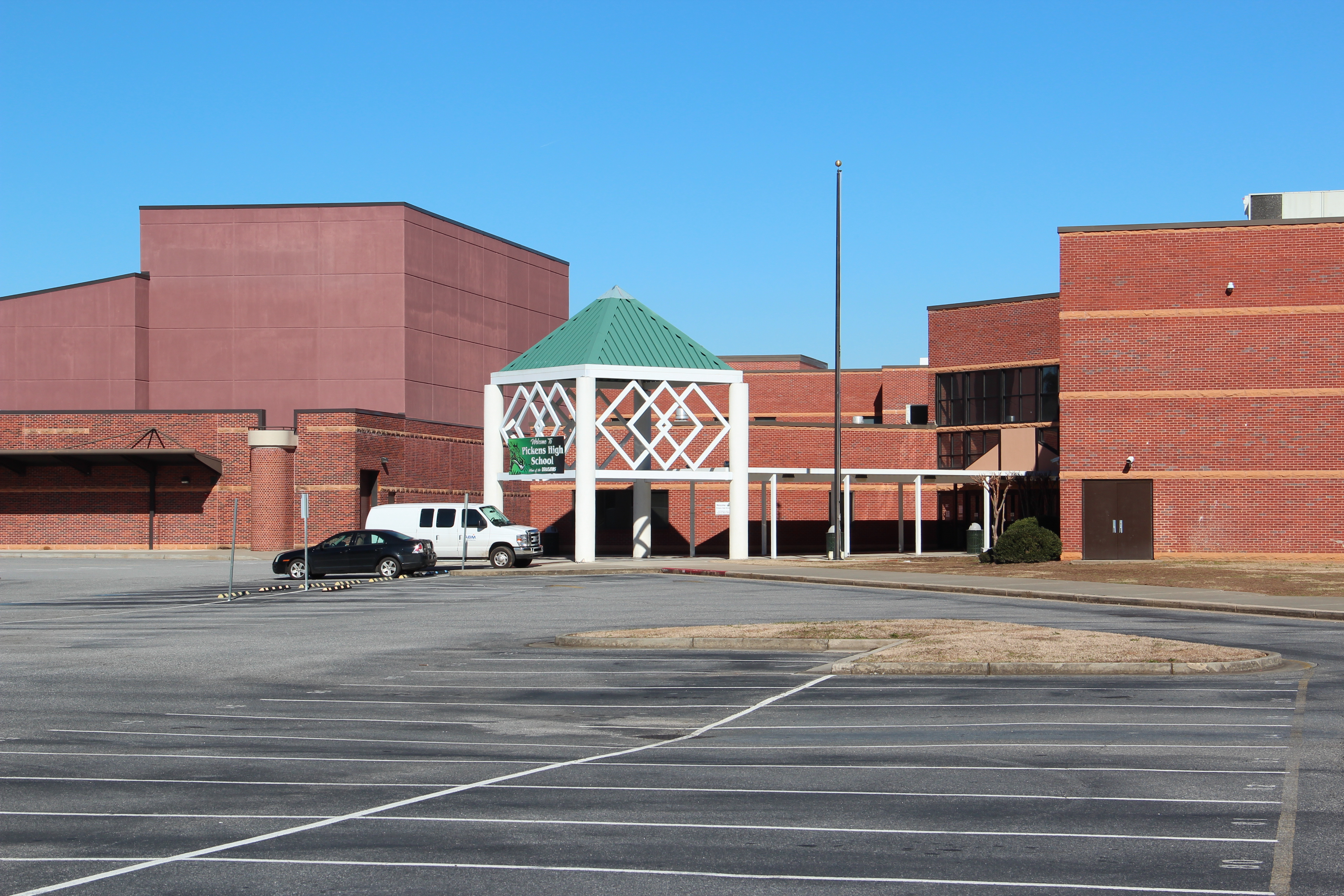
- Pickens High School

Location
- 500 Dragon Drive; Jasper, Pickens County, Georgia 30143; United States; 34.4493°N 84.3977°W

Information
- Type: Public high school
- School district: Pickens County School District
- Principal: Dr. Brandon Tippens
- Teaching staff: 85.60 (on an FTE basis)
- Grades: 9–12
- Enrollment: 1,269 (2023–2024)
- Student to teacher ratio: 14.82
- Colors: Green and White
- Athletics conference: GHSA 7AAA
- Mascot: Dragon
- Team name: Dragons
- Website: http://pickenshigh.pickens.k12.ga.us/

Pickens High School is a public high school in unincorporated Pickens County, Georgia, United States, with a Jasper post office address.

It is a part of the Pickens County School District, which includes the communities of Jasper, Talking Rock, Tate, and the Pickens County portion of Nelson.

The school serves grades 9–12.

== Notable alumni ==
- Jeremiah Boswell (2001), assistant coach for the Orlando Magic, played basketball overseas
- Chandler Smith (2020), NASCAR driver
