= Pickens County School District =

Pickens County School District may refer to:

- Pickens County School District (Alabama)
- Pickens County School District (Georgia)
- School District of Pickens County (South Carolina)
