= Jasper, Georgia =

- City and county seat
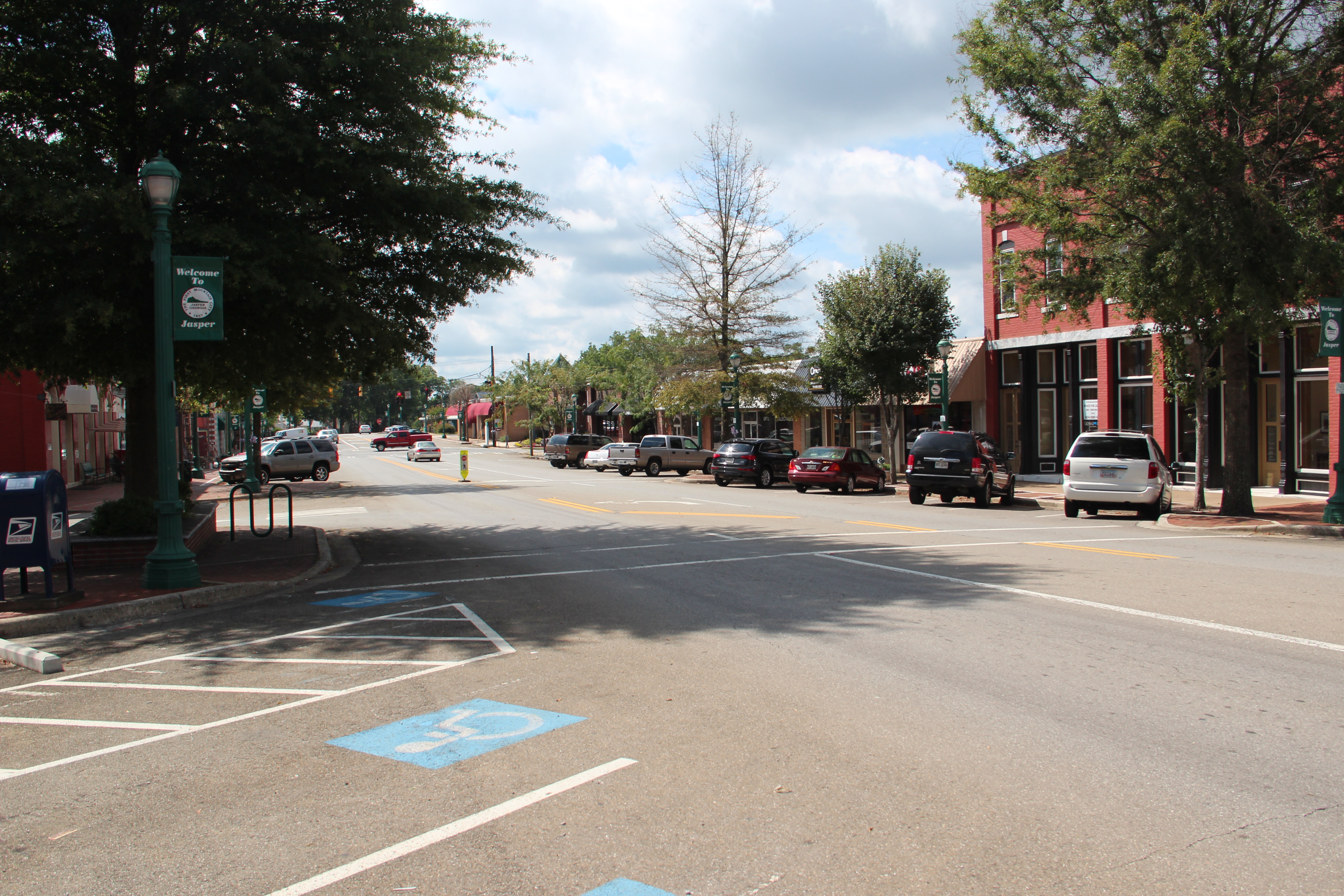
- Downtown Jasper

- Flag Seal

- Location in Pickens County and the state of Georgia
- Coordinates: 34°28′9″N 84°26′3″W
- Country: United States
- State: Georgia
- County: Pickens

Government
  - Mayor: Kirk Raffield
  - City Manager: Jim Looney

Area
  - Total: 8.56 sq mi (22.16 km^{2})
  - Land: 8.56 sq mi (22.16 km^{2})
  - Water: 0 sq mi (0.00 km^{2})
- Elevation: 1,463 ft (446 m)

Population (2020)
  - Total: 4,084
  - Density: 477.3/sq mi (184.28/km^{2})
- Time zone: UTC-5 (Eastern (EST))
  - Summer (DST): UTC-4 (EDT)
- ZIP code: 30143
- Area code: Area code 706/770
- FIPS code: 13-41932
- GNIS feature ID: 0316056
- Website: www.jasper-ga.us

Jasper is a city in Pickens County, Georgia, United States. The population was 4,084 in 2020. The city is the county seat of Pickens County.

== History ==
Jasper was founded in 1853 as seat of the newly formed Pickens County. It was incorporated in 1857 as a town and in 1957 as a city. The community is named for William Jasper, a hero of the American Revolutionary War. Jasper is situated at an elevation of 1,463 feet (446 m).

== Geography ==
Jasper is located at 34°28′9″N 84°26′3″W (34.469127, -84.434039).

Georgia State Route 53 passes through the center of Jasper, while Georgia State Routes 5 and 515 bypass the city to its west. GA-5/515 lead north 21 mi (34 km) to Ellijay and south 60 mi (97 km) to Atlanta, via its connection with Interstate 575, which ends just south of the city. GA-53 runs through the downtown area as an east–west highway, leading east 24 mi (39 km) on a winding and mountainous route to Dawsonville, and west 36 mi (58 km) to Calhoun along Interstate 75.

According to the United States Census Bureau, the city has a total area of 3.3 square miles (8.5 km^{2}), all of it land.

== Demographics ==
Historical population
Census	Pop.	Note	%±
1880	146		—
1890	333		128.1%
1900	379		13.8%
1910	332		−12.4%
1920	386		16.3%
1930	563		45.9%
1940	576		2.3%
1950	1,380		139.6%
1960	1,036		−24.9%
1970	1,202		16.0%
1980	1,556		29.5%
1990	1,772		13.9%
2000	2,167		22.3%
2010	3,684		70.0%
2020	4,084		10.9%
U.S. Decennial Census

=== 2020 census ===
As of the 2020 census, Jasper had a population of 4,084. The median age was 40.3 years. 23.0% of residents were under the age of 18 and 19.2% of residents were 65 years of age or older. For every 100 females there were 84.2 males, and for every 100 females age 18 and over there were 79.9 males age 18 and over.

94.9% of residents lived in urban areas, while 5.1% lived in rural areas.

There were 1,650 households in Jasper, of which 32.7% had children under the age of 18 living in them. Of all households, 40.4% were married-couple households, 16.8% were households with a male householder and no spouse or partner present, and 36.3% were households with a female householder and no spouse or partner present. About 32.1% of all households were made up of individuals and 16.1% had someone living alone who was 65 years of age or older.

There were 1,718 housing units, of which 4.0% were vacant. The homeowner vacancy rate was 1.5% and the rental vacancy rate was 4.1%.

Jasper racial composition as of 2020
Race	Num.	Perc.
White (non-Hispanic)	3,487	85.38%
Black or African American (non-Hispanic)	104	2.55%
Native American	15	0.37%
Asian	39	0.95%
Other/mixed	182	4.46%
Hispanic or Latino	257	6.29%

== Education ==
=== Pickens County School District ===
The Pickens County School District holds pre-school to grade 12, and consists of four elementary schools, two middle schools, and a high school. The district has 248 full-time teachers and roughly 4,400 students.

- Harmony Elementary School
- Hill City Elementary School
- Tate Elementary School
- Jasper Middle School
- Pickens Jr High School
- Pickens High School

=== Higher education ===
- Chattahoochee Technical College - Appalachian Campus

== Points of interest ==
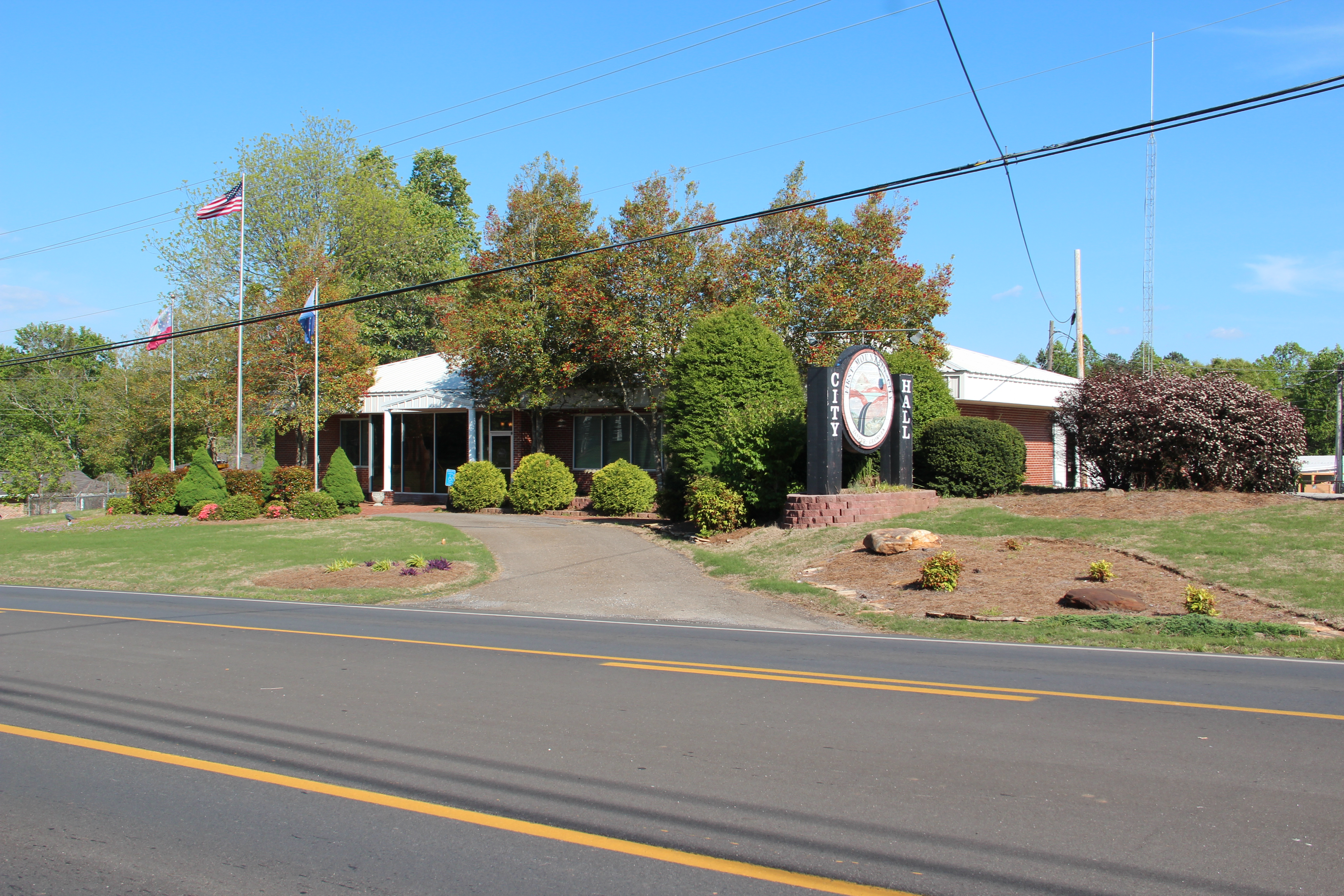
Jasper City Hall

Nicknamed "The First Mountain City," Jasper is located 50 miles north of Atlanta.

The Tate House was built by local marble baron Sam Tate in the 1920s and now sits adjacent to Tate Elementary and is on the National Register of Historic Places. Standing on an old Cherokee place of worship, the historic Woodbridge Inn is a restaurant and inn.

Jasper is located near several large acreage mountain neighborhoods such as Big Canoe, Bent Tree, and the Preserve at Sharp Mountain.

== Events ==
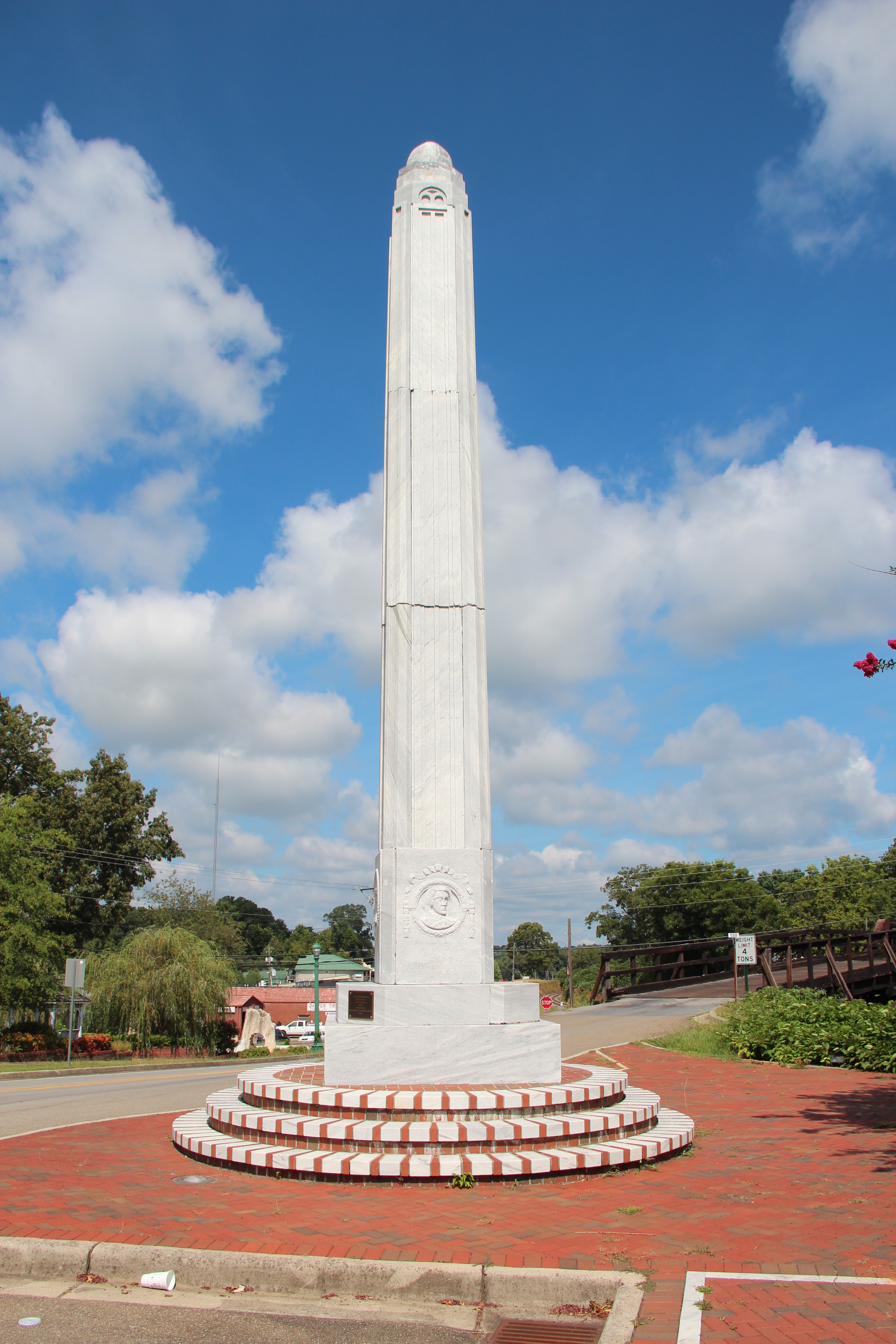
The city's Oglethorpe Monument (Recently temporarily dismantled due to repairs from a lightning strike)

The Georgia Marble Festival is held on the first weekend in October every year. It is sponsored by the Pickens County Chamber of Commerce, and held at Lee Newton Park.

The festivities start with the Marble Festival Road Race. There are booths with local vendors selling handmade crafts, among other things. Another highlight is the art show, with exhibits of carved marble, as well as paintings, photographs, and pottery.

The Apple Festival is held the following two weekends in nearby Ellijay, Gilmer County.

== Notable people ==
- Jeremiah Boswell - basketball player
- James Larry Edmondson - judge
- Weldon Henley (1880–1960) - MLB pitcher
- Chandler Smith - NASCAR driver
