= 1st Georgia Infantry Battalion =

- Active: October 31, 1864 – July 19, 1865
- Disbanded: July 19, 1865
- Country: United States
- Allegiance: Union
- Branch: United States Army; Union Army
- Type: Infantry
- Size: Battalion
- Part of: 1st Brigade, 2nd Separate Division, District of the Etowah, Department of the Cumberland
- Engagements: American Civil War

The 1st Battalion of Georgia Infantry was an infantry battalion that served in the Union Army during the American Civil War, despite being organized from a state that had seceded from the Union.

== History ==
In late 1864, the Federal armies under William T. Sherman had captured Atlanta and were marching towards the Atlantic Ocean and the port city of Savannah. At the end of October, efforts were made to recruit loyal men to join the Federal army for duty in the rear lines to free up veterans for front-line combat duty. A number of men from Dawson County enlisted in two companies, and others from Pickens County joined Company B. Some of these enlistees were ex-POWs from Atlanta who had served in the Confederate States Army, but had since sworn allegiance to the Federal government. The battalion was mustered in at Marietta, Georgia on October 31, 1864. It was assigned as an unattached unit to the Department of the Cumberland, and subsequently guarded the Western & Atlantic Railroad near Dalton, Georgia, until March 1865.

The battalion was then attached to the 1st Brigade, 2nd Separate Division, District of the Etowah, Department of the Cumberland, and guarded the railroads near the Etowah River until mid-July 1865. The battalion was mustered out in Dawson County on July 19, 1865.

== Battalion officers and men ==
- Company A (Union County) – Suffered 6 men killed during its term of service.
- Company B (Dawson County)
- Company C (Dawson County)
- Company D (Pickens County)

== See also ==
- Georgia in the Civil War
