= Currahee Mountain =

Mountain located in Stephens County, Georgia

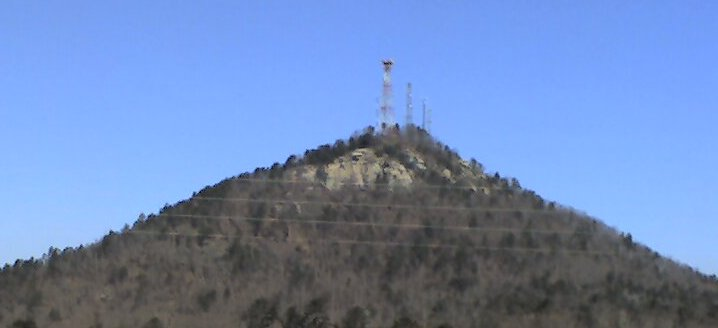
- Currahee Mountain

Highest point
- Elevation: 1,735 ft (529 m) NAVD 88
- Listing: Mountains of Georgia
- Coordinates: 34°31′45″N 83°22′33″W

Geography
- Location within Georgia
- Location: Stephens County, Georgia, U.S.
- Parent range: Blue Ridge Mountains
- Topo map: USGS Ayersville 34083-E

Currahee Mountain is a mountain located in Stephens County, Georgia, near Toccoa. The name appears to be derived from the Cherokee word ᏊᏩᎯ (quu-wa-hi) meaning "stand alone".

== Geography ==
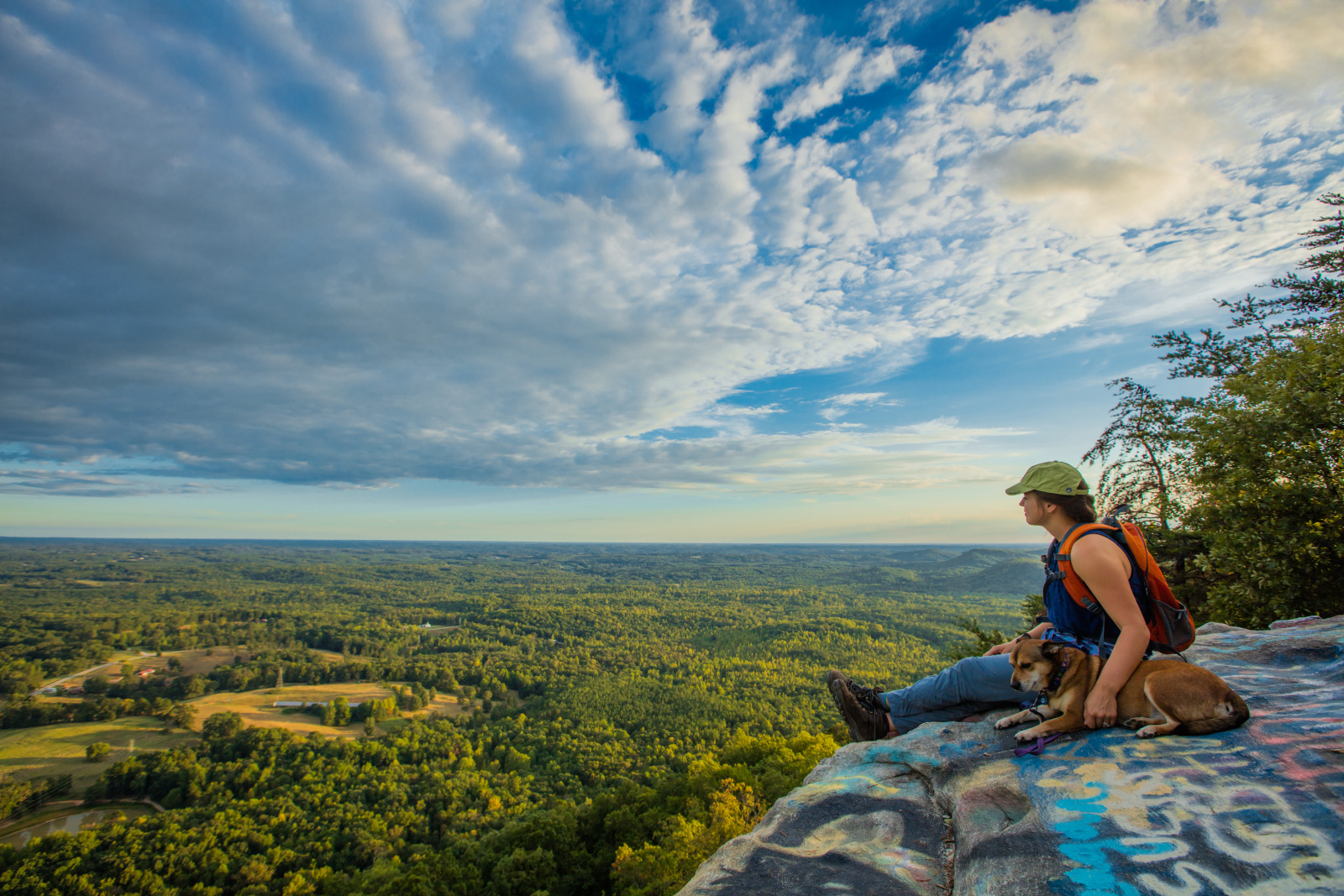
View from Currahee Mountain

Technically a part of the Georgia Piedmont or "foothill" province, Currahee Mountain rises abruptly about 800 vertical feet (240 m) above the local topography and is the highest peak in Stephens County. Part of the mountain is in the Chattahoochee National Forest. On clear days, the peak's 1,735-foot (529 m) summit is visible for many miles and is a prominent landmark to the southeast of Georgia's Blue Ridge Mountain crest.

== History ==
Currahee Mountain is one of the landmarks used in the Treaty of Hopewell. It was also used by Benjamin Hawkins to run the Hawkins Line.

On 12 October 1864, Confederate troops defeated Union troops at the Battle of the Narrows, also called the Battle of Currahee, during the Civil War. Casualties were small and the wounded were cared for by neighbors.

During World War II, Camp Toccoa was established at the base of the mountain to train Army paratroopers from 1942 to 1946. The name of the mountain became a motto for these paratroopers, and inspired the quote: "Three miles up, three miles down." (5 km up, 5 km down).

The mountain is depicted in Tom Hanks' and Steven Spielberg's television miniseries Band of Brothers: paratroopers from E Company, 2-506th Parachute Infantry Regiment run up and down its trail. The scenes depicting Currahee Mountain were filmed in Bourne Wood.

The Colonel Robert F. Sink memorial trail follows Currahee Mountain Road from the former Camp Toccoa to the summit of Currahee Mountain. The start of the trail is marked by a commemorative plaque dedicating the trail to "Col. Bob" Sink from the Five-O-Sinks (506th Parachute Infantry Regiment Association). The trail is currently the venue for the Annual Currahee Challenge, a three-mile (5 km) and six-mile (10 km) race on the mountain that occurs in the fall. The first Saturday of June has a run called the "D-Day Run" held by the Camp Toccoa at Currahee organization.

The mountain is a popular destination for rock climbing and rappelling.

One of the radio towers at the top holds NOAA Weather Radio station WWH24, serving parts of northeast Georgia and upstate South Carolina from NWS Greer.
