= Tate House (Tate, Georgia) =

Historic house in Georgia, United States

- U.S. National Register of Historic Places
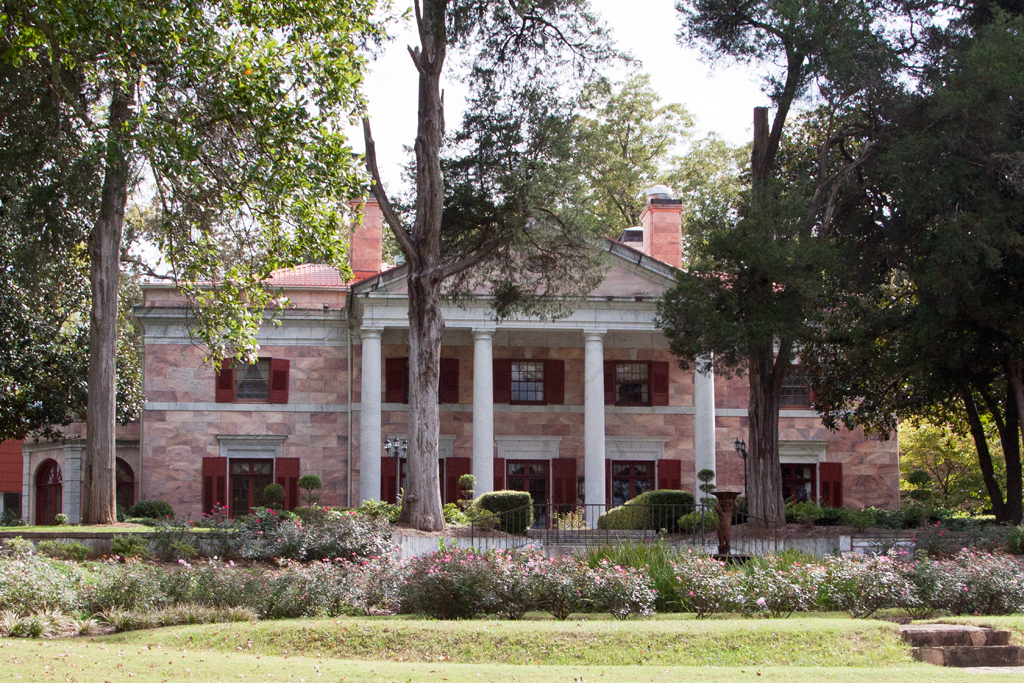

- Location within Georgia Location within the United States
- Location: Tate, Pickens County, Georgia
- Coordinates: 34°24′48″N 84°22′23″W
- Area: 10 acres (4.0 ha)
- Built: 1926
- Architectural style: Neo-Classical
- NRHP reference No.: 74000700
- Added to NRHP: May 17, 1974

The Tate House is a historic property east of Tate, Georgia on Georgia State Route 53. Colonel Samuel Tate began construction in 1921 and the mansion was completed in 1926. Designed by Walker and Weeks, architects in the Neo-Classical style, the home is made of pink and white marble (Etowah Marble) supplied by Tate's Georgia Marble Company, and sometimes called the "Pink Palace" or "Pink Marble Mansion". Tate was president of the marble company.

In 1938 Colonel Sam Tate died and the mansion began to fall into disrepair. The surviving Tates (Luke & Flora) resided in the mansion until 1955 when they left the home unoccupied.

The Tate House is two stories, rectangular, with a hipped roof, two interior chimneys, and a pedimented tetrastyle front entrance portico. At the rear is a slightly projecting pedimented section with a one-story portico. The interior features excellent mural wallpaper and parquet marble floors.

In 1974, Mrs. Ann Shattuck of Bisbee, AZ and her husband at the time, Mr. Columbus J. Southerland, bought the house; it was added to the National Register of Historic Placeson May 17, 1974. Ann & Columbus then divorced and she later married Joseph P. Laird in 1981, who completed some of the restorations himself, including the beautifully built sand filled bar in the pub. The restoration project was completed 10 years after the initial purchase by Ann, and it was opened to the public in 1985.

In January 2001, the estate was purchased by Holbrook Properties, LP. Lois Holbrook and Marsha Mann plan to continue the restoration of the mansion and gardens.

It is a contributing building in the Georgia Marble Company and Tate Historic District.
