= Marblehill, Georgia =

Unincorporated community in Georgia, U.S.

Marble Hill Baptist Church

Marblehill is an unincorporated community in Pickens County, in the U.S. state of Georgia.

== History ==
The community was named for a marble quarry near the town site. The name sometimes is spelled out as "Marble Hill". A post office was established at Marblehill in 1889. The ZIP Code for Marblehill is 30148

Construction was started on the Tate House in 1921 using "Pink Marble" from the surrounding quarries.
