= Georgia Marble Company and Tate Historic District =

Historic district in Georgia, United States

- U.S. National Register of Historic Places
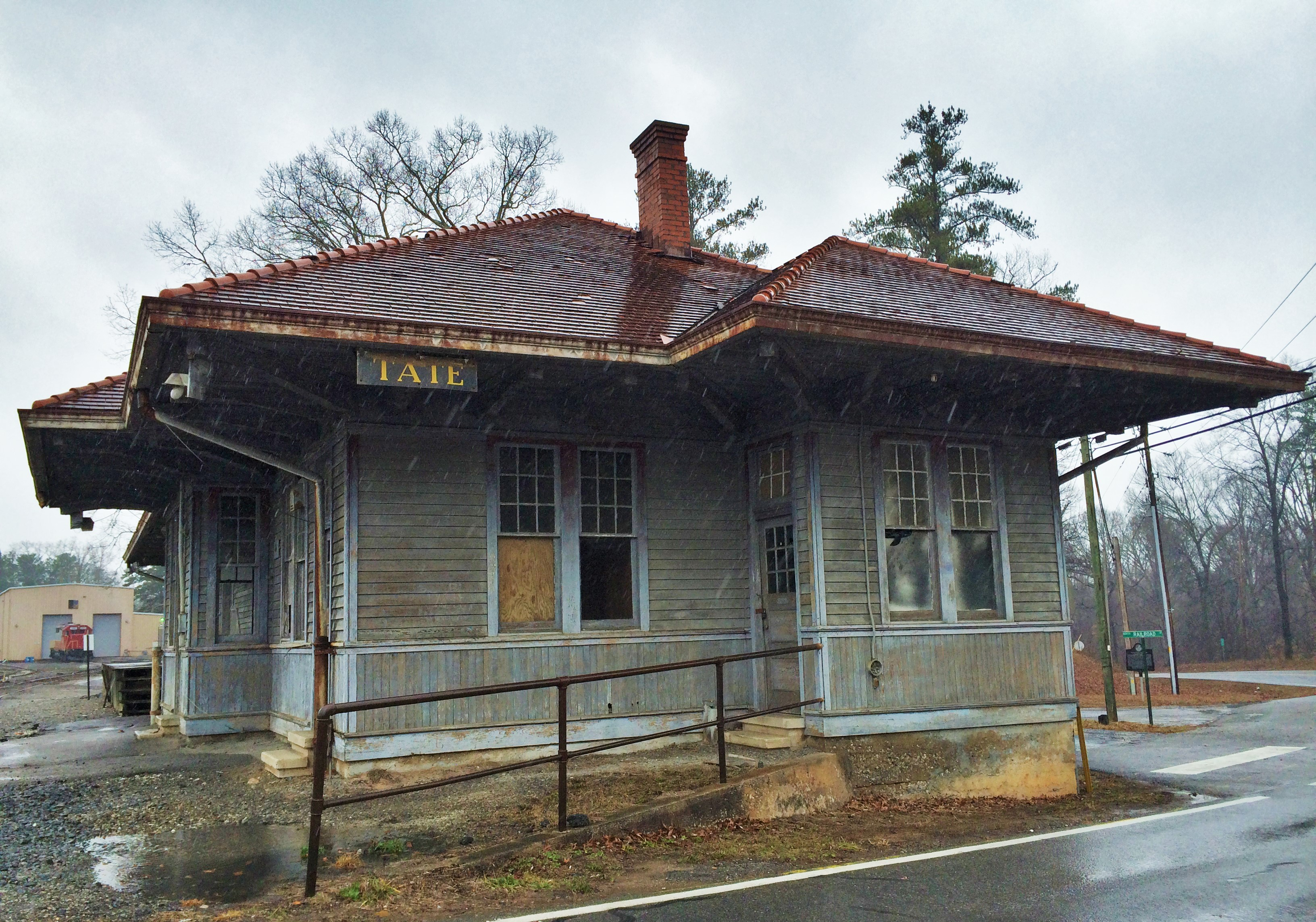

- Location within Georgia Location within the United States
- Location: Centered on GA 53 bet GA 5 and Long Swamp Creek, Tate, Georgia
- Coordinates: 34.411°N 84.384°W
- Area: 550 acres (220 ha)
- Built: 1840
- Designer: J.B. Hill (fountains)
- Architectural style: Late Gothic Revival, Colonial Revival, et al.
- NRHP reference No.: 05000644
- Added to NRHP: June 10, 2005

The Georgia Marble Company and Tate Historic District was listed on the National Register of Historic Places in 2005. The district is centered on Georgia State Route 53 between Georgia State Route 5 and Long Swamp Creek, in or near Tate, Georgia. The main office of the Georgia Marble Company was built in 1884 in Mission Revival style.

It includes the Tate House, which has four 22 feet (6.7 m) columns, and has marble balustrades and fountains designed by Georgia Marble Company designer J. B. Hill. The Tate House was separately listed on the National Register in 1974. The district also includes Late Gothic Revival architecture and Colonial Revival.

It also includes the Tate Gymnasium, which was separately listed on the National Register in 2002.

Also included:

- Tate Depot (built after 1900), on the Louisville and Nashville Railroad line
- Tate Methodist Church (1887), on Georgia Highway 53, a Gothic Revival-style church
- Methodist Episcopal Church South (c.1887), in Smoky Hollow, built to serve African American employees. Later the Miracle Pentecostal Fellowship Church. Later shared by the Marble Valley Friends and the Mt. Calvary Baptist Church.

The district's 550 acres (2.2 km^{2}) include 106 contributing buildings, 15 contributing structures, and seven other contributing sites.
