= Georgia Marble Company =

Marble stone company

The Georgia Marble Company was founded by Samuel Tate in 1884. The company, located in Pickens County, Georgia contained rich mae Tate leased out all the land in Pickens County, Georgia, which contained land rich in marble. The Georgia marble vein stretches 5 to 7 miles in length , 1/2 mile wide, and approximately 2,000 feet in depth . This natural feature has earned Pickens County the title of Georgia’s Marble Capital.

== Company history ==
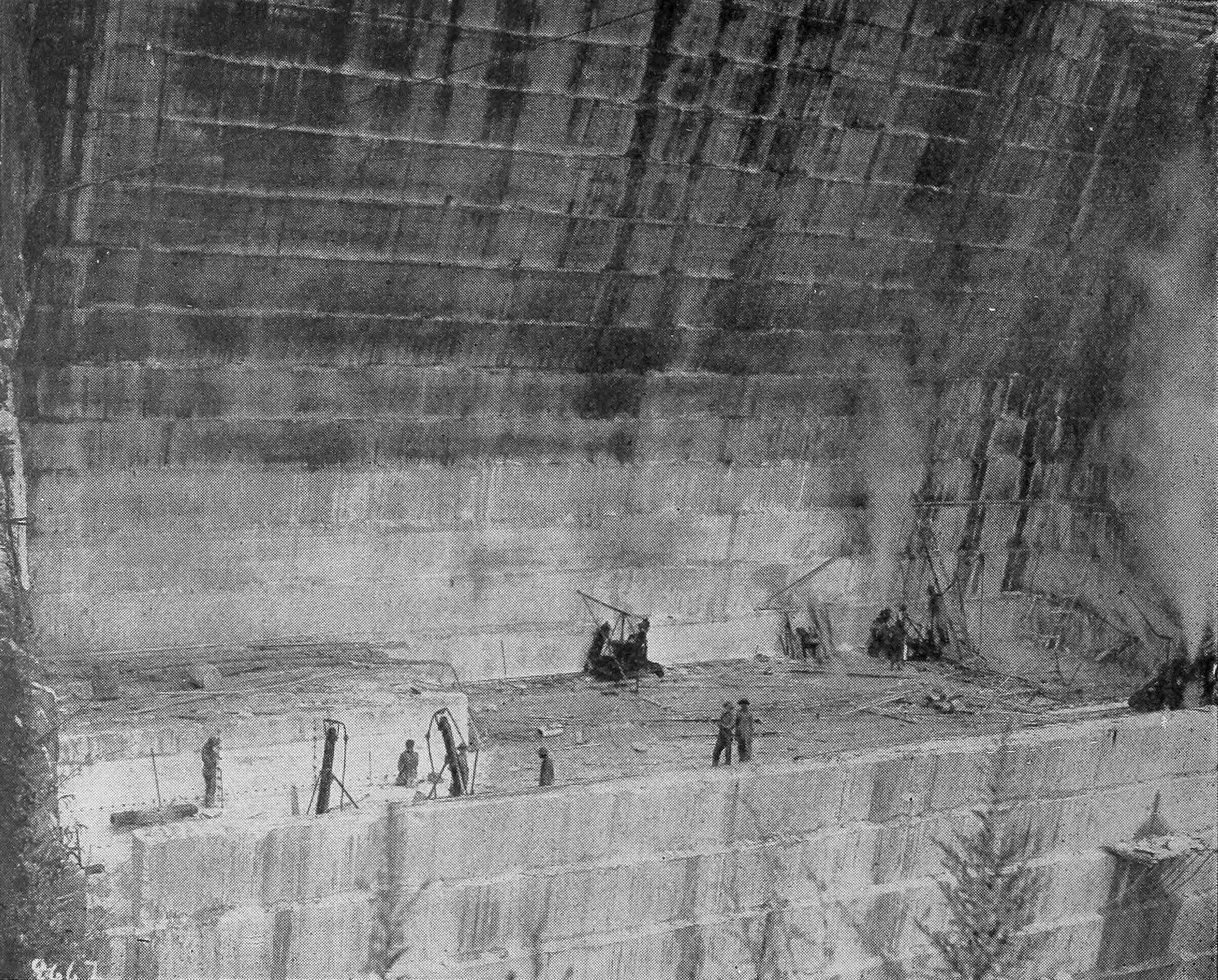
The Georgia Marble Company quarry near Tate, Georgia, 1911

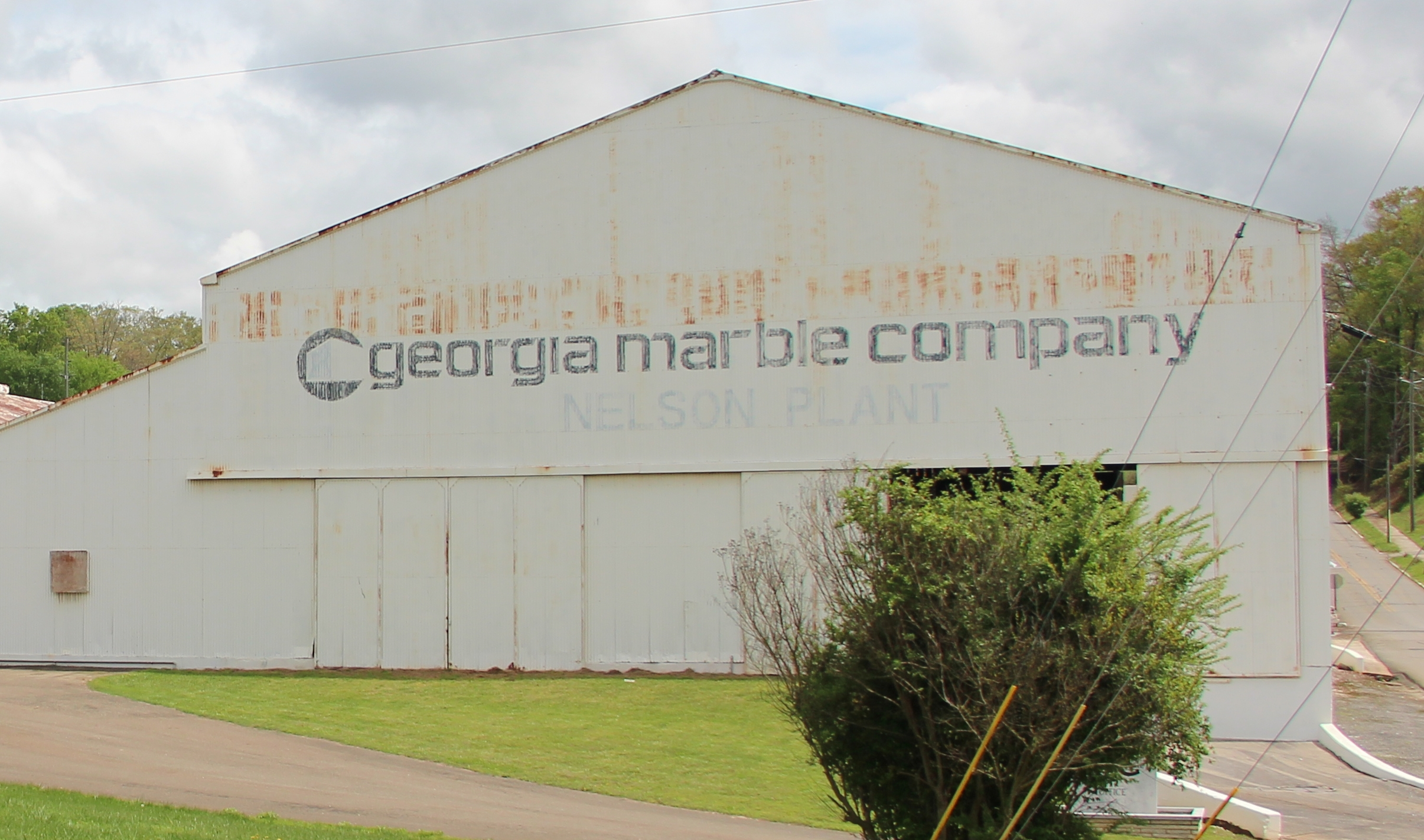
Former Georgia Marble Company plant in Nelson.

In the 1830s Henry Fitzsimmons established the first marble quarry in Pickens County, which was part of the Murphy Marble Belt. In 1884, Samuel Tate founded the Georgia Marble Company, and leased out the land for others to use. In 1905 Colonel Sam Tate partnered with Dawson Mathias Caldwell and the two became co-presidents and general managers of the company. The business grew rapidly, until concrete began to replace marble in buildings. In 1969, with business falling, the company was purchased by Jim Walter Corporation. Over the next few decades it changed hands several times, passing through ownership by Kohlberg Kravis Roberts and Company, Hillsborough Holding Corporation, First Chicago Corporation and IMERYS.

=== Flood ===
On January 7, 1946, the Etowah River in nearby Cherokee County reached a depth of 26.7 feet (8.1 m), and flooded the county including the Georgia Marble Company plant, which was covered with one foot of water.

=== Acquisition ===
In 2003, the dimension stone division of Georgia Marble Company was acquired by Polycor.

=== Notable commissions ===
- Bok Tower Gardens in Lake Wales, Florida, designed by Milton Bennett Medary with the features sculpture by Lee Lawrie.
- New York Stock Exchange annex as the pediment in it was created by John Quincy Adams Ward and carved by the Piccirilli Brothers,
- Daniel Chester French's Abraham Lincoln statue in the Lincoln Memorial in Washington, D.C., carved by the Piccirilli Brothers,
- National Air and Space Museum
- East Wing of the National Gallery of Art
- Federal Reserve Bank of Cleveland and Integrity and Security allegorical figures by Henry Hering, carved by the Piccirilli Brothers Cleveland, Ohio ca. 1923
- Civic Virtue Triumphant Over Unrighteousness sculpture group and fountain created by sculptor Frederick William MacMonnies and architect Thomas Hastings, and carved by the Piccirilli Brothers.(1922)
- Buckingham Fountain in Chicago. (1927)
- National McKinley Birthplace Memorial, McKim, Mead and White architects and J. Massey Rhind’s statue of William McKinley, in Niles, Ohio, (1915)
- Our Lady of Victory Basilica, Emile Ulrich architect, in Lackawanna, New York, (1924)
- Century Building (St. Louis), Raeder, Coffin & Crocker, architects (1896). The ten-story building's exterior combined three shades of the stone from the three principal quarries (Etowah, Kenesaw, and Creole).

== Marble ==
The company's mines contain almost every type of marble found in the United States. When exposed to the weather, the marble becomes less durable because of acid rain. Marble of every variety and size can be extracted from the mine with machinery, and transported by railroad. Types of marble include crystallized marble and white sanctuary marble, ranging in a variety of colors.

== Historic district ==
Numerous company buildings and Tate community structures are listed on the National Register of Historic Places in the Georgia Marble Company and Tate Historic District.

== See also ==
- Oglethorpe Monument - A marble monument in Jasper, Georgia, that was designed by Tate
