= Pickens County School District (Georgia) =

School district in Georgia (U.S. state)

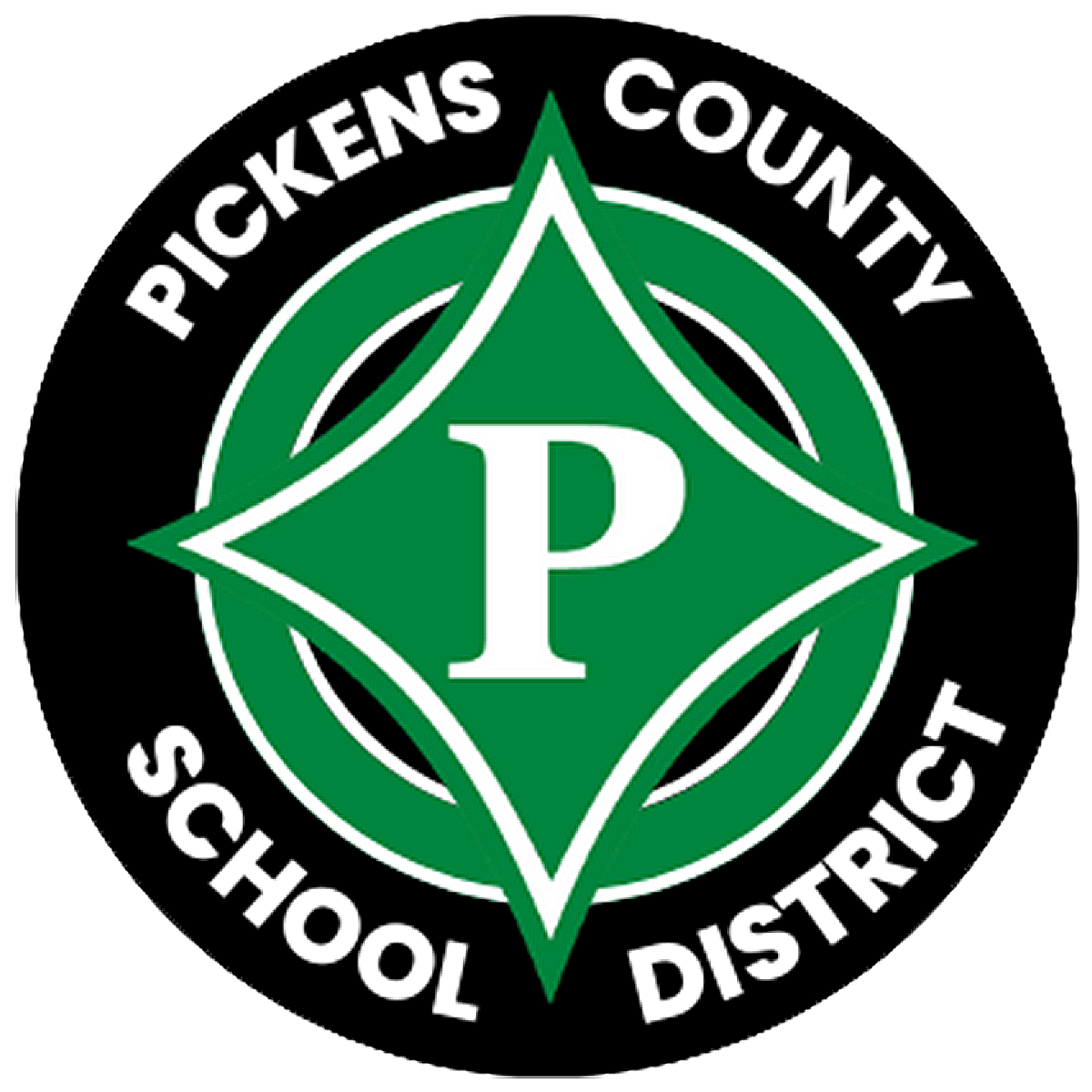

Address
- 100 D.B. Carroll Street Jasper, Georgia, 30143-1525; United States
- Coordinates: 34.467740°N 84.432973°W

District information
- Grades: Pre-kindergarten – 12
- Superintendent: Travis Thomas
- Accreditation(s): Southern Association of Colleges and Schools; Georgia Accrediting Commission

Students and staff
- Enrollment: 4,124 (2022–23)
- Faculty: 294.10 (FTE)
- Staff: 336.70 (FTE)
- Student–teacher ratio: 14.02

Other information
- Telephone: (706) 253-1700
- Website: pickens.k12.ga.us

The Pickens County School District is a public school district in Pickens County, Georgia, United States, based in Jasper.

It is the sole school district of the county, and serves the communities of Jasper, Talking Rock, Tate, and the Pickens County portion of Nelson.

== Schools ==
The Pickens County School District has three elementary schools, one middle school, one junior high school, and one high school.

Elementary schools

- Harmony Elementary School
- Hill City Elementary School
- Tate Elementary School

Middle schools

- Jasper Middle School

Junior High Schools

Pickens Junior High school

High school

Pickens High school
