= A Separate Civil War =

2006 book by Jonathan Dean Sarris

- Cover
- Author: Jonathan Dean Sarris
- Published: 2006, University of Virginia Press
- Pages: 238
- ISBN: 0-8139-2549-5

A Separate Civil War: Communities in Conflict in the Mountain South is a 2006 book by Jonathan Dean Sarris that examines the internal conflicts during the American Civil War between Lumpkin and Fannin county in Georgia. Within the book, Sarris explores the factions of Unionist and Confederate sympathizers that were present from 1861 to 1865.

== Appalachian wartime experience ==
Sarris' focus is to examine "the wartime experiences of Fannin and Lumpkin counties, located in the southern spur of the Blue Ridge Mountains." The experiences of these counties during this period are complicated by the allegiances of the local leaders toward different centers of political power. Lumpkin county was more connected to the Georgia capital than Fannin county and was therefore more open to the idea of secession in comparison. Fannin county did not have the access to the Georgia capital that Lumpkin did during this time, so the political leaders of Fannin leaned more toward federal law rather than state law and thus did not support secession as much as their neighboring county.

Sarris describes an area that was far from uniform in its ideology within his book. The notion that there could be any clear dividing lines within the region is challenged constantly throughout by Sarris. This book offers a unique look at the war's impact on Appalachia and according to Sarris, "attempts to analyze a region of the Confederacy that has not been extensively studied." The book also explores the validity of Appalachian exceptionalism.

== Guerrilla warfare in North Georgia ==
A Separate Civil War offers a look at the Civil War beyond the glorious battlefields that are often romanticized by other works and describes the far less romantic guerrilla warfare that "escaped Ken Burns's sepia tinted camera lens."
