= BC Sliven =

- Founded: 1998
- Dissolved: 2010
- Arena: Vasil Levski
- Capacity: 1,480
- Location: Sliven, Bulgaria
- Championships: None
Home	Away

BC Sliven was a professional basketball club, based in Sliven, Bulgaria. The club played in the NBL during the 2008–09 season. The team replaced BC Balkan in the NBL because of their financial problems.
