= Battle of the Narrows =

- Part of Sherman's March to the Sea and The American Civil War
Date	October 12, 1864
Location	The mountain pass of Currahee Mountain, Habersham County (now Stephens County)
Result	Confederate Victory

Belligerents
United States	Confederacy

Commanders and leaders
Kenner Garrard	Unknown

Strength
Few	Few

Casualties and losses
Very light	Very light

The Battle of the Narrows, also known as the Battle of Currahee Mountain, was a skirmish that took place on October 12, 1864, during Sherman's March to the Sea. Following his victory at the battle of Atlanta, General William Tecumseh Sherman wanted to destroy Confederate grain supplies in northeastern Georgia to hinder the Confederate war effort, and to support General Ulysses S. Grant at the Siege of Petersburg, Virginia, since the grain was used to feed the Confederate armies.

== The Battle ==
Sherman sent Kenner Garrard to go raid and capture the mostly undefended region of northeastern Georgia. Union forces arrived in the narrows outside of Currahee Mountain, and following a quick battle, the Union forces withdrew. The defense was mostly organized by locals. Casualties on both sides were few, with locals helping the wounded on both sides.
