= Nelson, Georgia =

- City
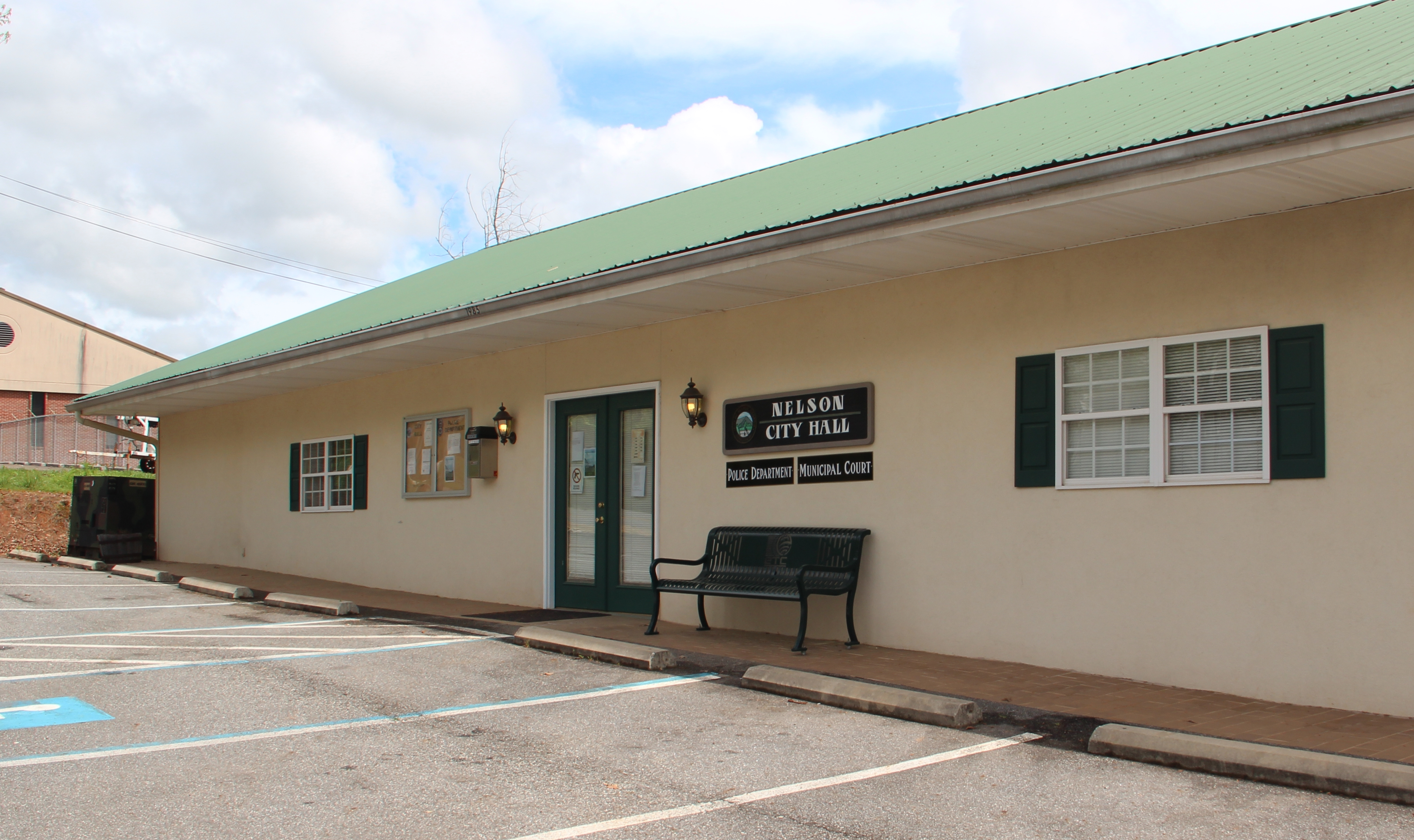
- Nelson city hall

- Seal Logo

- Location in Pickens County and the state of Georgia
- Coordinates: 34°22′54″N 84°22′17″W
- Country: United States
- State: Georgia
- Counties: Pickens, Cherokee

Area
  - Total: 1.53 sq mi (3.97 km^{2})
  - Land: 1.53 sq mi (3.95 km^{2})
  - Water: 0.0077 sq mi (0.02 km^{2})
- Elevation: 1,237 ft (377 m)

Population (2020)
  - Total: 1,145
  - Density: 751.4/sq mi (290.11/km^{2})
- Time zone: UTC-5 (Eastern (EST))
  - Summer (DST): UTC-4 (EDT)
- ZIP code: 30151
- Area code: 770
- FIPS code: 13-54572
- GNIS feature ID: 0319244
- Website: nelsongeorgia.com

Nelson is a city in Pickens and Cherokee Counties, Georgia, United States. At the 2020 census, the population was 1,145. It is part of the Atlanta metropolitan area.

== History ==
The city is named for John Nelson, an early landowner, farmer, and rifle maker. The Georgia General Assembly incorporated Nelson as a town in 1891.

The area possesses substantial deposits of marble. The railway construction in 1883 made the development of large-scale quarries possible. The quality of the marble has made it favored for federal monuments.

On April 1, 2013, the city council unanimously approved the "Family Protection Ordinance". Every head of household must own a gun and ammunition to "provide for the emergency management of the city" and to "provide for and protect the safety, security, and general welfare of the city and its inhabitants." Residents are not required to buy one if they do not have one, and the ordinance does not penalize anyone who does not comply. Convicted felons are exempt.

== Geography ==
Nelson is located on the border of Pickens and Cherokee Counties at 34°22′54″N 84°22′17″W (34.381562, -84.371303). The original city center is located in Pickens County, but the city limits have recently expanded southward so that more of the city is now located in Cherokee County.

According to the United States Census Bureau, the city has a total area of 1.5 square miles (3.8 km^{2}), of which 0.008 square miles (0.02 km^{2}), or 0.56%, is covered by water.

Nelson is served through its downtown by the Georgia Northeastern Railroad, and by Canton Road, the town's main street and the former route of Georgia State Route 5. South on old 5 is Ball Ground, and north is Tate. The north end of Interstate 575 and south end of State Route 515 are at the county line just to the west of Nelson. I-575 leads south 52 miles (84 km) to Atlanta, and SR 515 leads north 26 miles (42 km) to Ellijay.

== Demographics ==
Historical population
Census	Pop.	Note	%±
1890	266		—
1900	254		−4.5%
1910	550		116.5%
1920	511		−7.1%
1930	798		56.2%
1940	679		−14.9%
1950	645		−5.0%
1960	658		2.0%
1970	613		−6.8%
1980	562		−8.3%
1990	486		−13.5%
2000	626		28.8%
2010	1,314		109.9%
2020	1,145		−12.9%
U.S. Decennial Census

=== 2020 census ===
As of the 2020 census, Nelson had a population of 1,145. The median age was 40.8 years. 23.0% of residents were under the age of 18 and 16.4% of residents were 65 years of age or older. For every 100 females there were 100.5 males, and for every 100 females age 18 and over there were 96.9 males age 18 and over.

0.0% of residents lived in urban areas, while 100.0% lived in rural areas.

There were 429 households in Nelson, of which 39.9% had children under the age of 18 living in them. Of all households, 57.3% were married-couple households, 17.2% were households with a male householder and no spouse or partner present, and 19.1% were households with a female householder and no spouse or partner present. About 18.0% of all households were made up of individuals and 10.5% had someone living alone who was 65 years of age or older.

There were 449 housing units, of which 4.5% were vacant. The homeowner vacancy rate was 0.0% and the rental vacancy rate was 0.0%.

Nelson racial composition as of 2020
Race	Num.	Perc.
White (non-Hispanic)	1,018	88.91%
Black or African American (non-Hispanic)	28	2.45%
Native American	3	0.26%
Asian	2	0.17%
Other/Mixed	46	4.02%
Hispanic or Latino	48	4.19%

=== Demographic estimates ===
Circa 2023, of the 1,164 people in Nelson, 865 lived in Pickens County and 599 lived in Cherokee County.

== Education ==
Areas in Pickens County are in the Pickens County School District. All residents of that district are zoned to Jasper Middle School, Pickens Junior High School, and Pickens High School.

Areas in Cherokee County are in the Cherokee County School District. Residents of that portion are zoned to Ball Ground Elementary School, Creekland Middle School, and Creekview High School.

== Notable person ==
- Claude Akins, actor
