= Tate, Georgia =

Unincorporated community in Georgia, U.S.

Tate
- Unincorporated Community
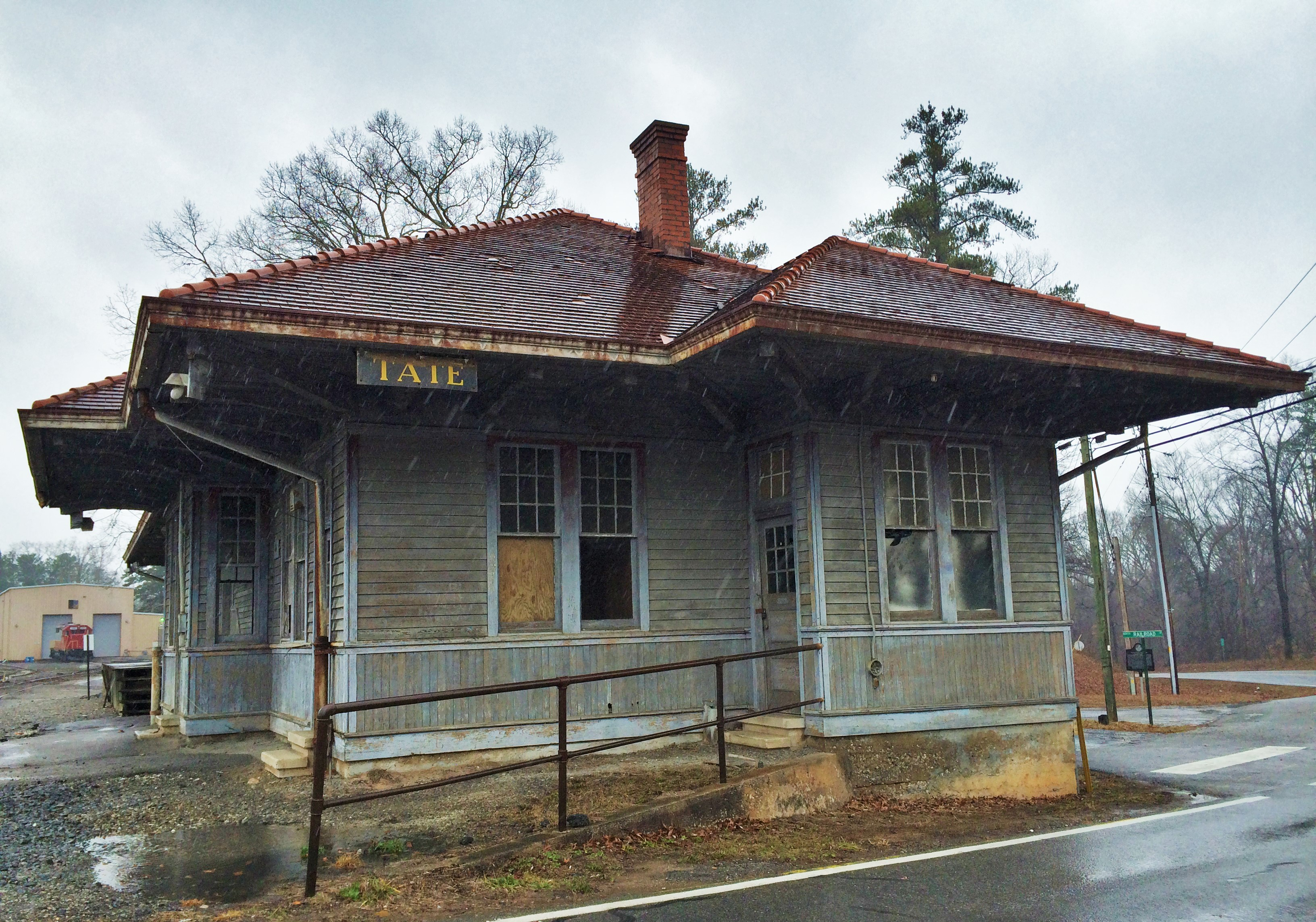
- Tate Georgia historic railway depot

- Location within the state of Georgia Tate (the United States)
- Coordinates: 34°25′6″N 84°22′58″W
- Country: United States
- State: Georgia
- County: Pickens
- Elevation: 1,247 ft (380 m)
- Time zone: UTC-5 (Eastern (EST))
  - Summer (DST): UTC-4 (EDT)
- ZIP code: 30177
- Area codes: 470,678,770 and 943

Tate is an unincorporated community in Pickens County, Georgia, United States. The Georgia Marble Company and Tate Historic District in Tate is listed on the National Register of Historic Places. The historic district is centered on GA 53 between GA 5 and Long Swamp Creek.

Tate's post office was originally called Marble Works by the United States Postal Service. The area was later known as Harnageville after Ambrose Harnage. The home of Ambrose Harnage was authorized by the Georgia General Assembly to be the first meeting place for county courts for Cherokee County when the county was first established, which functioned as a large territory rather than a true county during the State of Georgia's initial organization of the final Cherokee territory within the state.

Elections for a full county government were held in 1832, and court was held at the Harnage house. Prior to that time many county government functions were administered by adjacent counties. In December 1832 Cherokee County was divided into seven other counties and the town was renamed Tate after Colonel Sam Tate in 1880. Other variant names for this place include Harnages, Harnage, and Tateville.

== Georgia Marble ==
Tate includes the main quarries of the Georgia Marble Company, a new division of the second largest stone company in North America, Polycor. The quarries are internationally known for the quality of the marble and are served by the Georgia Northeastern Railroad. The area is also near Interstate 575 which travels to metro Atlanta, which ends into State Route 515 just to the south in Nelson. Former State Route 5 is the main street through Tate, though the GDOT has moved that number onto 575 and 515.

== Tate House ==
The Tate House is a historic home that once served as a restaurant and bed & breakfast in Tate. It now does business as a facility for weddings and other special events.

== Education ==
All areas of Pickens County are in the Pickens County School District. Tate Elementary School is in the community. All residents of that district are zoned to Jasper Middle School, Pickens Junior High School, and Pickens High School.
