= Pickens County, Georgia =

County in Georgia, United States

- County
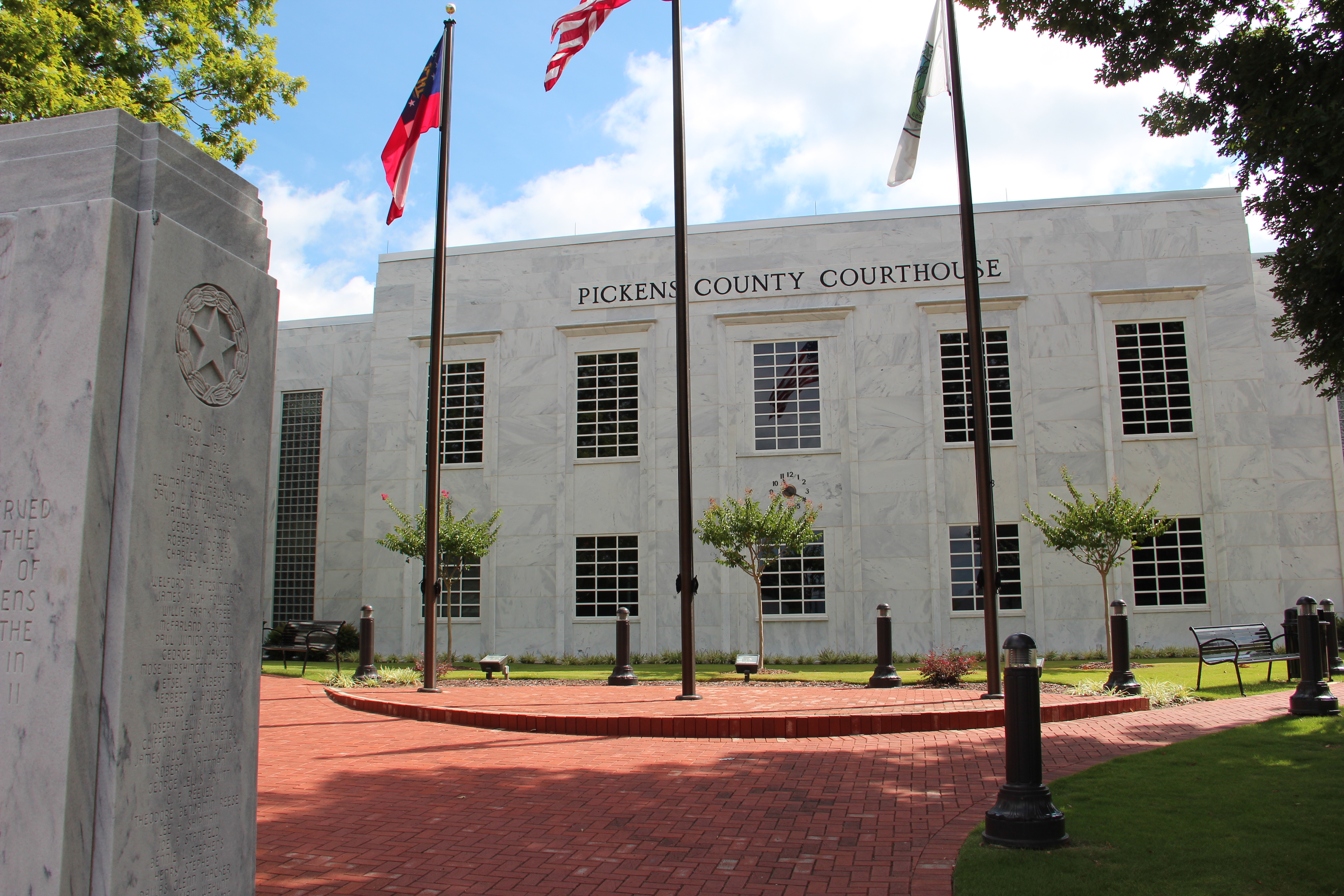
- Pickens County Courthouse, Jasper

- Flag Seal

- Location within the U.S. state of Georgia
- Coordinates: 34°28′N 84°28′W
- Country: United States
- State: Georgia
- Founded: December 5, 1853; 172 years ago
- Named for: Andrew Pickens
- Seat: Jasper
- Largest city: Jasper

Area
  - Total: 233 sq mi (600 km^{2})
  - Land: 232 sq mi (600 km^{2})
  - Water: 0.7 sq mi (1.8 km^{2}) 0.3%

Population (2020)
  - Total: 33,216
  - Estimate (2025): 37,167 ▲
  - Density: 143/sq mi (55/km^{2})
- Time zone: UTC−5 (Eastern)
  - Summer (DST): UTC−4 (EDT)
- Congressional districts: 9th, 14th
- Website: pickenscountyga.gov

Pickens County is a county in the Northwest region of the U.S. state of Georgia. As of the 2020 census, the population was 33,216. The county seat is Jasper. Pickens County is part of the Atlanta-Sandy Springs-Roswell, Georgia metropolitan statistical area.

== History ==
The Georgia General Assembly passed an act on December 5, 1853, to create Pickens County from portions of Cherokee and Gilmer Counties. Pickens received several more land additions from Cherokee (1869) and Gilmer Counties (1858 and 1863); however, several sections of Pickens County have also been transferred to other counties: Dawson County (1857), Gordon County (1860), and Cherokee County (1870).

Pickens County is named for American Revolutionary War General Andrew Pickens.

During the Civil War, Company D of the 1st Georgia Infantry Battalion of the Union Army was raised in Pickens County.

Most of Pickens County's early industry revolved around marble. Georgia Marble Company is located in Marble Hill near Tate. The Tate elementary school is built out of marble. The marble was also used to make the statue of Abraham Lincoln in the Lincoln Memorial. Most of the marble is white, but Pickens County is one of the few places in the world where pink marble is found. The marble is also used for tombstones for the United States military.

Pickens County has seen very rapid growth with the building of Georgia State Route 515, locally referred to as the "four-lane". Many new businesses and residents continue to move to Pickens County.

Pickens County is home the Georgia Marble Festival.

== Geography ==
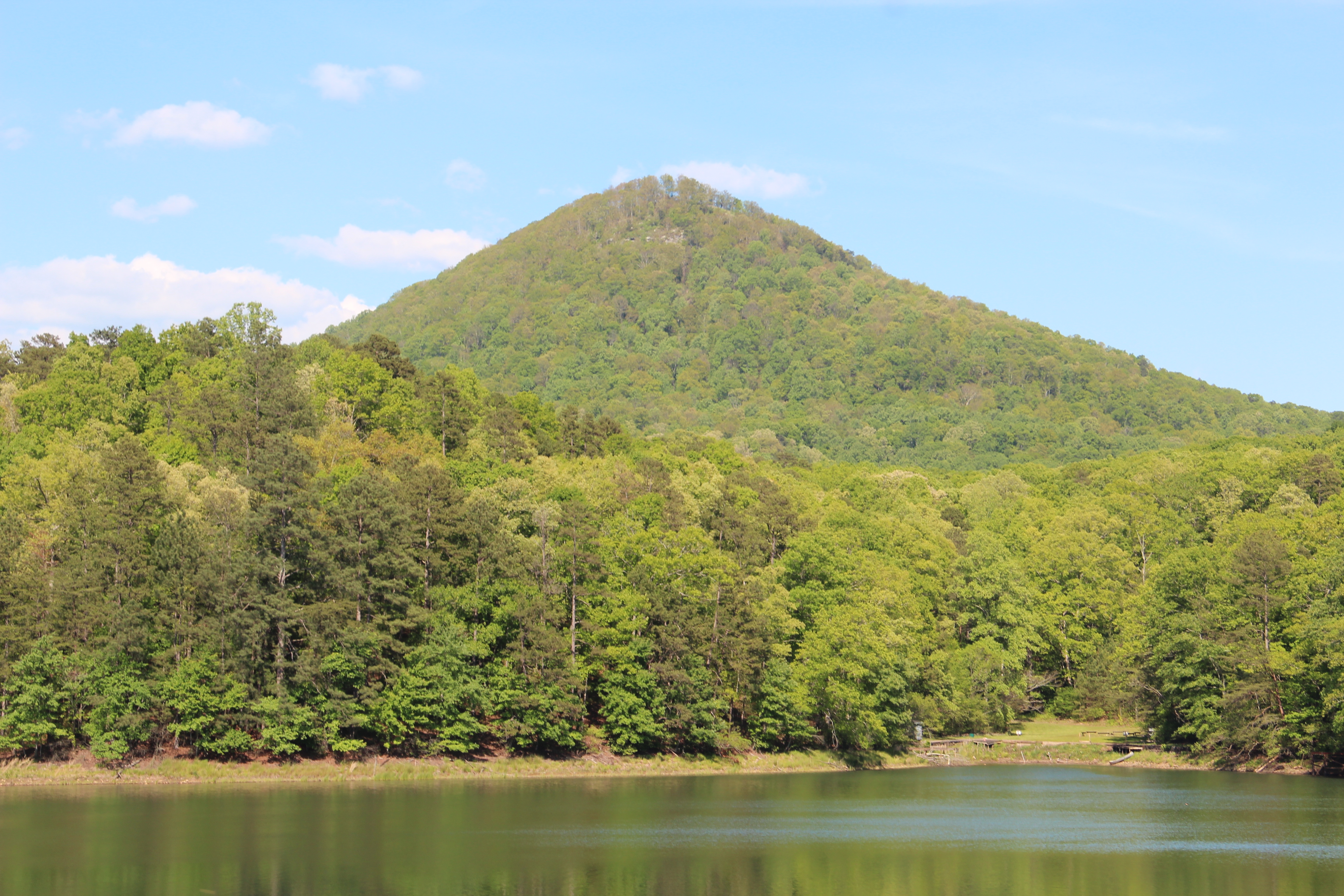
Sharp Top Mountain, viewed from Grandview Lake Dam

According to the U.S. Census Bureau, the county has a total area of 233 square miles (600 km^{2}), of which 232 square miles (600 km^{2}) are land and 0.7 square miles (1.8 km^{2}) (0.3%) is covered by water.

The county is located in the Blue Ridge Mountains. The highest point in Pickens County is the 3,288-ft summit of Mount Oglethorpe, the southernmost peak in the Blue Ridge Mountains, and for a number of years, the southern terminus of the Appalachian Trail. Other notable peaks in Pickens County include Sharp Top Mountain and Sharp Mountain. One of the best viewpoints of Sharp Top Mountain is from Grandview Lake Dam on Grandview Road.

The eastern half of Pickens County is located in the Etowah River subbasin of the ACT River Basin (Coosa-Tallapoosa River Basin). The western half of the county is located in the Coosawattee River sub-basin of the same larger ACT River Basin.

=== Adjacent counties ===
- Gilmer County - north
- Dawson County - east
- Cherokee County - south
- Bartow County - southwest
- Gordon County - west

== Communities ==
=== Cities ===
- Jasper
- Nelson (partially in Cherokee County)

=== Town ===
- Talking Rock

=== Unincorporated communities ===
- Tate
- Marble Hill
- Blaine

=== Private communities ===
A significant portion of the county population resides in gated master-planned communities that function similar to a municipality, with HOA fees to provide many municipal-type services independently from the county government.

- Bent Tree
- Big Canoe (partially in Dawson County)

== Demographics ==
Historical population
Census	Pop.	Note	%±
1860	4,951		—
1870	5,317		7.4%
1880	6,790		27.7%
1890	8,182		20.5%
1900	8,641		5.6%
1910	9,041		4.6%
1920	8,222		−9.1%
1930	9,687		17.8%
1940	9,136		−5.7%
1950	8,855		−3.1%
1960	8,903		0.5%
1970	9,620		8.1%
1980	11,652		21.1%
1990	14,432		23.9%
2000	22,983		59.3%
2010	29,431		28.1%
2020	33,216		12.9%
2025 (est.)	37,167	▲	11.9%
U.S. Decennial Census; 1790-1880 1890-1910; 1920-1930 1930-1940; 1940-1950 1960-1980; 1980-2000 2010

=== Racial and ethnic composition ===
Pickens County, Georgia – Racial and ethnic composition Note: the US Census treats Hispanic/Latino as an ethnic category. This table excludes Latinos from the racial categories and assigns them to a separate category. Hispanics/Latinos may be of any race.
Race / Ethnicity (NH = Non-Hispanic)	Pop 1980	Pop 1990	Pop 2000	Pop 2010	Pop 2020	% 1980	% 1990	% 2000	% 2010	% 2020
White alone (NH)	11,306	14,091	21,897	27,802	30,122	97.03%	97.64%	95.27%	94.47%	90.69%
Black or African American alone (NH)	264	245	292	297	286	2.27%	1.70%	1.27%	1.01%	0.86%
Native American or Alaska Native alone (NH)	7	31	84	69	85	0.06%	0.21%	0.37%	0.23%	0.26%
Asian alone (NH)	9	19	52	118	191	0.08%	0.13%	0.23%	0.40%	0.58%
Native Hawaiian or Pacific Islander alone (NH)	x	x	6	5	4	x	x	0.03%	0.02%	0.01%
Other race alone (NH)	0	0	12	13	70	0.00%	0.00%	0.05%	0.04%	0.21%
Mixed race or Multiracial (NH)	x	x	173	308	1,260	x	x	0.75%	1.05%	3.79%
Hispanic or Latino (any race)	66	46	467	819	1,198	0.57%	0.32%	2.03%	2.78%	3.61%
Total	11,652	14,432	22,983	29,431	33,216	100.00%	100.00%	100.00%	100.00%	100.00%

=== 2020 census ===
As of the 2020 census, the county had a population of 33,216, and 19.2% of residents lived in urban areas while 80.8% lived in rural areas. Those residents comprised 13,120 households and 8,539 families.

The median age was 47.7 years, 19.3% of residents were under the age of 18, and 24.4% were 65 years of age or older. For every 100 females there were 97.0 males, and for every 100 females age 18 and over there were 95.1 males age 18 and over.

The racial makeup of the county was 91.5% White, 0.9% Black or African American, 0.4% American Indian and Alaska Native, 0.6% Asian, 0.0% Native Hawaiian and Pacific Islander, 1.4% from some other race, and 5.1% from two or more races. Hispanic or Latino residents of any race comprised 3.6% of the population.

Of the 13,120 households, 26.4% had children under the age of 18 living with them and 22.0% had a female householder with no spouse or partner present. About 22.2% of all households were made up of individuals and 12.1% had someone living alone who was 65 years of age or older.

There were 14,896 housing units, of which 11.9% were vacant. Among occupied housing units, 80.6% were owner-occupied and 19.4% were renter-occupied. The homeowner vacancy rate was 1.3% and the rental vacancy rate was 5.2%.

== Politics ==
Politically, Pickens County is an outlier in Georgia, one of the few ancestrally Republican counties of the state, due to Unionist sentiment in the county during the American Civil War. As of the 2020s, Pickens County is a strongly Republican voting county, voting 83% for Donald Trump in 2024. For elections to the United States House of Representatives, Pickens County divided between Georgia's 11th congressional district, currently represented by Barry Loudermilk. For elections to the Georgia State Senate, Pickens County is part of District 51. For elections to the Georgia House of Representatives, Pickens County is part of District 11.

United States presidential election results for Pickens County, Georgia
Year	Republican		Democratic		Third party(ies)	
Year	No.	%	No.	%	No.	%
1912	190	20.41%	324	34.80%	417	44.79%
1916	344	27.28%	497	39.41%	420	33.31%
1920	830	65.51%	437	34.49%	0	0.00%
1924	1,149	60.25%	754	39.54%	4	0.21%
1928	1,319	70.84%	543	29.16%	0	0.00%
1932	743	33.54%	1,472	66.46%	0	0.00%
1936	1,053	46.27%	1,223	53.73%	0	0.00%
1940	884	43.76%	1,124	55.64%	12	0.59%
1944	795	50.48%	780	49.52%	0	0.00%
1948	1,258	46.22%	1,239	45.52%	225	8.27%
1952	1,328	50.30%	1,312	49.70%	0	0.00%
1956	2,341	65.45%	1,236	34.55%	0	0.00%
1960	1,943	56.88%	1,473	43.12%	0	0.00%
1964	1,955	50.32%	1,930	49.68%	0	0.00%
1968	1,659	44.50%	677	18.16%	1,392	37.34%
1972	2,101	80.16%	520	19.84%	0	0.00%
1976	973	27.45%	2,571	72.55%	0	0.00%
1980	1,612	39.54%	2,358	57.84%	107	2.62%
1984	2,801	67.82%	1,329	32.18%	0	0.00%
1988	3,021	67.52%	1,430	31.96%	23	0.51%
1992	2,332	40.57%	2,359	41.04%	1,057	18.39%
1996	3,041	46.31%	2,693	41.01%	832	12.67%
2000	5,488	66.92%	2,489	30.35%	224	2.73%
2004	8,115	76.28%	2,444	22.97%	80	0.75%
2008	10,004	78.08%	2,595	20.25%	214	1.67%
2012	10,547	83.03%	1,975	15.55%	180	1.42%
2016	11,651	82.51%	1,979	14.02%	490	3.47%
2020	14,110	82.17%	2,824	16.45%	238	1.39%
2024	17,281	82.62%	3,522	16.84%	112	0.54%

United States Senate election results for Pickens County, Georgia2
Year	Republican		Democratic		Third party(ies)	
Year	No.	%	No.	%	No.	%
2020	13,860	81.68%	2,678	15.78%	431	2.54%
2020	12,601	83.18%	2,548	16.82%	0	0.00%

United States Senate election results for Pickens County, Georgia3
Year	Republican		Democratic		Third party(ies)	
Year	No.	%	No.	%	No.	%
2020	7,185	42.68%	2,076	12.33%	7,575	44.99%
2020	12,532	82.75%	2,612	17.25%	0	0.00%
2022	12,050	80.32%	2,589	17.26%	364	2.43%
2022	10,986	82.35%	2,355	17.65%	0	0.00%

Georgia Gubernatorial election results for Pickens County
Year	Republican		Democratic		Third party(ies)	
Year	No.	%	No.	%	No.	%
2022	12,937	85.76%	2,041	13.53%	108	0.72%

== Transportation ==
=== Major highways ===
- Interstate 575 / State Route 417 (unsigned)
- State Route 5
  - State Route 5 Business
- State Route 53
  - State Route 53 Business
- State Route 108
- State Route 136
  - State Route 136 Connector
- State Route 372
- State Route 515

== Education ==
The Pickens County School District is the sole school district in the county.

== Notable residents ==
- Farish Carter Tate, U.S. congressman
- John Bozeman, frontiersman; co-founder of Bozeman, Montana
- Chandler Smith, professional racecar driver
- Duff Floyd, Prohibition era ATF agent

== See also ==
- National Register of Historic Places listings in Pickens County, Georgia
- List of counties in Georgia
