= Our Common Heritage =

Our Common Heritage – Great Poems Celebrating Milestones in the History of America

Studio album by Bing Crosby and others
- Released: Original 78 album: 1947 12” LP DL9072: 1959
- Recorded: 1943–1946
- Genre: Poetry
- Label: Decca

Bing Crosby chronology
Selections from Welcome Stranger (1947)	Our Common Heritage – Great Poems Celebrating Milestones in the History of America (1947)	El Bingo (1947)

Our Common Heritage – Great Poems Celebrating Milestones in the History of America is a Decca Records album of phonograph records by various artists celebrating American ideals and patriotic themes. The album was edited, with notes, by Louis Untermeyer; original music and sound effects were composed by Victor Young and Lehman Engel with the Jean Neilson Verse Choir. Artists reading are Brian Donlevy, Agnes Moorehead, Fredric March, Walter Huston, Pat O'Brien, and Bing Crosby.

== Reception ==
Howard Taubman, writing in The New York Times heralded the release of the album. “With considerable beating of the drums, Decca has issued an album called “Our Common Heritage” (eight 10 inch records). It contains sixteen poems commemorating “milestones in the history of America.” Jack Kapp, president of Decca is keynoting the campaign for this album [and writes] “Who else but Bing Crosby, who symbolises America to the world, should read The Star-Spangled Banner? And who else should make it a living experience, read as we believe Francis Scott Key felt it?” Who else, indeed? Unless of course, it should occur to you that you could read it for yourself....If it makes American ideals shine more brightly for them to hear Bing Crosby, Pat O’Brien and the others dramatize them, only a bounder would disagree with Mr. Kapp.”

== Track listing ==
These songs were featured on an 8-disc, 78 rpm album set, Decca Album No. A-536.

Disc 1: (40030)

1. "The American Flag", (Joseph Rodman Drake), recorded December 17, 1945 by Brian Donlevy with Victor Young and His Orchestra.
2. “Columbus", (Joaquin Miller), recorded December 17, 1945 by Brian Donlevy with Victor Young and His Orchestra.

Disc 2: (40031)

3. "Barbara Frietchie", (John Greenleaf Whittier), recorded January 23, 1946 by Agnes Moorehead with Victor Young and His Orchestra.
4. “Landing of the Pilgrim Fathers", (Felicia Dorothea Hemans) recorded January 23, 1946 by Agnes Moorehead with Victor Young and His Orchestra.

Disc 3: (40032)

5. "Paul Revere's Ride", (Henry Wadsworth Longfellow) recorded June 11, 1946 by Fredric March with Victor Young and His Orchestra.
6. "Paul Revere's Ride", (Henry Wadsworth Longfellow), recorded June 11, 1946 by Fredric March with Victor Young and His Orchestra.

Disc 4: (40033)

7. "Hail, Columbia" (Joseph Hopkinson), recorded October 31, 1944 by Walter Huston with Victor Young and His Orchestra.
8. “Warren’s Address to American Soldiers (June 17, 1775) (John Pierpont) / Concord Hymn" (Ralph Waldo Emerson), recorded November 1, 1944 by Walter Huston with Victor Young and His Orchestra.

Disc 5: (40034)

9. "America" (Samuel Francis Smith), recorded September 12, 1943 by Pat O’Brien with Victor Young and His Orchestra.
10. "Sheridan’s Ride" (Thomas Buchanan Read), recorded June 14, 1946 by Pat O’Brien with Victor Young and His Orchestra.

Disc 6: (40035)

11. "The Star-Spangled Banner" (Francis Scott Key), recorded August 15, 1946 by Bing Crosby with Victor Young and His Orchestra.
12. "Old Ironsides" (Oliver Wendell Holmes), recorded August 15, 1946 by Bing Crosby with Victor Young and His Orchestra.

Disc 7: (40036)

13. "Nancy Hanks" (Rosemary Benét), recorded January 23, 1946 by Agnes Moorehead with Victor Young and His Orchestra.
14. “Lincoln, Man of the People" (Edwin Markham), recorded May 16, 1946 by Walter Huston and the Lehman Engel Orchestra.

Disc 8: (40037)

15. "Abraham Lincoln Walks at Midnight" (Vachel Lindsay), recorded May 16, 1946 by Walter Huston and the Lehman Engel Orchestra.
16. “O Captain! My Captain!" (Walt Whitman), recorded May 16, 1946 by Walter Huston and the Lehman Engel Orchestra.

== LP release ==
The album was re-released as a 12” LP (DL 9072) in 1959.

== LP track listing ==
SIDE ONE

1. “Columbus"
2. "The American Flag”
3. “Landing of the Pilgrim Fathers"
4. "Barbara Frietchie"
5. "Paul Revere’s Ride"
6. "Paul Revere’s Ride"
7. “Warren’s Address to American Soldiers (June 17, 1775) / Concord Hymn"
8. "Hail Columbia"

SIDE TWO

1. “America”
2. “Sheridan’s Ride"
3. "The Star-Spangled Banner"
4. “Old Ironsides
5. "Nancy Hanks"
6. “Lincoln, Man of the People"
7. “O Captain! My Captain!"
8. "Abraham Lincoln Walks at Midnight"
