= First Parish in Cambridge =

Church building in Massachusetts, United States of America

Coordinates: 42°22′28.5″N 71°7′9.3″W

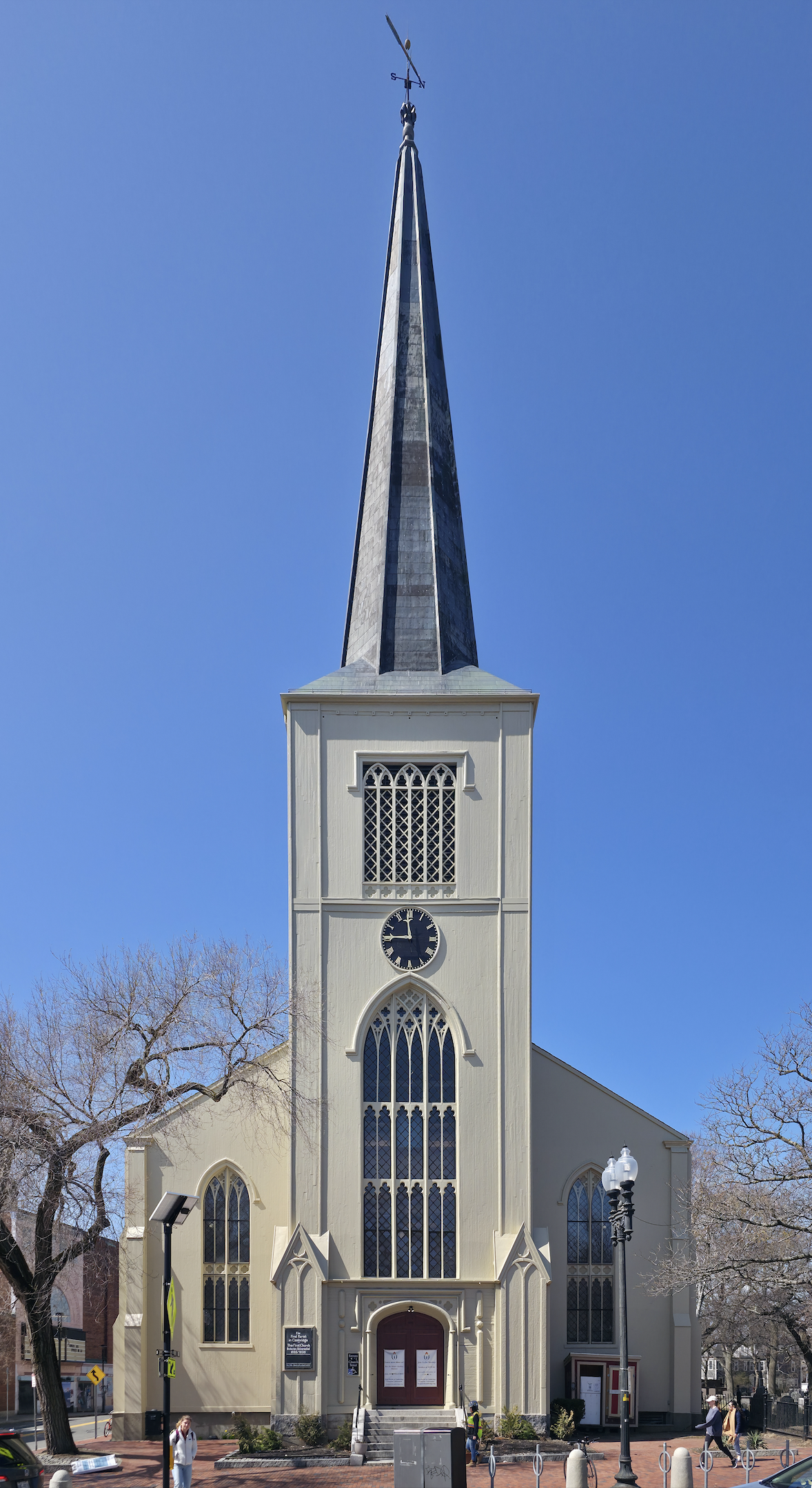
- First Parish in 2025
- First Parish in Cambridge
- Address: 3 Church Street
- Country: United States
- Denomination: Unitarian Universalist Association
- Website: www.firstparishcambridge.org

History
- Founded: 1 January 1636
- Founder: Thomas Shepard

First Parish in Cambridge is a Unitarian Universalist church, located in Harvard Square in Cambridge, Massachusetts. It is a Welcoming Congregation and a member of the Unitarian Universalist Association. The church is notable for its almost 400-year history, which includes pivotal roles in the development of the early Massachusetts government, the creation of Harvard College, and the refinement of current liberal religious thought.

== Site history ==
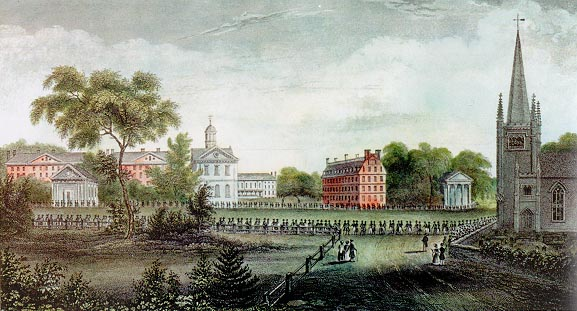
An 1836 illustration by the daughter of Harvard President Josiah Quincy III of the September 1836 procession of Harvard alumni leaving the First Parish Meeting House and walking to the Pavilion

The original First Parish, called at the time the first Meeting House, was built near the corner of Dunster and Mount Auburn streets in 1632. The Meeting House's first minister, Thomas Hooker, stayed only a handful of years; he and most of his flock moved to Connecticut to escape religious persecution in 1636. Reverend Thomas Shepard, a significant leader of the great Puritan migration to New England at the time, gathered a new church, the First Church in Cambridge, on February 1, 1636. One year later, Reverend Shepard used his influence with the General Court of Massachusetts to move Harvard College to Newtowne (later called Cambridge), a short distance away from his newly established church, so that the Harvard college students might "benefit from proximity" to his evangelical preaching. The Harvard College Yard became the site for the second Meeting House, built in 1652, and the third, in 1706, and the fourth, 1756, all located in the corner now occupied by the college's Lehman Hall.

In 1833, the congregation built the fifth and final Meeting House, which stands adjacent to present-day Harvard Yard. Harvard College held its annual commencement ceremonies therein for the next forty years. Five Harvard College presidents—Everett, Sparks, Walker, Felton, Hill, and Eliot—began their inaugural terms there as well. The Parish House was built in 1902, and the interior of the Meeting House remodeled in 1914. The Crothers chapel was dedicated in 1941.

== Governmental role ==
In the century following the founding of the Town of Cambridge in 1630, the whole community transacted the parish affairs through town meetings. Said another way, the townspeople were responsible for governing the area and for providing financial support for the Meeting House and the ministry. In 1733, the First Parish in Cambridge moved away from its close governmental role and separately organized itself as a territorial parish. Within the town (which was considered a "parish" after 1733), the church was a relatively small, covenanted body of those admitted to full communion. Such costs as the maintenance of the meeting house and the salary of the town's "public teacher of piety, religion, and morality" (who was also the minister of the church) were met by regular assessments on all persons domiciled within the territorial limits of the parish (unless exempted because they were supporting either Baptist or Episcopal worship). The power of the parish to assess the inhabitants for ecclesiastical purposes was abolished in Massachusetts in 1833. Since then, the parish has been a poll parish, rather than a territorial parish.

== Evolution of church doctrine ==
Throughout the 17th century, Reverend Shepard and his successors preached a Calvinistic doctrine. In the 18th century, the ministers moved the theology in a more liberal direction. Specifically, Reverend William Brattle and Reverend Nathaniel Appleton amended their Calvinist preaching to encourage "free inquiry", and they held a tolerant and catholic spirit towards those who differed on doctrinal matters. Appleton's successor, Timothy Hilliard, was Arminian rather than Calvinistic in theology.

The division between Calvinists and Arminians, which appeared in many churches of the Standing Order in the 18th century, reached a time of crisis in the period from 1805 to 1830. The minister of the Cambridge church at that time was the Reverend Abiel Holmes, the father of Oliver Wendell Holmes. Reverend Holmes held to orthodox doctrinal views, but he remained on friendly terms with the liberal or Arminian party for three decades after his installation in 1792. In 1826, however, he decided to break off relations with the liberals, specifically abolishing pulpit exchanges with the liberal or Unitarian ministers.

After vainly attempting to persuade Reverend Holmes to return to his earlier, more inclusive practices, the Parish voted to dismiss him as its public teacher of religion and morality. By 1829, most of the Parish became Unitarian. Dr. Holmes and the more conservative members of his flock departed and founded the Shepard Congregational Society. In 1899, it was agreed that the church associated with that society should be called the First Church in Cambridge (Congregational), now part of the United Church of Christ, and this church, the First Parish in Cambridge (Unitarian) [now Unitarian Universalist].

The Reverend William Newell, the church's first avowedly Unitarian minister, led the congregation from 1830 to 1868. His immediate successor, Francis Greenwood Peabody, would become a leader of the Social Gospel movement. The fourteenth minister, Reverend Dr. Samuel McChord Crothers, an eloquent preacher and widely read essayist, managed to attract a following from both the University and the Old Cambridge communities.

In 1837, Transcendentalist Ralph Waldo Emerson delivered his now famous "American Scholar" address—referred to by Oliver Wendell Holmes as America's "Intellectual Declaration of Independence"—at the First Parish Church.

== Present membership ==
Since its founding, the town of Cambridge has changed greatly. Instead of being a rural community, separated from Boston by an hour's travel time, the town has become an urban center in its own right. The Cambridge church is to all intents and purposes a downtown church. Its membership fluctuates, as urban communities do, and its composition varies. The current church leadership, however, is committed to maintaining the witness of liberal religion, in keeping with the struggles of earlier generations.

== Notable personages ==
- Thomas Hooker established the first Meeting House in 1633.
- The General Court of Massachusetts banished Anne Hutchinson from Massachusetts during sessions held in the first Meeting House in 1637.
- Benjamin Kent was baptized in 1708
- U.S. President George Washington worshiped in the fourth Meeting House in 1775.
- Edward Everett received the General Marquis de Lafayette with an address of welcome in 1825.
- Ralph Waldo Emerson gave his Phi Beta Kappa oration on "The American Scholar" in 1837.

== Ministers of First Parish in Cambridge ==
- 1633–1636 Thomas Hooker
- 1633–1636 Samuel Stone
- 1636–1649 Thomas Shepard
- 1649–1650 Henry Dunster (interim)
- 1650–1668 Jonathan Mitchel
- 1671–1681 Urian Oakes
- 1682–1692 Nathaniel Gookin, son of Major-General Daniel Gookin
- 1696–1717 William Brattle, father of William Brattle
- 1717–1784 Nathaniel Appleton
- 1783–1790 Timothy Hilliard
- 1792–1829 Abiel Holmes
- 1830–1868 William Newell
- 1874–1879 Francis G. Peabody
- 1882–1893 Edward H. Hall, a first cousin of Miss Mary Lee Ware
- 1894–1927 Samuel M. Crothers
- 1928–1934 Ralph E. Bailey
- 1935–1944 Leslie T. Pennington
- 1945–1958 Wilburn B. Miller
- 1959–1977 Ralph N. Helverson
- 1978–1987 Edwin A. Lane
- 1989–2006 Thomas J. S. Mikelson
- 1997–2007 Jory Agate
- 2008–2015 Fred Small
- 2010–2014 Lilia Cuervo
- 2017–2022 Adam Lawrence Dyer
- 2022–Present Robert M. Hardies

== Multiculturalism and social justice ==
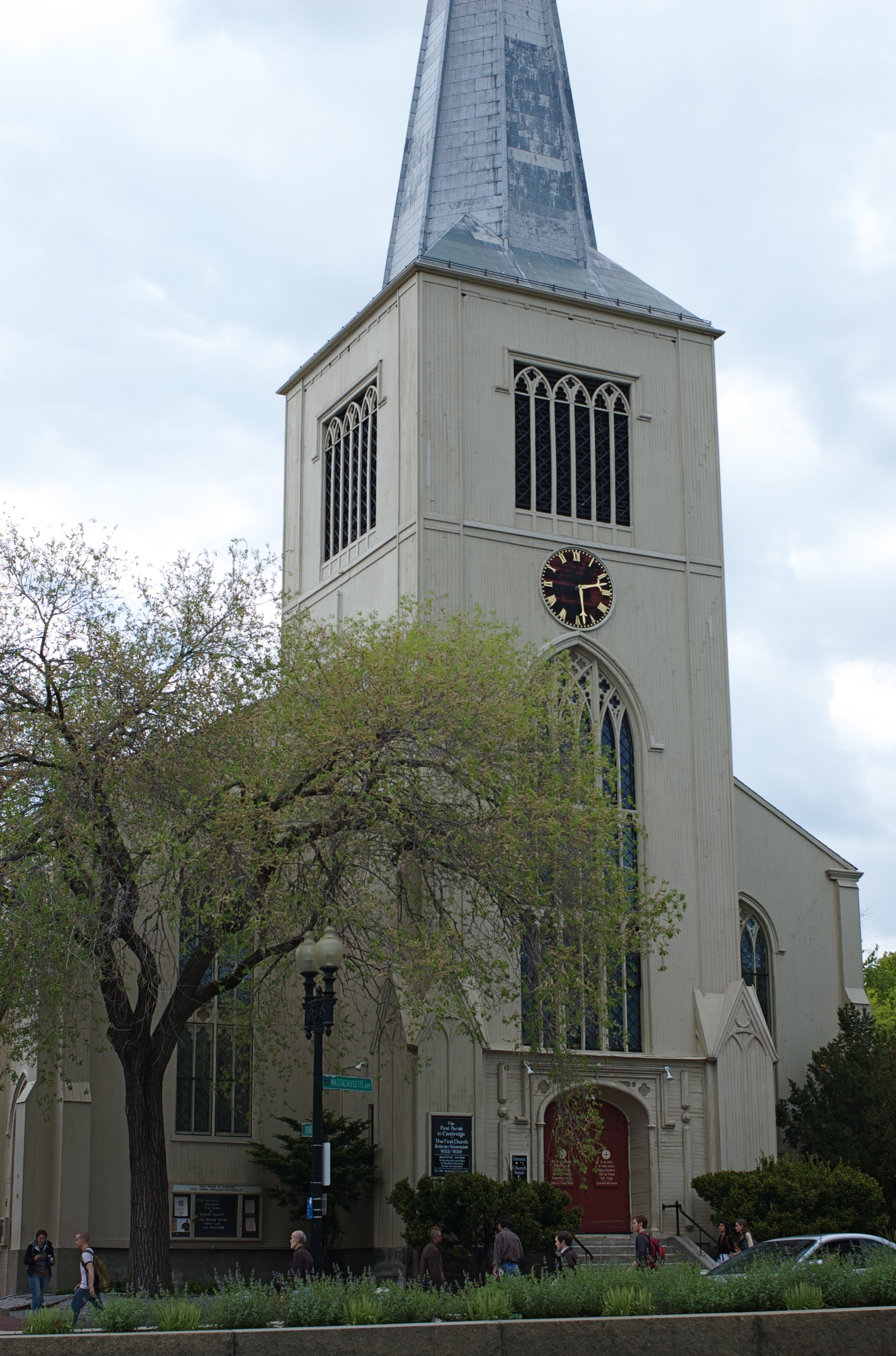
The current site of First Parish in Cambridge

In 1967, First Parish founded the speakers series Cambridge Forum, which began radio broadcasts in 1970.

In 2011, the congregation's rainbow flag was stolen and rededicated two weeks later.

In 2013, First Parish in Cambridge voted unanimously to divest its holdings in fossil fuel stocks over the next five years.

In 2015, the congregation approved a proposal by Y2Y Harvard Square, a program of the Phillips Brooks House Association, to convert Stebbins Auditorium into a young adult homeless shelter that would also house Youth on Fire, the LGBTQ-friendly youth service center, on weekdays.

== Sources ==
- Cambridge, Massachusetts. First Parish in Cambridge. Records, 1658-1993, Andover-Harvard Theological Library, Harvard Divinity School
