= The Small One (album) =

The Small One: A Christmas Story

Studio album by Bing Crosby
- Released: Original 78 album: 1947; Original LP album: 1949
- Recorded: 1947
- Genre: Short story
- Length: 12:41
- Label: Decca

Bing Crosby chronology
El Bingo (1947)	The Small One: A Christmas Story (1947)	The Man Without a Country (1947)

The Small One is the sixth solo studio album by American singer and actor Bing Crosby, released in 1947 as a Deccalite phonograph records of a Charles Tazewell story. It was produced and directed by Paramount Pictures producer Robert Welch with musical accompaniment from Victor Young and His Orchestra.

== Background and reception ==
"The Small One", one of the most touching of all Christmas stories, was first produced in 1939 on the Kate Smith radio show by Robert Welch, who later became a Paramount producer. It was featured in Bing Crosby's Philco Radio Time broadcast of December 25, 1946 and Decca Records soon arranged to make a new recording of it. This took place on March 20, 1947. The album was released on September 2, 1947 and in due course it was ordered by more than 1,500 private schools in the USA.

Crosby researcher Fred Reynolds outlined the story:

This Christmas story is narrated by Crosby when, in Old Mexico at the hour of siesta, he sees the boy Pablo berating a disreputable looking donkey. He explains that what is mistaken for stubbornness in the breed is, in fact, the pride that was brought by one that fulfilled their destiny. He relates how, many years ago, a boy was sent by his father to take an old donkey (the "Small One") to the tanner and obtain a piece of silver for its hide; of how the boy first tried to save the animal by selling it to a new owner at an auction where he was scoffed at and re-buffed; of how, entering the tanner's gate he is stopped by a stranger asking if he will sell the donkey to him as he has to undertake a long journey and his wife is not well; of how, when the new owner is stopped at the town gate by a soldier and asked his identity, replies that he is Joseph, his wife is Mary and that they are on their way to Bethlehem. There, in a stable, a King was born and the Small One was envied for becoming part of a great miracle.

Bing tells the charming story with conviction and he is well supported by the other actors and the background effects and music provided by Victor Young with a "Silent Night, Holy Night" conclusion. The "hoofbeats" effects (the same notes that the angels sang in their rejoicing) are adroitly interpolated.

Crosby repeated The Small One on his Philco shows of December 24, 1947 and December 22, 1948.

== Track listing ==
These songs were featured on a 2-disc, 78 rpm album set, Decca Album No. A-553, which was auto-coupled for ease of playing with a record changer.

Disc 1: (40040)

1. "Part One" – 2:59
2. "Part Four" – 3:16

Disc 2: (40041)

3. "Part Two" – 3:18
4. "Part Three" – 3:08

== Other releases ==
Decca released a dual 10" LP of The Happy Prince and The Small One on Decca DL 6000 in 1949.

"The Small One" first appeared on CD on Jonzo's The Chronological Bing Crosby Vol. 44 (JZCD-44).

== Film version ==
In 1978, Walt Disney Productions produced an animated Christmas short film version called The Small One, directed by Don Bluth (an animator who would end up leaving Disney the following year, due to creative differences), who animated the auction scene for the movie.
