= Welcome Stranger (1947 film) =

1947 film by Elliott Nugent

- Theatrical release poster
- Directed by: Elliott Nugent
- Written by: Arthur Sheekman (screenplay); N. Richard Nash (adaptation); Arthur Sheekman (adaptation)
- Story by: Frank Butler
- Produced by: Sol C. Siegel
- Starring: Bing Crosby; Barry Fitzgerald
- Cinematography: Lionel Lindon
- Edited by: Everett Douglas
- Music by: Robert Emmett Dolan
- Production company: Paramount Pictures
- Release date: June 13, 1947
- Running time: 107 minutes
- Country: United States
- Language: English
- Box office: $6.1 million (est. US/ Canada rentals)

Welcome Stranger is a 1947 film directed by Elliott Nugent and starring Bing Crosby, Barry Fitzgerald, and Joan Caulfield. It was filmed in Hollywood with location shots at Munz Lakes during March to May 1946. Elliott Nugent appeared in one scene as a doctor sent to examine Barry Fitzgerald, and that scene was directed by Billy Wilder.

== Plot ==
Crusty Dr. McRory (Barry Fitzgerald) of Fallbridge, Maine, hires a replacement for his vacation sight unseen. Alas, he and young singing doctor Jim Pearson (Bing Crosby) don't hit it off, but Pearson is delighted to stay once he meets teacher Trudy Mason (Joan Caulfield). The locals, taking their cue from McRory, cold-shoulder Pearson, especially Trudy's stuffy fiancée. But then, guess who needs an emergency appendectomy.

== Cast ==
- Bing Crosby as Dr. James 'Jim' Pearson
- Joan Caulfield as Trudy Mason
- Barry Fitzgerald as Dr. Joseph McRory
- Wanda Hendrix as Emily Walters
- Frank Faylen as Bill Walters
- Elizabeth Patterson as Mrs. Gilley
- Robert Shayne as Roy Chesley
- Percy Kilbride as Nat Dorkas
- Clarence Muse as Clarence
- Elliott Nugent as Dr. White
- Caren Marsh Doll as Wife (uncredited)

== Production ==
Elliott Nugent said he made the film when struggling with his mental health. He said making the movie "roused me from the cheerless lethargy I had been experiencing for almost a year. I decided to ignore the gloomy advice of the eye doctors and plunge into any work—or fun—that interested me." However, "a friendly note from Bing Crosby at the conclusion" of the film "should have warned me. He thanked me for my help and said he valued my direction as highly as any he had ever had but suggested that I was carrying too many burdens at once. “Do you want to be the richest man in the cemetery?" he asked." Nugent would have a breakdown before The Great Gatsby.

== Release and reception ==
The film was given the biggest advertising campaign for a Paramount film since For Whom the Bell Tolls. The New York premiere was held on August 6, 1947, at the Paramount, and in its initial release period in the United States, the film took in $6.1 million in rentals, making it the highest-grossing film of 1947. Herb Michelson for Variety had seen the film at the Los Angeles tradeshow in April and commented, "Welcome Stranger should find the boxoffice [sic] path easy treading. It's crammed with all the ingredients that make for popular entertainment. . . Crosby and Fitzgerald take obvious pleasure in their friendly antagonist roles as young and old doctors... The New York Times felt that that film did not compare favorably with the previous Crosby / Fitzgerald success Going My Way. However, they considered that both men "tower over the script through sheer personality, and especially is this true in Mr. Crosby's case, for Mr. Sheekman has not invested the character of Jim Pearson with much substance. Mr. Fitzgerald's Doc McRory is a more rounded individual, and he does have some quaintly flavorsome dialogue—"blatherskite" is one of his less endearing terms for the young assistant. Joan Caulfield is lovely and competent as the teacher...

== Soundtrack ==
- "Smile Right Back at the Sun"
- "Country Style (Square Dance)"
- "My Heart Is a Hobo"
- " As Long As I'm Dreaming"

All of the songs were written by Jimmy Van Heusen (music) and Johnny Burke (lyrics) and sung by Bing Crosby. Burke and Van Heusen also wrote "Smack in the Middle of Maine" for the film but it was not used.

Crosby recorded all of the songs for Decca Records and these were issued on a 2-disc, 78 rpm album titled "Selections from Welcome Stranger". The songs were also included in the Bing's Hollywood series.
