= Lord of All Being, Throned Afar =

"Lord of All Being, Throned Afar" is a hymn with text written by American author Oliver Wendell Holmes Sr.

Holmes included the original text as a poem entitled "Sun-Day Hymn" at the end of a chapter of his series The Professor at the Breakfast Table, published in The Atlantic Monthly issue for December 1859.

It was described by John Julian as "a hymn of great merit", and focuses on the theme of the omnipresence of God. The hymn is in long meter (i.e. stanzas of four eight-syllable lines). It is most frequently set, in American hymnals, to the tunes Louvan, Mendon, and Arizona, and in Commonwealth hymnals most often to 'Maryton' and in some to 'Ombersley' or 'Uffingham'.
