= The American Scholar =

1837 speech by Ralph Waldo Emerson

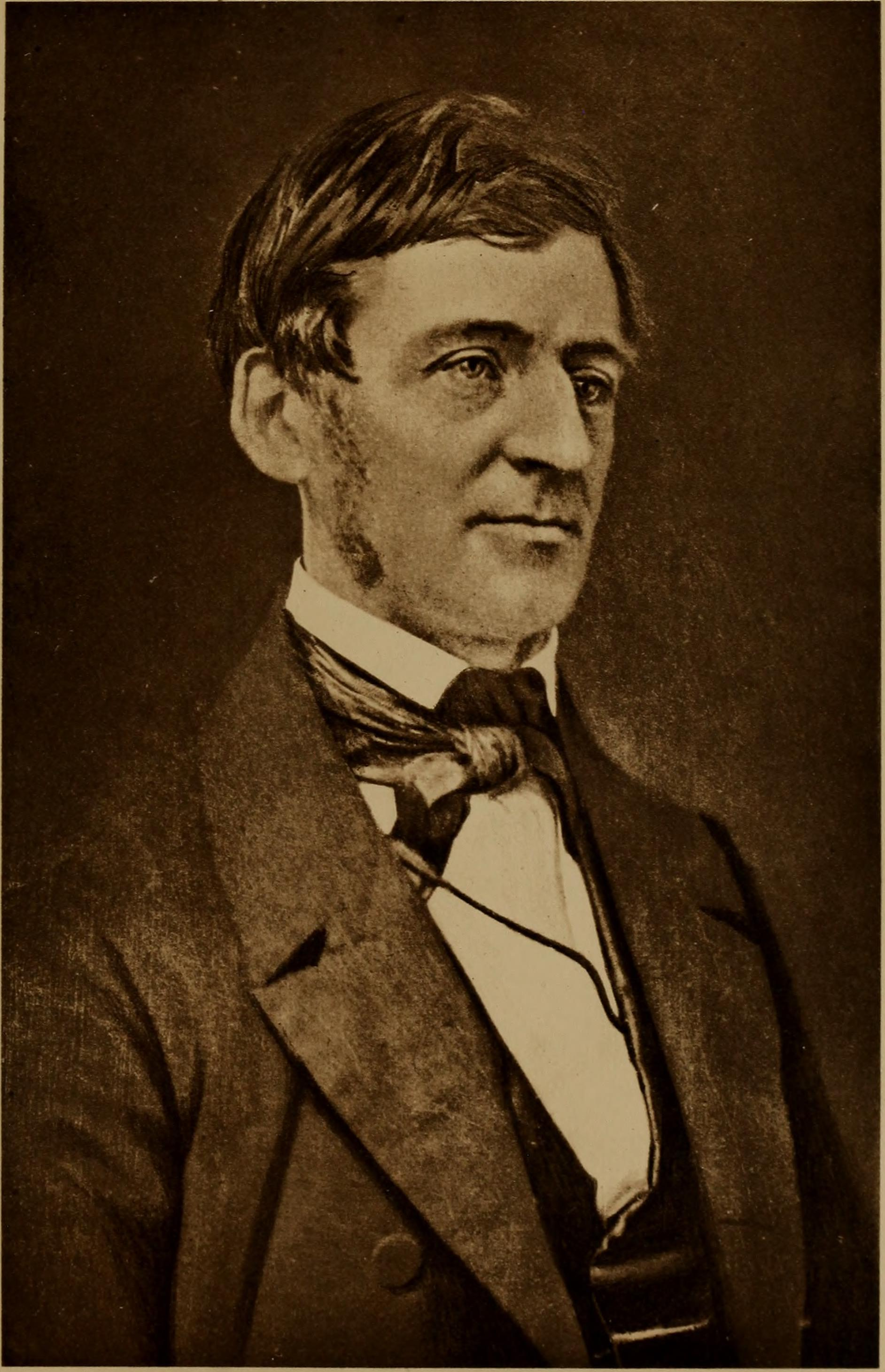
Ralph Emerson around 1847

"The American Scholar" is a speech and essay by American writer and thinker Ralph Waldo Emerson.

== Background ==
Emerson presented his speech to the Phi Beta Kappa society of Harvard College on August 31, 1837, about a year after the publication of his book Nature. Later titled "The American Scholar", the topic had become the traditional subject for the annual presentation. The speech was given at the First Parish in Cambridge in Cambridge, Massachusetts.

61 years after declaring independence, American culture was still heavily influenced by Europe, and Emerson, for possibly the first time in the country's history, provided a visionary philosophical framework for escaping "from under its iron lids" and building a new, distinctly American cultural identity.

== Summary ==
Emerson introduces Transcendentalist and Romantic views to explain an American scholar's relationship to nature. A few key points he makes include:

- We are all fragments, "as the hand is divided into fingers", of a greater creature, which is mankind itself.
- An individual may live in either of two states. In one, the busy, "divided" or "degenerate" state, he does not "possess himself" but identifies with his occupation or a monotonous action; in the other, "right" state, he is elevated to "Man", at one with all mankind.
- To achieve this higher state of mind, the modern American scholar must reject old ideas and think for himself, to become "Man Thinking" rather than "a mere thinker, or still worse, the parrot of other men's thinking", "the victim of society", "the sluggard intellect of this continent".
- "The American Scholar" has an obligation, as "Man Thinking", within this "One Man" concept, to see the world clearly, not severely influenced by traditional and historical views, and to broaden his understanding of the world from fresh eyes, to "defer never to the popular cry."
- The scholar's education consists of three influences:
  - I. Nature, as the most important influence on the mind
  - II. The Past, manifest in books
  - III. Action and its relation to experience
- The last, unnumbered part of the text is devoted to Emerson's view on the "Duties" of the American Scholar who has become the "Man Thinking".
- "The scholar must needs stand wistful and admiring before this great spectacle. He must settle its value in his mind."

== Importance ==
Emerson was, in part, reflecting on his personal vocational crisis after leaving his role as a minister. Oliver Wendell Holmes Sr. declared this speech to be "the declaration of independence of American intellectual life." Building on the growing attention he received from the essay Nature, The American Scholar solidified Emerson's popularity and weight in America, a level of reverence he would hold throughout the rest of his life. Phi Beta Kappa's literary quarterly magazine, The American Scholar, was named after the speech.

This success stands in contrast with the harsh reaction to another of his speeches, "Divinity School Address", given eleven months later.

Emerson scholar Kenneth Sacks called the speech, "the most celebrated academic talk in American history".

== See also ==
- American culture
- Empiricism
- Great American Novel
- Humanism
- Romanticism
- Transcendentalism
