= El Bingo – A Collection of Latin American Favorites =

Compilation album by Bing Crosby
- Released: 1947 (original 78 rpm album); 1949 (10-inch LP DL5011)
- Recorded: 1939–1945
- Genre: Popular
- Length: 21:42
- Label: Decca

Bing Crosby chronology
| Our Common Heritage (1947) | El Bingo – A Collection of Latin American Favorites (1947) | The Small One (1947) |

El Bingo – A Collection of Latin American Favorites is a Decca Records album of phonograph records by Bing Crosby of Latin American themed songs.

== Reception ==
The Billboard review stated:

Packaging eight Latin lullabies which Bing Crosby cut in an earlier day, it all adds up to a likely El Bingo binge for the fans. A romantic ranchero, Crosby sings to Xavier Cugat's music for "Siboney, Hasta Manana, You Belong to My Heart" and "Baia". For the other two records in the set, it's the single spirited spin for "Alla En El Rancho Grande" with the Foursome adding their vocal harmonies and John Scott Trotter making the music just as spirited. Trotter frames the musical back for the pash "Amor" piping to complete the platter. For the fourth side, Crosby sings it in Spanish, with Victor Young conducting the orchestra, for "No Te Importe Saber", recognized as "Let Me Love You Tonight", and adds the English lyric for "Flores Negras", best remembered as "You're the Moment of a Lifetime". Color photo of the singer wearing a sombrero makes for an attractive cover page, with personal notes on the piper for the inside page."

== Track listing ==
These songs were featured on a 4-disc, 78 rpm album set, Decca Album No. A-547.

Disc 1 (23547):
A. "Siboney"
B. "Hasta Manana"
Disc 2 (23413):
A. "You Belong to My Heart (Solamente Una Vez)"
B. "Baia"
Dis 3: (23914) :
A. "Allá en el Rancho Grande (My Ranch)"
B. "Amor",
Disc 4 (23915) :
A. "No Te Importe Saber (Let Me Love You Tonight)" (sung in Spanish)
B. "Flores Negras (You're the Moment of a Lifetime)" (sung in Spanish)

=== LP release ===
The album was re-released as a 10-inch LP (DL 5011) in 1949.

Side one
| No. | Title | Writer(s) | Performed with | Length |
|---|---|---|---|---|
| 1. | "Siboney" (February 11, 1945) | Ernesto Lecuona, Dolly Morse | Xavier Cugat and His Waldorf Astoria Orchestra | 3:05 |
| 2. | "Hasta Manana" (February 11, 1945) | Osvaldo Farrés, Eddie DeLange | Xavier Cugat and His Waldorf Astoria Orchestra | 2:52 |
| 3. | "You Belong to My Heart (Solamente Una Vez)" (February 11, 1945) | Augustin Lara, Ray Gilbert | Xavier Cugat and His Waldorf Astoria Orchestra | 2:57 |
| 4. | "Baia" (February 11, 1945) | Ary Barroso, Ray Gilbert | Xavier Cugat and His Waldorf Astoria Orchestra | 2:53 |

Side two
| No. | Title | Writer(s) | Performed with | Length |
|---|---|---|---|---|
| 1. | "Allá en el Rancho Grande (My Ranch)" (April 3, 1939) | Emilio D. Uranga, Bartley Costello | John Scott Trotter's Frying Pan Five | 2:21 |
| 2. | "Amor" (February 17, 1944) | Sunny Skylar, Gabriel Ruiz | John Scott Trotter and His Orchestra | 2:35 |
| 3. | "No Te Importe Saber (Let Me Love You Tonight)" (sung in Spanish) (July 8, 1941) | René Touzet, Mitchell Parish | Victor Young and His Orchestra | 2:22 |
| 4. | "Flores Negras (You're the Moment of a Lifetime)" (sung in Spanish) (July 8, 1941) | Sergio De Karlo, Ray Charles, | Victor Young and His Orchestra | 2:37 |
