= Samuel McChord Crothers =

American Unitarian minister

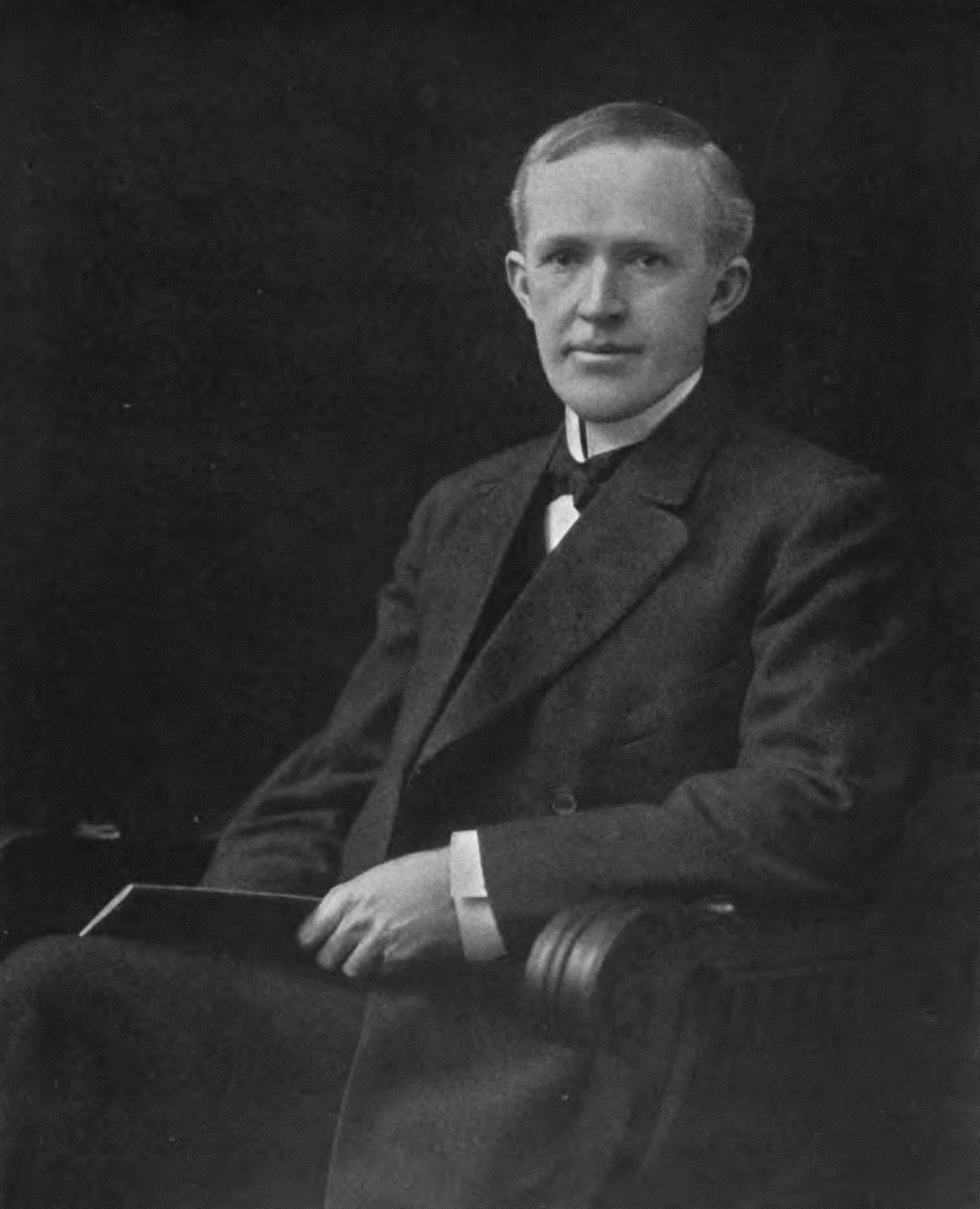
Portrait of Samuel McChord Crothers.

Samuel McChord Crothers (June 7, 1857 in Oswego, Illinois–November 1927) was an American Unitarian minister with The First Parish in Cambridge. He was a popular essayist.

Crothers graduated from Wittenberg College in 1873. In 1874, he graduated from College of New Jersey (later Princeton University). After earning a divinity degree at Union Theological Seminary in 1877, he became a Presbyterian minister. He resigned in 1881 and converted to the Unitarian church in 1882.

Crothers died suddenly at his home in Cambridge, Massachusetts.

== Selected bibliography ==
- The Understanding Heart (1903)
- The Gentle Reader (1903)
- The Pardoner's Wallet (1905)
- By the Christmas Fire (1908)
- On Being a Doctrinaire (1908)
- Oliver Wendell Holmes, the Autocrat and His Fellow-Boarders (1909)
- Among Friends (1910)
- Humanly Speaking (1912)
- Meditations on Votes for Women, etc. (1914): "A contribution to the...literature of feminism" that asks women to be "as modest and unobtrusive as men in expressing their opinions"
- "A Literary Clinic", The Atlantic Monthly, Vol.118, No.3, (September 1916), pp. 291–301 (he coined the term "bibliotherapy" in this article) .
- The Pleasures of an Absentee Landlord (1916)
- The Dame School of Experience (1920)
- Ralph Waldo Emerson: How to Know Him (1921)
- The Cheerful Giver (1923)
- The Children of Dickens (1925)
