= Nathaniel Appleton =

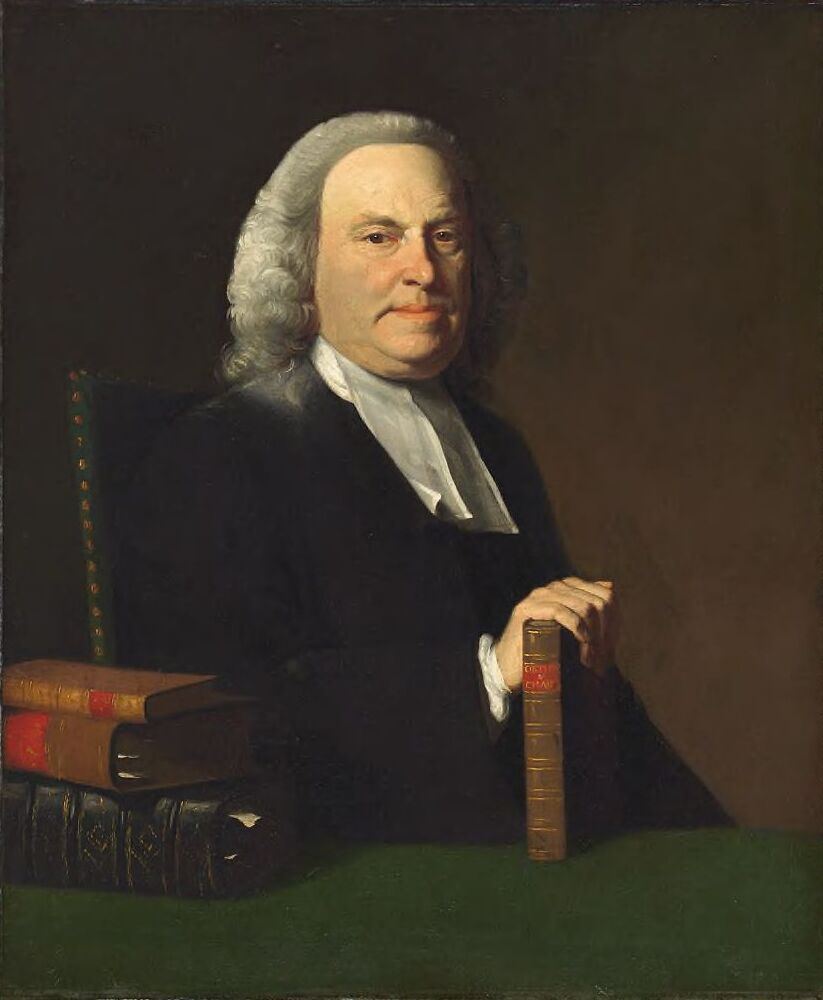
- Portrait by John Singleton Copley, 1759–1761
- Born: 9 December 1693; New York City
- Died: 9 February 1784 (aged 90)
- Occupation: minister

Nathaniel Appleton (9 December 1693 – 9 February 1784) was a Congregational minister in Cambridge, Massachusetts.

Appleton was born in Ipswich, Massachusetts. He was educated at Harvard, taking his degree in 1712, studied theology, and was ordained on October 9, 1717, succeeding William Brattle as Congregational minister in Cambridge. From 1717 to 1779 he was one of the corporation of Harvard University, and in 1771 was granted the degree of D.D. from the university; Harvard had given this degree only once, some eighty years before, to President Mather. In 1729, Appleton was recorded as owning an enslaved man named Pompey. During his long career, Appleton published sermons and occasional discourses, and died, aged 90, in Cambridge, Massachusetts.

Appleton and his son had close ties to present-day Arlington, Massachusetts, then a section of Cambridge known as Menotomy, and according to a local historian the town's Appleton Street was named in their honor. As part of his employment as minister, he was given "a Lott of Land att Menotomy Called Bare Hill, about 40 acres," located near today's Route 2 and the Lexington border, and probably accessed by today's Appleton Street. (His son, also named Nathaniel Appleton, was a businessman who purchased 250 acres for a "country place" in Menotomy, setting out a circle of trees reflected in today's Park Circle. It was the son Nathaniel Appleton, 1731-1798, who wrote Considerations on Slavery (1767)).

== Writings ==
- A Thanksgiving sermon on the total repeal of the Stamp-Act, preached in Cambridge, New-England, May 20th, in the afternoon preceding the public rejoicings of the evening upon that great occasion (Boston: Printed and sold by Edes and Gill, 1766)
- The clearest and surest marks of our being so led by the spirit of God, as to demonstrate that we are the children of God. Set forth in several discourses from Romans VIII. xiv. : Part of which was delivered at the Thursday-lecture in Boston, January 13. 1742, 3. (Boston: Printed by Green, Bushell, and Allen, for D. Henchman in Cornhill, 1743)
- Considerations on slavery. In a letter to a friend. (Boston: Printed and sold by Edes and Gill in Queen-Street, 1767)
- A faithful and wise servant, had in honour, throughout the churches. A discourse occasioned by the much lamented death of the Rev. Edward Wigglesworth, D.D. Hollis professor of divinity in Harvard College, Cambridge; who departed this life, January 16, 1765. in the 73rd year of his age. Having faithfully and laudably discharged the office of professor for more than 42 years. (Printed by Richard and Samuel Draper, and Thomas and John Fleet, 1765)
- Gospel ministers must be fit for the Master's use, and prepared to every good work, if they would be vessels unto honour: illustrated in a sermon preached at Deerfield, August 31. 1735. At the ordination of Mr. John Sargent, to the evangelical ministry, with a special reference to the Indians of Houssatonnoc, who have lately manifested their desires to receive the Gospel (Boston: Printed and sold by S. Kneeland & T. Green, in Queen-Street., MDCCXXXV. [1735])
- How God wills the salvation of all men; and their coming to the knowledge of the truth, as the means thereof. Illustrated in a sermon from I. Tim. ii. 4. Preached in Boston, March 27. 1753. at the ordination of the Rev. Mr. Stephen Badger, as a missionary with a special reference to the Indians at Natick. : Published at the unanimous desire of the ecclesiastical council convened on that occasion; and of other hearers. (Boston: Printed and sold by S. Kneeland Queen-Street, 1753)
- The origin of war examin'd and applied, in a sermon preached at the desire of the Honourable Artillery Company in Boston, June 4. 1733. Being the day of their election of officers. (Boston: Printed by T. Fleet, for Daniel Henchman, over-against the Brick Meeting-House in Cornhill, 1733)
- A sermon preached May 6, 1767. At the ordination of the Reverend Simeon Howard, M.A. to the pastoral care of the West-Church in Boston. To which the charge, and right-hand of fellowship, delivered upon the same occasion, are added. (Boston: Printed by R. Draper, Edes & Gill, and T. & J. Fleet., 1767)
- A sermon preached October 9 being a day of public thanksgiving occasioned by the surrender of Montreal and all Canada, September 8th, 1760 to his Britannic Majesty effected by the British and provincial troops under command of General Amherst (Printed by John Draper, 1760)
- The servant's actual readiness for the coming of his Lord, described, and recommended. In two discourses preached at Lexington, December 17th. 1752. Being the Lord's Day after the funeral of their late venerable and aged pastor, the Reverend Mr. John Hancock, who going to bed as well as usual the night after the 5th of December, and awaking some time after midnight with a great pain in his stomach, died in a few minutes. In the 82d year of his age, and 54th of his ministry (Boston: Printed by S. Kneeland, 1753)
- Some unregenerate persons not so far from the Kingdom of God as others. Illustrated in a sermon from Mark XII. 34. Preached some time past at the Thursday lecture in Boston (Boston: Printed and sold by S. Kneeland in Queen-Street., M,DCC,LXIII. [1763])
- Superiour skill and wisdom necessary for winning souls, which is the grand design of the ministerial office, illustrated in a sermon preached at the ordination of the Reverend Mr. John Sparhawk, to the pastoral office over a church of Christ in Salem; on the eighth day of December, 1736 (Boston: Printed and sold by Kneeland and Green, in Queenstreet,, MDCCXXXVII. [1737])
- A thanksgiving sermon on the total repeal of the Stamp-act. Preached in Cambridge, New-England, May 20th, in the afternoon preceding the public rejoicings of the evening upon that great occasion (Boston: Printed and sold by Edes and Gill, in Queen-Street,, 1766)
- When the godly cease, and faithful fail; we must seek to God for help. A sermon preach'd at Cambridge, upon the death of the Reverend Mr. Benjamin Wadsworth, president of Harvard College. Who deceas'd, March 16th. 1736,7. Aetatis suae 68. (Boston: : Printed by S. Kneeland & T. Green, for D. Henchman in Corn-Hill., MDCCXXXVII. [1737])
- The wisdom of God in the redemption of fallen man, illustrated in several discourses, from Eph. I. viii. (Printed by B. Green, for D. Henchman, at his Shop in Corn-Hill., 1728)
- The wisdom of God in the redemption of fallen man, illustrated in several dscourses, from Eph. I. viii. (Boston in N.E. : Printed by B. Green, for D. Henchman, at his shop in Cornhill., 1728)

== See also ==
- The First Parish in Cambridge
