= Selections from Welcome Stranger =

Studio album by Bing Crosby
- Released: Original 78 album: 1947
- Recorded: November 1946
- Genre: Popular
- Length: 11:36
- Label: Decca

Bing Crosby chronology
Cowboy Songs, Vol. One (1947)	Selections from Welcome Stranger (1947)	Our Common Heritage (1947)

Selections from Welcome Stranger is the fifth solo studio album by American singer and actor Bing Crosby, released in 1947 as a Phonograph record of songs featured in his film Welcome Stranger. All of the songs were written by Jimmy Van Heusen (music) and Johnny Burke (lyrics).

== Reception ==
Billboard magazine said Crosby "emphasises the hit quality of the score's ballad song, "As Long As I'm Dreaming". Other songs have only production value, Crosby singing it in easy and rhythmic style for "Smile Right Back at the Sun" and "My Heart Is a Hobo". And with the Calico Kids on the chant, Crosby is also the caller for the country style square dance ditty."

Down Beat was positive:

Better sides than Bing has made in a long while. Sounds if he actually felt like singing. In 'Style' it's mostly his engaging half-singing manner that sneaks him through the by now apparent faults in his upper tones - and it's a square dance too.

== Track listing ==
These songs were featured on a 2-disc, 78 rpm album set, Decca Album No. A-531.

Side / Title	Recording date	Performed with	Time
Disc 1 (23848):
A. "As Long As I'm Dreaming"	November 14, 1946	John Scott Trotter and His Orchestra	3:07
B. "Smile Right Back at the Sun"	November 14, 1946	John Scott Trotter and His Orchestra	2:41
Disc 2 (23849):
A. "Country Style (Square Dance)"	November 19, 1946	The Calico Kids and John Scott Trotter and His Orchestra	3:13
B. "My Heart Is a Hobo"	November 19, 1946	John Scott Trotter and His Orchestra	2:35
