= Old Ironsides (poem) =

Poetic tribute to USS Constitution by Oliver Wendell Holmes

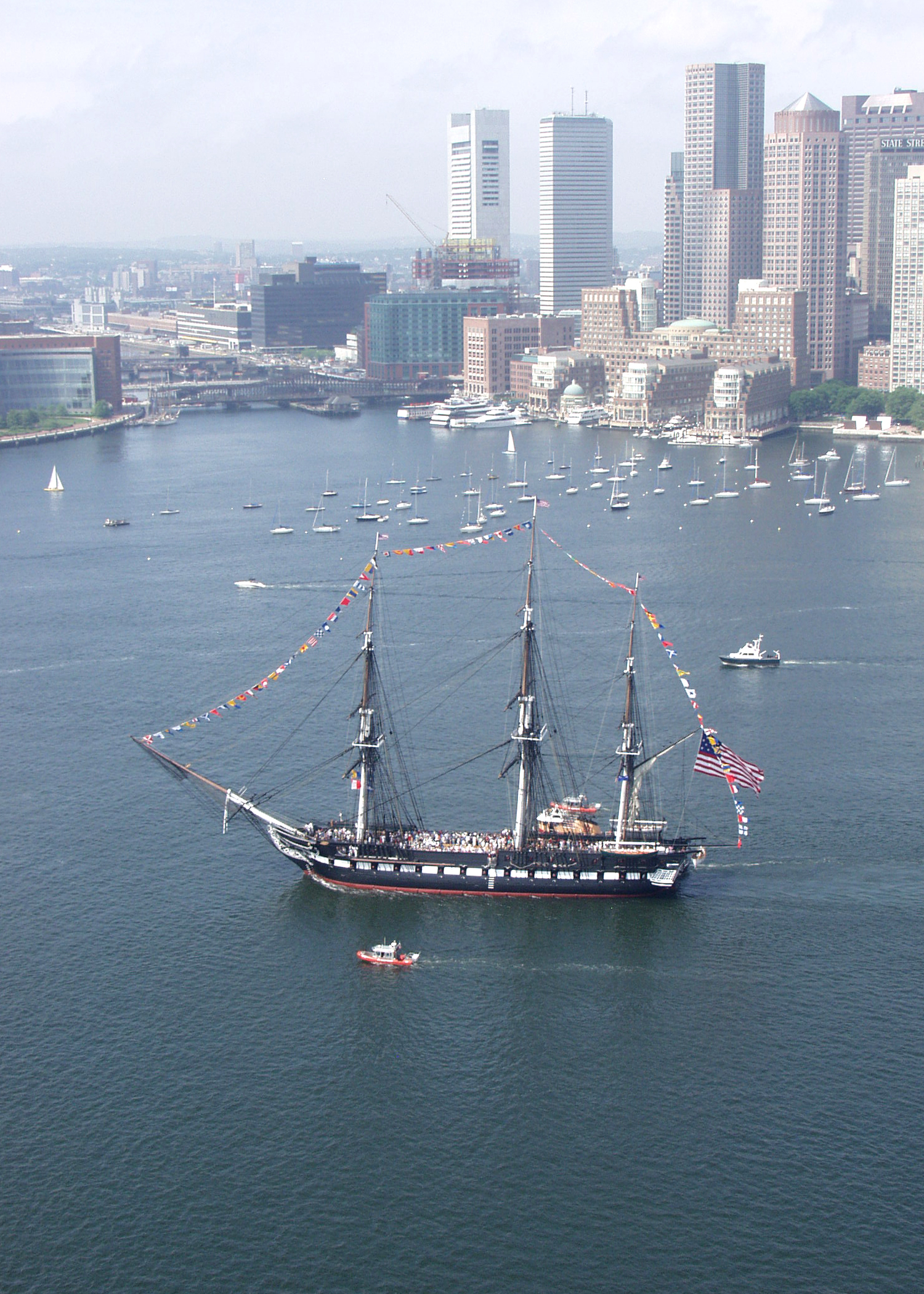
USS Constitution in Boston, 2005

"Old Ironsides" is a poem written by American writer Oliver Wendell Holmes Sr. on September 16, 1830, as a tribute to the 18th-century USS Constitution. The poem was one reason that the frigate was saved from being decommissioned, and it is now the oldest commissioned ship in the world that is still afloat.

Old Ironsides

Aye, tear her tattered ensign down!
Long has it waved on high,
And many an eye has danced to see
That banner in the sky;
Beneath it rung the battle shout,
And burst the cannon's roar;—
The meteor of the ocean air
Shall sweep the clouds no more.

Her deck, once red with heroes' blood,
Where knelt the vanquished foe,
When winds were hurrying o'er the flood,
And waves were white below,
No more shall feel the victor's tread,
Or know the conquered knee;—
The harpies of the shore shall pluck
The eagle of the sea!

Oh, better that her shattered hulk
Should sink beneath the wave;
Her thunders shook the mighty deep,
And there should be her grave;
Nail to the mast her holy flag,
Set every threadbare sail,
And give her to the god of storms,
The lightning and the gale!

== Background ==
"Old Ironsides" was the nickname given to the 18th-century frigate, USS Constitution during the War of 1812 after its naval battle with HMS Guerriere. Constitution was one of the original six frigates of the United States Navy, commissioned by the Naval Act of 1794. It was the third of four ships with 44 guns and was granted its name by President George Washington. The ship saw action during the Quasi-War, the First Barbary War, the Battle of Tripoli Harbor, and the Battle of Derne before it earned the famous nickname during the War of 1812. It was nicknamed this because the live oak wood with which the ship was made was so strong that the 18-pound British cannonballs bounced right off the hull.

== Composition and publication history ==
Holmes had recently abandoned his studies of law and began writing poetry for fun. In September 1830, he read an article in the Boston Daily Advertiser about the Navy's plans to dismantle the historic USS Constitution. Startled, he was moved to write "Old Ironsides" to express his opposition to the scrapping. The poem was published in the Advertiser the next day and was soon reprinted by papers in New York, Philadelphia, and Washington.

== Response ==
The poem brought Holmes immediate national attention, and the poem would remain among his best-known. Also, the poem generated enough public sentiment that the historic ship was preserved though plans to do so may have already been in motion. Today, Constitution is well known by its nickname "Old Ironsides" and is the oldest commissioned ship in the world that is still afloat.
