= National Register of Historic Places listings in Clayton County, Georgia =

This is a list of properties and districts in Clayton County, Georgia that are listed on the National Register of Historic Places (NRHP).

This National Park Service list is complete through NPS recent listings posted March 21, 2025.

== Current listings ==
	Name on the Register	Image	Date listed	Location	City or town	Description
1	Crawford-Dorsey House and Cemetery	Crawford-Dorsey House and Cemetery	July 5, 1984 (#84000972)	Freeman and McDonough Rds. 33°27′11″N 84°18′45″W	Lovejoy	House burned in 1984
2	Jonesboro Historic District	Jonesboro Historic District	January 20, 1972 (#72000381)	GA 54 and 3; 33°31′26″N 84°21′15″W	Jonesboro	
3	Orkin Early Quartz Site		December 4, 1974 (#74000671)	Address Restricted	Fayetteville	
4	Rex Mill	Rex Mill	March 7, 1979 (#79000712)	Rex Rd. 33°35′36″N 84°16′07″W	Rex	
5	Stately Oaks	Stately Oaks	March 16, 1972 (#72000382)	100 Carriage Lane (Jodeco Rd. on NRHP form); 33°30′55″N 84°21′02″W	Jonesboro	Open for tours
