= National Register of Historic Places listings in Pike County, Georgia =

Location of Pike County in Georgia

This is a list of properties and districts in Pike County, Georgia that are listed on the National Register of Historic Places (NRHP).

This National Park Service list is complete through NPS recent listings posted March 21, 2025.

== Current listings ==
| | Name on the Register | Image | Date listed | Location | City or town | Description |
|---|---|---|---|---|---|---|
| 1 | William Barker Whiskey Bonding Barn | William Barker Whiskey Bonding Barn | May 12, 2008 (#08000396) | 9450 Old Zebulon Rd. 33°00′51″N 84°28′05″W | Molena | |
| 2 | New Hebron Baptist Church | New Hebron Baptist Church | April 24, 2017 (#100000906) | 570 New Hebron Church Rd. 33°06′06″N 84°29′24″W | Concord | |
| 3 | Pike County Courthouse | Pike County Courthouse | September 18, 1980 (#80001222) | Courthouse Sq. 33°06′08″N 84°20′32″W | Zebulon | |
| 4 | R. F. Strickland Company | R. F. Strickland Company | August 26, 1982 (#82002458) | Railroad and McLendon Sts. 33°05′28″N 84°26′22″W | Concord | |

== See also ==
- National Register of Historic Places listings in Georgia
- List of National Historic Landmarks in Georgia (U.S. state)
