= Johnson County Courthouse (Georgia) =

Historic courthouse in the US

- U.S. National Register of Historic Places
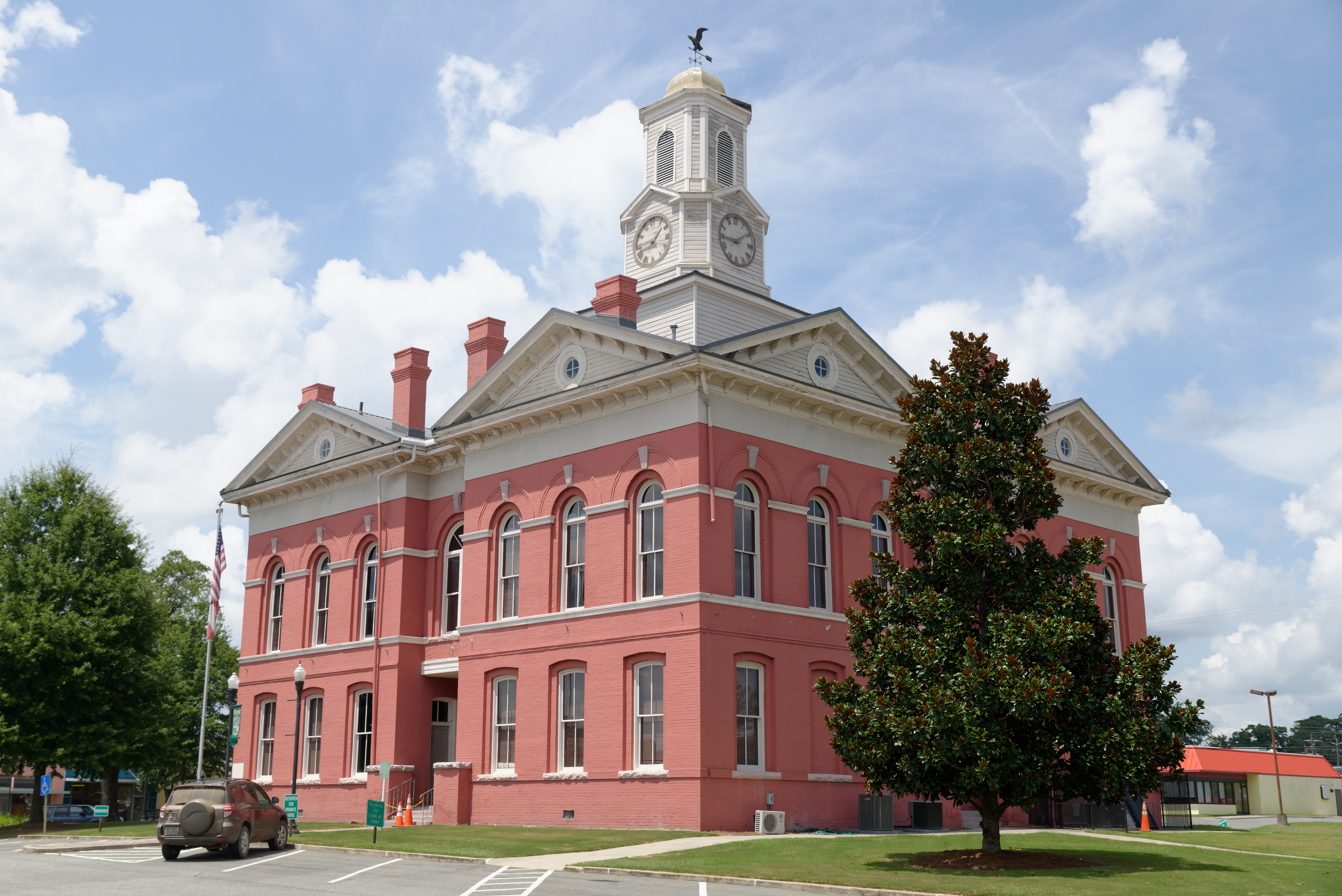

- Location within Georgia Location within the United States
- Location: Courthouse Sq., Wrightsville, Georgia
- Coordinates: 32°43′48″N 82°43′9″W
- Area: 2.5 acres (1.0 ha)
- Built: 1895; 1940
- Built by: Wagner & Gorenflo
- Architect: Golucke & Stewart
- Architectural style: Romanesque
- MPS: Georgia County Courthouses TR
- NRHP reference No.: 80001101
- Added to NRHP: September 18, 1980

The Johnson County Courthouse in Wrightsville, Georgia was built in 1895 and work was done on it in 1940 under the Works Projects Administration. It was listed on the National Register of Historic Places in 1980.

It stands on the town square in Wrightsville. It was designed by architects Golucke & Stewart and is similar to their Pike County Courthouse. It is brick and stone trim in composition. It has entrances on all four sides, with no one prominent enough to be clearly a "front" entrance. It has four corner pavilions, each with a bracketed gable. A later addition is the pedimented clock tower that is topped by a small dome.
