= R. F. Strickland Company =

- U.S. National Register of Historic Places
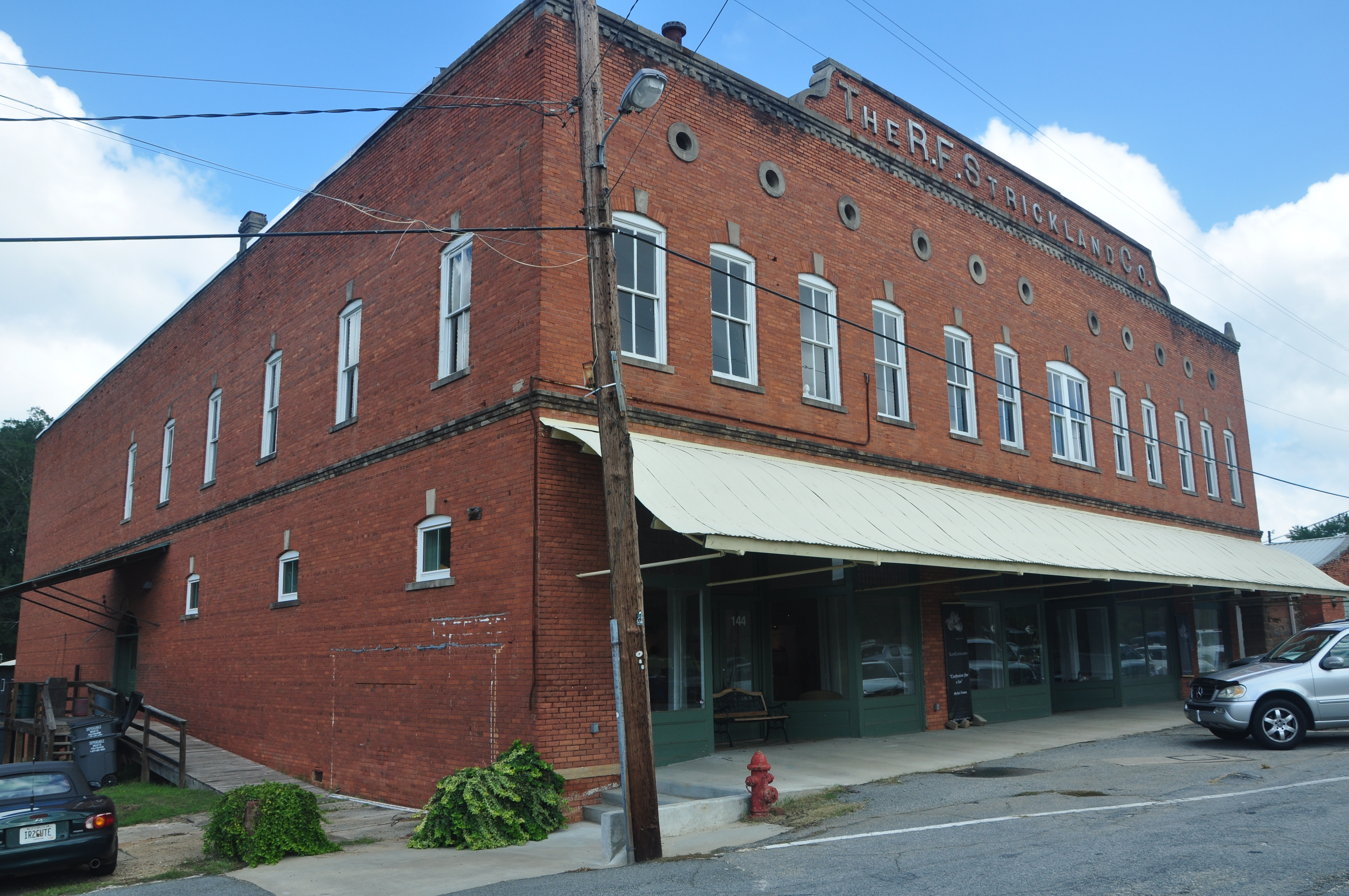

- Location within Georgia
- Location: Railroad and McLendon Sts., Concord, Georgia
- Coordinates: 33°5′28″N 84°26′22″W
- Area: 3 acres (1.2 ha)
- Built: 1907
- Built by: Gresham Manufacturing Co.
- NRHP reference No.: 82002458
- Added to NRHP: August 26, 1982

R. F. Strickland Company is a historic general store business in Concord, Georgia. The company's records from 1887 to 1914 are held by Emory University. It was added to the National Register of Historic Places on August 26, 1982. It is located at Railroad Street and McLendon Street.

The building was the center of the Strickland company empire, consisting of Strickland family farms and over three hundred tenant farms on, at one time, over 30,000 acres (12,000 ha) of land.

== See also ==
- National Register of Historic Places listings in Pike County, Georgia
