= Jones County Courthouse =

Jones County Courthouse may refer to:

- Jones County Courthouse (Georgia), Gray, Georgia
- Jones County Courthouse (Iowa), Anamosa, Iowa
- Jones County Courthouse (Mississippi), Ellisville, Mississippi, listed on the National Register of Historic Places (NRHP)
- Jones County Courthouse (Texas), Anson, Texas, listed on the NRHP
