= Pickens County Courthouse =

Pickens County Courthouse may refer to:

- Pickens County Courthouse (Alabama), Carrollton, Alabama
- Pickens County Courthouse (Georgia), Jasper, Georgia
- Pickens County Courthouse (South Carolina) Pickens, South Carolina
