= Griffeth =

Griffeth is a surname. Notable people with the surname include:

- Bill Griffeth (born 1956), American financial journalist
- Lee Griffeth (1925–2007), American baseball player
- Nancy D. Griffeth (born 1945), American computer scientist
- Simone Griffeth (born 1950), American actress

== See also ==
- Griffeth-Pendley House, historic house in Jasper, Georgia, U.S.
