= Main Street Historic District (Tuskegee, Alabama) =

- U.S. National Register of Historic Places
- U.S. Historic district
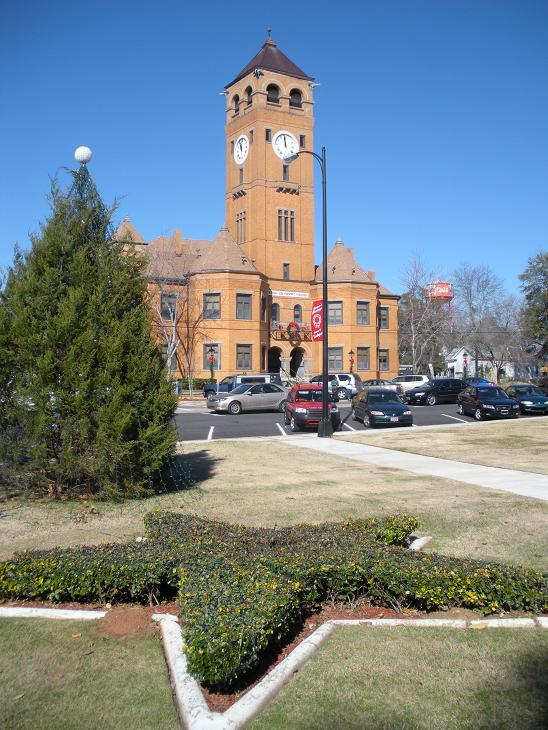
- Macon County Courthouse from Tuskegee Square

- Location within Alabama
- Location: Main St., Tuskegee, Alabama
- Coordinates: 32°25′26.36″N 85°41′27.03″W
- Area: 70 acres (28 ha)
- Architectural style: Greek Revival, Tudor Revival, Bungalow
- NRHP reference No.: 84000650
- Added to NRHP: March 12, 1984

The Main Street Historic District comprises the commercial and governmental core of Tuskegee, Alabama. The historic district includes more than one hundred contributing structures along a ten-block by three-block stretch of North and South Main Street.

== Description ==
The district is roughly centered on the Macon County Courthouse and Tuskegee Square. The square was the location of the first three county courthouses. The current courthouse is listed on the National Register of Historic Places on its own, and as a contributing feature to the historic district. It is sited on the northeast side of the square. The district contains a mix of governmental, commercial, ecclesiastical, and residential buildings. Commercial and government buildings range from the late 19th century and early 20th century. About a quarter of residential structures date to the early 19th century, and about half from the late 19th century. A number of these building express Greek Revival and Romanesque Revival features. The district includes 131 contributing structures, and about 30 non-contributing structures.

Tuskegee Square is centered on the Tuskegee Confederate Monument, which has been a focus of civil rights demonstrations since 1966.

A commercial building on the square at 101 Westside Street was built with help from students from the Tuskegee Institute, and was used for classes taught by Olivia A. Davidson, second wife of Booker T. Washington, while she assisted Washington in the establishment of the institute.

The Main Street Historic District was placed on the National Register of Historic Places on March 12, 1984.
