= Pickens County Courthouse (Georgia) =

Historic courthouse in Georgia, US

- U.S. National Register of Historic Places
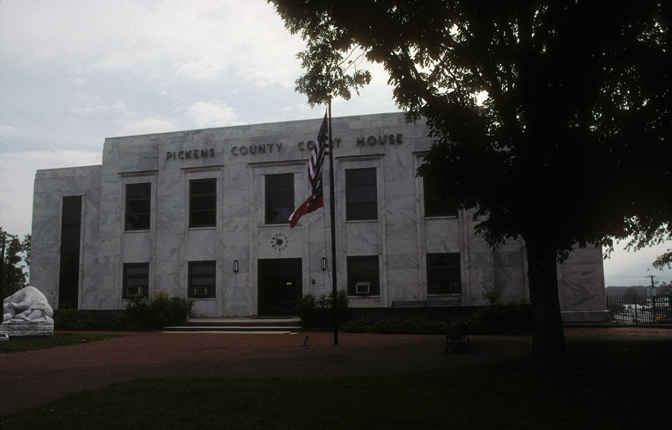
- Pickens County Courthouse, photograph by Calvin Beale

- Location within Georgia Location within the United States
- Location: 50 N. Main St., Jasper, Georgia
- Coordinates: 34.46922°N 84.4298°W
- Area: 0.5 acres (0.20 ha)
- NRHP reference No.: 08000352
- Added to NRHP: April 29, 2008

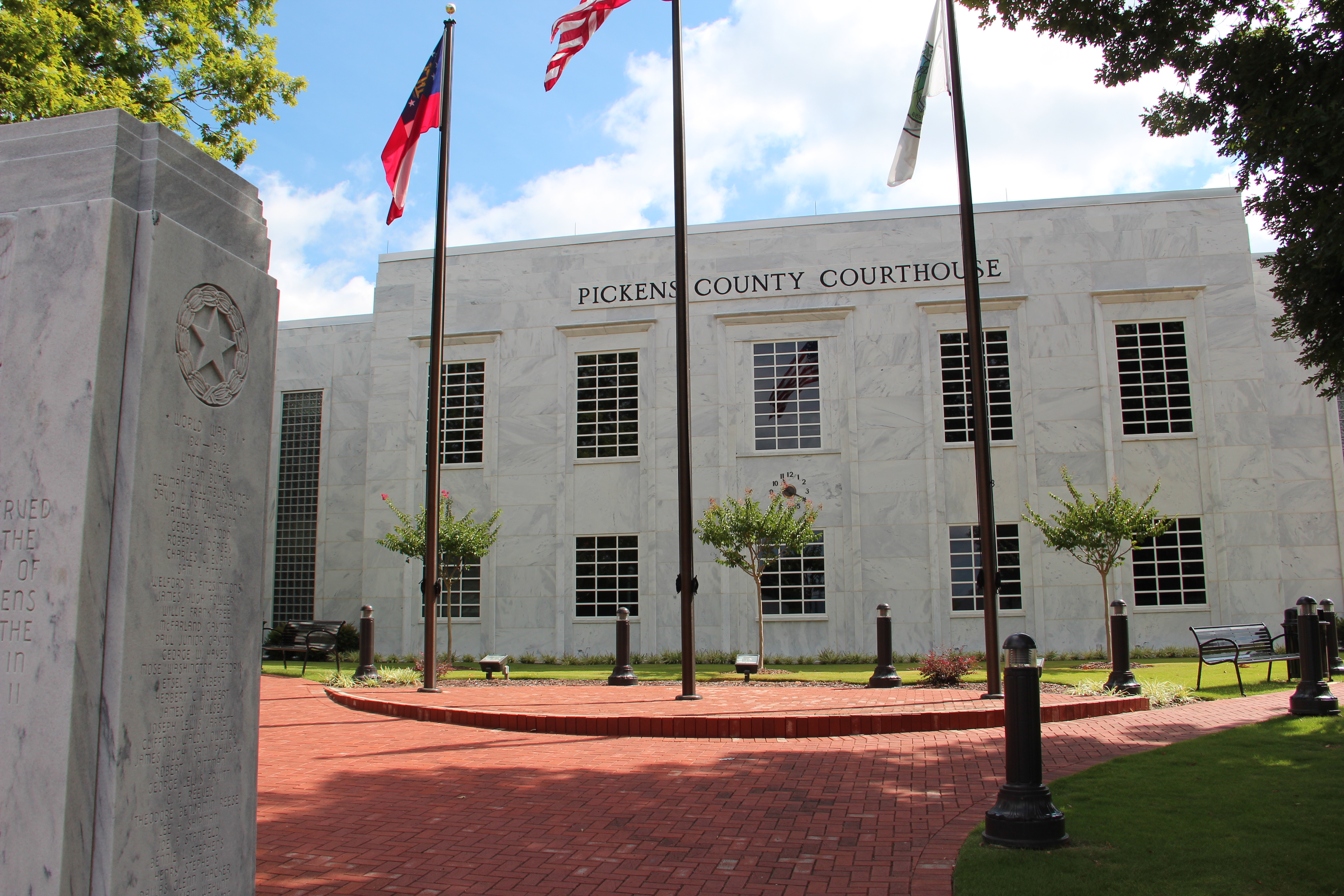
Courthouse

Pickens County Courthouse is a historic courthouse in Jasper, Georgia, the county seat of Pickens County, Georgia. It was designed by Bothwell & Nash and built in 1949. The exterior includes marble from Tate, Georgia. It was added to the National Register of Historic Places on April 29, 2008. It is located at 50 North Main Street.

== Website ==
https://pickensgacourts.org/

== See also ==
- National Register of Historic Places listings in Pickens County, Georgia
