= Pickens County Jail =

- U.S. National Register of Historic Places
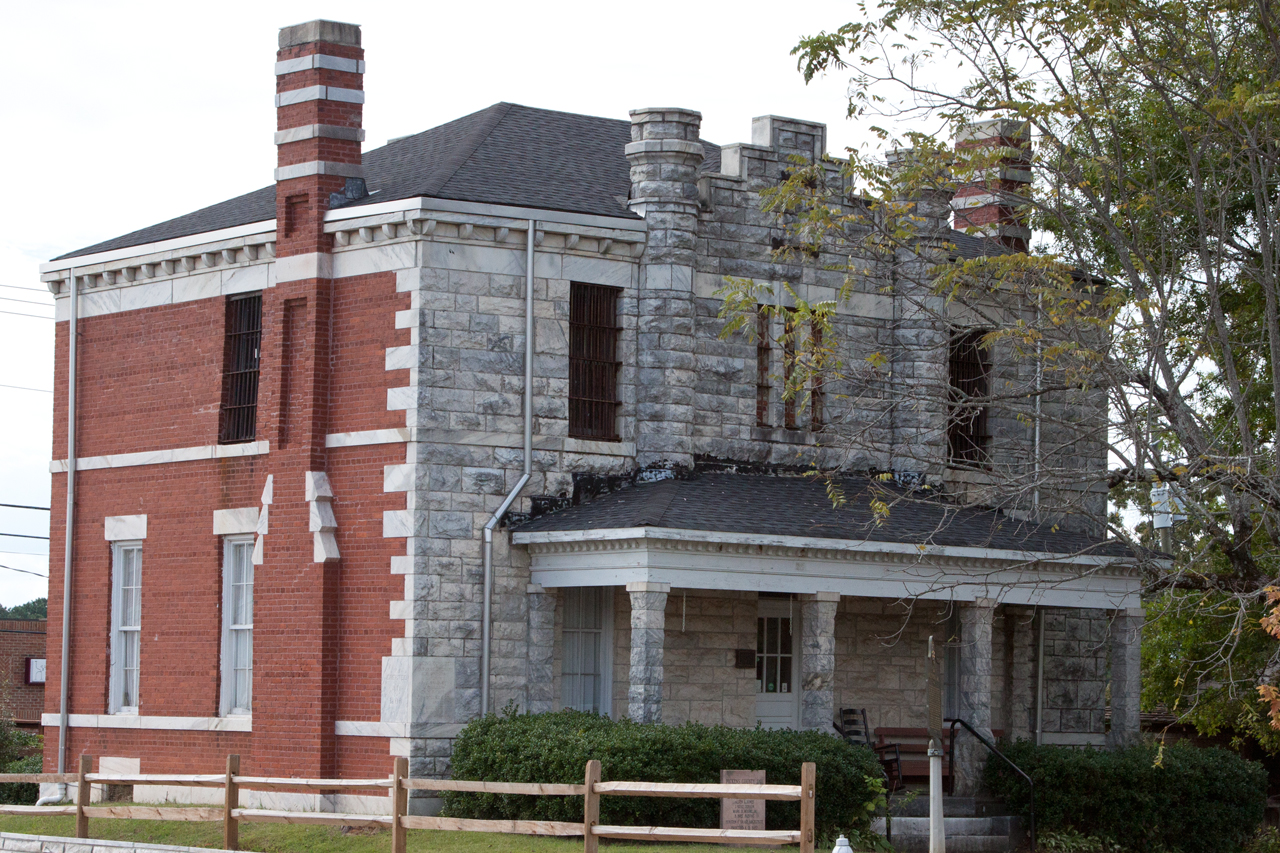

- Location within Georgia
- Location: N. Main St., Jasper, Georgia
- Coordinates: 34°28′10″N 84°25′52″W
- Area: less than one acre
- Built: 1907
- Architect: James W. Golucke
- NRHP reference No.: 84001218
- Added to NRHP: January 12, 1984

Pickens County Jail is a historic jail building in Jasper, Georgia. It was added to the National Register of Historic Places on January 12, 1984. It is located on North Main Street.

It was designed by Atlanta architect James W. Golucke. Jail cells were provided by Pauly Jail Company of St. Louis, Missouri.

It is a two-story, brick and marble building. Its marble facade, marble porch columns, and turrets are done in a rusticated style. It was deemed notable as a county jail building somewhat unusual for its incorporation of local marble into its construction.

== See also ==
- National Register of Historic Places listings in Pickens County, Georgia
