= Coweta County Courthouse =

Historic courthouse in the U.S.

- U.S. National Register of Historic Places
- U.S. Historic district – Contributing property
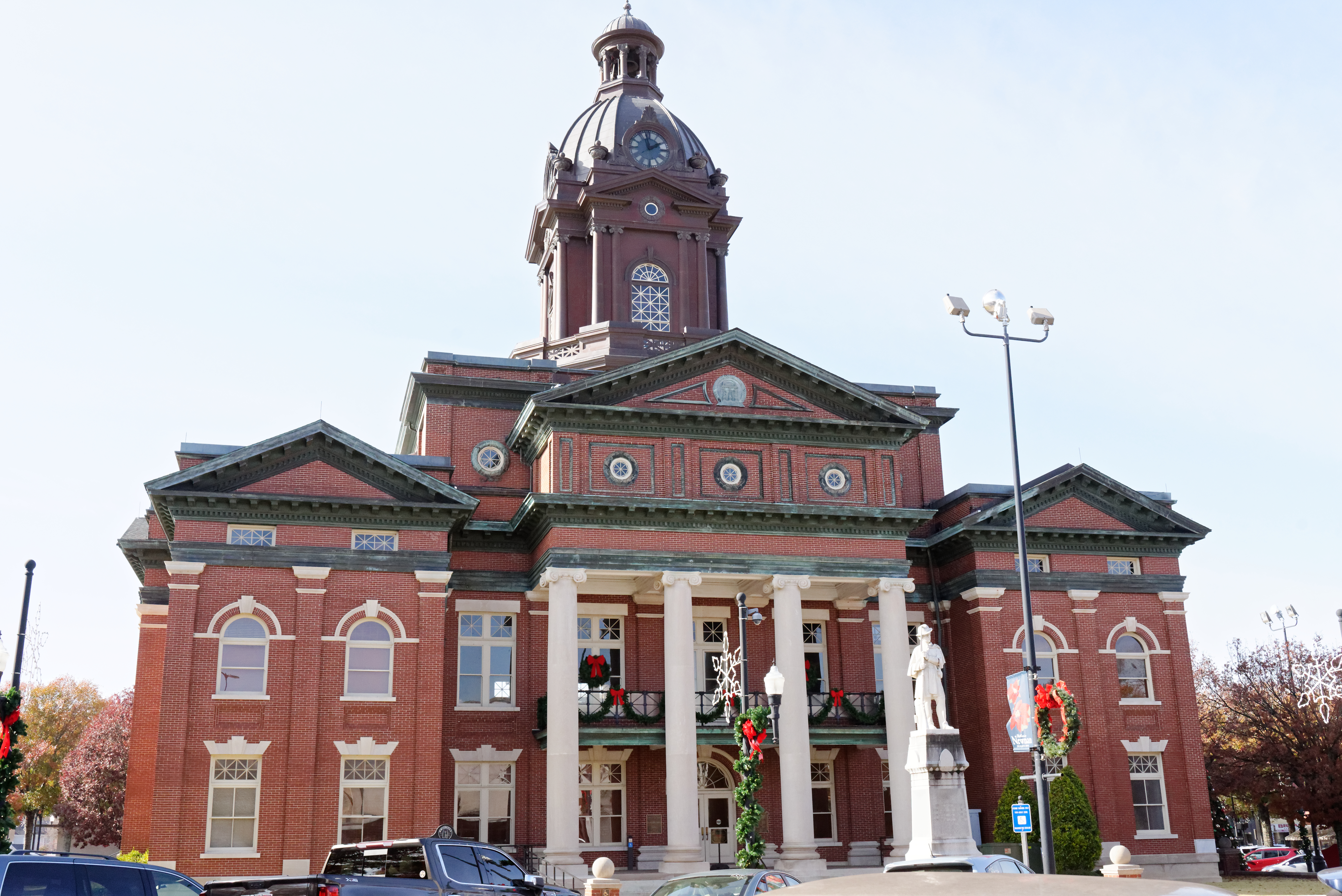

- Location within Georgia Location within the United States
- Interactive map showing the location of Coweta County Courthouse
- Location: Newnan, Georgia
- Coordinates: 33°22′29″N 84°48′1″W
- Area: 1 acre (0.40 ha)
- Built: 1904
- Architect: James W. Golucke
- Architectural style: Classical Revival
- Part of: Newnan Commercial Historic District
- MPS: Georgia County Courthouses TR
- NRHP reference No.: 80001006
- Added to NRHP: September 18, 1980

The Coweta County Courthouse is a historic government building located at Courthouse Square in the U.S. city of Newnan, Georgia, the seat of Coweta County. It was constructed in 1904, and is located along Broad Street to the south, Jefferson Street (northbound US 27 ALT/US 29) to the east, Washington Street to the north and LaGrange Street (southbound US 27 ALT/US 29) to the west.

The building was added to the National Register of Historic Places in 1980. It is also a contributing property to the Newnan Commercial Historic District

It is a Classical Revival-style building designed by architect James W. Golucke. It has an Ionic tetrastyle main entrance and Ionic di-style side entrances, all with full entablatures and pediments. It has stamped copper cornices and dome. Its walls are a dark brick laid in Flemish bond.

The courthouse was renovated in 1975.

== See also ==
- Coweta County, Georgia
- Newnan, Georgia
