= National Register of Historic Places listings in Pickens County, Georgia =

This is a list of properties and districts in Pickens County, Georgia that are listed on the National Register of Historic Places (NRHP).

This National Park Service list is complete through NPS recent listings posted March 21, 2025.

== Current listings ==
	Name on the Register	Image	Date listed	Location	City or town	Description
1	Cagle House	Cagle House	March 20, 2002 (#02000191)	GA 108, approx. 1 1/2 mi. W of GA 5/515; 34°23′24″N 84°26′08″W	Tate	The Cagle House is a rare surviving example of a two-story I-house in a rural setting found in the Highlands region of North Georgia. Peter Cagle (the younger b. 1844) and wife, Martha Emeline Carpenter, built their house in c. 1872 with the assistance of Peter's brothers and their father, Martin.
2	Georgia Marble Company and Tate Historic District	Georgia Marble Company and Tate Historic District	June 10, 2005 (#05000644)	Centered on GA 53 bet GA 5 and Long Swamp Creek; 34°24′40″N 84°23′04″W	Tate	
3	Griffeth-Pendley House	Griffeth-Pendley House	April 16, 2008 (#08000293)	2198 Cove Rd. 34°27′46″N 84°23′30″W	Jasper	
4	Pickens County Courthouse	Pickens County Courthouse	April 29, 2008 (#08000352)	50 N. Main St. 34°28′09″N 84°25′47″W	Jasper	
5	Pickens County Jail	Pickens County Jail	January 12, 1984 (#84001218)	N. Main St. 34°28′10″N 84°25′52″W	Jasper	
6	Tate Gymnasium	Tate Gymnasium	December 12, 2002 (#02001493)	5600 GA 53 E 34°25′04″N 84°22′51″W	Tate	
7	Tate House	Tate House	May 17, 1974 (#74000700)	E of Tate on Hwy. 53; 34°24′49″N 84°22′20″W	Tate	
