= Beale code =

American classification of geography

In geography and demography, a Beale code is the Rural-Urban Continuum Coding system originally developed by David L. Brown and later popularized by Calvin Beale at the United States Department of Agriculture in 1975. The Beale code system now is used by many other countries, such as Canada.
