= Cagle House =

Historic house in Georgia, United States

- The Cagle House
- U.S. National Register of Historic Places
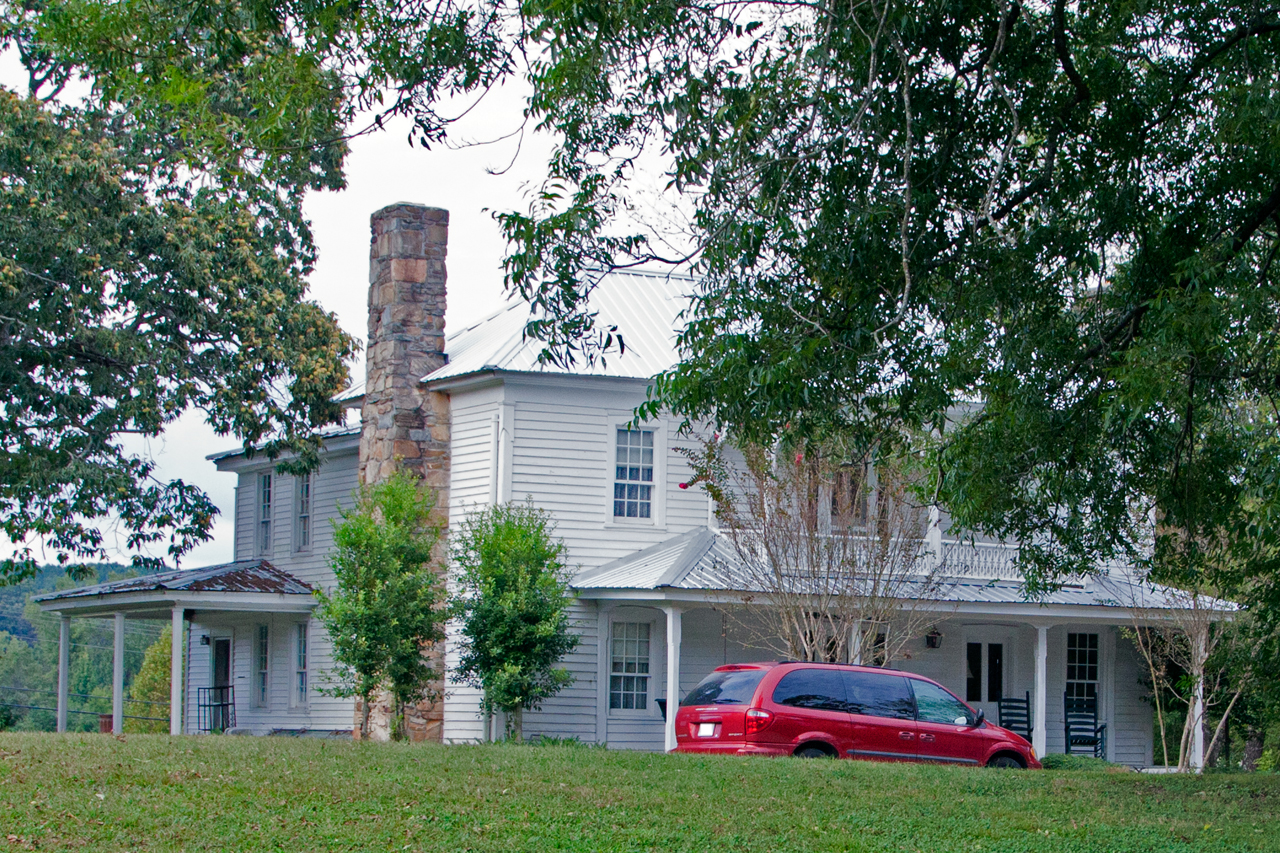

- Location within Georgia Location within the United States
- Nearest city: Tate, Georgia
- Coordinates: 34°23′24″N 84°26′8″W
- Area: 2 acres (0.81 ha)
- Built: c. 1871
- Built by: Peter Cagle
- Architectural style: I-house
- NRHP reference No.: 02000191
- Added to NRHP: March 20, 2002

The Cagle House is a historic house in an area known as Cagletown, Jasper, Georgia, United States. It was added to the National Register of Historic Places on March 20, 2002. It is located on Waleska Highway 108, approximately 1 1/2 miles west of Georgia 5/515.

It was built c. 1872 as an I-house by Peter Cagle, the younger (b. 1844) and wife, Martha Emeline Carpenter with the assistance of Peter's brothers and their father, Martin. It was modified in the 1930s. It was moved about 75 feet (23 m) back from the road in the 1980s, restoring setback lost when the road was widened.

== History ==
Located in south central Pickens County just north of the Cherokee County line, the Cagle House was built in 1871 by Peter Cagle. In 1839, Peter (b. 1775), hereafter referred to as "the elder," and Rachel Cagle migrated from Moore County, North Carolina, to Cherokee County, Georgia, with their four adult children. The Cagle migration was originally intended to continue to Mississippi where the family planned to purchase land and farm cotton, but the Cagles remained in Georgia after spending the winter of 1839–1840 in Cherokee County. There they were employed at Keith Plantation completing work on the plantation house and building furniture. Peter and Rachel Cagle's youngest child, twenty-three year old Martin Cagle (b. 1816), brought his wife Mary O'Brien Cagle (b. 1817) and one- year-old son John with him from North Carolina and settled with other family members on Hickory Log Creek in Cherokee County just north of Canton. Martin worked as a blacksmith, cabinet maker and carpenter, and with his wife raised a family of eleven children (John M., b. 1838, William, b.1840, Lutisha, b. 1842, Peter, b. 1844, Levi, b. 1847, Francis M., b. 1849, Loucinda, b. 1852, Lorinda, b. 1854, Nancy, b. 1855, Mary M., b. 1857, and Fanny I., b. 1859), all of whom, with the exception of eldest son John, were born in Cherokee County between 1840 and 1859.

Martin Cagle's four oldest sons (John, William, Peter and Levi) initially claimed conscientious objector status during the Civil War, and as an alternative to serving in the Confederate Army were permitted to work in an iron factory at Lost Town in Cherokee County. When this facility was burned by Sherman's troops, the brothers were advised that they would be given no protection from the Pro- Southern McCollum's Raiders, a terrorist band that robbed and often killed Union sympathizers in Cherokee and nearby counties. John, William, Peter and Levi Cagle, and brother-in-law Zach T. Evans, therefore joined the Union Army and sought protection by moving to Cartersville until the end of the war. Within a few years the brothers began acquiring land in Pickens County, which had voted against secession. Peter Cagle, here after referred to as "the younger," married Martha Emeline Carpenter on December 29, 1870.

In May 1869, brothers John M. and William Cagle acquired 260 acres of land in south central Pickens County from the estate auction of William J. Nelson. Both men moved to Pickens County sometime during 1869, as they are listed in the 1870 census. In February 1871, Peter and Levi Cagle purchased 130 acres of land from Abraham Crow located just to the west of that previously acquired by their brothers. The Cagle House was built c.1871 by Peter Cagle (the younger) with the assistance of his brothers who were all trained as carpenters as was their father, Martin. That the Cagle House is two stories in height was unusual as Peter Cagle's brothers all built themselves one- story dwellings. The account passed down through the Cagle family is that Peter was trying to impress his father-in-law who owned a large two-story house in Cherokee County. Martin Cagle remained in Cherokee County at least until 1870, as he is listed in the census as residing in Cherokee County that year, but he and his fifth son, Frances M. Cagle, (b. 1849), joined the other four sons in Pickens County in the early 1870s and helped settle the area that soon became known as Cagletown.

Peter Cagle (the younger) undertook a fairly diverse variety of farming, as did his four brothers. All acquired additional lands during the 1870s and 1880s, and according to the 1880 census Peter owned a total of 105 acres that year. He had 45 improved acres in 1880, on which he produced 200 bushels of corn, 110 bushels of wheat, 50 bushels of apples and four bales of cotton. He also was recorded as owning 20 chickens, 10 swine, six sheep, two head of cattle and one milk cow, and cut 15 cords of wood on his property. This level and type of production is similar to that of the other four Cagle brothers in 1880, and that year the five brothers together owned a total of 629 acres, all in south central Pickens County. They would eventually own more than 1,000 acres in the Cagletown area.

It is difficult to isolate the agricultural and business activities conducted at the various Cagle properties, for the brothers worked together and for all practical purposes functioned as a team in their various undertakings. One of the most important components of those endeavors was Cagle's Mill, located on Sharp Mountain Creek on the property initially purchased by John and William Cagle in 1869. The site became a complex that included a gristmill, saw mill, cotton gin and distillery, which was operated for several years through a license with the Federal government. The Cagles ground mash at their gristmill and produced whiskey that was usually sold in Atlanta. This venture was important to the Cagles for bringing in cash that was used primarily for the acquisition of additional land in the area. Peter Cagle is believed to have owned a greater percentage of the distillery than did his brothers. Remains of the mill complex, located approximately a mile southeast of the Cagle House, are still visible on Sharp Mountain Creek.

Peter and Martha Cagle had eleven children, although two died at birth. Their first child, Lewis M. Cagle, was born on October 30, 1871, while their last child, Peter S. Cagle, was born on May 12, 1893, only two years before his father's death. It is therefore likely that all of Peter and Martha Cagle's children, with the possible exception of Lewis, were born in the Cagle House. In 1908 Martin Cicero Cagle, the third son of Peter and Martha, re-acquired his father's property. During the early decades of the twentieth century, the agricultural and business activities at the Cagle House property remained diverse. Martin Cicero Cagle planted cotton and also grew corn and peas and had a variety of animals. The Cagle brothers operated a "shop" on the opposite side of the road from the house, and this facility was used for blacksmithing work, woodworking and automobile repair. The Cagles were some of the earliest auto repairmen in the area and were known for being able to service the first Model Ts. Cagle Mill continued to operate during this time as well. Martin also worked for a time at the Georgia Marble Company in nearby Tate. In the 1940s the Cagles became some of the first farmers in Pickens County to become involved with poultry production, and to this day several members of the Cagle family remain active in the industry.

Martin Cicero Cagle married Annie Townsend and the couple had eight children. Annie died in 1924 and Martin Cicero married Alice Barnett two years later. Martin Cicero Cagle died in December 1956 and gave his second wife, Alice, a life tenancy in the property. When Alice Cagle died in 1969 the property was acquired by three of Martin Cagle's grandchildren, Mary Annie Cagle Parker (b. 1928), Robert Thomas Cagle (b. 1929), and Mildred Sue Cagle Mullinax (b. 1936), all of whom were children of Oman Clyde and Laura Belle Pittman Cagle. The three divided the property, with the Cagle House itself going to Mary Annie Cagle Parker. In 1980 James Thomas Eubanks, Jr., son of Mary Louise Cagle and James Thomas Eubanks, Sr., purchased the Cagle House from Mary Annie Cagle Parker. The Cagle House was purchased by the Mora family in 2018.

== See also ==
- National Register of Historic Places listings in Pickens County, Georgia
