= Madison County Courthouse (Georgia) =

- U.S. National Register of Historic Places
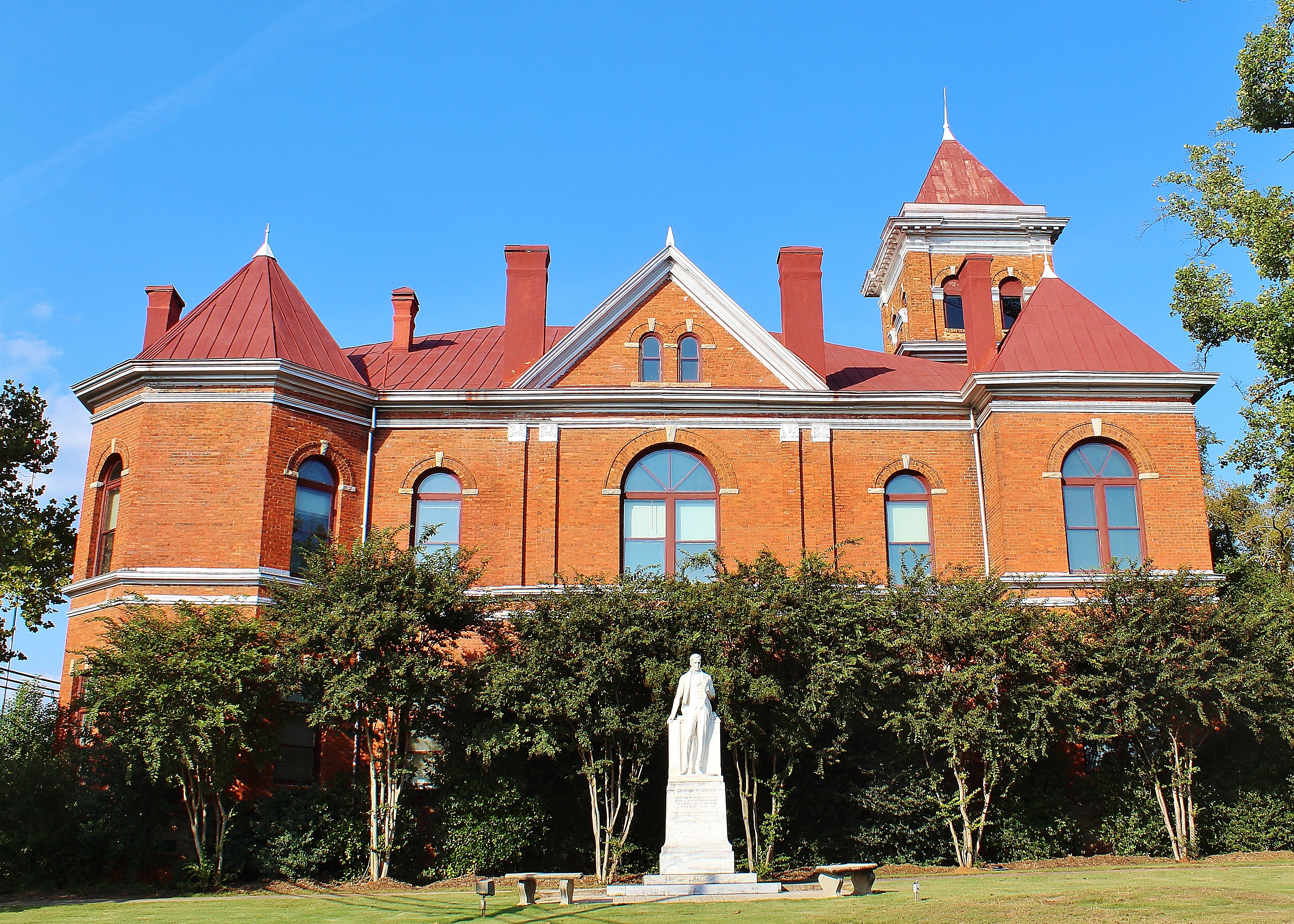

- Location within Georgia
- Location: Courthouse Sq., Danielsville, Georgia
- Coordinates: 34°07′28″N 83°13′17″W
- Area: less than one acre
- Built: 1901
- Architect: J.W. Golucke & Co.; Fred Wagener
- Architectural style: Romanesque
- MPS: Georgia County Courthouses TR
- NRHP reference No.: 80001114
- Added to NRHP: September 18, 1980

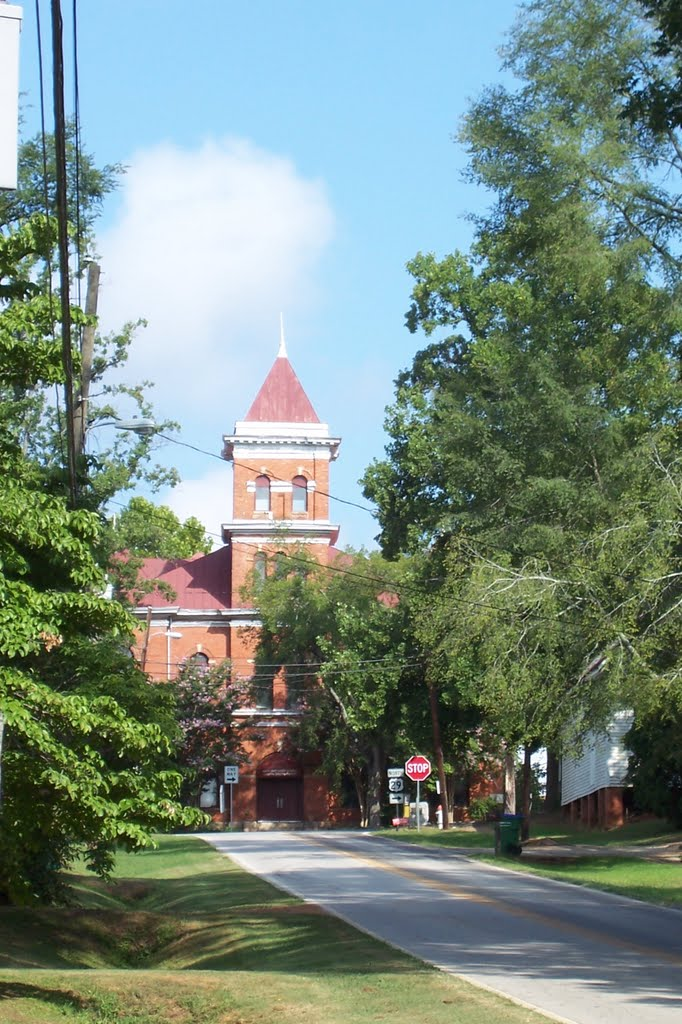
Front of Courthouse in 2012

The Madison County Courthouse in Danielsville, Georgia, county seat of Madison County, Georgia, is a historic courthouse built in 1901. It was listed on the National Register of Historic Places in 1980.

It has a cruciform plan, similar to that of the Twiggs County Courthouse (1902-04) and of the Clayton County Courthouse. It was designed by architect J.W. Golucke. The lead contractor was Fred Wagener, with construction costing a total of $18,314.

It has painted brickwork and rests on a stone foundation. The building's brickwork is laid in American bond. It has a pyramidally capped tower on its front facade.
