= Calhoun County Courthouse (Alabama) =

- U.S. National Register of Historic Places
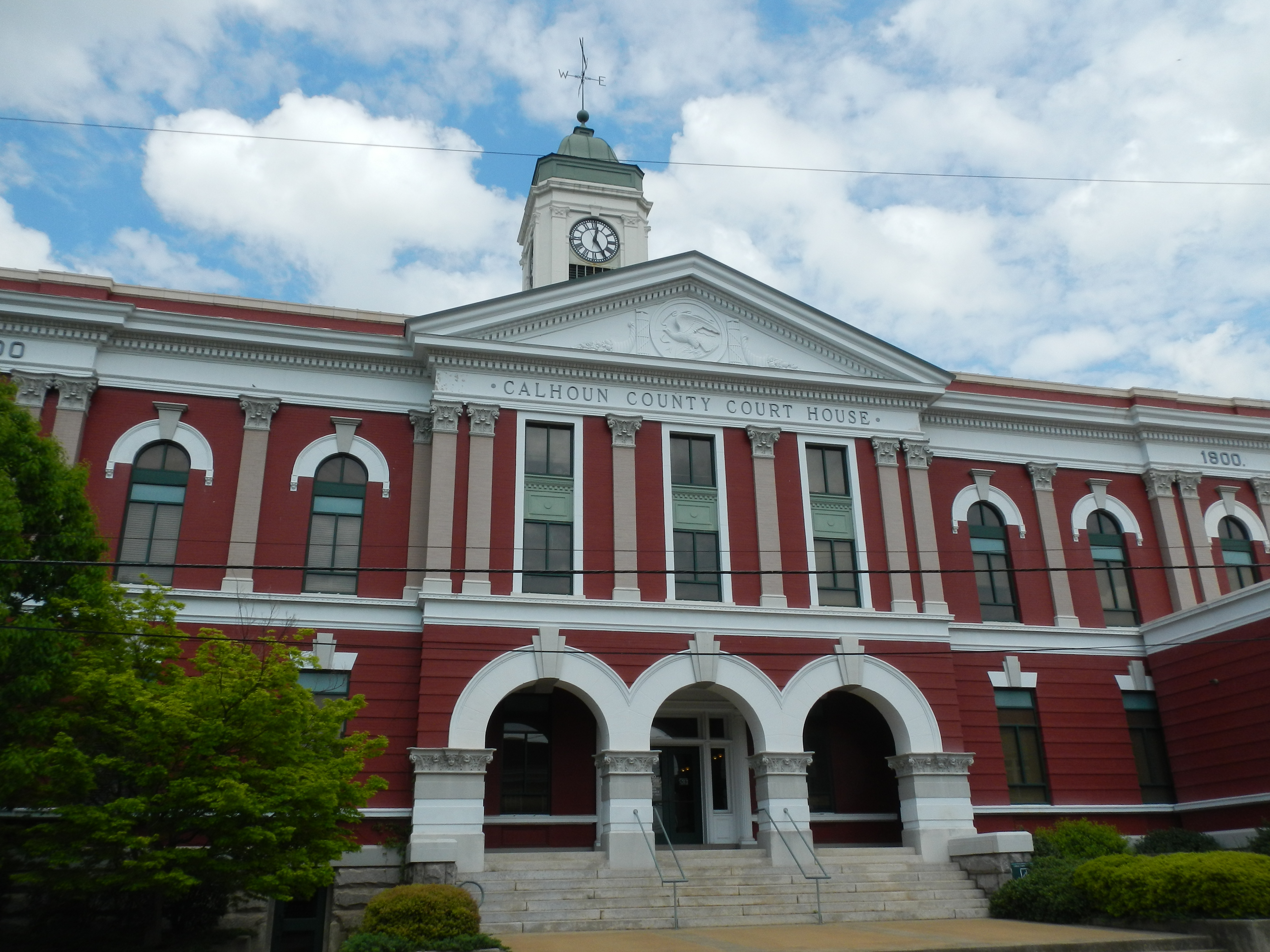

- Location within Alabama Location within the United States
- Interactive map showing the location of Calhoun County Courthouse
- Location: 25 W. Eleventh St., Anniston, Alabama
- Coordinates: 33°39′30″N 85°49′52″W
- Area: less than one acre
- Built: 1900
- Architect: J. W. Golucke
- Architectural style: Classical Revival, Renaissance Revival
- MPS: Anniston MRA
- NRHP reference No.: 85002866
- Added to NRHP: October 3, 1985

The Calhoun County Courthouse is a historic county courthouse in Anniston, Alabama, United States. It was designed by Atlanta architect J. W. Golucke and built in 1900, when the county seat of Calhoun County was moved from Jacksonville. It is one of the earliest Neoclassical courthouses in Alabama. An annex with a jail was added on the north side of the building in 1924. The courthouse was rebuilt after a 1931 fire, albeit with a slightly different clock tower. A southeastern annex was built in 1963. The building was listed on the National Register of Historic Places in 1985.

== See also ==
- List of county courthouses in Alabama
