= William Barker Whiskey Bonding Barn =

Historic whisky barn in the US state of Georgia

- U.S. National Register of Historic Places
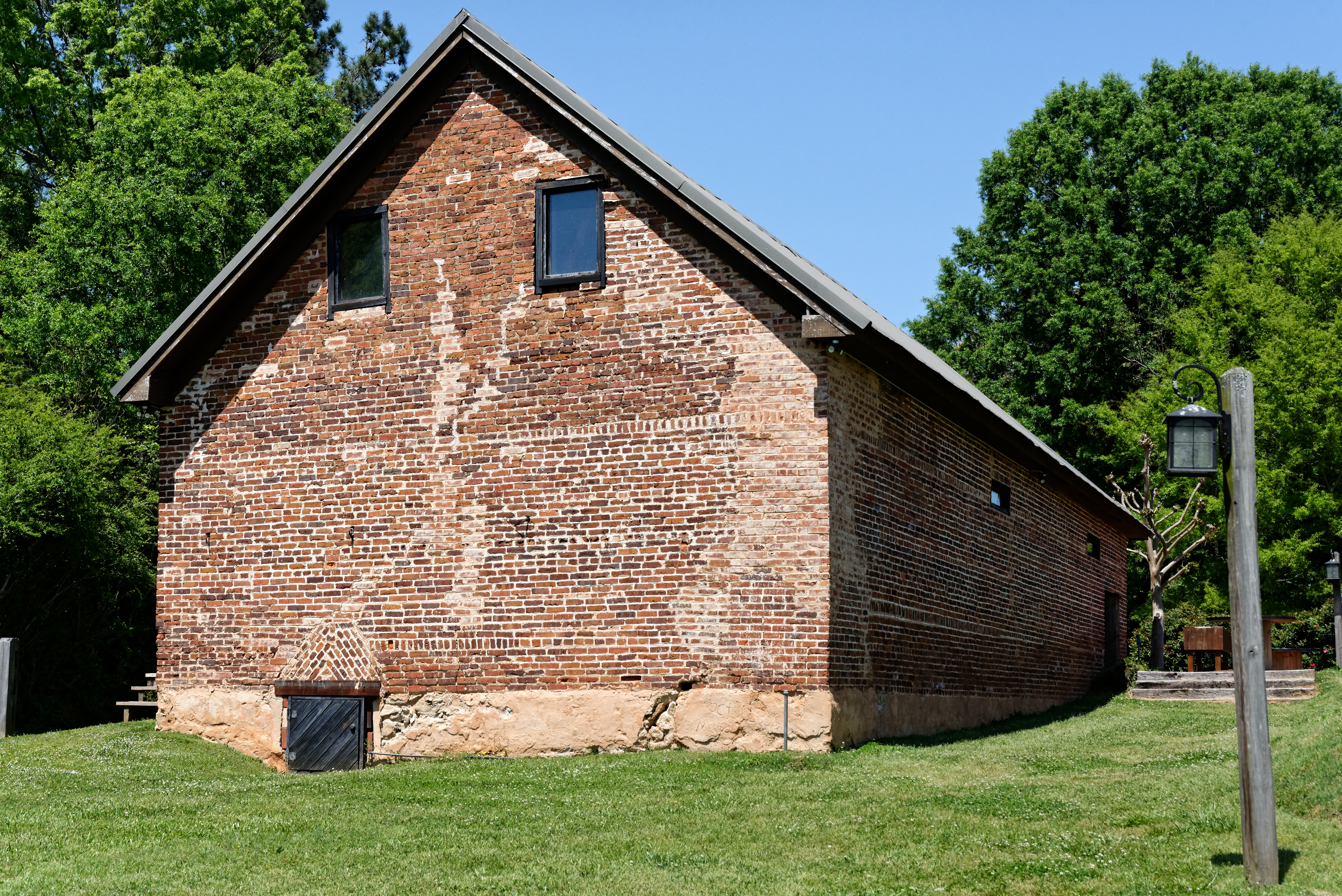

- Location within Georgia Location within the United States
- Nearest city: Molena, Georgia
- Coordinates: 33°0′51″N 84°28′5″W
- Area: 3.1 acres (1.3 ha)
- Built: c.1870
- Architectural style: Barn
- NRHP reference No.: 08000396
- Added to NRHP: May 12, 2008

The William Barker Whiskey Bonding Barn is a historic site near Molena, Georgia. It was added to the National Register of Historic Places on May 12, 2008. It is located at 9450 Old Zebulon Road. The barn dates to around 1870 and was constructed by William Thomas Barker (1839-1902), a farmer in Pike County, Georgia. Bonding barns and warehouses for the storage of whiskey were established by the U.S. Congress in 1868 in order to delay the payment of federal excise taxes while the whiskey was aging, up to four years. After the temperance movement, the barn became a store for tenant farmers. It is now used for various festivals, exhibitions and special events.

It is a 1 1/2-story brick building, built c.1870 as a storehouse for bonded whiskey. It has massive walls punctuated by small barred windows.

== See also ==
- National Register of Historic Places listings in Pike County, Georgia
