= Bartow County Courthouse =

Historic courthouse in the US state of Georgia

- U.S. National Register of Historic Places
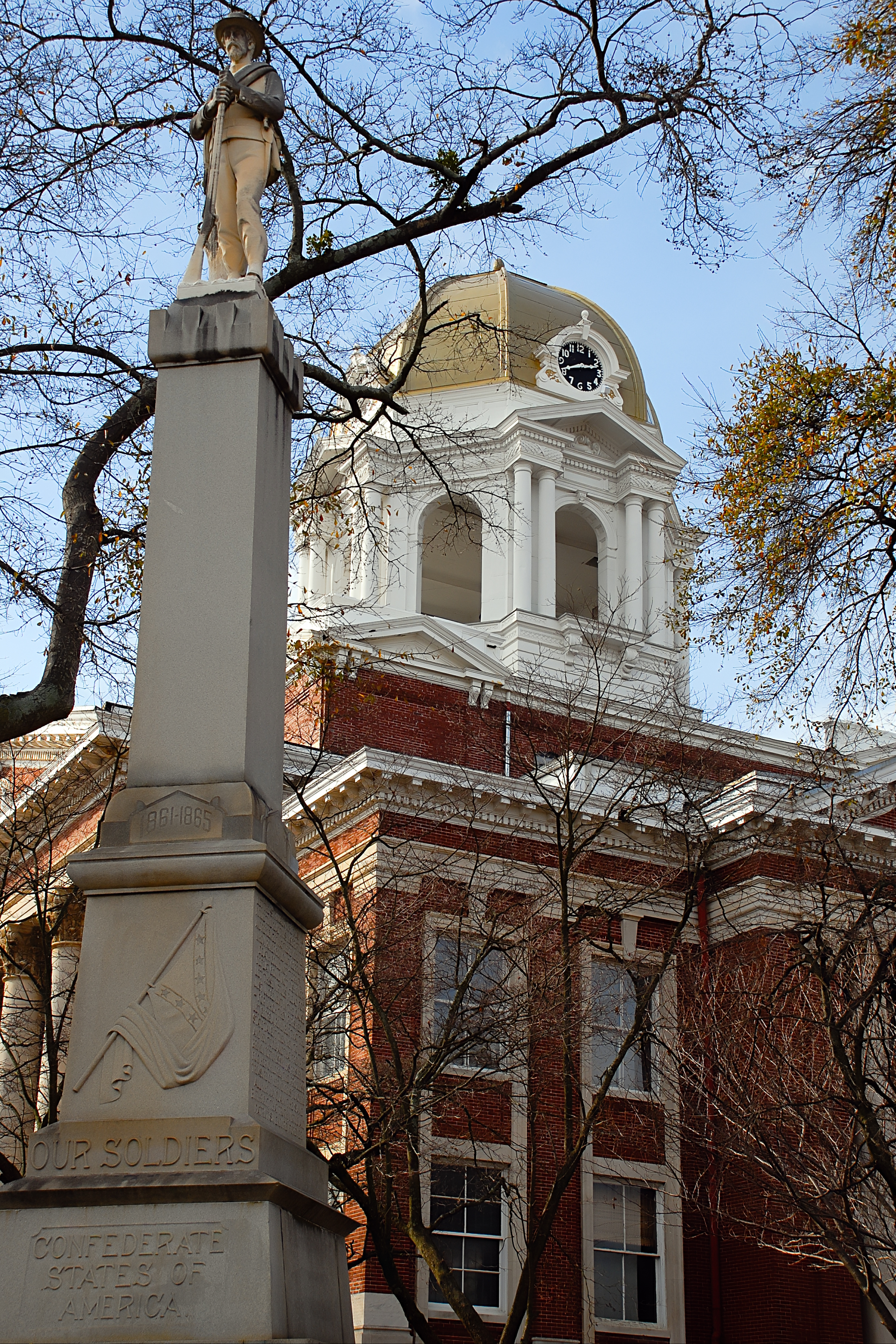

- Location within Georgia Location within the United States
- Interactive map showing the location of Bartow County Courthouse
- Location: Courthouse Sq., Cartersville, Georgia
- Coordinates: 34.16592°N 84.79775°W
- Area: 1 acre (0.40 ha)
- Built: 1902
- Architect: Golucke, J.W., & Co.; Kenneth McDonald & Co.
- Architectural style: Classical Revival
- MPS: Georgia County Courthouses TR
- NRHP reference No.: 80000971
- Added to NRHP: September 18, 1980

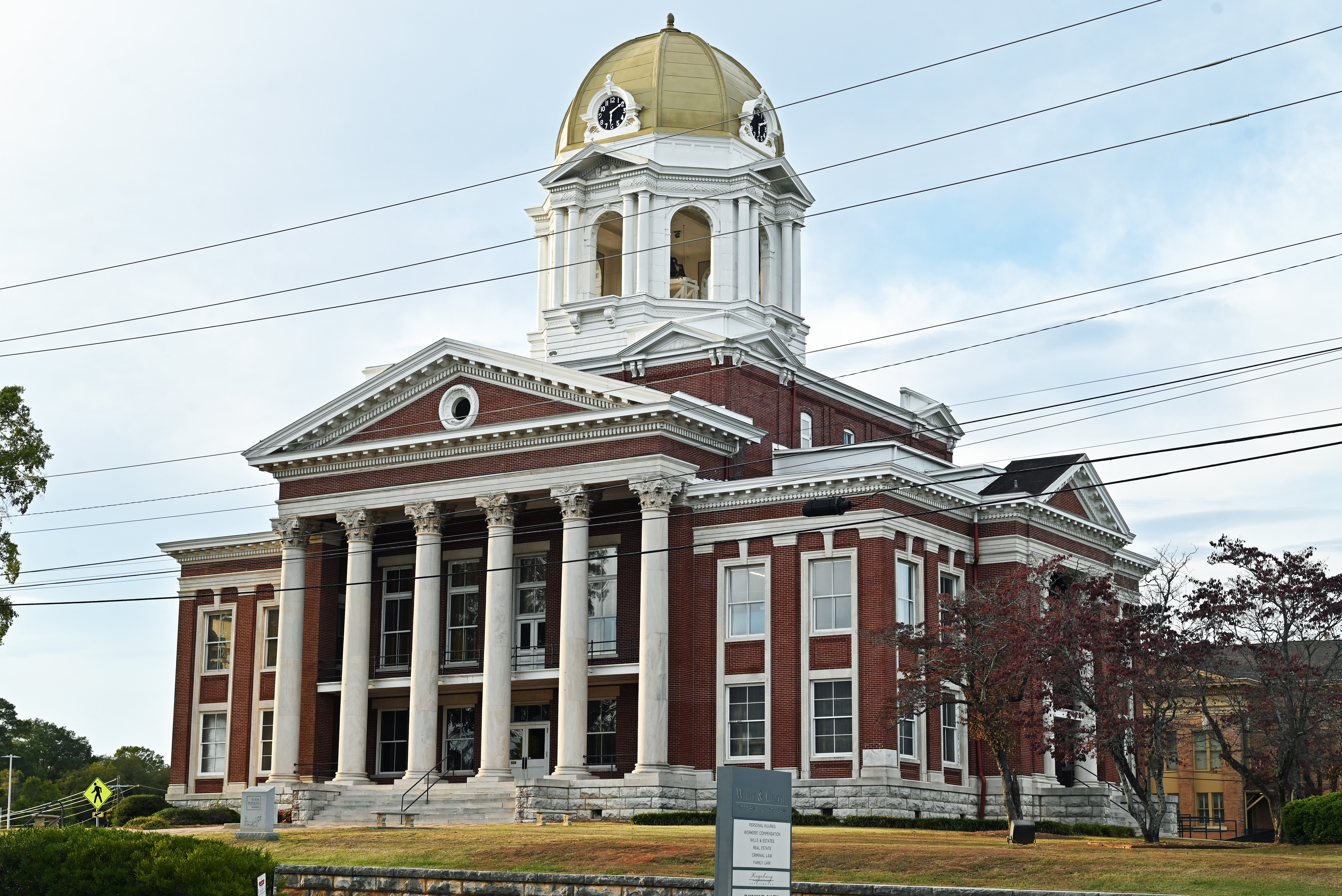
The courthouse

The Bartow County Courthouse, built in 1902, is an historic redbrick Classical Revival style county courthouse located on Courthouse Square in Cartersville, Bartow County, Georgia, United States. Designed by the Louisville, Kentucky architectural firm of Kenneth McDonald & Co. together with self-taught Georgia architect J. W. Golucke, who is said to have designed 27 courthouses in Georgia and four in Alabama, it is Bartow County's third courthouse and the second one built in Cartersville.

The first courthouse was built in Cassville while the county was known as Cass County. It was burned by General Sherman's troops in 1864. In 1867 the county seat was moved to Cartersville and the second courthouse was built in 1873. It proved to be unsatisfactory because court proceedings had to be halted while trains passed by on the nearby railroad. In 1992 a courthouse annex known as the Frank Moore Administration and Judicial Center was completed. While the 1902 building is still used for some court purposes, most of the proceedings are held in the 1992 building.

On September 18, 1980, the 1902 courthouse was added to the National Register of Historic Places.
