= New Hebron Baptist Church =

Historic church in Georgia, United States

- U.S. National Register of Historic Places
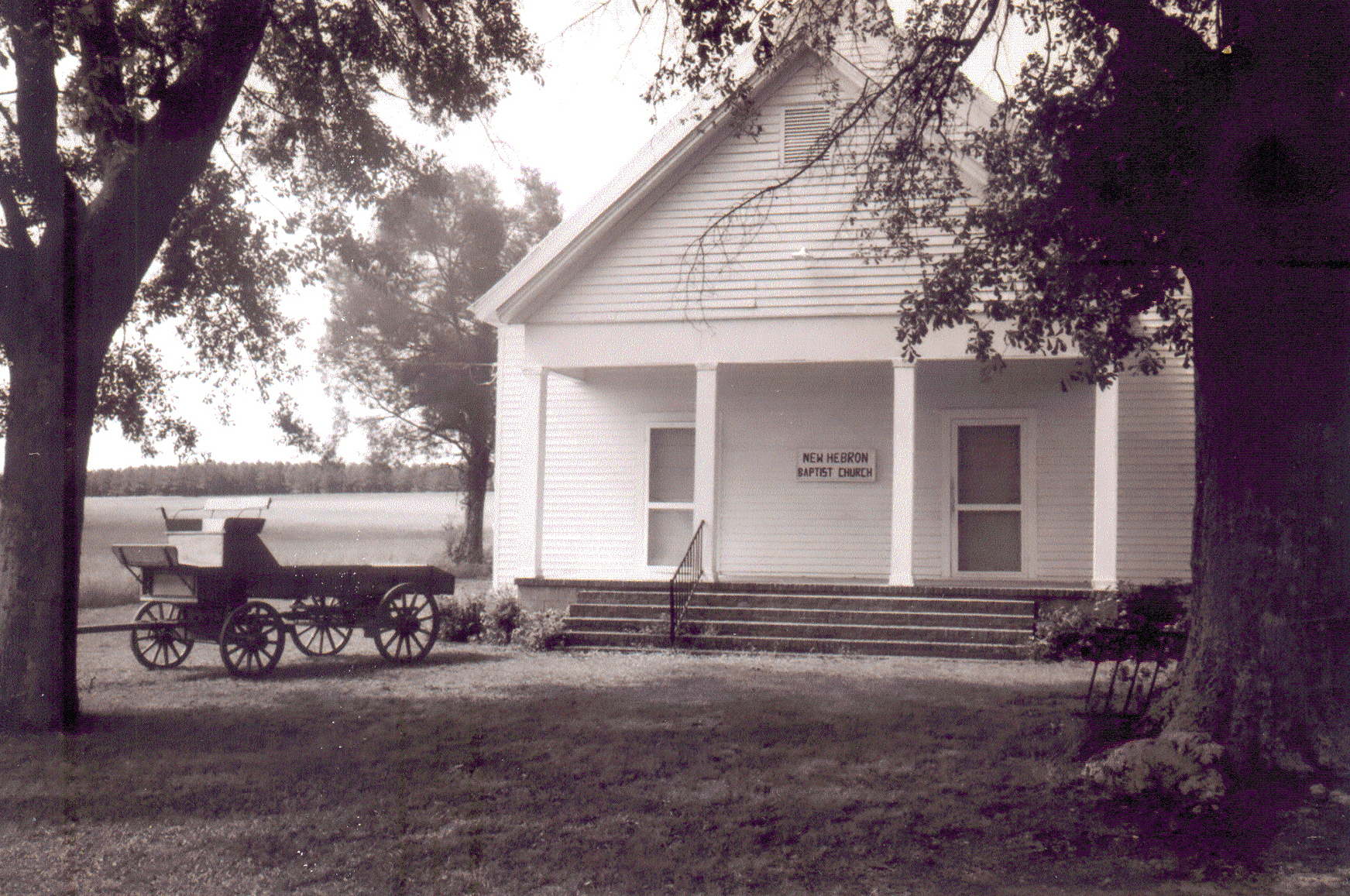
- Photo from 2019

- Location within Georgia Location within the United States
- Location: 570 New Hebron Church Rd., Concord, Georgia
- Coordinates: 33°06′06″N 84°29′24″W
- Built: 1908
- NRHP reference No.: 100000906
- Added to NRHP: April 24, 2017

The New Hebron Baptist Church in Concord, Georgia was listed on the National Register of Historic Places in 2017.

The church was organized in 1907; it had 31 charter members.

The building, 33 by 48 feet (10 m × 15 m) was built within 30 days during the summer of 1908. Its foundation is brick and mortar pillars; it has a 15-foot (4.6 m) interior ceiling.
