= Clayton County Courthouse (Georgia) =

Historic courthouse in Georgia, United States

Coordinates: 33°31′15″N 84°21′11″W

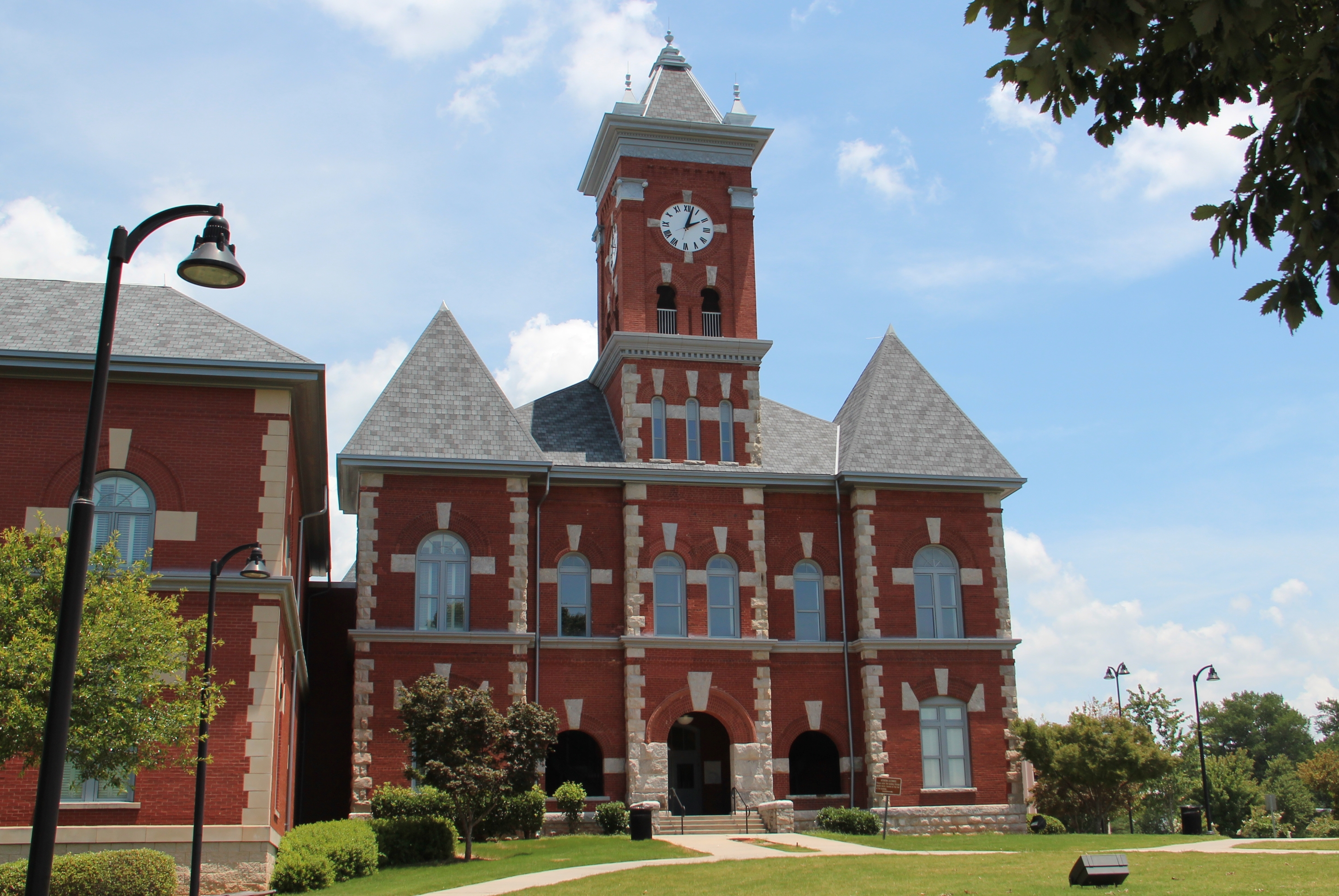
Clayton County Courthouse

The Clayton County Courthouse in Jonesboro, Georgia, is a historic courthouse.

It was designed by J.W. Golucke.

This or a predecessor courthouse was designed by Maximilien van den Corput (c. 1825 – 1911), also known as Max Corput, a Belgian-American architect.

The Twiggs County Courthouse and the Madison County Courthouse (Danielsville, Georgia) (1901), both designed by J.W. Golucke, have been noted to be similar.

It is listed on the National Register of Historic Places as a contributing building in the Jonesboro Historic District. In 1980, it was in use as a court offices building.

A previous courthouse was destroyed in the August 20, 1864, cavalry raid of Judson Kilpatrick, which burned most of the town.
