= Macon County Courthouse (Alabama) =

- U.S. National Register of Historic Places
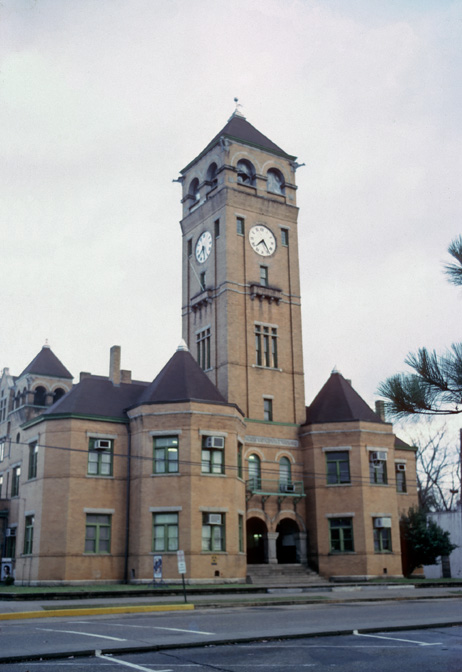
- Macon County Courthouse 1977 photograph by Calvin Beale

- Location within Alabama Location within the United States
- Interactive map showing the location of Macon County Courthouse
- Location: E. Northside and N. Main Sts., Tuskegee, Alabama
- Coordinates: 32°25′28″N 85°41′27″W
- Area: less than one acre
- Built: 1905
- Architect: J.W. Golucke
- Architectural style: Mid 19th Century Revival, Romanesque, Richardsonian Romanesque
- NRHP reference No.: 78000495
- Added to NRHP: November 17, 1978

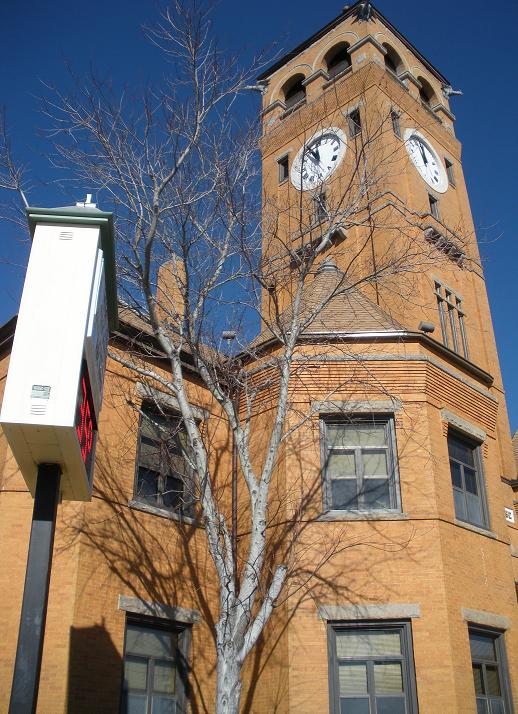

Macon County Courthouse is a historic county courthouse in downtown Tuskegee, Alabama, county seat of Macon County, Alabama. A brick courthouse was constructed in the middle of the 19th century, replacing wooden structures used earlier. The current courthouse, an example of Romanesque Revival architecture, was designed by J.W. Golucke and built in 1905 (completed in 1906). It includes gargoyles. A monument to confederate soldiers is located nearby. The courthouse was listed on the National Register of Historic Places on November 17, 1978. The courthouse is at 101 East Northside Street.

Golucke designed numerous courthouses in Georgia. Gargoyles adorn the courthouse's clocktower.

In 1957 an amendment to the Alabama Constitution was passed to form a committee to study how to abolish the county. Gerrymanders and syphilis study cases were heard at the courthouse. It is the only courthouse in Alabama designed by Golucke and the only courthouse in Alabama with gargoyles. It has granite trim.

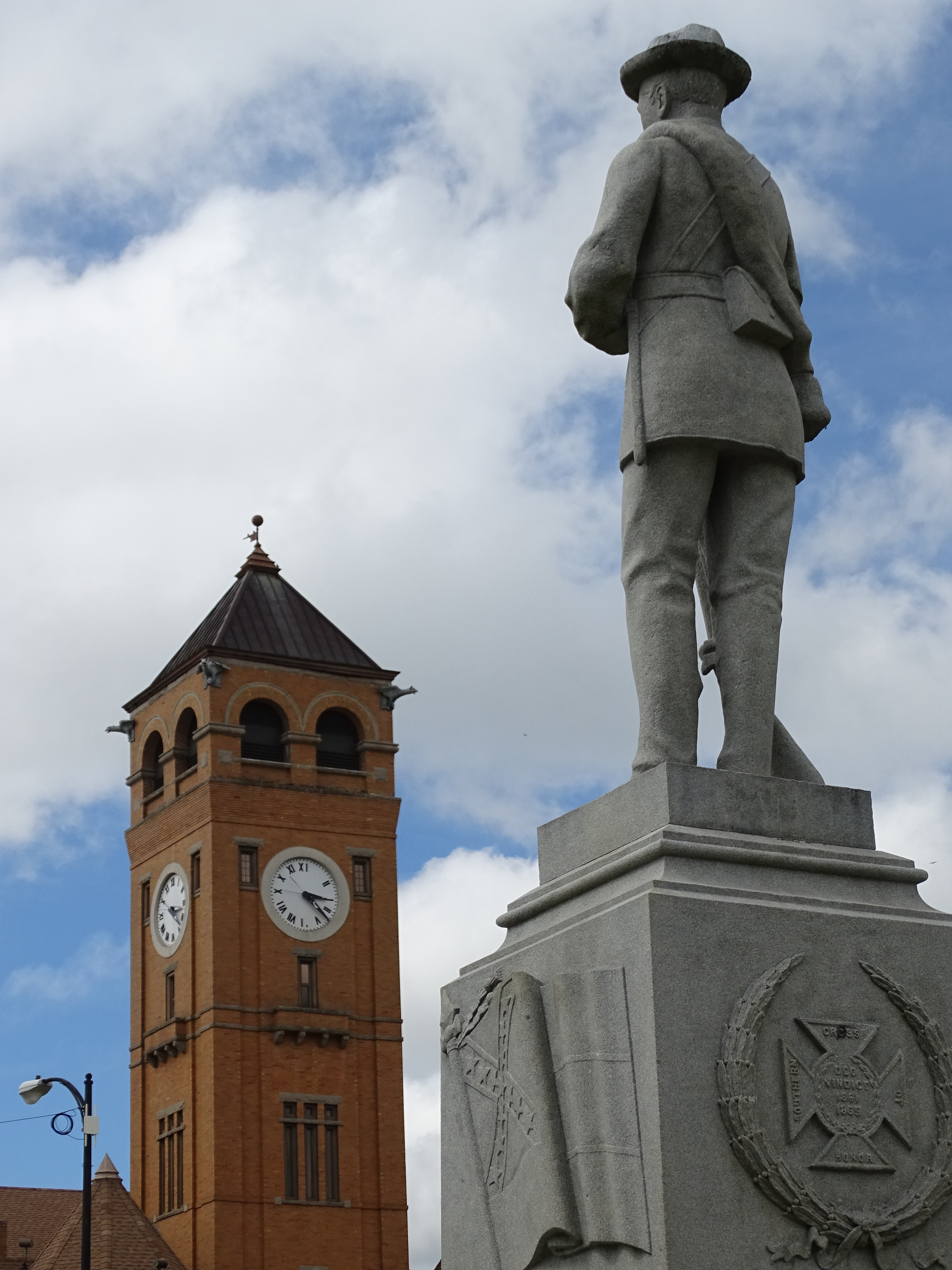

The Tuskegee Confederate Monument in Tuskegee Square in front of the courthouse is controversial. Proposals to remove or relocate it have not succeeded and it has been vandalized repeatedly. It sits on land given by the county to the United Daughters of the Confederacy for a park and the monument. The site was for whites only. The monument is adorned with Confederate flags. Macon County is more than 80 percent African American. Alabama passed a law protecting Confederate monuments. In 2023 the statue was ordered removed.

== See also ==
- List of county courthouses in Alabama
- National Register of Historic Places listings in Macon County, Alabama
