= Pike County Courthouse (Georgia) =

- U.S. National Register of Historic Places
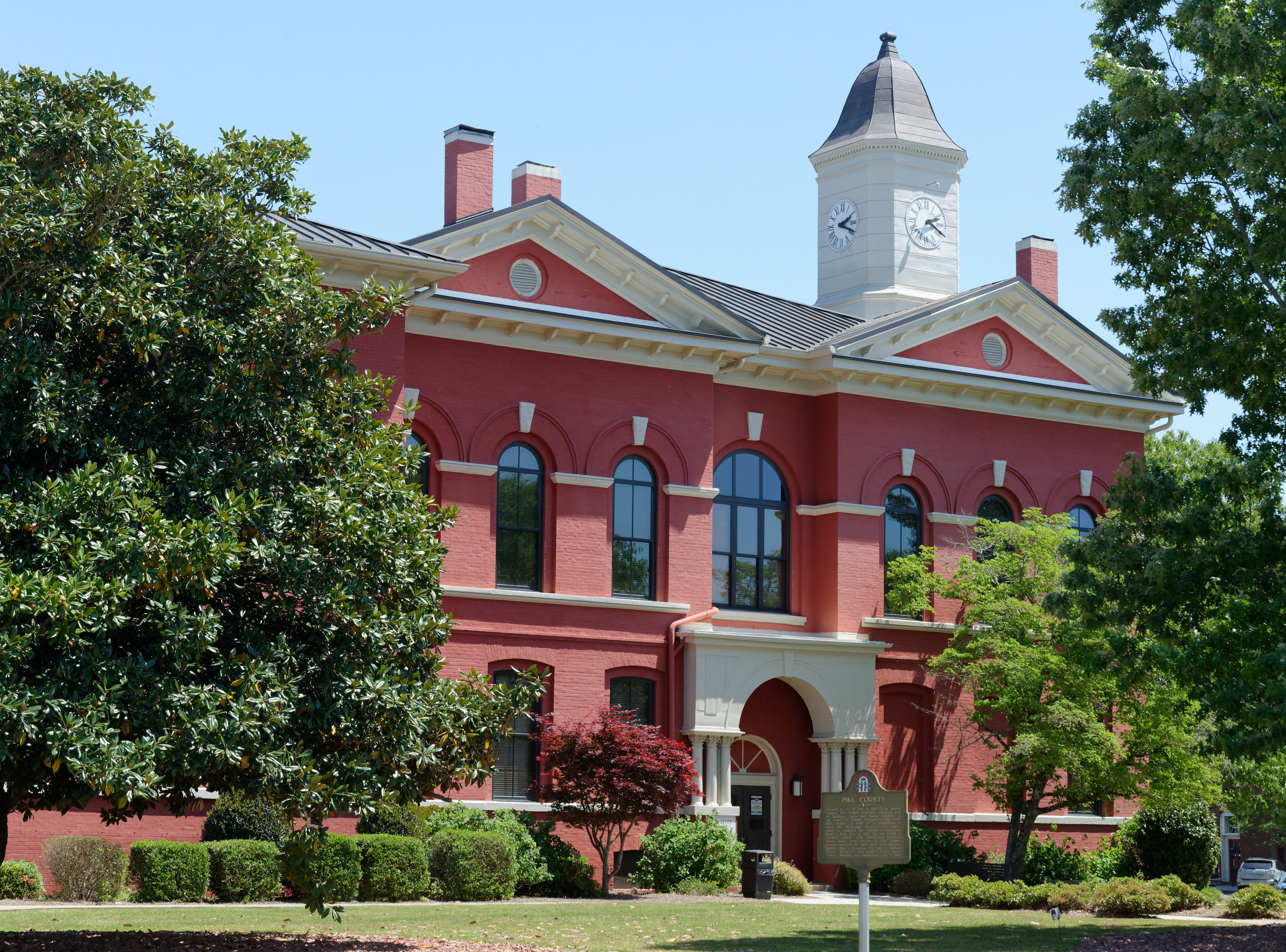
- Pike County Courthouse, side view

- Location within Georgia Location within the United States
- Interactive map showing the location of Pike County Courthouse
- Location: Courthouse Sq., Zebulon, Georgia
- Coordinates: 33°6′8″N 84°20′32″W
- Area: 2 acres (0.81 ha)
- Built: 1895
- Architect: Golucke & Stewart; Marshall, Arthur
- Architectural style: Romanesque Revival, Colonial Revival
- MPS: Georgia County Courthouses TR
- NRHP reference No.: 80001222
- Added to NRHP: September 18, 1980

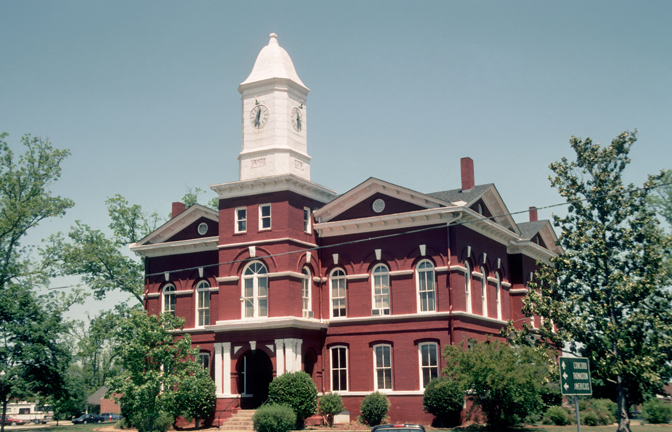
Front side photographed by Calvin Beale

Pike County Courthouse is the courthouse for Pike County, Georgia. It is located in Zebulon, Georgia's Courthouse Square. It was designed by Golucke & Stewart in Romanesque Revival architecture and Colonial Revival architecture styles and built in 1895. It was added to the National Register of Historic Places in 1980.

== See also ==
- National Register of Historic Places listings in Pike County, Georgia
