= J. W. Golucke =

American architect (1865–1907)

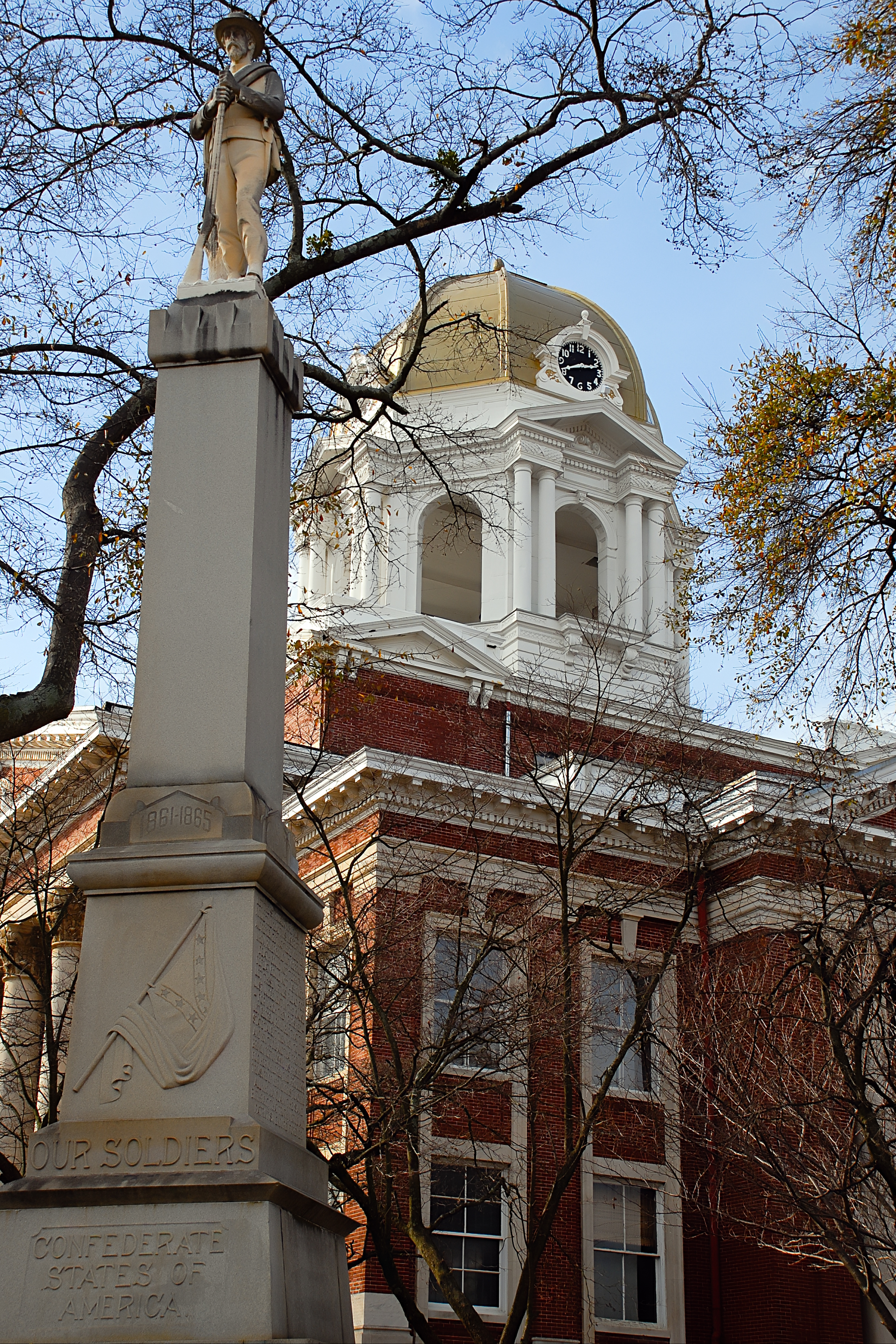
The Bartow County Courthouse in Cartersville, Georgia, designed by Golucke and built in 1902.

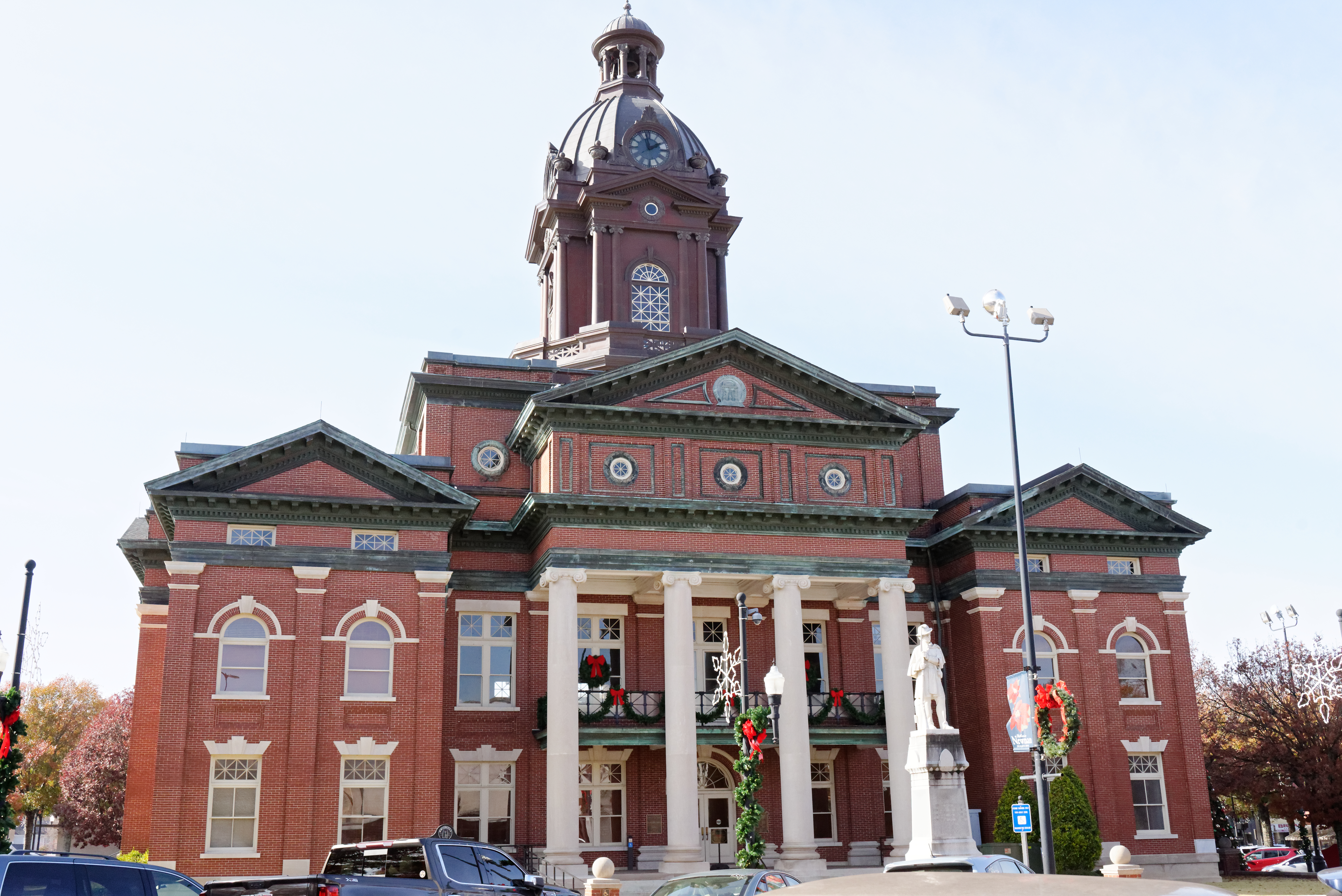
Coweta County Courthouse

James Wingfield Golucke (1857–1907), often known as J.W. Golucke, was an American architect based in Atlanta, Georgia. His place of birth is unknown but it was either Taliaferro County or more likely Wilkes County to Cornelia Susan Wingfield and Edmund Golucke, a German cabinetmaker. In 1878, he married Amulette A. Darracott.

Golucke was a self-taught architect who began practicing in Atlanta in 1891. He worked alone and also partnered with Golucke & Stewart. On his own, he designed about 15 courthouses in Georgia. With partner George Wilson Stewart, he designed five Georgia courthouses and other buildings such as the Fitzpatrick Hotel. Little is known about Stewart besides that he practiced by himself after 1900, including acting as an assisting architect for the Candler Building during its 1903-1906 construction in Atlanta.

Many of Golucke's works, alone or with partners, are listed on the U.S. National Register of Historic Places.

== Works ==
Works by Golucke or his firm include (with attribution):

- Baker County Courthouse, Courthouse Sq. Newton, GA (Golucke, J.W. & Co.), NRHP-listed
- Banks County Jail, Silver Shoals Rd. Homer, GA (Golucke, J.W.,& Co.), NRHP-listed
- Bartow County Courthouse, Courthouse Sq. Cartersville, GA (Golucke, J.W., & Co.), NRHP-listed
- Calhoun County Courthouse, 25 W. Eleventh St. Anniston, AL (Golucke, J.W.), NRHP-listed
- Clayton County Courthouse, Jonesboro, Georgia
- Coweta County Courthouse, Courthouse Sq. Newnan, GA (Golucke, J.W.)
- Fitzpatrick Hotel, 18 W. Public Square Washington, GA (Golucke & Stewart), NRHP-listed
- Henry County Courthouse, Courthouse Sq. McDonough, GA (Golucke & Stewart), NRHP-listed
- Johnson County Courthouse, Courthouse Sq. Wrightsville, GA (Golucke & Stewart), NRHP-listed
- Jones County Courthouse, GA 49 Gray, GA (Golucke, J.W.), NRHP-listed
- Locust Grove Institute Academic Building, 3644 GA 42 Locust Grove, GA (Golucke, James W.), NRHP-listed
- Macon County Courthouse, E. Northside and N. Main Sts. Tuskegee, AL (Golucke, J.W.), NRHP-listed
- Madison County Courthouse, Courthouse Sq. Danielsville, GA (Golucke, J.W.,& Co.), NRHP-listed
- Meriwether County Courthouse, 100 Courthouse Sq. Greenville, GA (Colucke[sp], J.W., & Co.), NRHP-listed
- Old Union County Courthouse, Courthouse Sq. Blairsville, GA Golucke & Stewart), NRHP-listed
- Pickens County Jail, N. Main St. Jasper, GA (Golucke, James W.), NRHP-listed
- Pierce County Courthouse, Main St. Blackshear, GA (Golucke, J.W.,& Co.), NRHP-listed
- Pike County Courthouse, Courthouse Sq. Zebulon, GA (Golucke & Stewart), NRHP-listed
- Rockdale County Jail, 967 Milstead Ave. Conyers, GA (Golucke, J. W.), NRHP-listed
- Schley County Courthouse, GA 26 Ellaville, GA (Golucke & Stewart), NRHP-listed
- Secondary Industrial School, 1112 29th St. Columbus, GA (Golucke J.W. & Co.), NRHP-listed
- Twiggs County Courthouse, Courthouse Sq. Jeffersonville, GA (Golucke, J.W.,& Co.), NRHP-listed
- Worth County Courthouse, Courthouse Sq. Sylvester, GA (Golucke, J.W.), NRHP-listed
- One or more works in Cordele Commercial Historic District, roughly bounded by Sixth Ave., Sixth St., Ninth Ave., and Fourteenth St. Cordele, GA (Golucke, J.W., & Co.), NRHP-listed
- One or more works in Covington Historic District, roughly Covington City S of US 278 Covington, GA (Golucke, J.W., and Company, et al.), NRHP-listed
- One or more works in Crawfordville Historic District, roughly centered on the downtown business district of Crawfordville, GA (Golucke, Charle), NRHP-listed
- One or more works in Newnan Commercial Historic District, Roughly bounded by Lee, Perry, Salbide, Lagrange, W. Spring, Brown, Madison, and Jefferson Newnan, GA (Golucke, J.W.), NRHP-listed
- One or more works in Northwest Newnan Residential Historic District, Roughly bounded by RR tracks, Jefferson, Cavender, Duncan, and Browns Sts. Newnan, GA (Golucke, J.W.), NRHP-listed
