= Bothwell & Nash =

Architecture firm

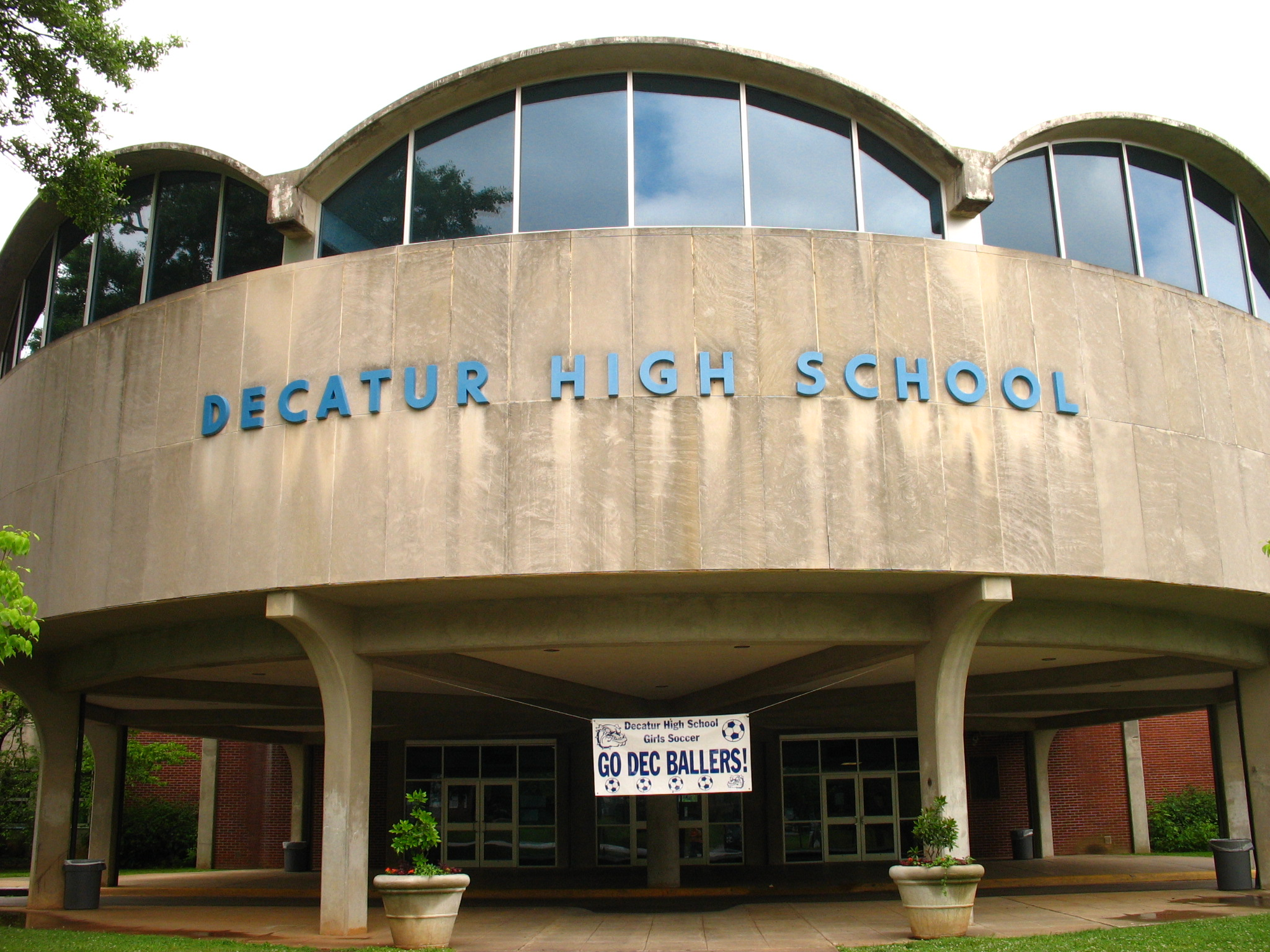
Decatur High School

Bothwell & Nash was an architecture firm in the United States, known for their work in Decatur, Georgia. The firm designed Decatur High School (Georgia) (1965) and Sharian Rugs building (1946) in Decatur. The firm was based in Marietta, Georgia.

== Additional work ==
- Favor Road High School, Cobb County, Georgia
