= Jones County Courthouse (Georgia) =

- U.S. National Register of Historic Places
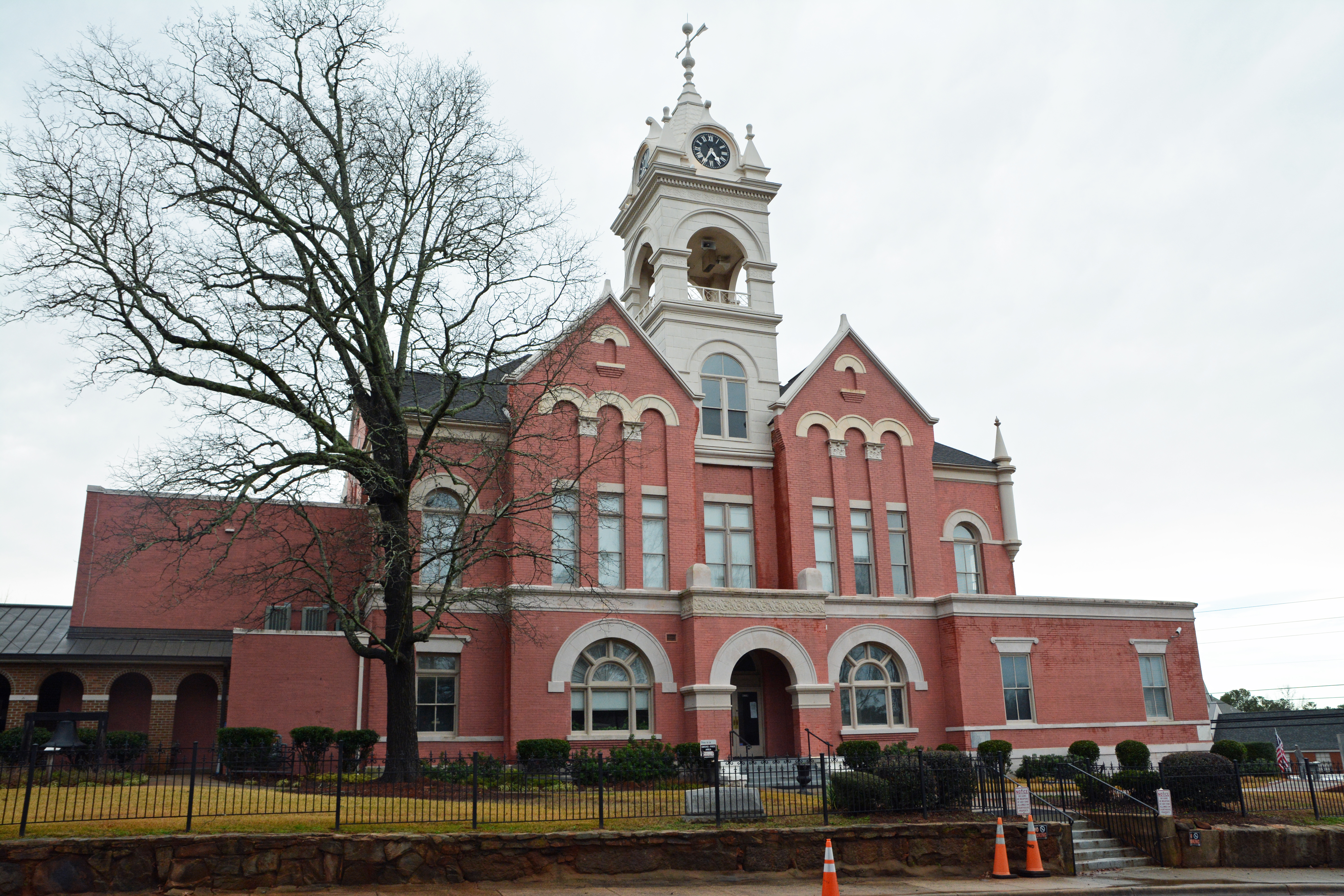

- Location within Georgia Location within the United States
- Location: GA 49, Gray, Georgia
- Coordinates: 33.00823°N 83.53665°W
- Area: 1.1 acres (0.45 ha)
- Built: 1906
- Built by: Atlanta Fireproofing Co.
- Architect: J.W. Golucke
- Architectural style: Romanesque
- MPS: Georgia County Courthouses TR
- NRHP reference No.: 80001102
- Added to NRHP: September 18, 1980

The Jones County Courthouse, in Gray, Georgia was built in 1906 in the Romanesque Revival style. It was designed by J. W. Golucke and is noted for its arched clock tower.

The first courthouse, in Albany, Georgia (not to be confused with present-day Albany, Georgia), later renamed Clinton, Georgia, was the private residence of William Jones. A temporary structure housed the court until 1816, when a third, more permanent, building was erected. When the county seat moved to Gray, Georgia, the current courthouse was built in 1905. It is noted for its arched clock tower, which was restored in 2005–2006. The courthouse was rehabilitated in 1992. It was added to the National Register of Historic Places in 1980.

It cost $35,000 to construct in 1906. Dates and costs of later additions are unknown.
