= Jonesboro Historic District (Jonesboro, Georgia) =

Historic district in Georgia, United States

- U.S. National Register of Historic Places
- U.S. Historic district
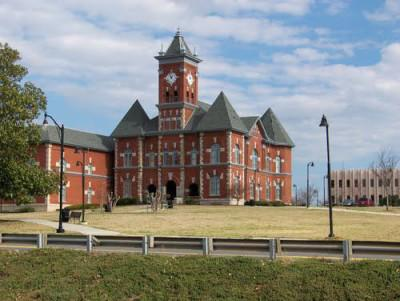
- Clayton County Courthouse

- Location within Metro Atlanta Location within Georgia Location within the United States
- Location: GA 54 and 3, Jonesboro, Georgia
- Coordinates: 33°31′26″N 84°21′15″W
- Architect: Mansfield & Chapman
- Architectural style: Greek Revival, Gothic
- NRHP reference No.: 72000381
- Added to NRHP: January 20, 1972

Jonesboro Historic District in Jonesboro, Georgia is a historic district that was listed on the National Register of Historic Places (NRHP) in 1972.

Jonesboro was the setting of much of the 1936 novel Gone with the Wind; the fictional houses Tara and Twelve Oaks were placed near it, in Clayton County.

It includes Stately Oaks, also separately listed on the NRHP, which is believed to be the inspiration for Tara.

It includes the Clayton County Courthouse.
