= Rex Mill =

- U.S. National Register of Historic Places
- U.S. Historic district
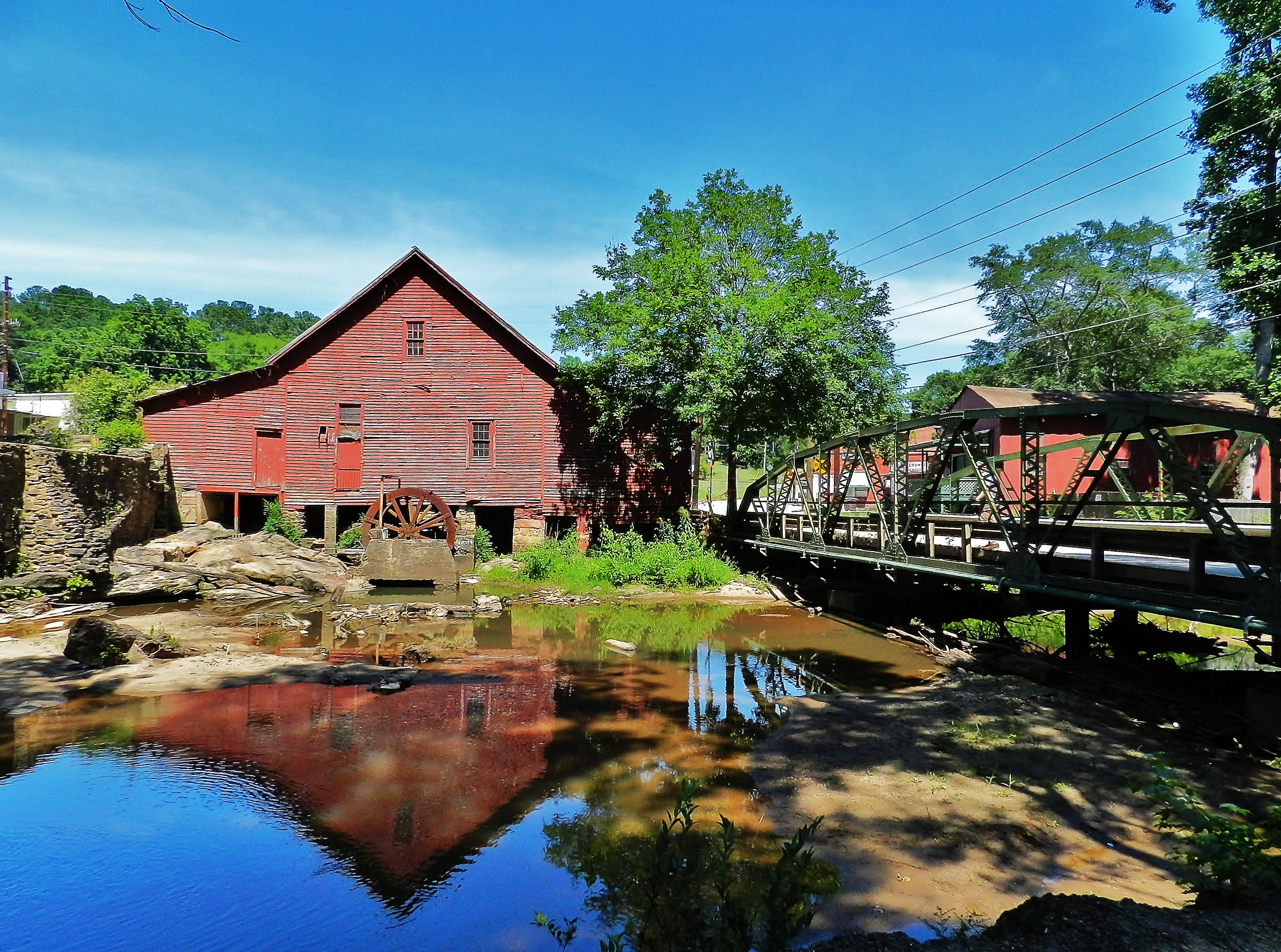

- Location within Georgia Location within the United States
- Location: Rex Rd., Rex, Georgia
- Coordinates: 33°35′36″N 84°16′07″W
- Built: c.1820-1860
- NRHP reference No.: 79000712
- Added to NRHP: March 7, 1979

Rex Mill in Rex, Georgia is a grist mill that was listed on the National Register of Historic Places (NRHP) in 1979.

It was likely built sometime between 1820 and 1860 by I. L. ("Touch") Hollingsworth, who is known to have owned the mill in 1880.

It is located on Cotton Indian Creek at Rex Road, about 1.5 miles (2.4 km) east of Georgia Highway 42.

It is believed to have always been painted red, except once briefly silver but repainted red due to outcry.
