= Griffeth-Pendley House =

Historic house in Georgia, United States

- U.S. National Register of Historic Places
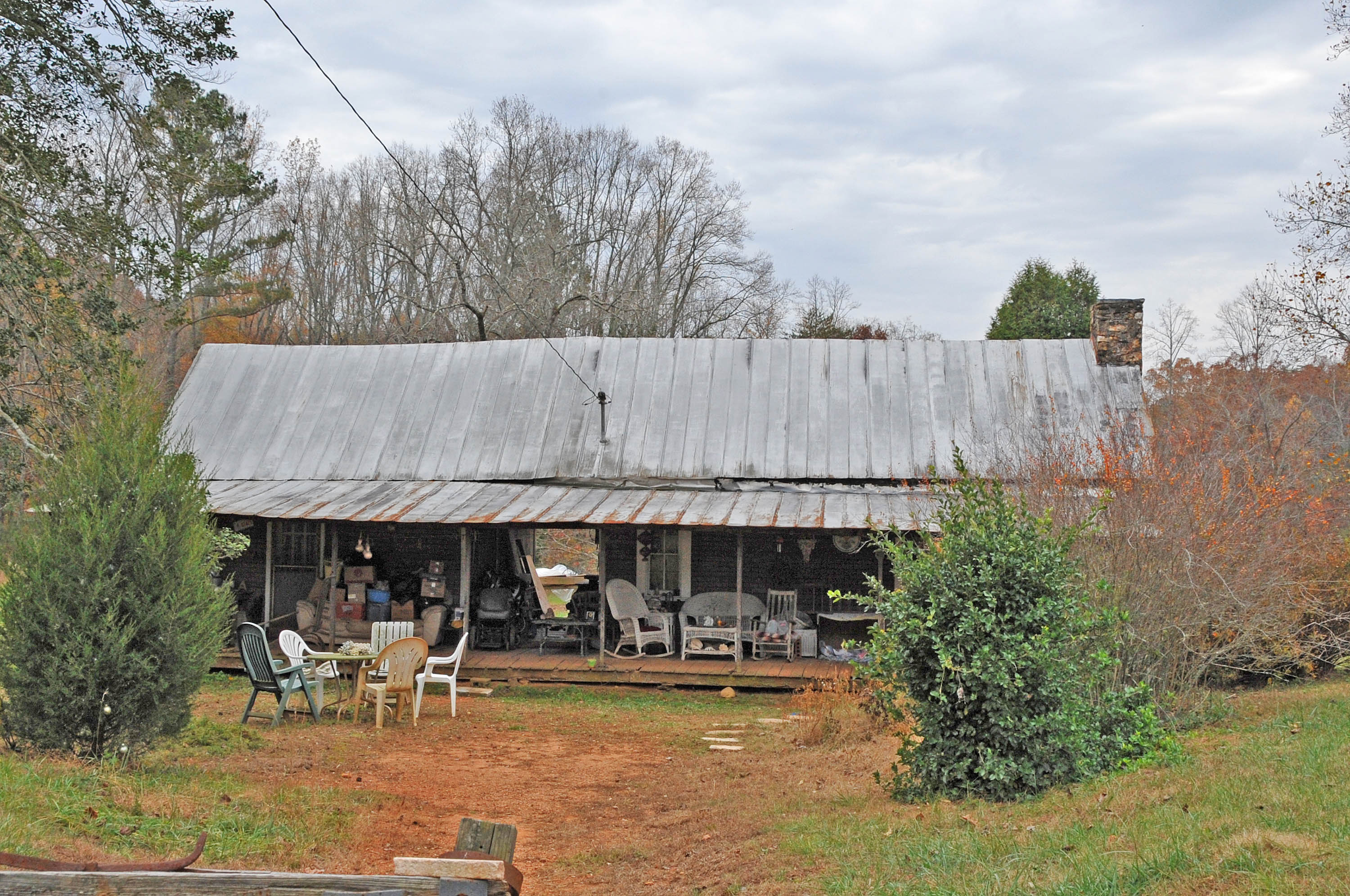

- Location within Georgia Location within the United States
- Nearest city: Jasper, Georgia
- Coordinates: 34°27′46″N 84°23′30″W
- Area: 10 acres (4.0 ha)
- Built: 1877
- Architectural style: Dogtrot
- NRHP reference No.: 08000293
- Added to NRHP: April 16, 2008

Griffeth-Pendley House is a historic property that includes a log dogtrot home, barn and shed in Jasper, Georgia. It was built by Caleb "Cale" Griffeth III who inherited the 110-acre property from his father Caleb Griffeth II in 1877. It was listed on the National Register of Historic Places on April 16, 2008. It is located at 2198 Cove Road.

== See also ==
- National Register of Historic Places listings in Pickens County, Georgia
