= Stately Oaks =

Historic house in Georgia, United States

- U.S. National Register of Historic Places
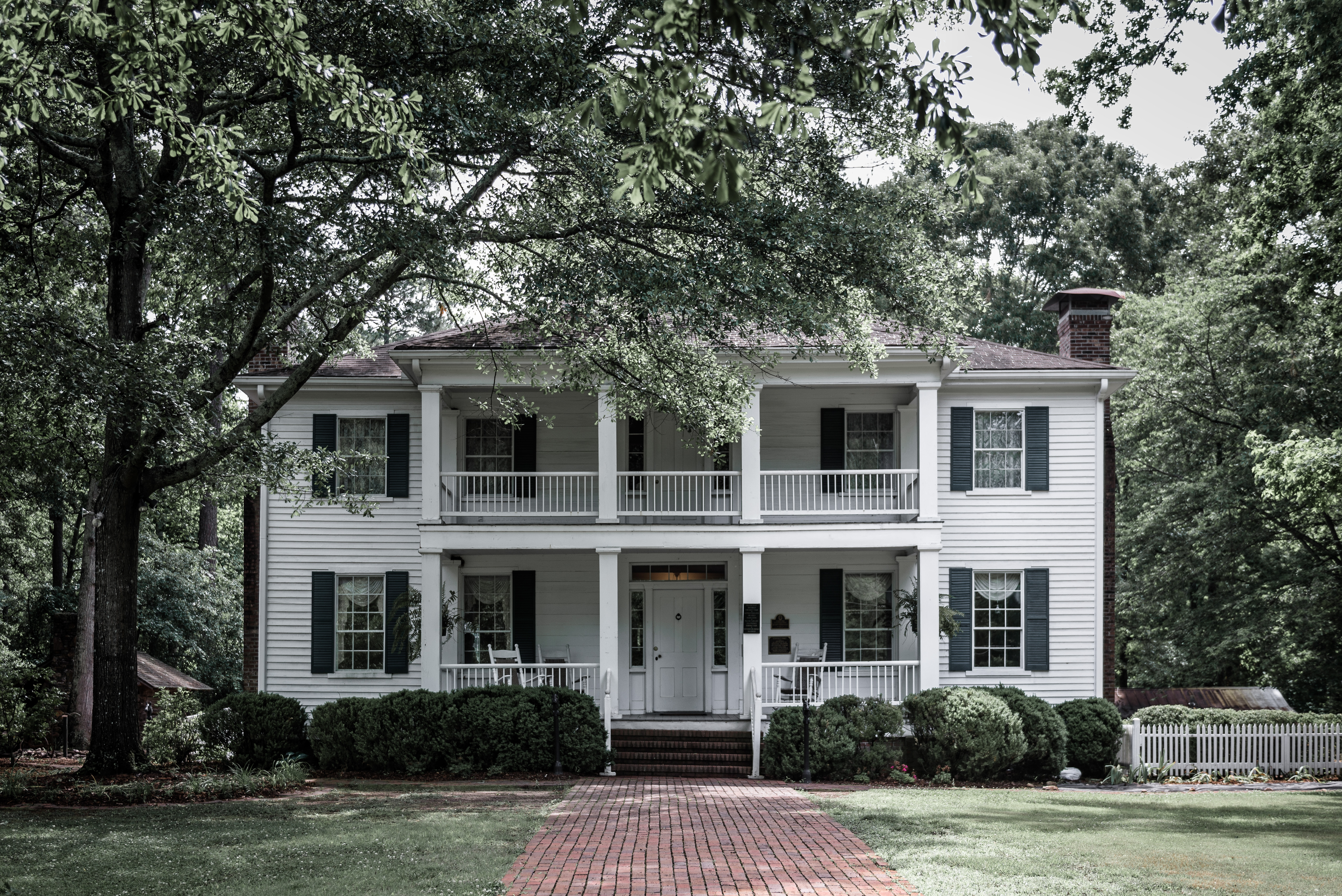
- Front of the Stately Oaks plantation house

- Location within Metro Atlanta Location within Georgia Location within the United States
- Location: Jodeco Rd., 100 Carriage Lane, Jonesboro, Georgia
- Coordinates: 33.51538°N 84.35046°W
- Built: 1839
- Architectural style: Greek Revival
- NRHP reference No.: 72000382
- Added to NRHP: March 16, 1972

Stately Oaks Historical Community is a Greek Revival antebellum mansion with a variety of outbuildings and gardens located in Margaret Mitchell Memorial Park in Jonesboro, Georgia. Built in 1839, the house was listed on the National Register of Historic Places in 1972. It is also known as Orr House, The Oaks, and Robert McCord House and it is included in the Jonesboro Historic District.

Stately Oaks is owned by Historical Jonesboro/Clayton County Inc., and features the period house, the home's separate log kitchen, a well house, a tenant house, an 1896 country store, and a one-room schoolhouse.

The house, along with Rural Home, was believed to be the inspiration for Tara, the legendary home of Scarlett O'Hara and her family in Margaret Mitchell's novel Gone with the Wind.
