= Calvin Beale =

American demographer (1923–2008)

Calvin L Beale
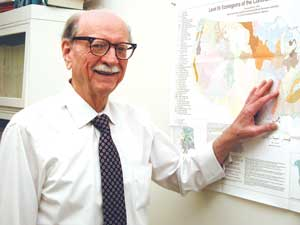
- Born: June 6, 1923; Washington, D.C.
- Died: September 2, 2008 (aged 85); Washington, D.C.
- Known for: Demographer

Calvin Lunsford Beale (June 6, 1923 – September 2, 2008) was an American demographer who specialized in rural demographic trends. He first identified a reverse in population decline in some rural areas, and his work led to the development of the Beale code for categorizing rural development.

== Life and career ==
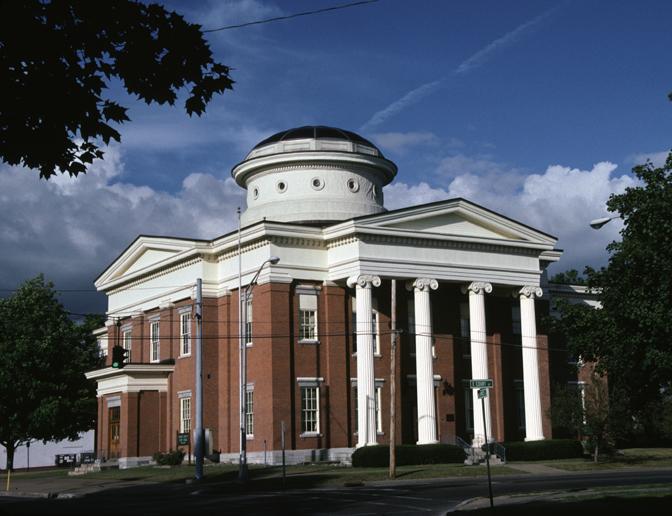
Beale's 1998 photograph of Oneida County Courthouse in Rome, New York

Born in Washington, D.C., Beale graduated from Eastern High School and the Wilson Teachers College.

After earning a master's degree in sociology from the University of Wisconsin, he worked at the United States Department of Agriculture for 50 years.

In addition to his work as a demographer, Beale was noted for his photographs of county courthouses across the United States.

Beale died of colon cancer in Washington, D.C.
