= Concord, Georgia =

- City
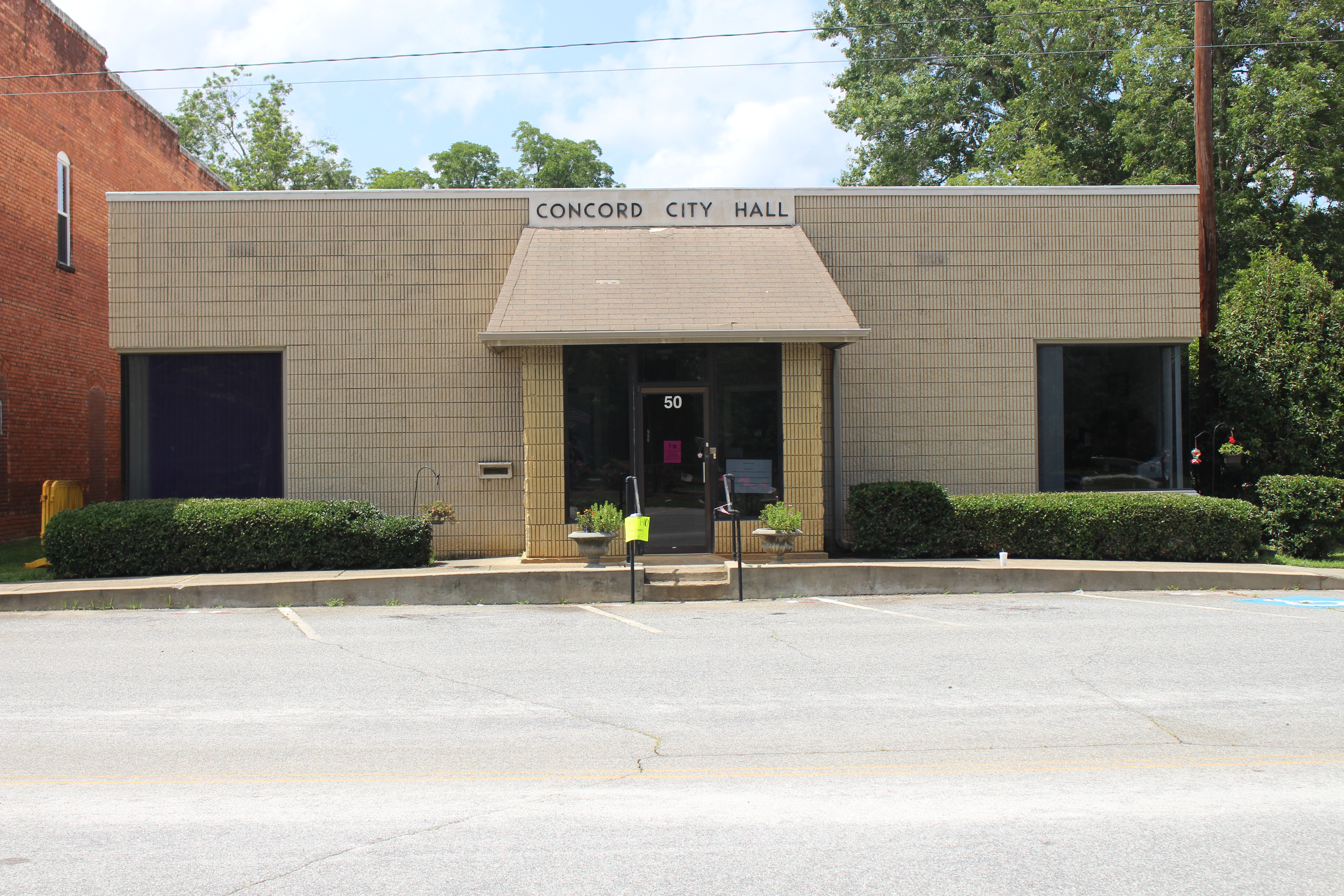
- Concord City Hall

- Location in Pike County and the state of Georgia
- Coordinates: 33°05′28″N 84°26′15″W
- Country: United States
- State: Georgia
- County: Pike

Area
  - Total: 0.85 sq mi (2.20 km^{2})
  - Land: 0.84 sq mi (2.18 km^{2})
  - Water: 0.0077 sq mi (0.02 km^{2})
- Elevation: 810 ft (247 m)

Population (2020)
  - Total: 378
  - Density: 449.3/sq mi (173.46/km^{2})
- Time zone: UTC-5 (Eastern (EST))
  - Summer (DST): UTC-4 (EDT)
- ZIP code: 30206
- Area code: 770
- FIPS code: 13-19168
- GNIS feature ID: 355256
- Website: https://www.cityofconcordga.gov/

Concord is a city in Pike County, Georgia, United States. The population was 378 in 2020.

== History ==
In 1827, Concord was established as a trading post on Whiteoak Creek, serving as a major stop on the stagecoach line between Atlanta and Columbus, and also an important hub for cotton farmers in the region. It was originally incorporated in 1832, but because of the civil war, many of its citizens left the town.

The Georgia General Assembly reincorporated the place in 1887 as the "Town of Concord". The community took its name from the Concord Primitive Baptist Church, which stood at the site since the early 1840s.

== Geography ==
According to the United States Census Bureau, the town has a total area of 0.8 square miles (2.1 km^{2}), all land.

Concord is located on Georgia State Route 18.

== Demographics ==
Historical population
Census	Pop.	Note	%±
1890	360		—
1900	231		−35.8%
1910	450		94.8%
1920	442		−1.8%
1930	447		1.1%
1940	403		−9.8%
1950	360		−10.7%
1960	333		−7.5%
1970	312		−6.3%
1980	317		1.6%
1990	211		−33.4%
2000	336		59.2%
2010	375		11.6%
2020	378		0.8%
U.S. Decennial Census

In 2000, there were 336 people, 118 households, and 92 families residing in the city. In 2020, there were 378 people in the city.

== Education ==
Concord Public Schools are part of the Pike County School District. The school district has one Pre-K building (lottery funded), one primary school (K-2), one elementary school (3–5), one middle school (6–8), a ninth grade academy and one high school.

Michael Duncan is the Superintendent of Schools.

== Notable people ==
- Coleman Crow, MLB pitcher for the Milwaukee Brewers.
