= Coon Creek =

Coon Creek may refer to:

== Settlements ==
- Coon Creek Township, Lyon County, Minnesota

== Watercourses ==
=== In Missouri ===
- Coon Creek (Big Creek tributary)
- Coon Creek (Deane Creek tributary)
- Coon Creek (Lake Taneycomo tributary)
- Coon Creek (Osage River tributary)
- Coon Creek (South Fork Fabius River tributary)
- Coon Creek (Perche Creek tributary)
- Coon Creek (Pettis County, Missouri)
- Coon Creek (Spring River tributary)
- Coon Creek (West Fork Cuivre River tributary)

=== Elsewhere ===
- Coon Creek (Blue Earth River tributary), a stream in Iowa and Minnesota
- Coon Creek (Redwood River tributary), a stream in southern Minnesota
- Coon Creek (Mississippi River tributary), a stream in Minnesota
- Coon Creek (California), a tributary of the Santa Ana River
- Coon Creek (Nebraska), a river in Jefferson County, Nebraska
- Coon Creek (Niobrara River tributary), a stream in Rock County, Nebraska

== Geology ==
- Coon Creek Falls, near Spencer, Tennessee, in Fall Creek Falls State Park
- Coon Creek Formation, a geologic formation located in western Tennessee and extreme northeast Mississippi

== Other ==
- Coon Creek Girls, an all-girl "string band" in the Appalachian style of folk music

== See also ==
- Raccoon Creek (disambiguation)
