= Raccoon Creek =

Raccoon Creek may refer to:

- Raccoon Creek, a tributary of the Coosa River in Alabama
- Raccoon Creek (Chattooga River tributary), a stream in Georgia
- Raccoon Creek (Etowah River tributary), a stream in Georgia
- Raccoon Creek, a tributary of the Elm River (Illinois)
- Raccoon Creek, a tributary of the Kaskaskia River near Walnut Hill, Illinois
- Raccoon Creek, a creek in Maquoketa Caves State Park, Iowa
- Raccoon Creek, a creek along Corridor G in Kentucky
- Raccoon Creek (Missouri), a stream in Missouri
- Raccoon Creek (New Jersey), a tributary of the Delaware River
- Raccoon Creek, a creek near Waynesville, North Carolina; see William Holland Thomas
- Raccoon Creek (Ohio), a tributary of the Ohio River near Carbondale in southern Ohio
  - Raccoon Creek Ecological Management Area, located in Zaleski State Forest in southern Ohio
- Raccoon Creek (Beaver County, Pennsylvania), a stream in Beaver County
- Raccoon Creek (Erie County, Pennsylvania), a creek in Erie County
- Raccoon Creek State Park, Pennsylvania
- Raccoon Creek (Tomhicken Creek), in Luzerne and Schuylkill Counties, Pennsylvania

== See also ==
- Coon Creek (disambiguation)
