= Big Canoe Creek Nature Preserve =

Nature preserve in St. Clair County, Alabama, US

- Interactive map of Big Canoe Creek Nature Preserve
- Location: Springville, St. Clair County, Alabama, United States
- Nearest city: Birmingham
- Coordinates: 33°48′0″N 86°28′45″W
- Area: 422 acres (171 ha)
- Established: February 3, 2024
- Governing body: Alabama Department of Conservation and Natural Resources (Forever Wild Land Trust); managed by the City of Springville
- Website: bigcanoecreekpreserve.org

Big Canoe Creek Nature Preserve is a 422-acre (171 ha) nature preserve on Big Canoe Creek in Springville, St. Clair County, Alabama, United States. The preserve is owned by the state's Forever Wild Land Trust and is managed by the City of Springville with several state and local partners. It opened to the public on February 3, 2024, after more than fifteen years of advocacy and land-acquisition efforts led by local conservationists.

The preserve protects forested uplands and a stretch of Big Canoe Creek, a tributary of the Coosa River, and is home to federally listed threatened and endangered species such as the trispot darter and the Canoe Creek clubshell mussel.

== History ==
In 2008, local residents formed the Friends of Big Canoe Creek in response to a proposed residential development along the creek, and the following year nominated a tract of land for purchase by Alabama's Forever Wild Land Trust, a program administered by the Alabama Department of Conservation and Natural Resources (ADCNR) State Lands Division that acquires land for conservation and public recreation. The Forever Wild Board of Trustees approved the purchase, and the state acquired an initial 382-acre tract in 2018, followed by an additional 40 acres in 2019, bringing the preserve to its current 422 acres.

The City of Springville and several partner agencies began planning public infrastructure for the site after the acquisition. FlowMotion Trail Builders designed the trail system, and crews added an access road and trailhead parking. The Community Foundation of Greater Birmingham awarded the City of Springville a $25,000 grant during its 2018 fall grant cycle to help fund the preserve's entrance. Doug Morrison, a longtime board member of the Friends of Big Canoe Creek, was hired as the preserve's manager in 2022, the same year a groundbreaking ceremony was held for its initial trail. An estimated $1.5 million had been invested in developing the preserve by the time it opened to the public.

The preserve officially opened to the public with a ribbon-cutting ceremony on February 3, 2024, attended by state and local officials. At the opening, ADCNR Commissioner Chris Blankenship said the preserve was "a perfect example of how state and local agencies can partner" to provide wildlife habitat and outdoor recreation.

== Geography and natural features ==
The preserve lies along the south bank of Big Canoe Creek in northern Springville and encompasses forested terrain including the Slab Creek watershed. Its address is 1700 Murphrees Valley Road, Springville, Alabama, approximately 30 miles (48 km) northeast of Birmingham. Vegetation in the preserve includes mountain laurel, oakleaf hydrangea, native azalea, beech, maple, hornbeam, black walnut, and bigleaf magnolia.

Big Canoe Creek has a high level of aquatic biodiversity; more than 50 species of fish have been documented in the creek, along with eight federally listed freshwater mussel species. An 18-mile (29 km) stretch of the creek was designated critical habitat under the Endangered Species Act in 2004, and roughly 80 percent of its main stem remains free-flowing. Notable species found in and around the preserve include the trispot darter (Etheostoma trisella), a fish federally listed as threatened, and the Canoe Creek clubshell (Pleurobema athearni), a freshwater mussel found only in the Big Canoe Creek watershed. Other aquatic species recorded in the creek include the speckled darter, goldstripe darter, longear sunfish, southern studfish, spotted bass, and blacknose dace. Terrestrial wildlife in the preserve includes white-tailed deer, eastern wild turkey, beaver, and various salamander species.

A deteriorating culvert crossing at Goodwins Mill on Big Canoe Creek was replaced with a bridge in January 2026, a project led by the Alabama Rivers and Streams Network with several conservation partners. The work reconnected aquatic habitat for federally listed species including the trispot darter and Canoe Creek clubshell, and combined with an earlier dam removal at the same site in 2013, was expected to reconnect roughly 20 miles (32 km) of previously fragmented stream habitat.

== Recreation ==
Visitors can hike, mountain bike, and ride horses on the preserve's 7.3 miles (11.7 km) of trails. It is open Wednesday through Sunday, with hours that vary by season.
