= Shingle Creek =

Shingle Creek may refer to:

== Places ==
=== Canada ===
- Shingle Creek (British Columbia), a stream in the Okanagan Valley
- Shingle Creek, British Columbia, an unincorporated settlement

=== New Zealand ===
- Shingle Creek, New Zealand, locality in Otago region

=== United States ===
- Shingle Creek (Florida), a stream in Central Florida
- Shingle Creek, Minneapolis, Minnesota, a neighborhood
- Shingle Creek (Mississippi River tributary), a stream in Minnesota

== See also ==
- Shingle Creek Crossing, a shopping center in Brooklyn Center, Minnesota
