= Hickory Log Creek Dam =

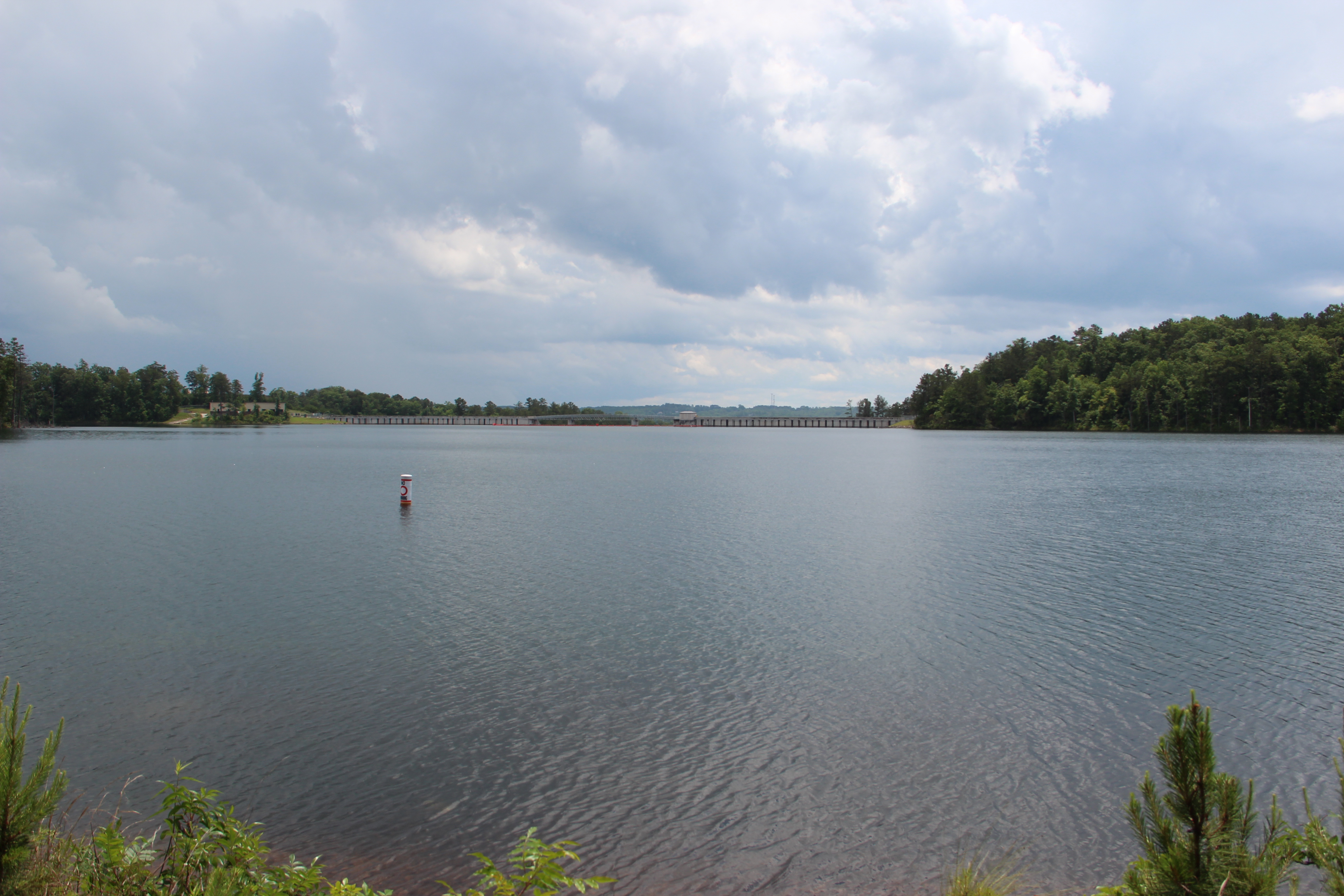
- Hickory Log Creek reservoir

- Location within Georgia
- Interactive map of Hickory Log Creek Dam
- Country: United States
- Location: Cherokee County, Georgia
- Purpose: Water supply
- Status: Operational
- Construction began: October 2005
- Opening date: December 2007
- Owners: 75% Cobb County-Marietta Water Authority; 25% City of Canton

Dam and spillways
- Type of dam: Gravity dam
- Impounds: Hickory Log Creek
- Height (foundation): 180 feet (55 m)
- Length: 956 feet (291 m)
- Width (base): 950 feet (290 m)
- Dam volume: 225,000 cubic yards (172,000 m^{3})
- Spillways: 2
- Spillway type: Open channel
- Spillway length: 250 feet (76 m)
- S pillway volumetric flow rate: 42,000 cubic feet per second (1,200 m^{3}/s)

Reservoir
- Creates: Hickory Log Creek Reservoir
- Total capacity: 5.77 billion US gallons (2.18×10^{10} L; 4.80×10^{9} imp gal)
- Surface area: 411 acres (166 ha)
- Water supply yield: 44 million US gallons per day (170,000,000 L/d)

Hickory Log Creek Dam is a gravity dam on the Hickory Log Creek which runs from northeast and north-central Cherokee County, Georgia, United States, south-southwest to the northeastern part of Canton, the county seat. It is a tributary of the Etowah River, which it meets shortly after crossing under Riverstone Parkway (formerly Ball Ground Highway and Georgia 5).

Since the end of November 2007, a stream gauge (location identifier HLCG1) is located just below the dam, at an elevation of 860 feet (262 m) AMSL (NGVD29). The drainage basin above this point has an area of 8.33 square miles (21.57 km^{2}).

== Dam and reservoir ==
Hickory Log Creek Dam is a 180-foot (55 m) high roller-compacted-concrete dam just north of the Riverstone business district in Canton, and just west of Bluffs Parkway. (34.2671°N 84.4749°W) The city partnered with the Cobb County-Marietta Water Authority (CCMWA) to build the dam. Hickory Log Creek Reservoir is a drought-contingency reservoir which provides an additional source of drinking water for the area.

The dam is approximately 950 feet (290 m) wide, and 180 feet (55 m) high, making it one of largest dams in the state of Georgia not built by the Corps of Engineers or Georgia Power. Construction was completed December 2007, and filling of the reservoir was expected to take another two years.

The reservoir covers 411 acres (1.66 km^{2}) when full, and offers 15 miles (24 km) of shoreline. At capacity, it will hold about 6 billion US gallons (23,000,000 m^{3}) of water. It is permitted for a withdrawal of 39 million US gallons (150,000 m^{3}) per day, which will be shared by Canton and CCMWA. In addition to the dam and reservoir, the project also includes an intake and pump station, plus a pipeline to transport water between the reservoir and the Etowah River.

Several miles of the creek will be submerged, and 411 acres (1.66 km^{2}) of native and mostly hardwood trees are being clear-cut for the lake. It will also receive runoff directly from Bluffs Technology Park, an industrial park constructed immediately to the lake's east along Bluffs Parkway, in what is now forested and very hilly area just west of Interstate 575.

=== Partnership ===
The City of Canton and the CCMWA formed their partnership to meet the long-term water supply needs of the region. All costs of the project are being split 25/75, proportionately to the amount of water to be used by each. 25% of the water will go to Canton, and 75% to Cobb and the parts of the neighboring counties it sells to: south Cherokee, Paulding, and Douglas. This is partially an interbasin water transfer, since most of Cobb and all of Douglas and south Paulding are in the Chattahoochee River basin.

=== Pump station ===
Because the creek is not very large, the pump station will ultimately pull water from the Etowah River and pump it into the Hickory Log Creek Reservoir. A 54-inch (1,400 mm) diameter ductile iron pipe connects the intake to the pump station (located behind the former Waffle House on old highway 5) and then a 42-inch (107 cm) diameter pipe, slightly more than a mile or 1.6 km long, will connect the pump station to the reservoir.

Equipment will include 3-28MKM, five-stage fresh-water vertical turbine pumps, each capable of producing 9,028 US gallons (34,170 L), at 247 or 75.3 meters, at 880 RPM. The units are powered by 700 horsepower (520 kW) high-inertia motors.

=== Water usage ===
The reservoir supplements the city’s existing raw water supply, the Etowah River. Water from the reservoir will go to residents who use the city’s water service and CCMWA’s numerous wholesale customers in the region. Currently, the city serves approximately 6100 customers, and the reservoir is forecast to help Canton continue to meet its water supply needs through 2050, even factoring in growth projections.

=== Alabama permit challenge ===
The reservoir was given a permit by the Corps in 2004, as it is in the headwaters of ACT river basin, its water later flowing into the Coosa River and in turn the Alabama River and Mobile Bay. Despite being nearly complete in late October 2007, the state of Alabama amended its complaint in U.S. federal court against the Corps, trying to force it to revoke the permit and start the entire process over again, giving more consideration to its downstream effect on Alabama.

This particular filing was likely in reaction to Georgia's aggressive actions to keep more water during the drought (in this case, particularly Lake Allatoona not far downstream), but is part of the so-called "tri-state water war" that has been ongoing in court since 1990.

=== Construction information ===
The dam is constructed using roller-compacted concrete or RCC. Overall, the dam's design called for the use of about 225,000 cubic yards or 172,000 cubic meters of RCC. The dam was built by Thalle Construction Co. with assistance from Subcontractor ASI Constructors produced the RCC on-site in a Johnson-Ross batch plant, utilizing aggregate from the nearby Lafarge quarry in Ball Ground, and cement from Signal Mountain Cement Co. Fly ash was also utilized in the mix design. The six-yard (5 m) plant typically produced about 350 cubic yards or 268 cubic meters of RCC per hour.

The mix was delivered to the dam via a conveyor system, manufactured, installed and maintained by Rotec Industries. An initial conveyor run of about 700 feet (210 m) carried the mix from the plant up the hill to a transfer station; from there, a second conveyor transported the mix along the top of the dam to a "tripper". The tripper, which could be positioned along the second conveyor's run, diverted the RCC from the distribution conveyor and discharged it onto the working surface at the desired location.

As the RCC was discharged by the tripper, it was spread in 12-inch (30 cm) lifts by a bulldozer. Initially, during placement of the first lifts of RCC, a small Komatsu D21A bulldozer was used for maximum manoeuvrability. Then, as RCC placement continued and placement rates increased, the team switched to a larger Caterpillar D5MXL and then to an even larger Deere 850 dozer outfitted with wings on the blade. Toward the top of the dam, as the working area began to narrow, the Cat D5MXL was again called into service.

As the dam's elevation increased, the columns supporting the second stage of the conveyor system were raised using hydraulic jacks. Typically, the conveyor was raised about every two days. As the support columns were jacked up, they left behind openings in the RCC which provide drainage or ventilation to the gallery.

After being spread by the dozer, the RCC was compacted by a pair of Ingersoll Rand rollers — a DD125 and, for working close to the edge forms, a DD24. Additionally, vibratory plate compactors were used to compact the mix near the edge forms and around various penetrations.

On the downstream side of the dam, the RCC face will be visible. To enhance the appearance of those faces, the construction team utilized so-called grout-enriched RCC to yield a smoother face. This involved placing uncompacted RCC along the form edges, applying a neat cement grout onto the RCC surface, then vibrating the grout into the RCC to enhance a narrow zone of RCC and thus yield a smooth formed face. Komatsu and Deere loaders were used to transport the facing concrete from ready mix trucks to the locations where it was used.

Much work happened behind the scenes before actual construction on the project began, such as evaluating the dam site and designing the various structures: the dam, intake and pump station, and a pipeline. During the design and construction phases, the project will underwent review by the city, CCMWA and Georgia Safe Dams, which is a program managed by the state Environmental Protection Division. The schedule also included time to hire construction companies to build the projects.

==== Multiple cranes ====
Because of the location and layout of the site, a key factor in maintaining production was ensuring that materials and equipment could be delivered to the dam construction crew where and when they were needed.

To that end, the team utilized four large cranes on the project — a Kobelco 100-ton crane on one end of the dam, a Liebherr 120-ton crane on the other end, a Manitowoc 4100 on the downstream side, and a Manitowoc 888 on the upstream side — as well as smaller cranes and lifts elsewhere as needed. Having multiple cranes on-site allowed maximum lifting flexibility at any point on the dam.

==== Form work ====
The dam is designed with a flat and vertical upstream face and a stepped downstream face. Its downstream steps were formed using wood forms, creating steps with a height of three feet (90 cm). On the upstream side, the team used precast stay-in-place concrete form panels — typically measuring 16 feet (4.9 m) by 6.5 feet (2.0 m) with a thickness of 5 inches (488×198&times13cm) — to define the face of the dam. The inside face of each of these panels is lined with an impervious geomembrane. Crews fabricated and cast these panels at an on-site precast yard.

To anchor these upstream forms during RCC placement and compaction, permanent anchors extending back into the RCC were attached to the inside face of each form panel. Additionally, temporary exterior steel stiffbacks were installed to provide additional support. Overall, the design utilizes close to 1,100 of the panels.

Not all formwork was on the outside of the dam. The Hickory Log Creek dam includes an inspection/drainage gallery which has been constructed deep within the dam itself. This gallery has a width of 7 feet (2.1 m) and a height of 8 feet (2.4 m). The walls were formed during RCC placement using removable metal forms; gallery ceiling was constructed using precast reinforced concrete roof panels. Access stairways have also been incorporated into the mass structure. The presence of these openings and passages complicated construction somewhat but allows for easy instrumentation, drainage from the foundation drains and interior inspection of the structure.

==== Temperature issues ====
Temperature is a concern during any Dam project, particularly one such as this where such a large volume of roller-compacted concrete or RCC is being placed. RCC produces heat as it hydrates and cures, and that heat can cause cracking if it is excessive.

To avoid overheating problems, RCC placement was scheduled to avoid the heat of day. Placement typically began at about 5PM (17:00) and continued through the night, wrapping up mid-morning before temperatures got too high.

Temperature management was further aided by the fact that most of the aggregate was stockpiled last winter, during cold weather. The core of the aggregate pile remained cool even as the weather warmed — an additional aid in controlling mix temperature. Should ambient temperatures have risen too much, the team had the ability to add liquid nitrogen to the mix to lower the temperature further.

Temperature was also a major factor in determining whether bedding mortar was used between each placement session. Although bedding mortar was used in a narrow zone on the upstream side and at each abutment contact at the beginning of each day's RCC placement, it was only necessary to bed the entire lift if the "degree-hours" (that is, the product of the temperature and time between lifts) exceeded 500 degree hours.
