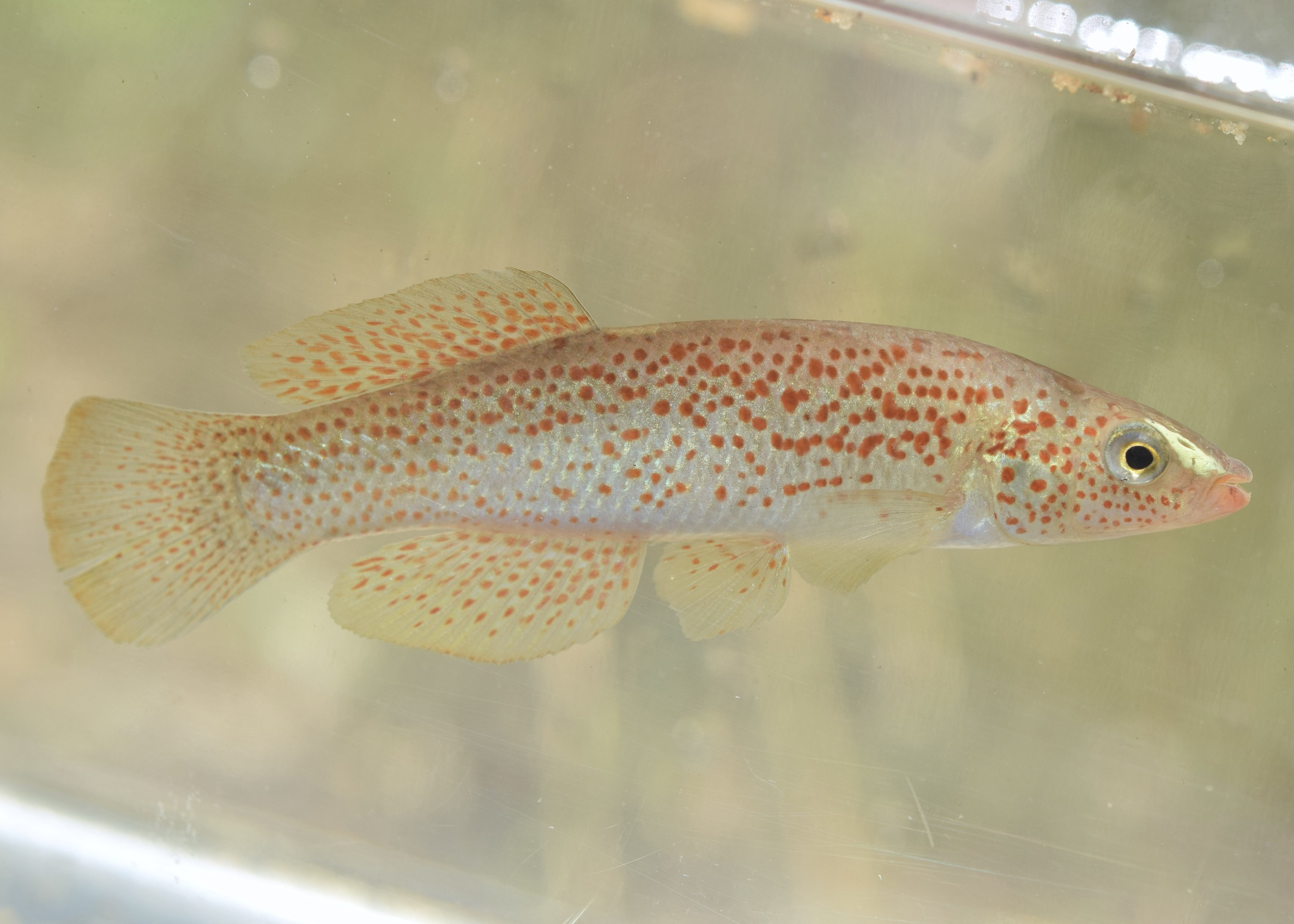

Conservation status
- Least Concern (IUCN 3.1)

Scientific classification
- Kingdom: Animalia
- Phylum: Chordata
- Class: Actinopterygii
- Order: Cyprinodontiformes
- Family: Fundulidae
- Genus: Fundulus
- Species: F. stellifer

Binomial name
- Fundulus stellifer (Jordan, 1877)

Synonyms
- Xenisma stellifera Jordan, 1877; Fundulus stelliferus Jordan, 1877

= Southern studfish =

Species of fish

The southern studfish (Fundulus stellifer) is a ray-finned fish of the family Fundulidae, the tooth carps, that is native to the southeastern United States.

== Description ==
The southern studfish is 2.2 to 3.9 inches (5.6 to 9.9 cm) long. The male has elongated posterior dorsal fin rays that may extend to the base of the caudal fin. The dorsal fin in both sexes begins almost directly above the anal fin, with 12–13 rays present in each. The coloration of the breeding male is striking, with distinct orange spots irregularly speckling the entire body and extending to the head and fin bases. The body color may be iridescent blue, with gold appearance in the vicinity of the opercula. A variable black margin may be present on the pale dorsal and caudal fins, and they, with the anal, also bear orange spots.

The female has rows of irregular olive-colored spots that are smaller than the orange spots of the breeding male. The fins in the female are olive, rather than pale orange.

Jordan (1876) reported that he observed "a large pale yellow blotch" on the backs of living specimens in front of the dorsal fin. He could recognize this killifish in the water by looking for this marking.

== Distribution ==
The southern studfish has its historical distribution in the upland tributaries of the Alabama River in Alabama (except the Tallapoosa River system); in northern Georgia, in a few of the headwater tributaries of the Chattahoochee River; in the upper Chattahoochee River drainages in northern Alabama and southeastern Tennessee; and the Tennessee and Cumberland River drainages in eastern Tennessee.

Currently, the studfish still occupies all the historical distribution areas and seems to be holding a sustainable population in comparison to the northern studfish (Fundulus catenatus), which is seemingly being replaced in these areas. The decrease in some small areas, although not significant, as in Alabama, and the failure to collect additional specimens from previous samples may indicate this species has been extirpated from the Cahaba River system. The southern studfish is also thought to be replaced in the Tallapoosa River system by the stippled studfish (Fundulus bifax). The cause of this decline is the increase in road runoff into these waterways and competition for food and breeding areas.

== Ecology ==
Some abiotic factors that may affect this species include the very limited geographic distribution and preferred characteristics of the environment of southern studfish, especially with respect to water temperature, dissolved oxygen concentration, and salinity. Ambient temperature is often thought of as a key abiotic condition influencing the distribution and abundance of aquatic organisms, increasing the areas suitable for laying eggs. This is due to its pervasive increase of chemical activity with temperature. However, both ambient temperature and salinity are key factors in the success of this species because of their effects on distributions of aquatic organisms. Some human influences on abiotic factors include the alteration of road crossings and urbanization of runoff areas. These factors affect both the structure of the aquatic habitat and the biology of the habitat.

=== Prey and predators ===
The southern studfish's larger crushing teeth are correlated with its diet of 80% mollusks and crustaceans, although the younger specimens collected also contained small insects and invertebrates. The development of their teeth is a key factor in the diet of the species; as an individual matures, it will go through an ontogenetic shift in diet. The amount of food consumed is greatest in the months preceding and during spawning, and lowest during fall and early winter. This species' direct competitors are other top minnows and killifish also native to these areas, such as the central stoneroller (Campostoma anomalum), the coosa darter (Etheostoma coosae), and the trispot darter (Etheostoma trisella). The predators of this species are in the families Centrarchidae (in particular, the genus Micropterus) and Percidae.

== Life history ==
This species prefers margins, pools, and backwaters of creeks and small rivers, with moderate to high gradients, a permanent flow of clear water, and the bottom usually consisting of sand, gravel, rock, and occasionally an admixture of silt. F. stellifer is most commonly found in shallow, sandy backwaters near clear creeks with gravel bottoms. Males establish and defend small territories in shallow, quiet-water spawning areas. Spawning occurs between late April and early June. This species does not migrate or prepare a nest. Sexual maturity is reached in the second full spawning season for both sexes, with females having a maximum ovum diameter of 2.75 mm. The average size of this species is 8.01 cm. Maximum age appears to be just over two years for both sexes, as the oldest specimens collected were estimated at 28 months of age. Although this species is not migratory, its distribution is affected by the alterations of road crossings mentioned by a study done in north Georgia on the Etowah Basin streams. These alterations affect the structure of these aquatic ecosystems, changing how these species travel, eat, and spawn.

== Management ==
One major management effort to protect the southern studfish and other killifish and top water minnows located in Alabama focuses on the watershed features and current biological and habitat conditions of Hatchet Creek. This management effort was established by the Alabama Department of Environmental Management with the support of the Geological Survey of Alabama. The focus of this effort is to research and develop strategies of future management based on water quality variation, stream hydrology, watershed features, land-use patterns, and biological conditions.
