= Shingle Run =

Shingle Run may refer to:

- Shingle Run (Huntington Creek), in Luzerne County, Pennsylvania
- Shingle Run (West Branch Run), in Columbia County, Pennsylvania
- Shingle Run (Dark Shade Creek) in Somerset County, Pennsylvania
- Shingle Run (Bear Creek) im Lycoming County, Pennsylvania

== See also ==
- Shingle Creek (disambiguation)
- Shingle (disambiguation)
