= Coon Creek (Mississippi River tributary) =

Metro Minnesota Watershed

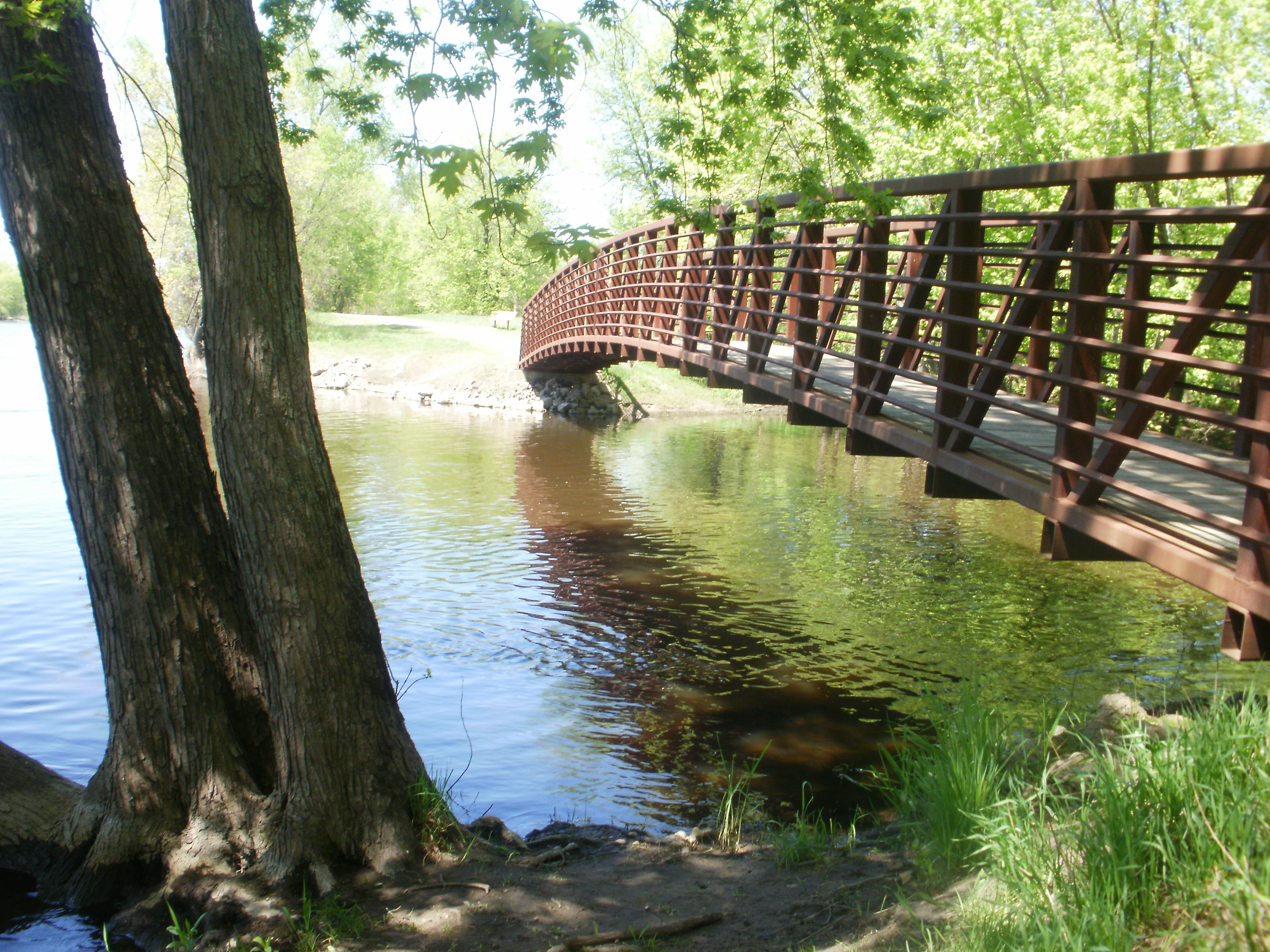
- Native name: Pteġa Wakpadaƞ (Dakota)

Physical characteristics
- Source: Carlos Avery State Wildlife Management Area
- Mouth
  - coordinates: 45°08′00″N 93°17′58″W
- Basin size: 107 miles (172 km)
- Discharge
  - location: Mississippi River

Basin features
- River system: Mississippi River

Coon Creek (Dakota: Pteġa Wakpadaƞ) is a stream in Anoka County that is a tributary of the Mississippi River. It is named for the large population of racoons in the area. The mouth of the river is located near the Coon Creek Rapids of the Mississippi river.

== Watershed ==
The 107 square-mile watershed of the stream includes the cities of Coon Rapids, Fridley, Blaine, Andover, Ham Lake, and Columbus. The Coon Creek Watershed District was founded in 1959 for the purpose of flood control.

== History ==
Coon Creek was first noted by Europeans in 1836/7 by Joseph Nicollet. Nicollet noted the creek on the map as "Peterah", a reference to its Dakota name, Pteġa Wakpadaƞ which can be translated as "Marshy Creek". The name Coon Creek originates from the large number of raccoons hunted in the 19th century at the mouth of the creek.

== See also ==
- Shingle Creek (Mississippi River tributary)
- Bassett Creek (Mississippi River tributary)
- Minnehaha Creek
- Coon Creek (Blue Earth River tributary)
- Coon Creek (Redwood River tributary)
