= Raccoon Creek (Chattooga River tributary) =

Stream in Georgia, USA

Raccoon Creek Tributary to Chattooga River
- Location of Raccoon Creek mouth Raccoon Creek (Chattooga River tributary) (the United States)

Location
- Country: United States
- State: Georgia
- County: Chattooga

Physical characteristics
- Source: Teloga Creek divide
  - location: about 3 miles southeast of Neal Crossing, Georgia
  - coordinates: 34°32′6.30″N 085°23′8.85″W
  - elevation: 930 ft (280 m)
- Mouth: Chattooga River
  - location: about 2 miles northeast of Lyerly, Georgia
  - coordinates: 34°25′43.32″N 085°22′24.85″W
  - elevation: 604 ft (184 m)
- Length: 10.79 mi (17.36 km)
- Basin size: 29.31 square miles (75.9 km^{2})
- Discharge
  - location: Chattooga River
  - average: 53.07 cu ft/s (1.503 m^{3}/s) at mouth with Chattooga River

Basin features
- Progression: Chattooga River → Coosa River → Alabama River → Mobile River → Gulf of Mexico
- River system: Chattooga
- Bridges: Jenny Marie Lane, Chelsea Lane, Williams Road, Calland Drive, Beavers Road, Hair Lake Road, GA 48, Back Berryton Road, GA 114

Raccoon Creek is a stream in the U.S. state of Georgia. It is a tributary to the Chattooga River.

Raccoon Creek took its name from an old Cherokee settlement near its course called "Raccoon Town".
