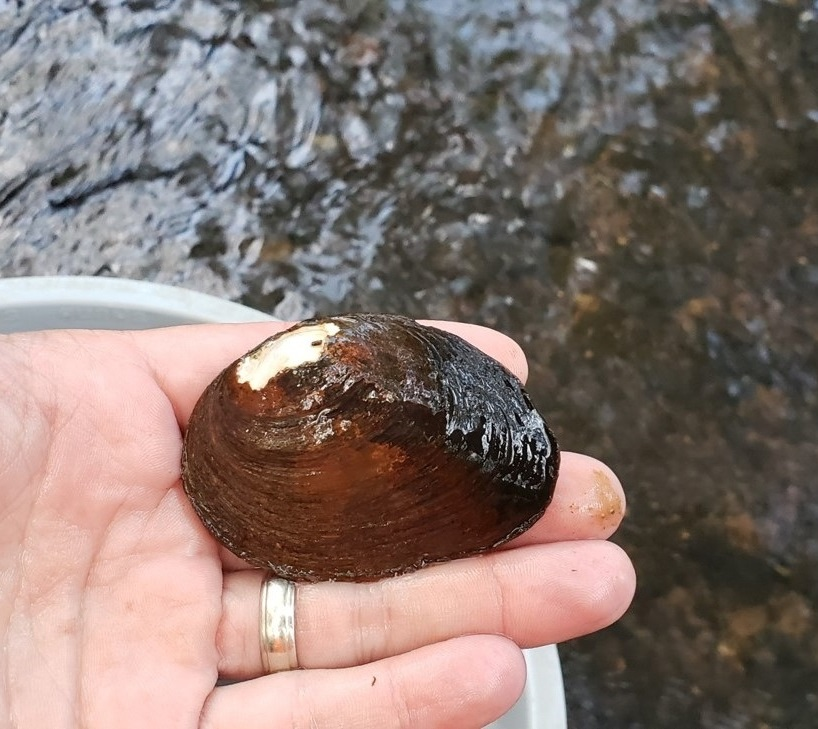

Conservation status
- Data Deficient (IUCN 3.1)

- Endangered (ESA)

Scientific classification
- Kingdom: Animalia
- Phylum: Mollusca
- Class: Bivalvia
- Order: Unionida
- Family: Unionidae
- Genus: Pleurobema
- Species: P. athearni

Binomial name
- Pleurobema athearni (Gangloff, Williams & Feminella, 2006)

= Canoe Creek clubshell =

Species of bivalve

The Canoe Creek clubshell (Pleurobema athearni), also known as the Canoe Creek pigtoe, is an endangered species of freshwater mussel, an aquatic bivalve mollusc in the family Unionidae, the river mussels.

This species is endemic to the United States, only occurring in Alabama in the watershed of Big Canoe Creek, a tributary of the Coosa River.

The U.S. Fish and Wildlife Service listed the species as endangered in July 2022.
