= Pumpkinvine Creek =

Stream in Georgia, U.S.

Coordinates: 34°07′26″N 84°48′12″W

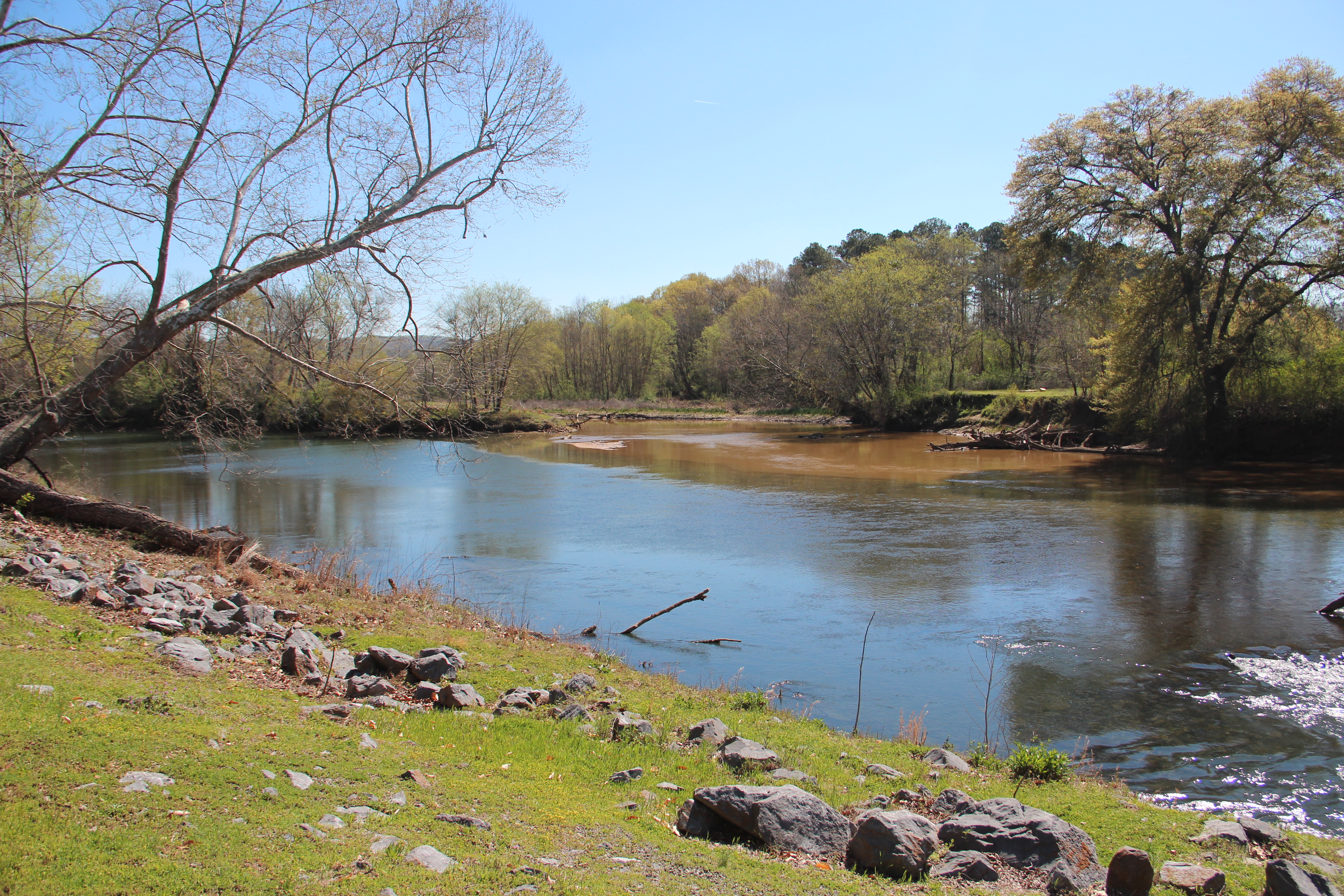
Confluence of Pumpkinvine Creek and the Etowah River

Pumpkinvine Creek is a stream in the U.S. state of Georgia. It is a tributary of the Etowah River.

Pumpkinvine might be the English translation of a Cherokee name.

== See also ==
- List of rivers of Georgia (U.S. state)
