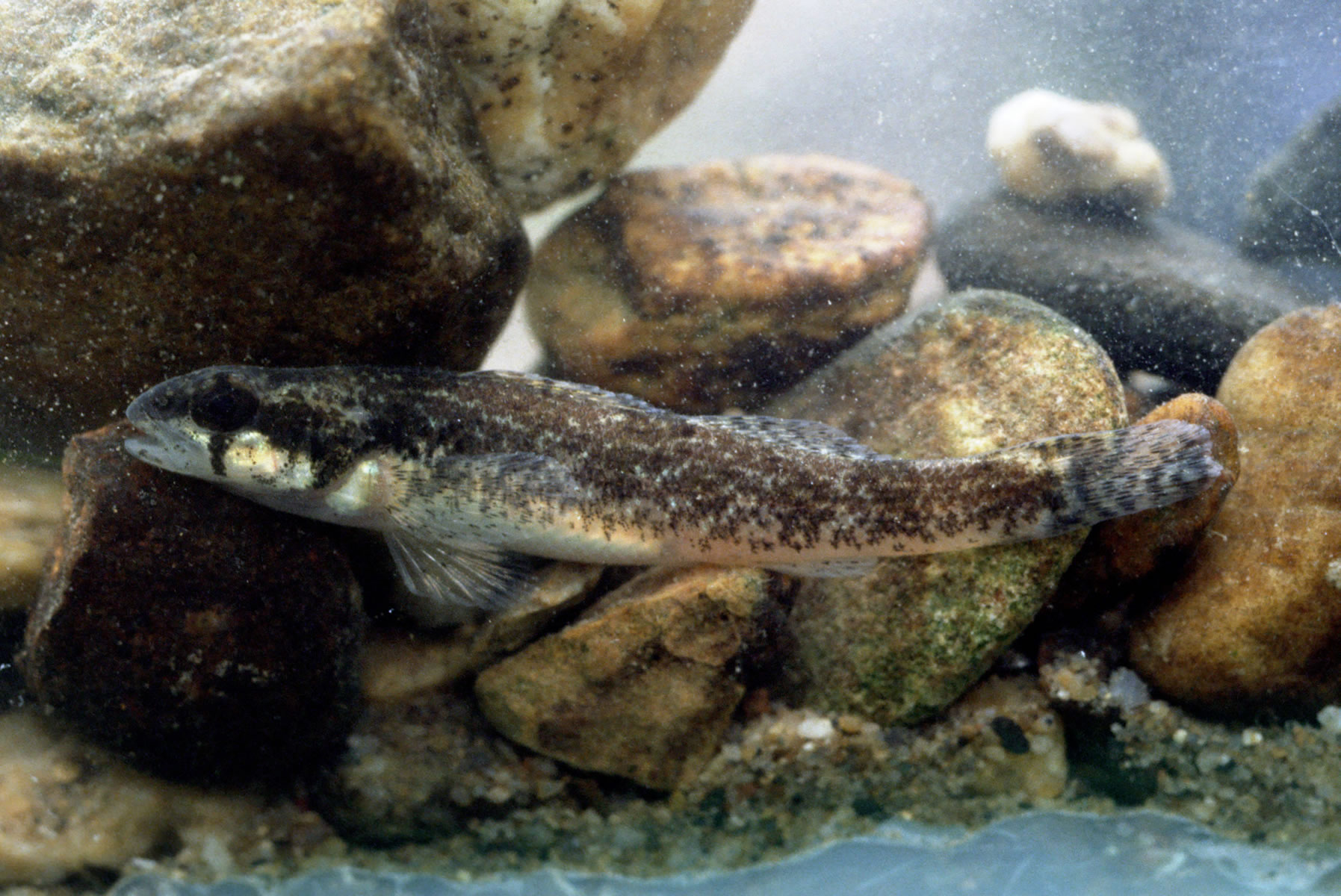

Conservation status
- Vulnerable (IUCN 3.1)

- Threatened (ESA)

Scientific classification
- Kingdom: Animalia
- Phylum: Chordata
- Class: Actinopterygii
- Order: Perciformes
- Family: Percidae
- Genus: Etheostoma
- Species: E. trisella

Binomial name
- Etheostoma trisella R. M. Bailey & Richards, 1963

= Trispot darter =

Species of fish

The trispot darter (Etheostoma trisella) is a species of freshwater ray-finned fish, a darter from the subfamily Etheostomatinae, part of the family Percidae, which also contains the perches, ruffes and pikeperches. It is endemic to northern Georgia and southern Tennessee in the United States, where it occurs in the Conasauga River and its tributaries and historically in the Alabama River system. It requires two interconnecting habitats; outside the breeding season it occupies the peripheral zones of the main river, with slow-moving water and silt gravel substrates with vegetation cover; during the breeding season it moves to warmer water with a clay-bottomed substrate with much vegetation. The population of this fish is declining due to loss of suitable habitat because of stream impoundment and land development. The International Union for Conservation of Nature has assessed its conservation status as being "vulnerable".

== Distribution ==
The trispot darter is endemic to the Conasauga River and its tributaries located in northern Georgia and southern Tennessee. The species was thought to be extinct from its historical range for seven years, until a specimen was found in north Georgia in 1967. The historical range was in the Alabama River system and as far south as the Coosa River, and in some Georgia rivers. The species also was found in a reservoir, Lake Weiss. Other recent efforts to find the darter have not been successful; it is now only found in the Conasauga and in Alabama's Big Canoe Creek. The reason for the decline in distribution is thought to be due to human impact and development. Silt in water affects egg survival, and correct water temperature is vital for the species' breeding. The Conasauga River offers the critical, undisturbed habitat for the species.

== Habitat and ecology ==
E. trisella requires two separate but interconnected habitats. When not breeding, it occupies the peripheral zones of the main river, with slow-moving water and silt gravel substrates with vegetation cover. The breeding habitat is much warmer water (water at 12 °C (54 °F) is best for egg maturation), and usually is a clay-bottomed substrate with heavy vegetation seepage.

Chironomidae larvae account for 70% of the diet of this darter; Ephemeroptera nymphs account for another 19%, as measured by examining the fish's stomach contents. The species coexists with several other species in its habitat, such as the central stoneroller (Campostoma anomalum), southern studfish (Fundulus stellifer), and Coosa darter (Etheostoma coosae). The species' only real competitor is the Coosa darter, because its mouth size and body length allow it to be a threat for food and space. The main natural predators of the species are from the black basses (genus Micropterus). The average standard length of the fish is 35 millimeters (1.4 in).

== Life history ==
The trispot darter has an average life span around 2.5 years.

They spawn around January through March, when males' skin becomes brilliantly pigmented. The skin color is thought to attract mates. Egg clutch numbers vary from 50 to 300 eggs per female.

== Conservation and management ==
The species is listed as being threatened with extinction and is on the decline. Loss of habitat through land development and stream impoundment is the primary reason for the species' decline.
