= Canton Creek =

Stream in Georgia, U.S.

Coordinates: 34°13′44″N 84°29′45″W

Canton Creek is a stream in the U.S. state of Georgia. It is a tributary to the Etowah River.

Canton Creek flows through the city of Canton, Georgia, from which it takes its name.
