= Etowah River =

River in Georgia, U.S.

Coordinates: 34°15′14″N 85°10′36″W

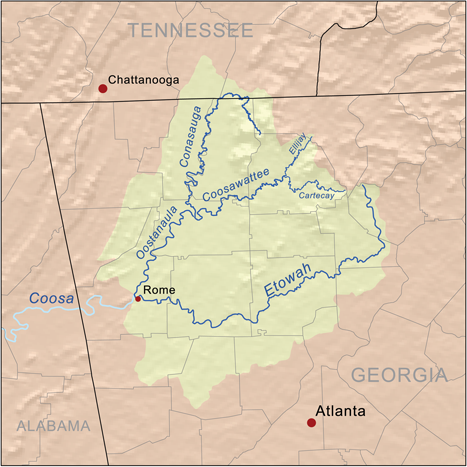

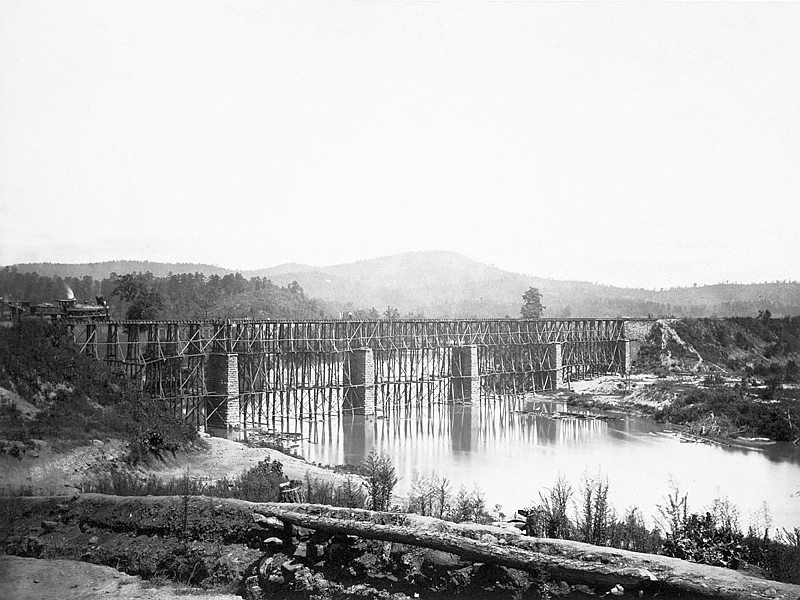
Railroad Bridge across Etowah River, c. 1865

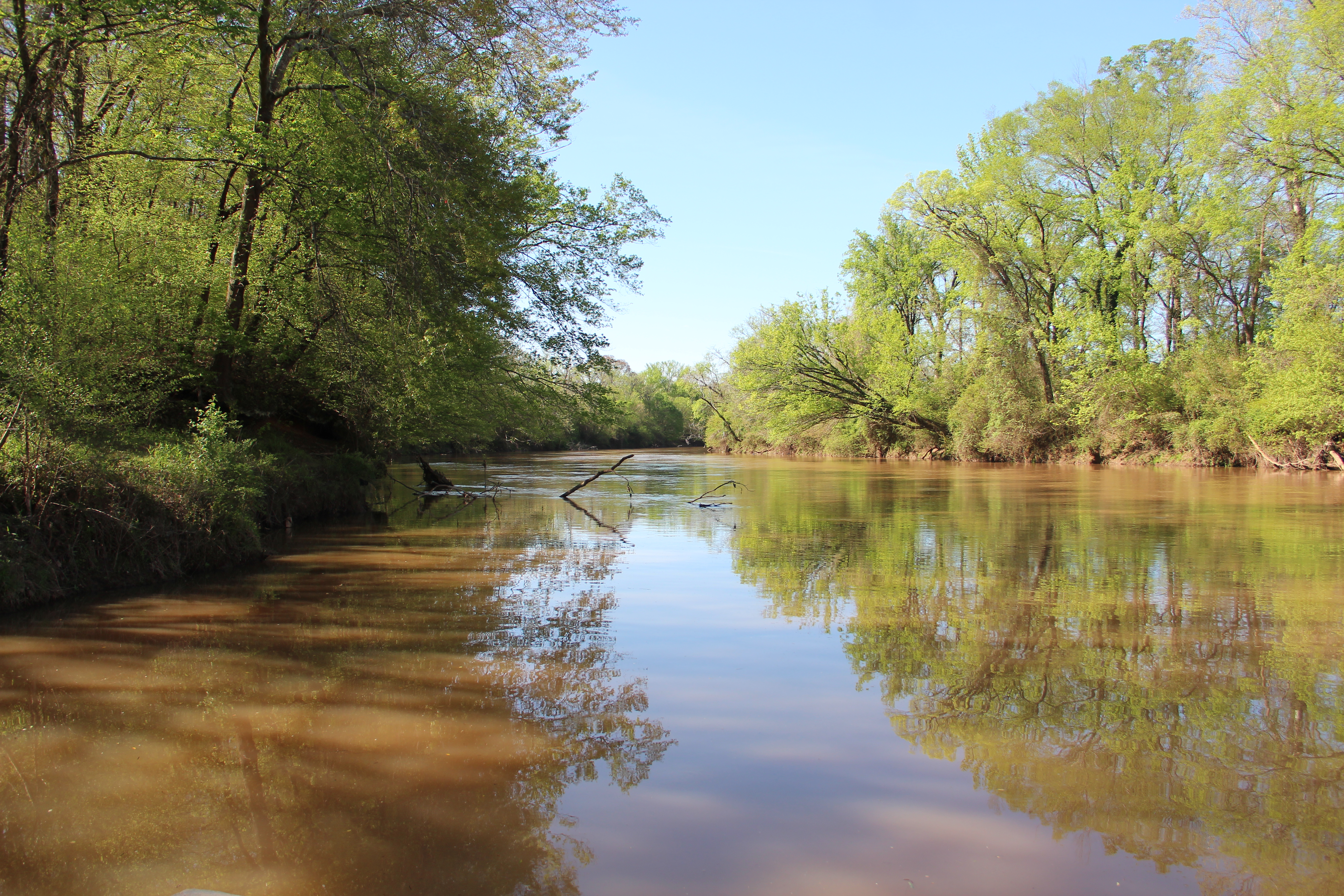
Etowah River in Bartow County, Georgia

The Etowah River is a 164-mile-long (264 km) waterway that rises northwest of Dahlonega, Georgia, north of Atlanta. On Matthew Carey's 1795 map the river was labeled "High Town River". On later maps, such as the 1839 Cass County map (Cass being the original name for Bartow County), it was referred to as "Hightower River", a name that was used in most early Cherokee records.

The large Amicalola Creek (which flows over Amicalola Falls) is a primary tributary near the beginning of the river. The Etowah then flows west-southwest through Canton, Georgia, and soon forms Lake Allatoona. From the dam at the lake, it passes Cartersville and the Etowah Indian Mounds archaeological site. It then flows to Rome, Georgia, where it meets the Oostanaula River and forms the Coosa River at their confluence. The river is the northernmost portion of the Etowah-Coosa-Alabama-Mobile Waterway, stretching from the mountains of north Georgia to Mobile Bay in Alabama.

The Little River is the largest tributary of the Etowah, their confluence now flooded by Lake Allatoona. Allatoona Creek is another major tributary, flowing north from Cobb County and forming the other major arm of the lake.

The U.S. Board on Geographic Names officially named the river in 1897.

The river ends at 571 feet (174 m) above mean sea level.

The river is home to the Cherokee darter and Etowah darter, which are listed on the Endangered Species List.

Country singer-songwriter Jerry Reed made the Etowah the home of the wild, misunderstood swamp dweller Ko-Ko Joe in the 1971 song "Ko-Ko Joe". The fictional character, who is reviled by respectable people but apparently dies a hero while saving a child's life, is alternately known as the "Etowah River Swamp Rat" in the song. Reed, a native of Atlanta, took some liberties with Georgia geography in the song, including the non-existent "Appaloosa County" and "Ko-Ko Ridge" as part of the song narrative’s setting.

== Principal tributaries ==
- Acworth Creek
- Allatoona Creek
- Amicalola River
- Big Dry Creek
- Boston Creek
- Butler Creek
- Cane Creek
- Canton Creek
- Clark Creek
- Connesena Creek
- Downing Creek
- Dykes Creek
- Euharlee Creek
- Hall Creek
- Hickory Log Creek
- Hurricane Creek
- Illinois Creek
- Kellogg Creek
- Little Allatoona Creek
- Little River
- Long Swamp Creek
- McKaskey Creek
- Noonday Creek
- Owl Creek
- Pettit Creek
- Pumpkinvine Creek
- Raccoon Creek
- Rocky Creek
- Rubes Creek
- Shoal Creek
- Sixes Creek
- Settin Down Creek
- Stamp Creek
- Tanyard Creek
- Two Run Creek

== Places ==
- Lumpkin County, Georgia
  - Dahlonega
- Dawson County, Georgia
  - Dawsonville
- Forsyth County, Georgia
- Cherokee County, Georgia
  - Canton
- Bartow County, Georgia
  - Cartersville
- Floyd County, Georgia
  - Rome
