= Coldwater darter =

Conservation status
- Endangered (IUCN 3.1)

Scientific classification
- Kingdom: Animalia
- Phylum: Chordata
- Class: Actinopterygii
- Order: Perciformes
- Family: Percidae
- Genus: Etheostoma
- Species: E. ditrema

Binomial name
- Etheostoma ditrema Ramsey & Suttkus, 1965

Species of fish

The coldwater darter (Etheostoma ditrema) is a species of freshwater ray-finned fish, a darter from the subfamily Etheostomatinae, part of the family Percidae, which also contains the perches, ruffes and pikeperches. It is endemic to the United States, where it occurs in the Coosa River system of Georgia, Alabama, and Tennessee.

== Description ==
The coldwater darter has a dark brown back which is mottled and has nine saddle-like blotches which vary in resolution. The flanks have irregular brown mottling, and some individuals show darker centers which create horizontal lines, There are three spots arranged one on top of the other at the base of the caudal fin and there is usually a dark bar below the eye. The dorsal and caudal fins are marked with dark spots on their rays, and these vary in extent on the rays of the remaining fins In breeding males, the color of the belly changes to scarlet and reddish spots develop on the flanks. The spiny part of the dorsal fin has a bluish ban on the margin and in the middle with red bands alternating with these. The soft-rayed portion of the dorsal fin is transparent but may show a slight bluish tinge and it has a row of reddish spots along the centre and the base. The anal fin is bluish with a scattering of black and reddish spots along its base. The red and blue colours of the males are intensified during the spawning season. The coldwater darter can reach a length of 5.4 cm (2.1 in), though most only reach about 3 cm (1.2 in).

== Distribution ==
The coldwater darter is endemic to the Coosa River drainage covering the Ridge and Valley Province above the Fall Line in northeastern Alabama, northwestern Georgia, and the extreme southeast of Tennessee.

== Habitat and ecology ==
The coldwater darter is restricted to pools and streams that are fed by springs and they are usually found among underwater vegetation in water less than a meter deep. Aquatic moss, watercress, and milfoil are common habitats for the coldwater darter, as they perch on the clumps of vegetation.

== Taxonomy ==
The coldwater darter was first formally described in 1965 by John S. Ramsey and Royal Dallas Suttkus with the type locality given as a tributary of Mills Creek which is a tributary of the Chattooga River, 4.3 miles (6.9 km) west of Lyerly, Georgia. It is regarded as a member of the subgenus Oligocephalus and it is thought that its closest relative is the Gulf darter (E. swaini). There is also some evidence that this is a species complex and it may be split into two or more species in future.
