= Coon Creek Township, Lyon County, Minnesota =

Coon Creek Township, Minnesota
- Township
- Location within the state of Minnesota Coon Creek Township, Minnesota (the United States)
- Coordinates: 44°19′11″N 96°0′30″W
- Country: United States
- State: Minnesota
- County: Lyon

Area
  - Total: 36.4 sq mi (94.3 km^{2})
  - Land: 35.9 sq mi (93.0 km^{2})
  - Water: 0.54 sq mi (1.4 km^{2})
- Elevation: 1,601 ft (488 m)

Population (2000)
  - Total: 282
  - Density: 7.8/sq mi (3/km^{2})
- Time zone: UTC-6 (Central (CST))
  - Summer (DST): UTC-5 (CDT)
- FIPS code: 27-13078
- GNIS feature ID: 0663865

Coon Creek Township is a township in Lyon County, Minnesota, United States. The population was 282 at the 2000 census.

Coon Creek Township was organized in 1883, and named for Coon Creek.

== Geography ==
According to the United States Census Bureau, the township has a total area of 36.4 square miles (94 km^{2}), of which 35.9 square miles (93 km^{2}) is land and 0.5 square miles (1.3 km^{2}) (1.43%) is water.

== Demographics ==
As of the census of 2000, there were 282 people, 98 households, and 79 families residing in the township. The population density was 7.9/mi^{2} (3.0/km^{2}). There were 101 housing units at an average density of 2.8/mi^{2} (1.1/km^{2}). The racial makeup of the township was 97.16% White, 0.35% African American, and 2.48% from two or more races. Hispanic or Latino of any race were 0.35% of the population.

There were 98 households, out of which 40.8% had children under the age of 18 living with them, 71.4% were married couples living together, 5.1% had a female householder with no husband present, and 18.4% were non-families. 18.4% of all households were made up of individuals, and 6.1% had someone living alone who was 65 years of age or older. The average household size was 2.88 and the average family size was 3.25.

In the township the population was spread out, with 31.2% under the age of 18, 5.3% from 18 to 24, 25.2% from 25 to 44, 24.8% from 45 to 64, and 13.5% who were 65 years of age or older. The median age was 39 years. For every 100 females, there were 95.8 males. For every 100 females age 18 and over, there were 96.0 males.

The median income for a household in the township was $42,083, and the median income for a family was $45,568. Males had a median income of $23,438 versus $21,000 for females. The per capita income for the township was $14,150. About 5.9% of families and 6.1% of the population were below the poverty line, including 10.0% of those under the age of eighteen and 11.1% of those 65 or over.
