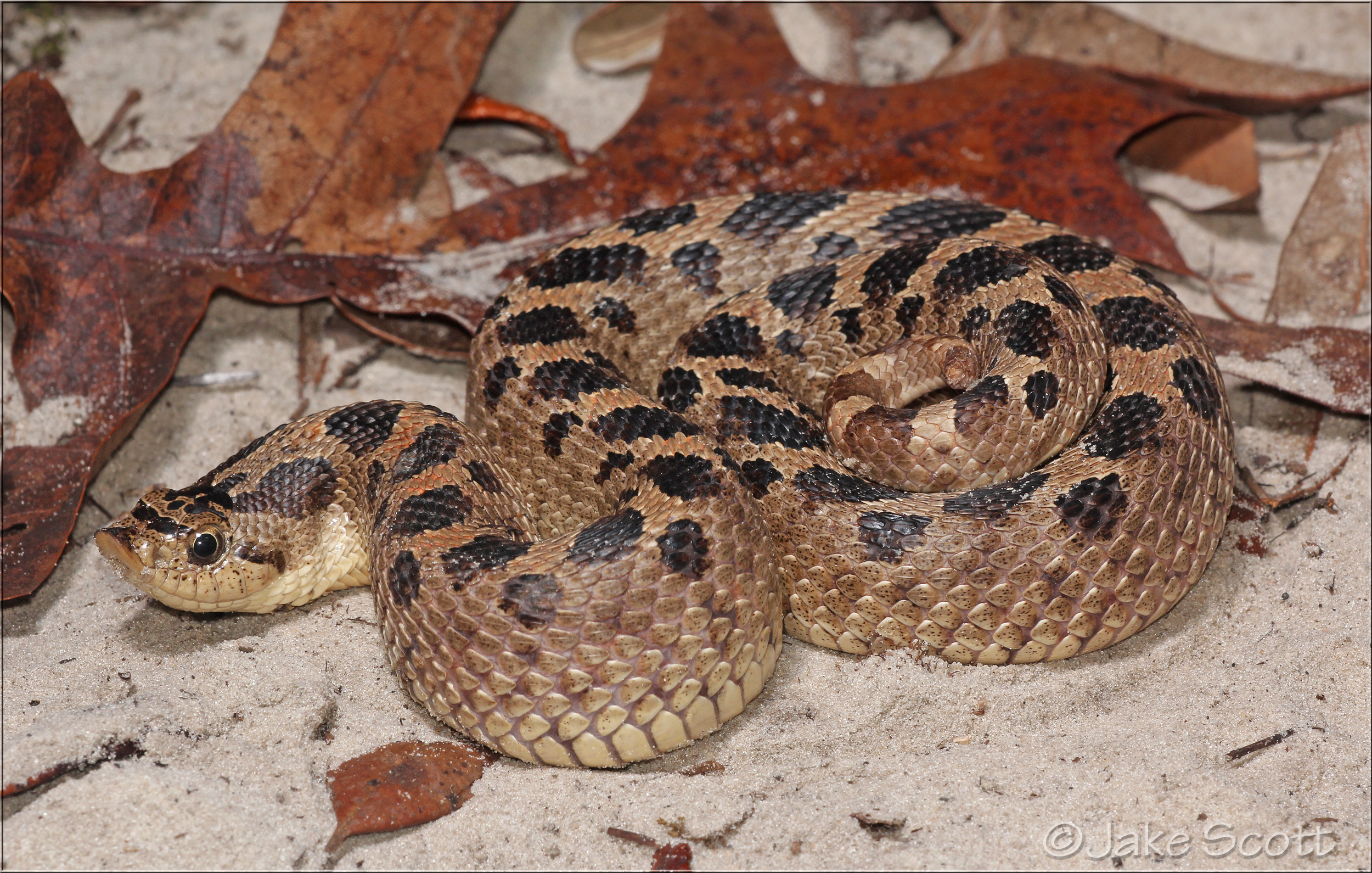
- Adult southern hog-nosed snake
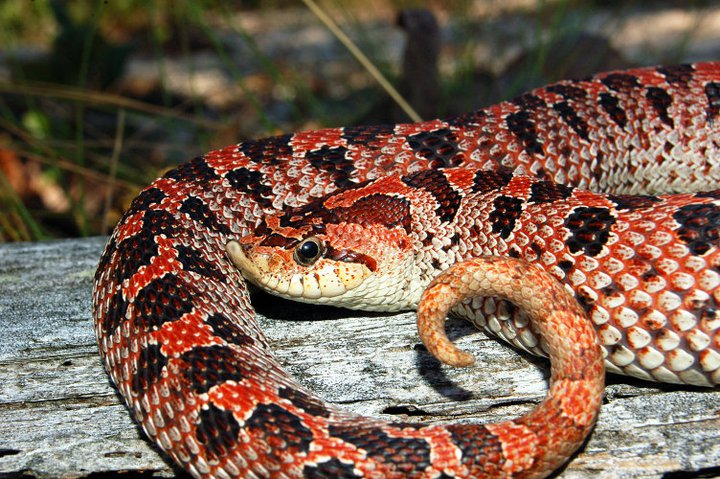
- Red phase southern hog-nosed snake

Conservation status
- Vulnerable (IUCN 3.1)

- Vulnerable (NatureServe)

Scientific classification
- Kingdom: Animalia
- Phylum: Chordata
- Class: Reptilia
- Order: Squamata
- Suborder: Serpentes
- Family: Colubridae
- Genus: Heterodon
- Species: H. simus

Binomial name
- Heterodon simus (Linnaeus, 1766)
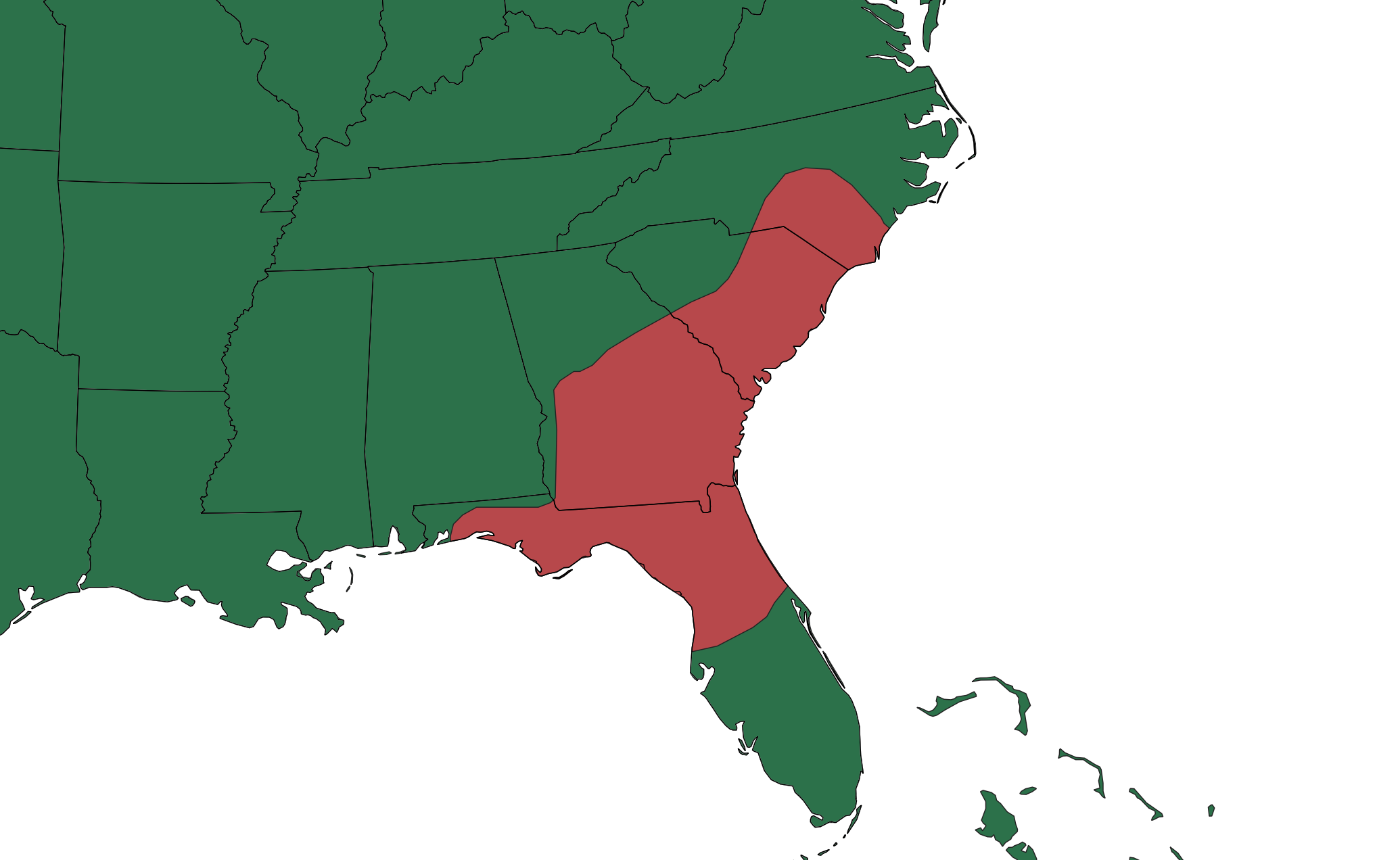

Synonyms
- Coluber simus Linnaeus, 1766; Heterodon simus — Holbrook, 1842

= Southern hognose snake =

Species of snake

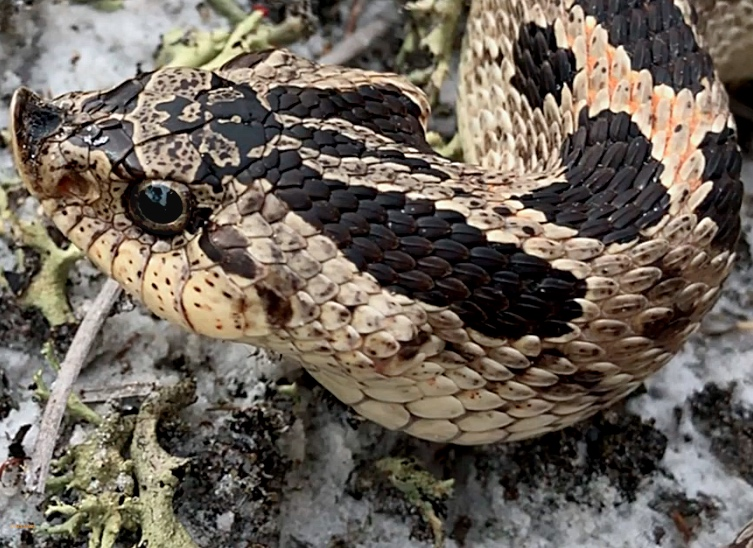
Adult Southern Hognose Snake, H. Simus

Heterodon simus, commonly known as the southern hog-nosed snake, is a harmless snake species endemic to the southeastern United States. No subspecies are currently recognized.

== Description ==
Adults are 35.5–61 cm (14–24 inches) in total length. Stout with a wide neck and a sharply upturned snout, they usually have 25 rows of keeled dorsal scales at midbody.

The dorsal color pattern consists of a light brown, yellowish, grayish, or reddish ground color, overlaid with a distinct row of dark blotches that alternate with smaller blotches on the flanks. The belly is distinctly darker in color than the underside of the tail in juveniles. As the snake ages, the underside usually becomes a pale white.

== Habitat ==
The native habitats of Heterodon simus are xeric grasslands such as longleaf pine sandhill, upland pine forest, and scrubby flatwoods. In some areas, populations persist in mosaics of overgrown pastures, dry river floodplains, fields, and pine plantation.

== Geographic range ==
The southern hognose snake is found on the coastal plain of the southeastern United States from North Carolina, south to Lake Okeechobee in Florida, and west to Mississippi.

== Diet ==
Heterodon simus preys mainly upon spadefoot toads and true toads. It also preys on salamanders, other frogs, lizards, small mammals, and rarely, large invertebrates.

== Reproduction ==
This species is oviparous. Mature adults mate from April through August. The thin-shelled, leathery, whitish eggs are laid in clutches of 6-14. After 55–60 days the eggs hatch. Each hatchling is 15–18 cm (6-7 inches) in total length.

== Conservation status ==
This species is classified as Vulnerable (VU) on the IUCN Red List of Threatened Species with the following criteria: C1+2a(i) (v3.1, 2001). A species is listed as such when the best available evidence indicates that the population size is estimated to number fewer than 10,000 mature individuals, a decline of at least 10% is estimated to continue within 10 years or three generations, whichever is longer, (up to a maximum of 100 years in the future), and a continuing decline has been observed, projected, or inferred, in numbers of mature individuals and no subpopulation is estimated to contain more than 1,000 mature individuals. It is therefore considered to be facing a high risk of extinction in the wild. The population trend is down. Year assessed: 2007. The Alabama Department of Conservation and Natural Resources has listed the species as possibly extirpated within the state.
