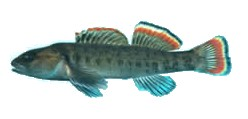

Conservation status
- Vulnerable (IUCN 3.1)

- Endangered (ESA)

Scientific classification
- Kingdom: Animalia
- Phylum: Chordata
- Class: Actinopterygii
- Order: Perciformes
- Family: Percidae
- Genus: Etheostoma
- Species: E. etowahae

Binomial name
- Etheostoma etowahae R. M. Wood & Mayden, 1993

= Etheostoma etowahae =

Species of fish

Etheostoma etowahae, the Etowah darter, is a species of freshwater ray-finned fish, a darter from the subfamily Etheostomatinae, part of the family Percidae, which also contains the perches, ruffes and pikeperches. It is a rare species which is endemic to Georgia in the United States, where it occurs only in the Etowah River and two of its tributaries. It is a federally listed endangered species of the United States.

This fish is brownish or grayish in color with dark blotches on the sides. During the breeding season, the male develops a blue-green color on its breast.

This fish lives in creek and river habitat in areas where the riverbed is rocky with gravel, cobbles, or boulders. It can be found in clear riffles with little silt. It lives only in the Etowah River, and the tributaries Long Swamp and Amicalola Creek.

This species is endangered by the destruction and alteration of its habitat. It is fragmented, and the remnants are changed in ways that are detrimental to the fish. Its habitats are impounded, and the fish does not tolerate impounded areas such as pools. The water is polluted with silt, surface runoff, and other substances.
