= Shingle Creek (Mississippi River tributary) =

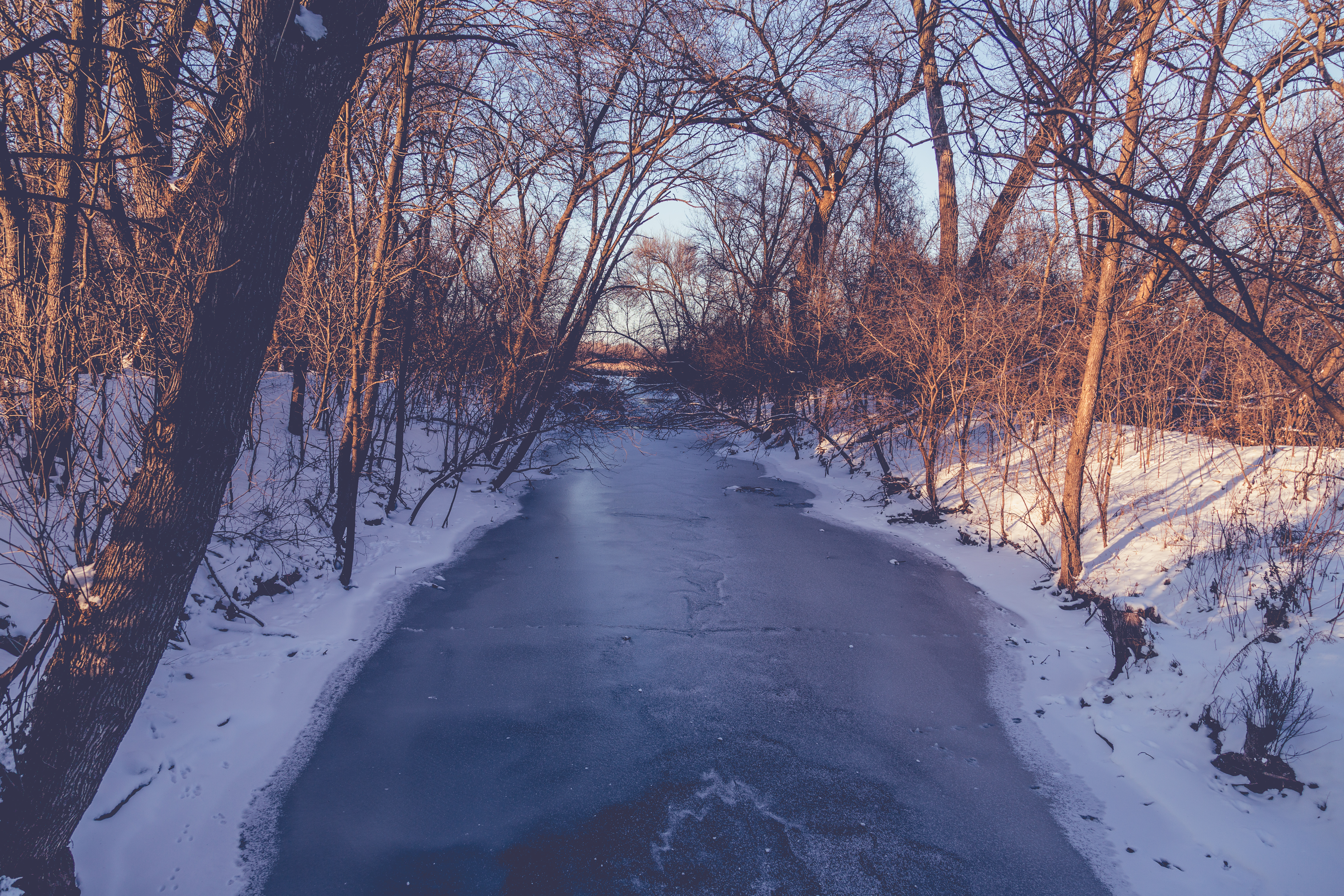
- As seen in the winter
- Native name: Ómnina Waḳaƞ Wakpadaƞ (Dakota)

Physical characteristics
- Source
  - coordinates: 45.079409°N 93.3924524°W
- Mouth
  - coordinates: 45.03274°N 93.28495°W
- Length: 11 miles (18 km)
- Basin size: 44.5 miles (71.6 km)
- Discharge
  - location: Mississippi River

Basin features
- River system: Minnesota River

Shingle Creek (Dakota: Ómnina Waḳaƞ Wakpadaƞ) is a stream in Hennepin County, Minnesota, in the United States. It is a tributary of the Mississippi River. The stream is formed when two tributary creeks, Eagle Creek and Bass Creek, meet.

== History ==
Shingle Creek is known to have been inhabited during the woodland period. In 1898, T.H. Lewis surveyed multiple non-burial mounds near the creek. The Dakota knew the creek as Ómnina Waḳaƞ Wakpadaƞ, which can be translated as "Spirit Refuge Creek". The first European name for the creek was Bohannon Creek, after settler John C. Bohannon. The neighbourhood Shingle Creek is named after the creek.

In 1998, Shingle Creek was declared polluted by the Minnesota Pollution Control Agency due to high levels of chloride from road salt. It was the first water body to be declared as such. In 2005, a restoration effort began, largely focusing on the planting of native plants, and the building of rock vanes. As of 2018, it is still considered polluted from chloride.

== Management ==
It is managed by the Shingle Creek and West Mississippi Management Committee. Ten cities are members of the committee; Brooklyn Center, Brooklyn Park, Crystal, Maple Grove, Minneapolis, New Hope, Minnesota, Osseo, Plymouth and Robbinsdale. The committee was established in 1985.

== See also ==
- List of rivers of Minnesota
- Nine Mile Creek (Minnesota River tributary)
- Coon Creek (Mississippi River tributary)
- Bassett Creek
- Minnehaha Creek
