= Shingle Creek (British Columbia) =

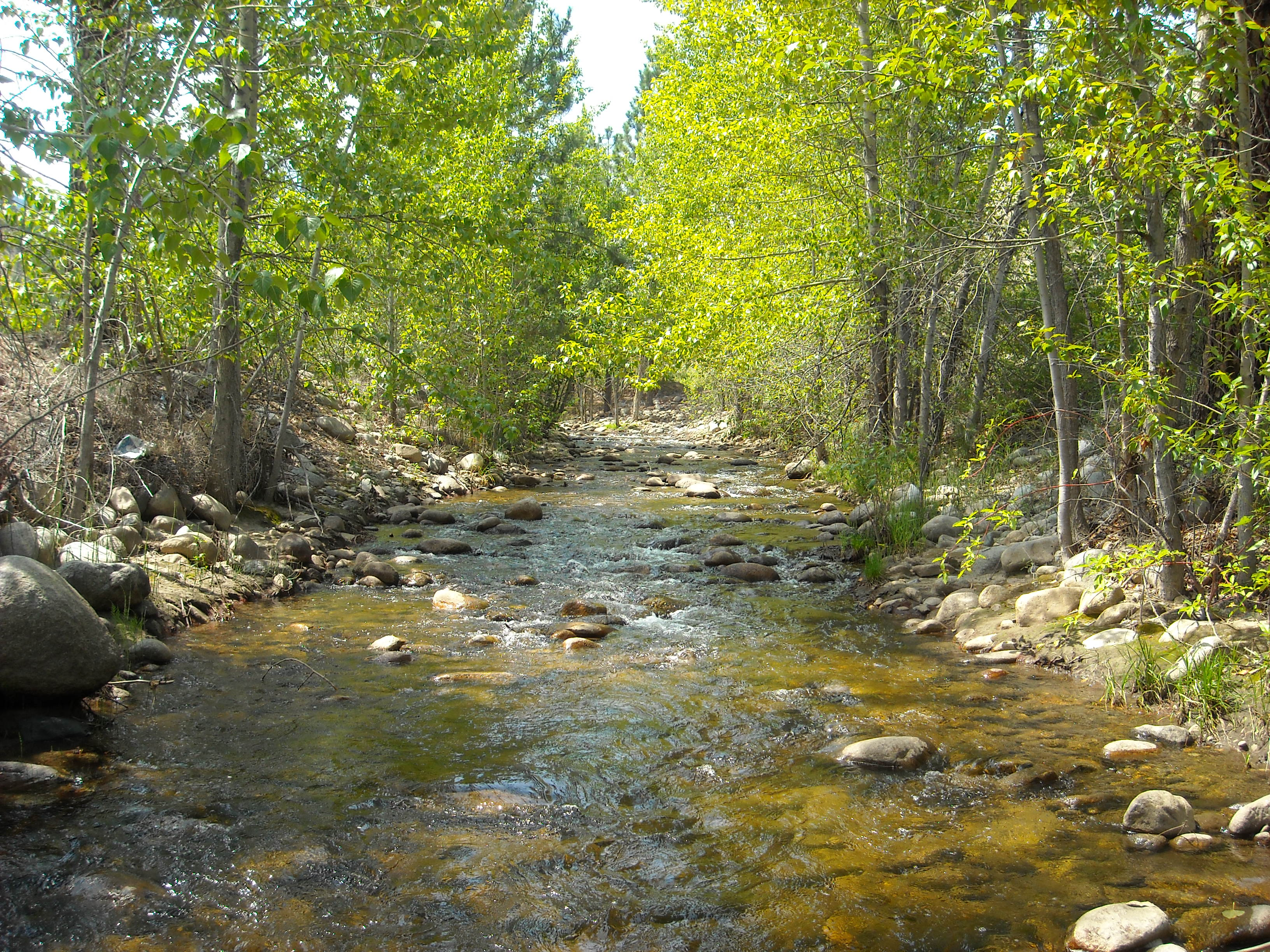

Location
- Country: Canada
- Province: British Columbia

Physical characteristics
- Source: Mount Brent
  - location: East of Penticton
- Mouth: Okanagan River
  - location: Penticton
  - coordinates: 49°28′45″N 119°35′53″W
  - elevation: 1,112 ft (339 m)

Shingle Creek is a tributary of the Okanagan River, joining the Okanagan within the City of Penticton, British Columbia, Canada, after rising on the eastern slopes of Mount Brent in the southern Thompson Plateau to the west of the city, approaching it via the south flank of Mount Nkwala, which overlooks the city. It has been variously mapped as the Beaver River, Beaver Creek, and Riviere aux serpents. The unincorporated community of Shingle Creek, to the west of Mount Nkwala, is named for this stream.

== See also ==
- List of rivers of British Columbia
