= Dead Coon Lake =

Lake in Minnesota, United States

- Location within Minnesota
- Location: Lincoln County, Minnesota
- Coordinates: 44°21′43″N 96°5′48″W
- Type: lake

Dead Coon Lake is a lake in Lincoln County, in the U.S. state of Minnesota.

Dead Coon Lake was named for the dead raccoon seen at this lake by early surveyors.
