= Shingle Creek, Minneapolis =

Coordinates: 45.0478°N 93.3070°W

Shingle Creek
- Neighborhood
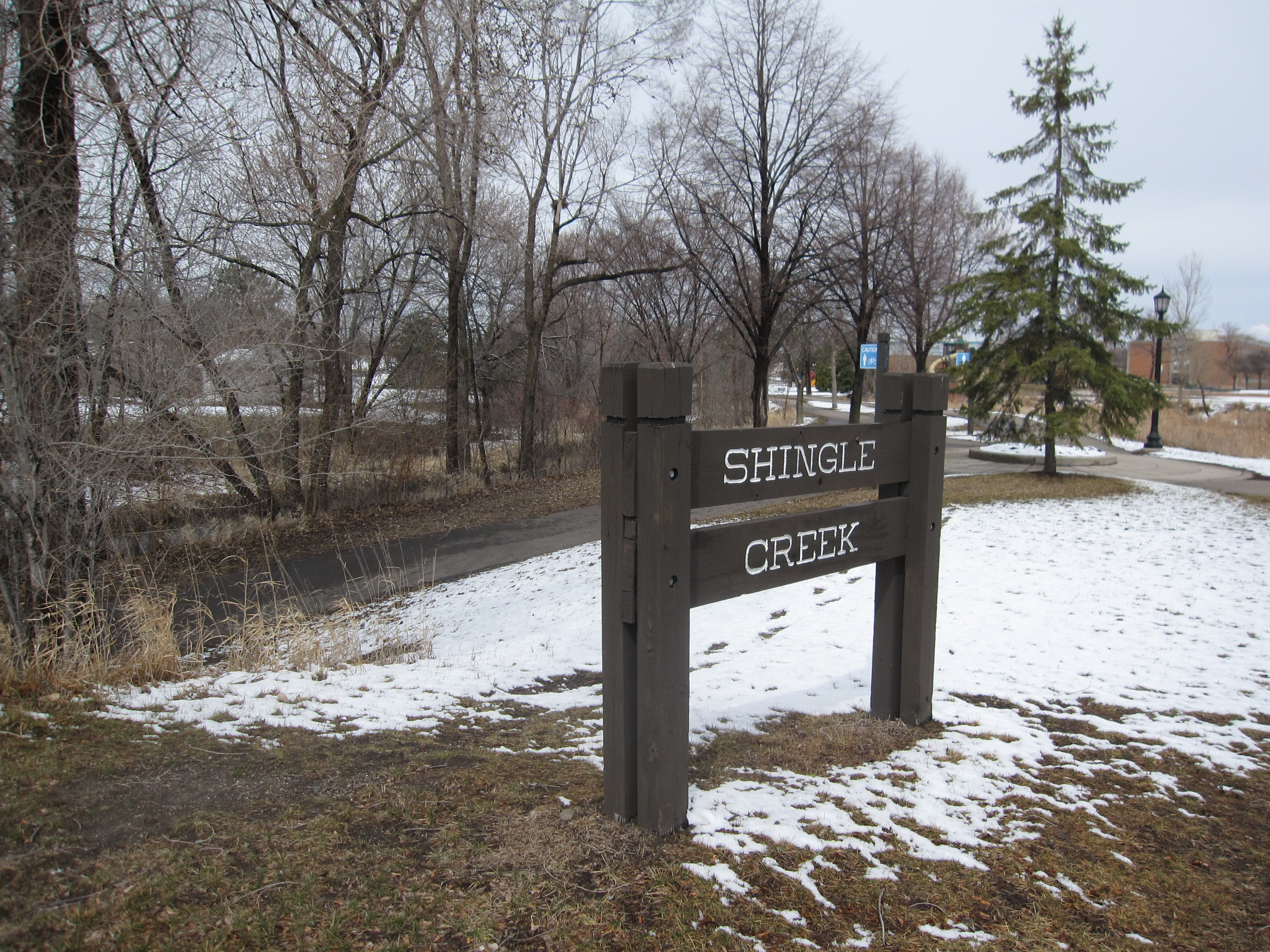
- Sign for Shingle Creek

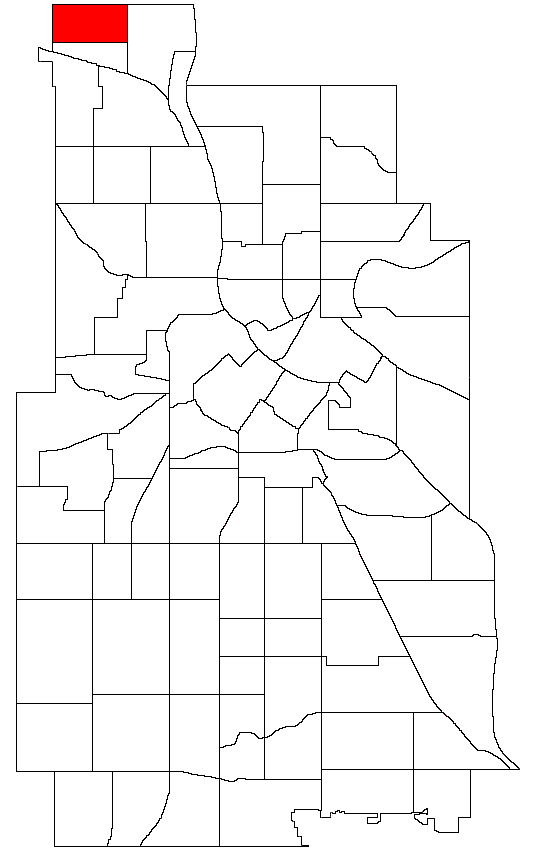
- Location of Shingle Creek within the U.S. city of Minneapolis
- Interactive map of Shingle Creek
- Country: United States
- State: Minnesota
- County: Hennepin
- City: Minneapolis
- Community: Camden
- City Council Ward: 4

Government
  - Council Member: LaTrisha Vetaw

Area
  - Total: 0.496 sq mi (1.28 km^{2})

Population (2020)
  - Total: 3,351
  - Density: 6,760/sq mi (2,610/km^{2})
- Time zone: UTC-6 (CST)
  - Summer (DST): UTC-5 (CDT)
- ZIP code: 55430
- Area code: 612

Historical population
Census	Pop.	Note	%±
1980	3,256		—
1990	3,000		−7.9%
2000	3,170		5.7%
2010	3,031		−4.4%
2020	3,351		10.6%

Shingle Creek is a neighborhood within the Camden community in the U.S. city of Minneapolis. Located in the far northwestern corner of the city, the neighborhood is named after Shingle Creek, the Mississippi River tributary that runs through it.

The boundaries of Shingle Creek are 53rd Avenue North to the north, Humboldt Avenue North to the east, 49th Avenue North to the south, and Xerxes Avenue North to the west. It is located in Ward 4, represented by council member LaTrisha Vetaw.

== Demographics ==
Race/ethnicity
Race/ethnicity	2000		2010		2020	
Race/ethnicity	Number	%	Number	%	Number	%
White alone	1,728	54.51	1,268	41.83	1,097	32.74
Black alone	579	18.26	746	24.61	970	28.95
Hispanic or Latino (any race)	134	4.23	300	9.90	363	10.83
Native American alone	50	1.58	40	1.32	29	0.87
Asian alone	538	16.97	515	16.99	635	18.95
Other race alone	14	0.44	11	0.36	19	0.57
Pacific Islander alone	1	0.03	0	0.00	3	0.09
Two or more races	126	3.88	151	4.98	235	7.01
Total	3,170	100.0	3,031	100.0	3,351	100.0
