= Raccoon Creek (Missouri) =

Stream in the U.S. state of Missouri

Raccoon Creek (also called Coon Creek) is a stream in Daviess and Grundy counties in the U.S. state of Missouri. It is a tributary of Sugar Creek. The confluence is 1.5 miles southeast of the community of Brimson and 1.5 mile west of Sugar Creeks confluence with the Thompson River.

The stream headwaters arise in eastern Daviess County at 40°02′59″N 93°48′26″W and an elevation of 295 m (968 ft). The stream flows to the northeast and enters Grundy County flowing past the Leisure Lake community and passing under Missouri Route 146 to enter Sugar Creek at 40°07′43″N 93°42′11″W an elevation of 228 m (748 ft).

Raccoon Creek most likely was named for the raccoons in the immediate area.

== See also ==
- List of rivers of Missouri
