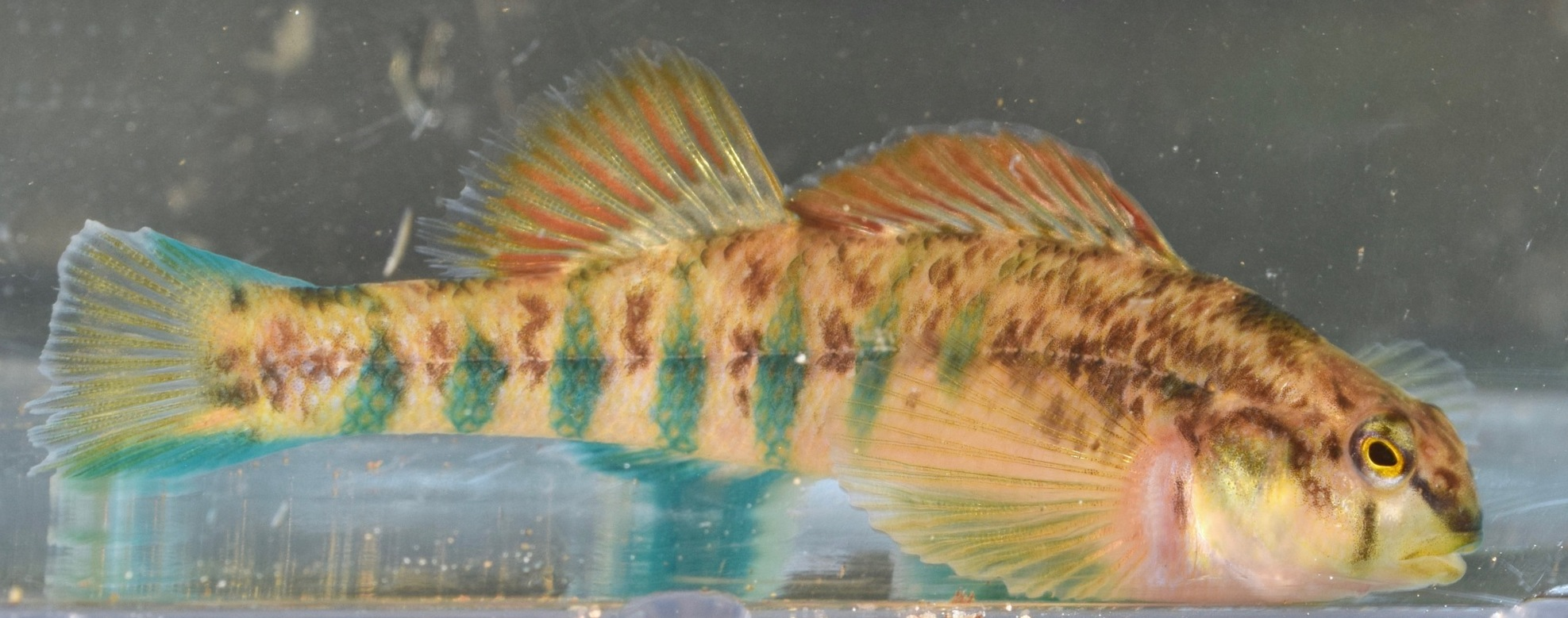
- Georgia, US

Conservation status
- Endangered (IUCN 3.1)

- Threatened (ESA)

Scientific classification
- Kingdom: Animalia
- Phylum: Chordata
- Class: Actinopterygii
- Division: Teleostei
- Order: Perciformes
- Family: Percidae
- Genus: Etheostoma
- Species: E. scotti

Binomial name
- Etheostoma scotti B. H. Bauer, Etnier & Burkhead, 1995

= Cherokee darter =

Species of fish

The Cherokee darter (Etheostoma scotti) is a rare species of freshwater ray-finned fish, a darter from the subfamily Etheostomatinae, part of the family Percidae, which also contains the perches, ruffes and pikeperches. It is endemic to Georgia in the United States, where it is limited to the Etowah River system. It inhabits creeks with rocky bottoms and little silt, typically occurring just above and below riffles. It is a whitish or yellowish fish with green and black spots on the flanks and eight dark saddle-like bars dorsally. It has a small range and its habitat is being degraded and fragmented, and the International Union for Conservation of Nature has assessed its conservation status as being endangered.

== Description ==
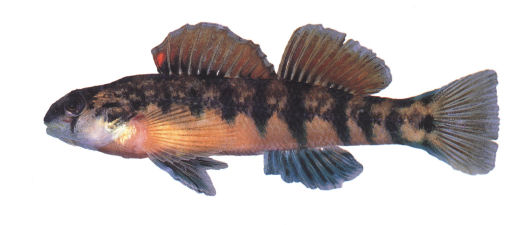
Cherokee darter

The fish is whitish to yellowish with olive green and black spots on the sides which become larger during the breeding season. Eight dark saddle-like markings are on the back. The male is a maximum of about 5 cm in length.

Spawning occurs from March through June, with the females depositing the eggs in gravel or sometimes bedrock or wood debris. The fish becomes sexually mature at one year and it does not appear to live more than two years.

== Distribution ==
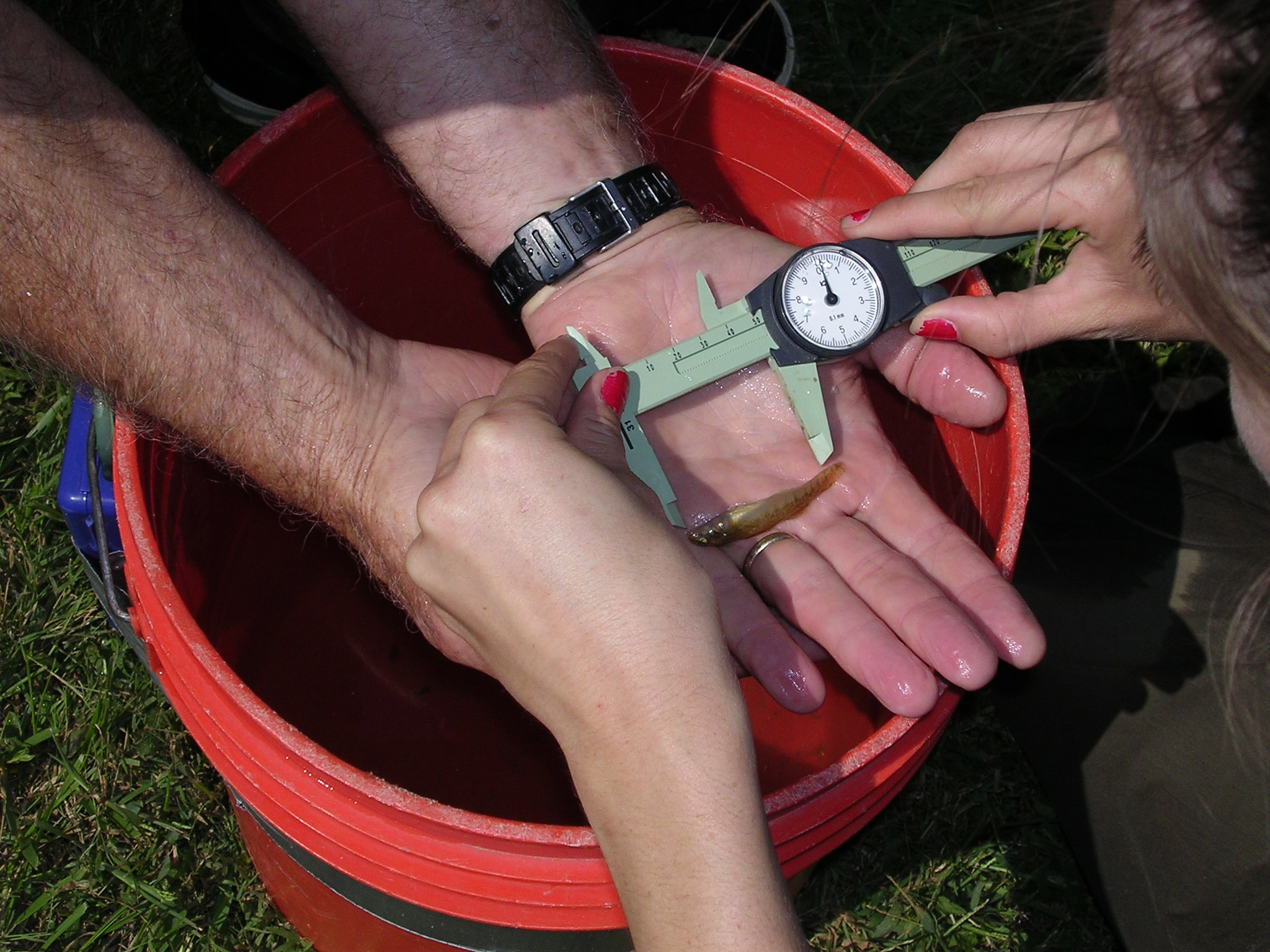
E. scotti being measured

The Cherokee darter is endemic to Georgia in the United States, where it is limited to the Etowah River system. It lives in creeks with rocky bottoms, staying mostly in clear parts of the stream with little silt. The fish can be found in several tributaries of the Etowah River, but few of the populations are large or very healthy. The larger populations can be found in the northern tributaries above Lake Allatoona. This reservoir is in the center of the fish's distribution, dividing it in two and causing fragmentation of the population.

== Status ==
This fish was not formally described as a new species until 1995, but it was federally listed as a threatened species of the United States in 1994. The population of this fish is declining due to loss of suitable habitat because of stream impoundment, siltation and pollution. The International Union for Conservation of Nature has assessed its conservation status as being endangered.
