= Coon Creek (West Fork Cuivre River tributary) =

Stream in the U.S. state of Missouri

Coon Creek is a stream in Audrain and Montgomery counties in the U.S. state of Missouri. It is a tributary of the West Fork Cuivre River.

The stream headwaters arise in southeastern Audrain County just north of Martinsburg at 39°06′25″N 91°38′37″W at an elevation of approximately 805 feet. The stream flows generally eastward into northwest Montgomery County crossing under Missouri Route 161 along the south edge of Middletown and enters the West Fork Cuivre River approximately two miles east of Middletown at 39°07′11″N 91°22′41″W and an elevation of 630 feet.

Coon Creek was so named on account of raccoons in the area.

== See also ==
- List of rivers of Missouri
