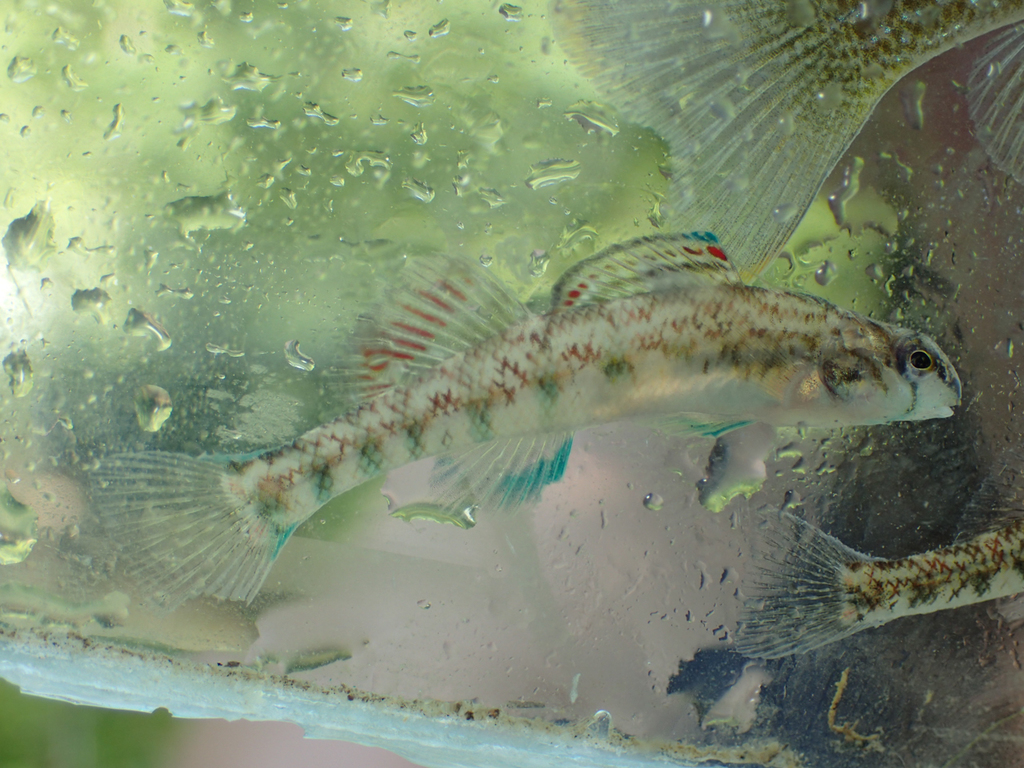

Conservation status
- Least Concern (IUCN 3.1)

Scientific classification
- Kingdom: Animalia
- Phylum: Chordata
- Class: Actinopterygii
- Order: Perciformes
- Family: Percidae
- Genus: Etheostoma
- Species: E. coosae

Binomial name
- Etheostoma coosae (Fowler, 1945)

Synonyms
- Poecilichthys coosae Fowler, 1945

= Coosa darter =

Species of fish

The Coosa darter (Etheostoma coosae) is a species of freshwater ray-finned fish, a darter from the subfamily Etheostomatinae, part of the family Percidae, which also contains the perches, ruffes and pikeperches. It is endemic to the eastern United States.

== Description ==
The Coosa darter is a robust species of darter which can be identified by having a blunt snout with a small mouth. The spiny part of its dorsal fin is marked with bands of color and has a central red band along the whole of its length, although it does not possess the anterior ocellus found in many other species in the subgenus Ulocentra. Above and below this central band there are alternating clear and dark bands. In the soft-rayed part of the dorsal fin, the middle part of the membranes between each ray is red. The color of the body is yellow-olive, marked with 8–9 dark blotches located dorsally and on the flanks. The lower snout and the throat are pale green, while the anal fin and upper and lower lobes of the caudal fin are turquoise. The blotches along the flank have a slightly green hue. The maximum recorded total length for this species is 7.2 centimetres (2.8 in), although the standard length of males is more commonly around 4.1 centimetres (1.6 in) and of females 3.9 centimetres (1.5 in).

== Distribution ==
The Coosa darter is only found in the Coosa River system, which drains into Mobile Bay in Georgia, Alabama and Tennessee.

== Habitat and biology ==
The Coosa darter is found in rocky pools and nearby riffles of creeks and small to medium rivers, as well as in streams. It feeds mainly on the larvae of midge and blackfly larvae, with smaller amounts of cladocera, copepods, mayfly nymphs, and caddisfly larvae. Insects, especially flies, are more important in summer and crustaceans become more important in the winter. The Coosa darter is known to spawn from mid-March to mid-May. The female lays a single egg at a time, placing it in small cracks and crevices in wood, rocks, or other hard substrates. The male fertilizes the eggs as soon as they are laid. They may spawn in any position from horizontal to vertical.

== Taxonomy ==
The Coosa darter was first formally described as Poecilichthys coosae in 1945 by the American ichthyologist Henry Weed Fowler (1878–1965) with the type locality given as a small creek in the Coosa River drainage within Cherokee County, Alabama, near the settlement of Chesterfield.

== Status ==
The IUCN has listed this species as being of "Least Concern" because it has an extensive range in the Coosa River system, has a large total population size, and has numerous subpopulations. In general, the population trend seems stable and no major threats have been identified.
