= Coon Creek (Perche Creek tributary) =

Stream in Missouri, U.S.

Coordinates: 39.1600383°N 92.4254580°W

Coon Creek is a stream in the U.S. state of Missouri. It is a tributary of Perche Creek.

Coon Creek was named for the raccoons encountered by pioneers in the area.

== See also ==
- List of rivers of Missouri
