= Raccoon Creek (Etowah River tributary) =

Coordinates: 34°7′44.35″N 84°53′28.79″W

Raccoon Creek is a 21-mile-long(35 km) waterway which traverses through two counties in Georgia, U.S., beginning in Paulding County and joining the Etowah River in Bartow County. The waterway begins near the town of Yorkville, Georgia and ends near the town Stilesboro, Georgia.
