= Coon Creek (Lake Taneycomo tributary) =

Stream in Missouri, U.S.

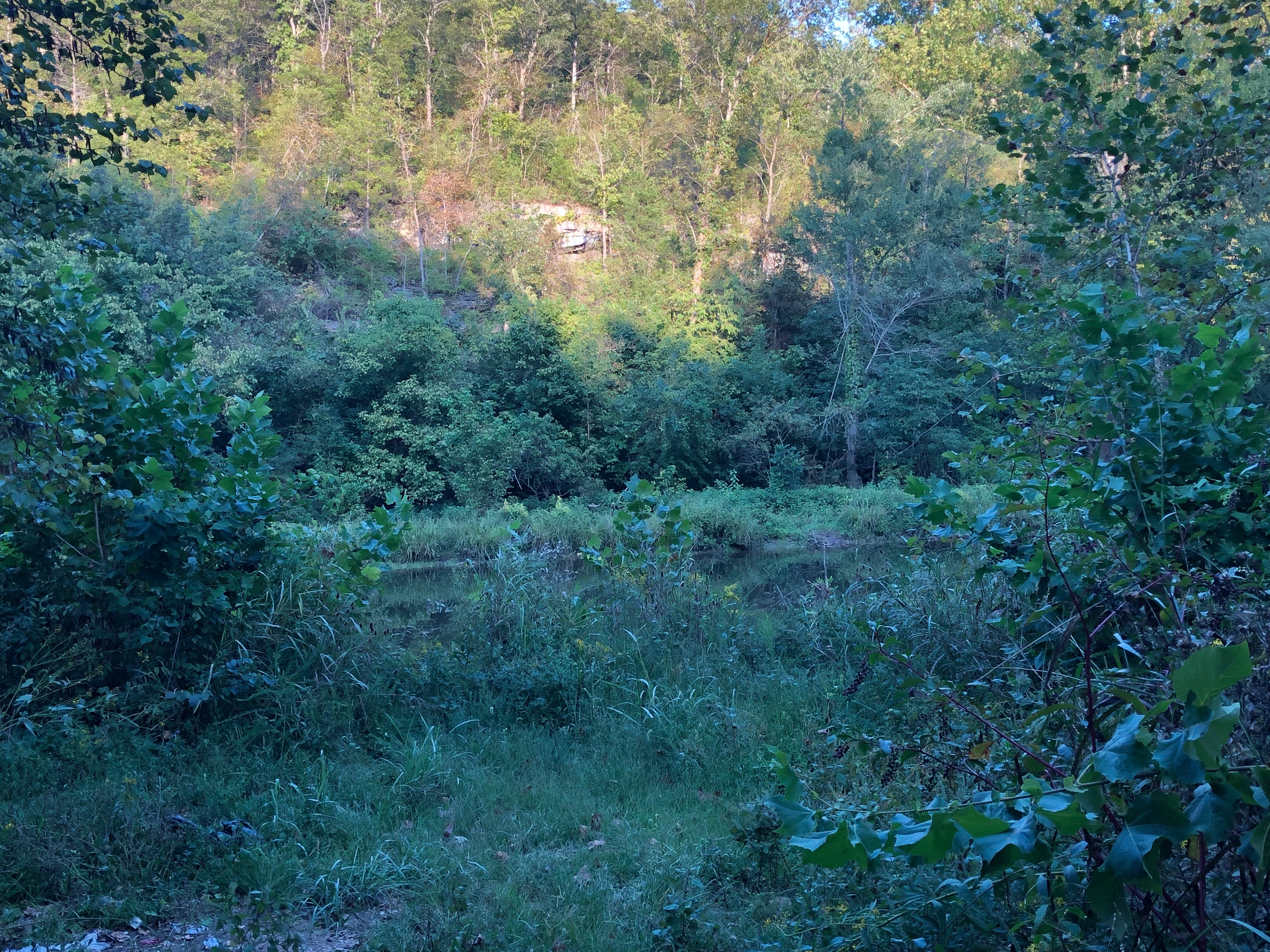
- Coon Creek near mouth to Lake Taneycomo
- Etymology: Named for raccoons in the area

Location
- Country: United States
- State: Missouri
- County: Taney County

Physical characteristics
- Mouth: Lake Taneycomo
  - coordinates: 36.6397843°N 93.2110143°W

Coon Creek is a stream in Taney County in the U.S. state of Missouri. It is a tributary of Lake Taneycomo.

Coon Creek was so named on account of raccoons in the area.

== See also ==
- List of rivers of Missouri
