= Coon Creek (Pettis County, Missouri) =

Stream in the US state of Missouri

Coon Creek is a stream in Pettis County, Missouri, United States. It is a tributary to Muddy Creek. The stream headwaters arise at 38°40′32″N 93°20′36″W and it flows generally to the northeast for approximately four miles to its confluence with Muddy Creek at 38°43′30.06″N 93°18′30.75″W adjacent to the southwest side of US Route 50 and approximately three miles northwest of Sedalia.

Coon Creek was so named due to the presence of raccoons in the area.

== See also ==
- List of rivers of Missouri
