= Shingle Creek, British Columbia =

Unincorporated community in British Columbia, Canada

Coordinates: 49°31′N 119°48′W

Shingle Creek is an unincorporated community in the southeastern Thompson Plateau of the Southern Interior of British Columbia, named after the stream of the same name, a tributary of the Okanagan River which joins that stream in the city of Penticton.
