= Coon Creek (Osage River tributary) =

Stream in the U.S. state of Missouri

Coordinates: 38°15′56″N 92°25′03″W

Coon Creek is a stream in Miller County in the U.S. state of Missouri. It is a tributary of the Osage River.

The stream headwaters arise along the south side of Missouri Route A about one mile east of that roads intersection with Missouri Route 17. The stream flows northeast passing under Route A then turns north-northwest to pass under Missouri Route 52 and enters the Osage about three miles northeast (downstream) of Tuscumbia.

The headwaters are at: and an elevation of about 820 ft (250 m). The confluence with the Osage is at: at an elevation of 558 ft (170 m).

Coon Creek was so named due to the presence of raccoons near its course.

== See also ==
- List of rivers of Missouri
