= Coon Creek (Deane Creek tributary) =

Stream in the U.S. state of Missouri

Coon Creek is a stream in northwest Pulaski County and northeast Camden County in the U.S. state of Missouri. It is a tributary of Deane Creek.

The stream headwaters arise just south of the community of Hawkeye in the northwest corner of Pulaski County (at 38°00′09″N 92°23′37″W). The stream flows generally west to southwest into Camden County to enter Deane Creek at 38°00′03″N 92°27′51″W.

Coon Creek was named for the raccoons observed along its course.

== See also ==
- List of rivers of Missouri
