= Coon Creek (Redwood River tributary) =

Stream in Minnesota, U.S.

Coordinates: 44°19′01″N 95°57′28″W

Coon Creek is a stream in the U.S. state of Minnesota. It is a tributary of the Redwood River.

Coon Creek was named from the fact it heads at Dead Coon Lake.

== See also ==
- List of rivers of Minnesota
