= Coon Creek (Blue Earth River tributary) =

Stream in Minnesota and Iowa, U.S.

Coordinates: 43°36′48″N 94°06′12″W

Coon Creek is a stream in Faribault County, Minnesota, and Kossuth County, Iowa. It is a tributary of the Blue Earth River.

Coon Creek was named for the raccoons once hunted in the area for their fur.

== See also ==
- List of rivers of Iowa
- List of rivers of Minnesota
