= Coosa River =

River in Alabama and Georgia, US

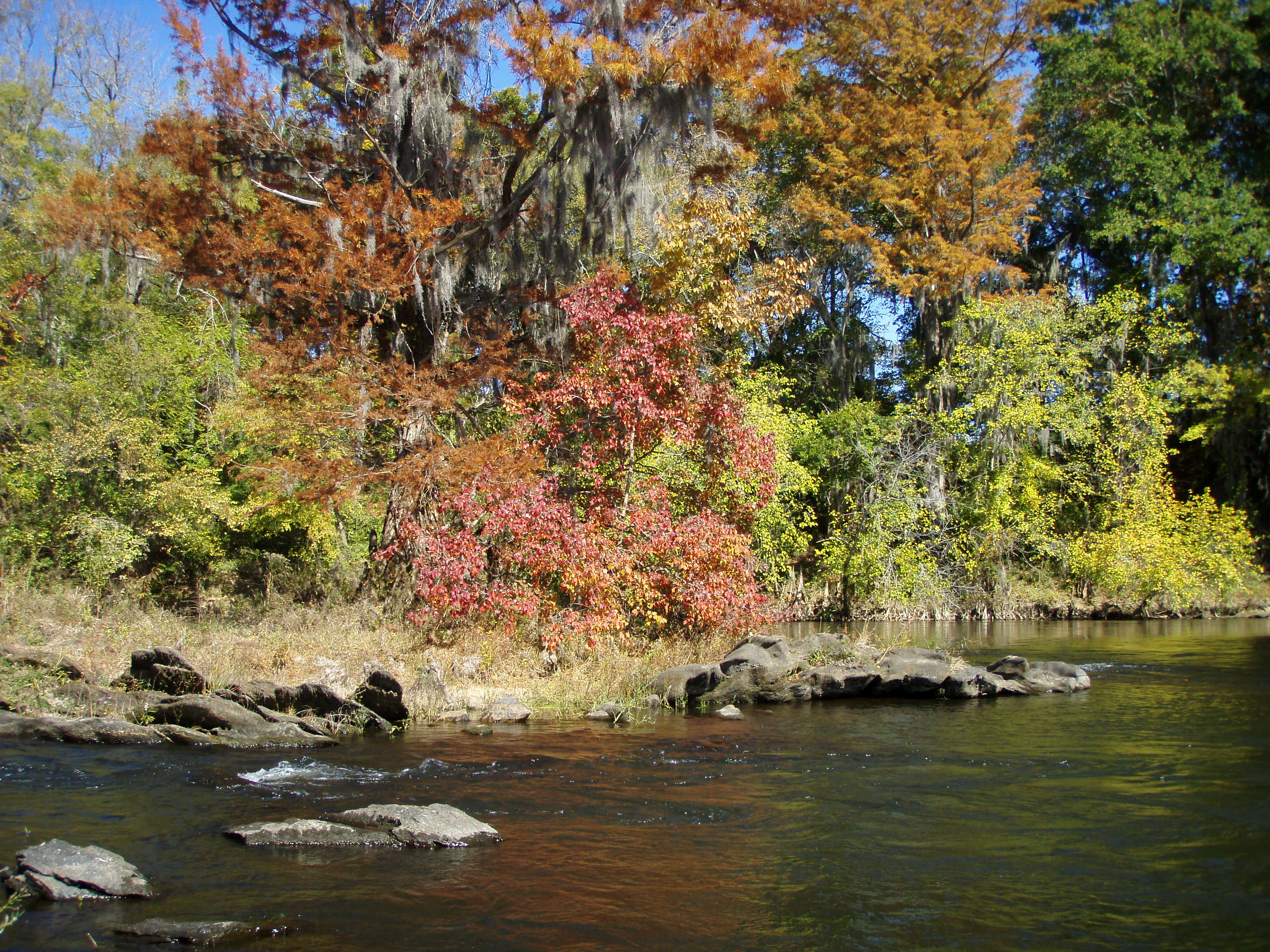
- Fall colors on the Coosa River near Wetumpka, Alabama

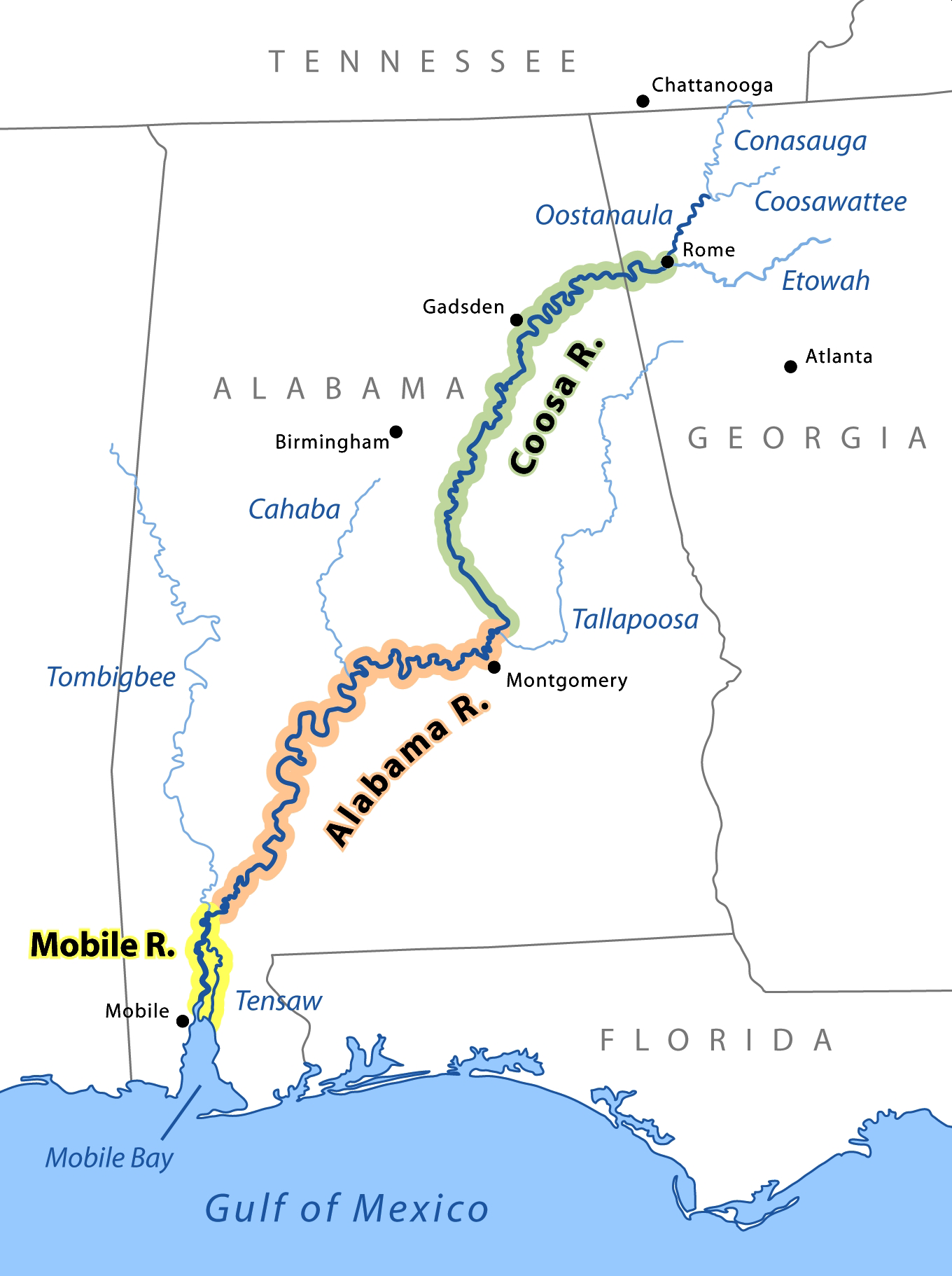
- The Coosa River is the major tributary when it joins the Tallapoosa River near Wetumpka, Alabama to form the Alabama River.

Location
- Country: United States
- State: Georgia, Alabama
- Counties: GA: Floyd; AL: Cherokee, Etowah, St. Clair, Calhoun, Talladega, Shelby, Coosa, Chilton, Elmore
- Major cities: Rome, GA; Gadsden, AL; Wetumpka, AL

Physical characteristics
- Source: Etowah River
  - location: Suches, GA
  - coordinates: 34°39′43″N 84°07′41″W
  - elevation: 2,677 ft (816 m)
- 2nd source: Oostanaula River
  - location: Dunn, GA
  - coordinates: 34°53′06″N 84°34′23″W
  - elevation: ~ 730 feet (220 m)
- Mouth: Alabama River
  - location: Coosada, AL
  - coordinates: 32°29′10″N 86°16′40″W
  - elevation: 121 ft (37 m)
- Length: 280 mi (450 km)
- Basin size: 10,100 sq mi (26,000 km^{2})
- Discharge
  - location: USGS gage 02411000, Coosa River at Jordan Dam near Wetumpka, AL
  - average: 15,950 cu ft/s (452 m^{3}/s)
  - minimum: 54 cu ft/s (1.5 m^{3}/s)
  - maximum: 256,000 cu ft/s (7,200 m^{3}/s)

The Coosa River is a tributary of the Alabama River in the U.S. states of Alabama and Georgia. The river is about 280 miles (450 km) long.

The Coosa River begins at the confluence of the Oostanaula and Etowah rivers in Rome, Georgia, and ends just northeast of the Alabama state capital, Montgomery, where it joins the Tallapoosa River to form the Alabama River just south of Wetumpka. Around 90% of the Coosa River's length is located in Alabama. Coosa County, Alabama and Etowah County, Alabama are located on the Coosa River.

The Coosa is one of Alabama's most developed rivers. Most of the river has been impounded, with Alabama Power, a unit of the Southern Company, owning seven dams and powerhouses on the Coosa River. The dams produce hydroelectric power, but they have adversely affected several species endemic to the Coosa River.

== History ==
Native Americans had been living on the Coosa Valley for millennia before Hernando de Soto and his men became the first Europeans to visit it in 1540. The Coosa chiefdom was one of the most powerful chiefdoms in the southeast at the time.

Over a century after the Spanish left the Coosa Valley, the British established strong trading ties with the Muscogee Creek bands of the area around the late 17th century, much to the dismay of France, which had some early settlements on the coast, specifically Mobile. The French had traveled from there upriver and believed that the Coosa River was a key gateway to the entire South; they wanted to control the valley. The main transportation of the day was by boat. The confluence of the Coosa and Tallapoosa rivers formed the Alabama River, which has its mouth at Mobile Bay, the port used by the French for travel around the Caribbean and to France. They wanted to retain control of both the Coosa and the Alabama rivers.

In the early 18th century, almost all European and Indian trade in the southeast ceased during the tribal uprisings brought on by the Yamasee War against the Carolinas. After a few years, the Indian trade system was resumed under somewhat reformed policies. The conflict between the French and English over the Coosa Valley, and much of the southeast in general, continued. It was not until after Britain had defeated France in the Seven Years' War (also known as the French and Indian War) that France relinquished its holdings east of the Mississippi River to Britain. This was part of the Treaty of Paris, signed by both nations in 1763 to mark the end of the war.

By the end of the American Revolutionary War, the Coosa Valley was occupied in its lower portion by the Creek and in the upper portion by the Cherokee peoples, who had a settlement near its origin in northwest Georgia. They were beginning to feel pressure from European-American encroachment throughout their territories.

After the Fort Mims massacre near Mobile, General Andrew Jackson led American troops, along with Cherokee allies, against the Lower Creek in the Creek War. This culminated in the Creek defeat at the Battle of Horseshoe Bend. Afterward, the Treaty of Fort Jackson in 1814 forced the Creek to cede a large amount of land to the United States, but left them a reserve between the Coosa and Tallapoosa rivers in northern Alabama. Even there the Creeks were encroached on by European-American settlers who began as squatters from the United States.

Finally, during the 1820s and 1830s the Creek, Cherokee, and virtually all the southeastern Indians were removed to Indian Territory (present-day Oklahoma). The Cherokee removal is remembered as the Trail of Tears. The Cherokee capital city of New Echota was located on the headwater tributaries of the Coosa River, in Georgia, until the tribe's removal. The Creek and Choctaw removals were similar to the Cherokee Trail of Tears. After the removals, the Coosa River valley and the southeast in general was wide open for American settlers.

The invention of the cotton gin at the turn of the 19th century had made short-staple cotton profitable to process. It could be easily grown in the upland areas of the South, and demand was high for this cotton in the US and Europe. Large-scale migrations known as "Alabama Fever" filled Alabama with new settlers developing large cotton plantations worked by enslaved African Americans.

The first river town to form in the Coosa Basin was at the foot of the last waterfall on the Coosa River, the "Devil's Staircase." Settlers soon adopted the native name Wetumpka (meaning "rumbling waters" or "falling stream") for this new community.

The Coosa River was an important transportation route into the early 20th century as a commercial waterway for riverboats along the upper section of the river for 200 miles south of Rome. However, shoals and waterfalls, such the Devil's Staircase along the river's lowest 65 miles, blocked the upper Coosa's riverboats from access to the Alabama River and the Gulf of Mexico.

Through its building of dams on the Coosa in the early 20th century — Lay, Mitchell and Jordan — Alabama Power began to pioneer new methods of controlling and eliminating malaria, which was a major health issue in rural Alabama in the early 1900s and in other river valley areas. So successful were their pioneering efforts, that the Medical Division of the League of Nations visited Alabama to study the new methods during the construction of Mitchell Dam.

== Impoundments and sections ==
The following table describes the seven impoundments on the Coosa River from the south to north built by the Alabama Power Company as well as the tailwater section below Jordan Dam. Harvey H. Jackson III in a book Putting Loafing Streams To Work characterized the importance of the first Coosa River dams as follows:

Prior to 1912 only seventy-two Alabama communities had electricity, but by 1928, when Jordan Dam went into operation, Alabama Power served four hundred twenty-one communities in sixty-one of Alabama's sixty-seven counties. The company also provided power for coal and iron mines, cotton mills, cement plants, quarries, steel plants and rolling mills, foundries, pipe plants and machine shops, ice plants, public utilities, and electric furnance installations, industries that put thousands of [Alabama] citizens to work.

Impoundment/Section	Description	Images
Jordan Dam Tailwater	The Jordan Dam Tailwater flows approximate 7.5 miles into Wetumpka, Alabama, and it is a combination of pools, shoals and rapids. Alabama Power maintains minimum flow releases from Jordan Dam for whitewater boating and aquatic enhancement of the Coosa and Alabama Rivers below the dam. This section of river is home to the Moccasin Gap rapids, a class III whitewater.	Pipeline Falls section of Coosa River, near Wetumpka, Alabama
Lake Jordan	Lake Jordan was impounded on December 31, 1928, and it was named after the maiden name (Jordan) of the mother of Reuben and Sidney Mitchell, who were instrumental in the construction of the Mitchell Dam on the Coosa River. The dam is 125 ft high, and it impounds 6800 acres (28 km^{2}) of water. Lake Jordan has a surface elevation of 252' MSL and 180 miles of shoreline. The nearest town is Wetumpka, Alabama. It is an Alabama Power lake with a 100,000 Kilowatt generating capacity. Lake Jordan is also a recreational lake with fishing opportunities for largemouth bass, spotted bass, bluegill and other sunfish, crappie, catfish, striped bass, hybrid bass, and white bass. It was the location of the 2004 Bass Masters Classic Tournament. The lake has two public access sites maintained by Alabama Power.	Sunset Over Lake Jordan Near Weoka Creek, 1996.
Lake Bouldin	This was impounded on July 27, 1967, and it was named for Walter Bouldin. Lake Bouldin is part of Lake Jordan, and it is connected to Lake Jordan and the Coosa River by two manmade canals. Bouldin added 225,000 kilowatt generating power to the Lake Jordan system On February 10, 1975, an earth embankment section of Walter Bouldin Dam breached, causing total evacuation of the forebay reservoir and rendering the 225-MW power plant inoperable. No casualties or property damage (beyond the dam itself) were reported, and the dam was reconstructed later.	
Lake Mitchell	Lake Mitchell was impounded on August 15, 1923, and it was named for James Mitchell, the President of Alabama Power from 1912 through 1920. The dam impounds 5850 acres (24 km^{2}) of water, and it created a lake with 147 miles of shoreline. The nearest town is Clanton, Alabama. Lake Mitchell is an Alabama Power lake with a 170,000 kilowatt generating capacity. It is also a recreational lake with fishing opportunities for largemouth bass, spotted bass, bluegill and other sunfish, crappie, catfish, walleye, striped bass, hybrid bass, and white bass. Alabama Power maintains three public access sites on the lake.	Typical Spring Time Shoreline On Lake Mitchell, Coosa River, 2006
Lay Lake	Lay Lake was impounded in 1914 and named after Captain William Patrick Lay, the first President of Alabama Power. The dam impounds 12,000 acres (49 km^{2}) of water, with a shoreline of 289 miles. The nearest town is Columbiana, Alabama. Lay Lake is an Alabama Power lake with 177,000 kilowatt generating capacity. It is also a recreational lake with fishing opportunities for largemouth bass, spotted bass, bluegill and other sunfish, crappie, catfish, striped bass, hybrid bass, and white bass. Alabama Power maintains seven public access sites on the lake. Lay Dam was one of the earliest concrete dams in the U.S., and its construction helped pioneer dam building technology in the early 20th century.	Lay Dam From Eastern Shoreline of Coosa River, 1996.
Lake Logan Martin	Lake Logan Martin was impounded on August 10, 1964, and it was named after William Logan Martin, Jr. He was a circuit court judge in Montgomery who also served as the Attorney General for Alabama. The lake covers 15,263 acres (61.8 km^{2}), and it has 275 miles of shoreline. The nearest town is Pell City, Alabama. Lake Logan Martin is an Alabama Power lake with a 128,250 kilowatt generating capacity. It is also a recreational lake with fishing opportunities for largemouth bass, spotted bass, bluegill and other sunfish, crappie, catfish, striped bass, hybrid bass, and white bass. Alabama Power maintains three public access sites on the lake.	Tailwater Fishery below Logan Martin Dam on the Coosa River, 1996.
Lake Neely Henry	Lake Neely Henry was impounded on June 2, 1966, and it was named for H. Neely Henry, a senior executive vice-president of the Alabama Power Company. The dam impounds 11,200 acres (45.3 km^{2}) of water, and it has 339 miles of shoreline. The nearest town is Ohatchee, Alabama. Lake Neely Henry is an Alabama Power lake with a 72,900 kilowatt generating capacity. It is also a recreational lake with fishing opportunities for largemouth bass, spotted bass, bluegill and other sunfish, crappie, catfish, striped bass, hybrid bass, and white bass. Alabama Power maintains three public access sites on the lake.	Neely Henry Dam and Powerhouse, Coosa River near Anniston, Alabama, 1996.
Weiss Lake	The Weiss lake was impounded on June 5, 1961, and it was named for F.C. Weiss, a former chief engineer of Alabama Power. The dam impounds a 30,200 acres (122 km^{2}) lake with 447 miles of shoreline. The nearest town is Leesburg, Alabama. Weiss Lake is an Alabama Power lake with an 87,750 kilowatt generating capacity. It is also a recreational lake with fishing opportunities for largemouth bass, spotted bass, bluegill and other sunfish, crappie, catfish, striped bass, hybrid bass, and white bass. Weiss Lake is known for its crappie fishing and often called the "Crappie Capital of the World". Alabama Power maintains five public access sites on the lake.	Weiss Dam and Power Plant on Coosa River, 1996.

== Flora and fauna biodiversity highlights ==
In the Middle Coosa River Watershed, 281 occurrences of rare plant and animal species and natural communities have been documented, including 73 occurrences of 23 species that are federal or state protected. Ten conservation targets were chosen: the riverine system, matrix forest communities (oak hickory-pine forest), gray bat (Myotis grisescens), riparian vegetation, mountain longleaf pine (Pinus palustris) forest communities, red-cockaded woodpecker (Picoides borealis), critically imperiled aquatic species (fish, mussels, and snails), southern hognose snake (Heterodon simus), caddisflies, and imperiled plants. Maintaining the biodiversity of the Coosa River system is particularly important because it has already lost a significant portion of its aquatic fauna to extinction.

Category	Summary	Details (S)=State Status (F)=Federal Status
Aquatic gastropods (snails)	shell and operculum of extinct Clappia umbilicata 82 species. According to research, 26 of the historically known 82 species of aquatic gastropods living in the Coosa River Basin, are now considered extinct.: In 2004, Alabama Department of Conservation and Natural Resources researchers discovered two, previously thought to be extinct, snails — The cobble Elimia and the teardrop Elimia — in a stretch of the Coosa River below Lake Neely Henry	Endangered, threatened, and rare species: Threatened gastropods: round rocksnail (SF)
Amphibians	Green salamander 37 species of amphibians exist in the Coosa River Basin. (9 of the 37 species are considered of "Special Concern" by the Georgia Natural Heritage Program)	Endangered, threatened, and rare species: Rare amphibians: green salamander is "rare" in Georgia (S)
Fish	87 species representing 17 families (13 of the fish species have been listed for protection by federal or state agencies as endangered, threatened, or rare.) Lake sturgeon The lake sturgeon (Acipenser fulvescens), a threatened species and once prevalent in the Coosa River system until the 1960s, is being reintroduced by the Georgia Department of Natural Resources. The Alabama sturgeon, a former resident of the Coosa River below the Fall Line, was placed on the endangered species list in September 2000.	Endangered, threatened, rare and invasive species: Endangered fish: blue shiner (S), frecklebelly madtom (S), freckled madtom (S), amber darter (SF), Conasauga logperch (SF), freckled darter (S), Etowah darter (F); Threatened fish: bluestripe shiner (S), holiday (Ellijay) darter (S), coldwater darter (S), Etowah darter (S), Cherokee darter (SF), trispot darter (S), goldline darter (SF), blue shiner (F); Rare fish: bigeye chub (S), river redhorse (S)
Mussels	Freshwater mussels serve as natural filtration systems that help keep the water clean and clear. Georgia has 98 species of mussels laying its claim to the most diverse mussel fauna of the 50 states. Eleven species of these mussels native to the Coosa basin are currently listed or proposed for listing as endangered or threatened. 13 species are now extinct. Alabama had one of the richest and most diverse assemblages of mussels in the world with about 180 species. Approximately two-thirds of North American mussel species have been reported from Alabama.	Endangered, threatened, and rare species
Plants	Green pitcherplant The upper Coosa watershed in northeastern Alabama and north Georgia is home to the majority of the remaining clumps of the endangered green pitcherplant.	Endangered, threatened, and rare species: Endangered plants: green pitcherplant (SF); Threatened plants: Coosa barbara buttons (SF), monkeyface orchid (S), Little River water plantain (S); Rare plants: Fraser loosestrife (S)
Reptiles	The southern hognose snake was a candidate species (C2) for listing as either threatened or endangered by the U.S. Fish and Wildlife Service (USFWS). However, the USFWS discontinued the designation of C2 species as candidates for listing (50 CFR 17; 28 February 1996). The southern hognose snake is considered to be a species of concern, but more biological research and field study are needed to resolve its conservation status.	Endangered, threatened, and rare species: Rare reptiles: southern hognose snake (S)
Birds and mammals	Bald eagle The bald eagle, once an endangered species now has nesting populations on and in the vicinity of Coosa River impoundments The largest concentration of clusters in Alabama of the red-cockaded woodpecker, an endangered species, occurs on lands adjacent to Lake Mitchell under the stewardship of Alabama Power.	Endangered, threatened, and rare species: Endangered species: red-cockaded woodpecker (F), gray bat (F)

== Tributaries ==
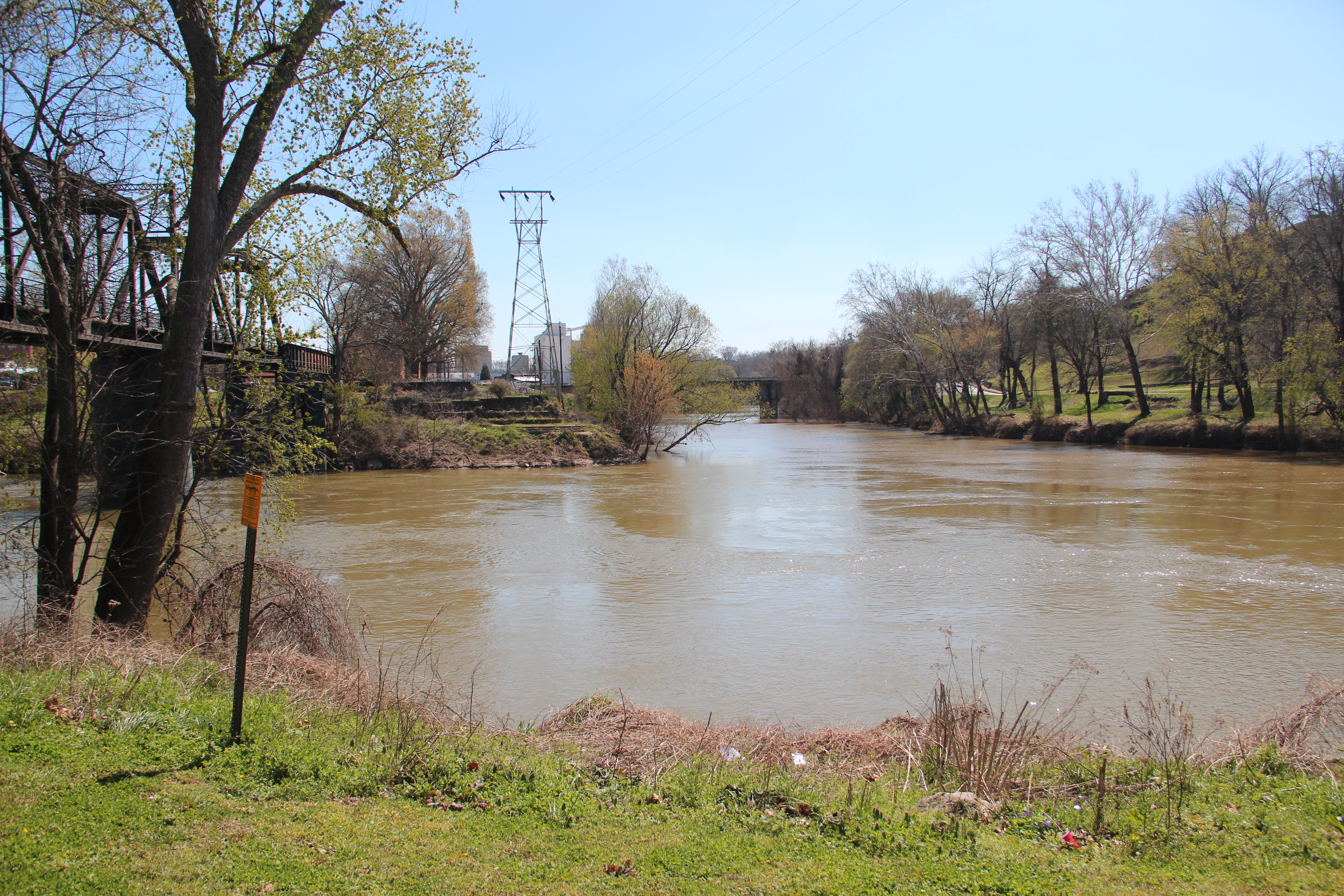
The Coosa River is formed at the confluence of the Oostanaula and Etowah rivers in Rome, Georgia

The Coosa River's drainage has hundreds of tributaries, which have been divided into sections based on the different areas of the watershed. The first four sections are tributary systems that converge to form the main artery of the Coosa River in Georgia. These main tributary rivers are the Conasauga and Coosawattee Rivers, which together then form the Oostanaula River. The Oostanaula then joins with the Etowah River in Rome, Georgia, forming the Coosa River.

Other significant tributaries of the Coosa are:

- Amicalola Creek
- Armuchee Creek
- Big Wills Creek
- Cartecay River
- Cedar Creek
- Chattooga River
- Chocolocco Creek
- Coahulla River
- Ellijay River
- Hatchett Creek
- Heath Creek
- Little River
- Mill Creek
- Mountain Creek
- Raccoon Creek
- Rock Creek
- Spring Creek
- Sugar Creek
- Terrapin Creek
- Waxahatchee Creek
- Weogufka Creek (through Hatchett Creek)

Location	Tributaries
Rome, GA to Weiss Dam	Cedar Creek, Chattooga River, Spring Creek, Cowan River, Little River, Yellow Creek
Weiss Dam to H. Neely Henry Dam	Ballplay Creek, Cove Creek, Henley Creek, Canoe Creek, Permita Creek, Green's Creek, Beaver Creek, Ottery Creek, Shoal Creek
H. Neely Henry Dam to Logan Martin Dam	Acker Creek, Blue Eye Creek, Blue Spring Branch, Broken Arrow Creek, Cane Creek, Choccolocco Creek, Clear Creek, Cropwell Branch, Dye Creek, Easonville Creek, Fishing Creek, Haw Branch, Ohatchee Creek, Poorhouse Branch, Rabbit Branch, Trout Creek
Logan Martin Dam to Lay Dam	Kelly Creek, Talladega Creek, Tallaseehatchee Creek, Dry Branch, Bulley Creek, Beeswax Creek, Flat Branch, Cedar Creek, Sulphur Creek, Peckerwood Creek, Spring Creek, Blue Springs Creek, Reid Creek, Coaggie Creek, Waxahatchee Creek, Paint Creek
Lay Dam to Mitchell Dam	Clay Creek, Walnut Creek, Hatchet Creek, Pennymotley Creek, Weougufka Creek, Cargile Creek, Blue Creek
Mitchell Dam to Jordan Dam	Chesnut Creek, Shoals Creek, Weoka Creek, Sofkahatchee Creek
Jordan Dam to Confluence of Tallapoosa River	Corn Creek

== Major cities ==
A number of significant cities lie on the banks of the Coosa River. They include:

- Gadsden, Alabama - between Weiss and H. Neely Henry lakes
- Rainbow City, Alabama - on the Coosa due south of Gadsden
- Childersburg, Alabama - near Lay Lake
- Rome, Georgia - headwaters
- Southside, Alabama - on the Coosa due south of Rainbow City
- Wetumpka, Alabama - near confluence with Tallapoosa River forming the Alabama River
- Pell City, Alabama - on Coosa River at Logan Martin Lake

== Advocates ==
The Coosa-Alabama River Improvement Association, founded in 1890 in Gadsden, Alabama to promote navigation on the Coosa River is a leading advocate of the economic, recreational and environmental benefits of the Coosa River system.

The Alabama Rivers Alliance works to unite the citizens of Alabama to protect peoples right to clean, healthy, waters.

Alabama Water Watch is dedicated to volunteer citizen monitoring of water quality in Alabama Rivers.

The Alabama Power Foundation is a non-profit foundation providing grants for watershed, environmental and community projects along the Coosa River and within the state of Alabama.

The Coosa River Basin Initiative is a grassroots environmental organization with the mission of informing and empowering citizens so that they may become involved in the process of creating a clean, healthy and economically viable Coosa River Basin.

Coosa Riverkeeper is a citizen-based river conservation group that patrols the river, educates the public and advocates on behalf of the river. The staffed organization is based on Yellowleaf Creek and works in the Middle and Lower Coosa Basins.

== See also ==
- List of rivers of Georgia (U.S. state)
- List of rivers of Alabama
- List of dams and reservoirs in Alabama
