= Carrera Panamericana =

Sports car race held in Mexico

The Carrera Panamericana was a border-to-border sedan (stock and touring and sports car) rally racing event on open roads in Mexico similar to the Mille Miglia and Targa Florio in Italy. Running for five consecutive years from 1950 to 1954, it was widely held by contemporaries to be the most dangerous race of any type in the world. It has since been resurrected along some of the original course as a classic speed rally.

== Original ==
=== 1950 ===
After the 2,178 mile (3,507 kilometer) north-south Mexican section of the Pan-American Highway was completed in 1950, a nine-stage, five-day race across the country was organized by the national government to celebrate its achievement and attract international business. The 1950 race ran almost entirely along the new roadway.

The first of five annual races began on May 5, 1950, and was entered by racers from all over the world representing virtually every motor sport: Formula One, sports cars, rallying, stock cars, endurance racing, hill climbing, and drag racing. Because it started at the border with Texas, it was especially attractive to all types of American race drivers from Indy cars to NASCAR. Bill France Sr., the founder of NASCAR, was there for the first race as well as later races. The Mexican government's representatives worked closely with the American Automobile Association and other motor sports groups in the United States to organize and promote the event which was limited to stock sedans with five seats. Piero Taruffi and Felice Bonetto, both Italian F1 drivers, entered a pair of Alfa Romeo coupes specially constructed for the event. However, many of the 132 competitors were ordinary unsponsored citizens from the United States, Mexico, and elsewhere. The entrants included nine women drivers.

The first race ran from north to south beginning in Ciudad Juárez, Chihuahua, across the international border from El Paso, Texas, and finishing in Ciudad Cuauhtémoc, Chiapas (formerly known as El Ocotal) on the Guatemala–Mexico border opposite from La Mesilla, Guatemala. The event comprised nine "legs" or stage. At least one leg was run each day for five consecutive days. The elevation changes were significant: from 328 feet (100 m) to 10,482 feet (3,195 m) above sea level, requiring among other modifications the rejetting of carburetors to cope with thinner air. Most of the race was run between 5,000 feet (1,500 m) and 8,000 feet (2,400 m).

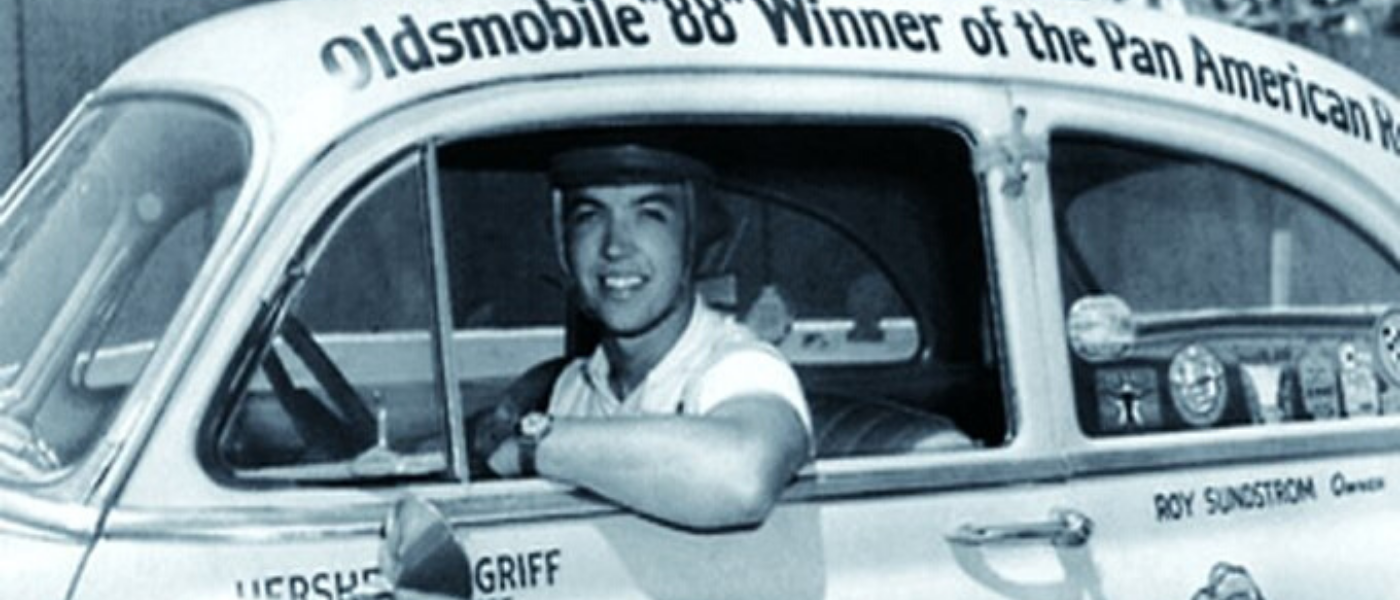
Hershel McGriff in his winning Oldsmobile 88

The first four places were won by American cars and American drivers. The winner, Hershel McGriff, drove an Oldsmobile 88 at an average speed of 142 km/h (88 mph). The car cost McGriff and his partners only $1,900, when the winner's purse was 150,000 pesos (around $17,200 U.S. dollars). Though less powerful than its big Lincoln and Cadillac competitors, the car was substantially lighter. This meant that it would eventually pull away from them on the steep, winding course. The car's light weight gave it another advantage: it was much easier to stop, meaning that McGriff finished the race on his original brake shoes when the big cars were re-shoeing every night. This was important because neither McGriff nor his co-driver were capable of even basic car maintenance. McGriff also noted that the control afforded by his manual gearbox gave him a significant advantage the last day on the gravel roads in Chiapas, when he finally passed the Cadillac leading the race. The final miles to the finish were run without oil due to bottoming out the oil pans leaving the engine smoking and rattling to the checkered flag. The best placed European car was an Alfa Romeo sedan driven by Italian driver, Felice Bonetto. The race, however, set its bloody and dangerous reputation right from the start: 4 people (3 competitors, 1 spectator) were killed during this event.

=== 1951 ===
The following year, the race was run from south to north, starting in Tuxtla Gutiérrez, Chiapas on the Mexican/Guatemalan border and finishing in Ciudad Juárez, Chihuahua on the Mexican/U.S. Texas border near El Paso. This was changed from the previous event because of the lack of accommodation available for race officials, drivers, crews and press in El Ocotal and the jungle. This northerly direction also allowed the U.S. drivers to finish at their border. The race was moved from early May to late November to avoid the hot and rainy weather at that time of year in Mexico and to give the European teams a chance to compete during what was normally their off-season. For the first time, a European manufacturer entered a 'factory' team, Ferrari entering several cars including a 212 Export LWB Vignale. Although the Ferrari entries did not technically satisfy the requirements of the touring car category, the Italians were permitted to compete anyway.

The race would prove to exact a heavy toll upon drivers. During the first stage, José Estrada and Miguel González died after their 1951 Packard left the road and fell 630 feet (190 m) into a ravine. Estrada was an experienced racer and car dealer, who had announced at the start of the race: "I will win, or die trying." The next day Italian driver Carlos Panini also died after an accident. Panini was a pioneer of Mexican aviation who established Mexico's first scheduled airline in 1927. He is credited with being the first pilot to fly a light plane around the world. The fatal accident occurred on the second day, during the second stage from Oaxaca to Puebla. Although the registered driver for the race was Carlos' daughter Teresa, he was at the wheel of a 1949 Alfa Romeo 6C 2500 SS despite poor health and not having a valid license. The accident happened while a young Bobby Unser was trying to overtake Panini in a Jaguar, as Unser related in his book Winners Are Driven: A Champion's Guide to Success in Business & Life:

On the second day, we were in seventeenth and coming up to pass the car of millionaire Carlos Panini and his daughter, Terresita. She was the registered driver. However, Carlos was behind the wheel instead and was in ill health. He shouldn't have been driving. He didn't even have a driver's license. The rules were that the slower car was to allow the faster car to pass if the faster car honked its horn. We were in the mountains, and I came up to Carlos and honked, but he wouldn't let me pass. This went on through about ten turns, with Carlos blocking me each time. We were probably doing about 90 miles per hour at this point. The next time I tried to pass him, he bumped my right-front fender, which almost pushed me off a sheer cliff to the left that was some 500 to 800 feet down. My left front tire went over the edge, but fortunately I regained control of the car. Carlos over-corrected his car to the right, and went straight into a solid rock wall. The car exploded on impact like an egg hitting a sidewalk. I didn't know it at the time, but Carlos was killed instantly. One of the rules of the race was if you stopped to help anyone, you were automatically disqualified... Seeing the explosive impact, I wanted to stop to help, but daddy told me to keep going. He knew the rules and told me that people were there to help. That was hard for me - I slowed down to about 15 or 20 miles per hour. He insisted that I keep going, and grimly, I did.

— Bobby Unser,

Ricardo Ramírez of Mexico City abandoned the race to rush the Paninis to a hospital in Puebla, but Señor Panini was announced dead on arrival. His daughter survived with minor injuries. The deaths of Panini and Estrada resulted in denunciations of the race by Mexico City's El Universal newspaper, who called the race a "crime", and by a government official who stated the race was "an imitation of North American customs not suited to Mexican characteristics." 4 people were killed during this edition of the Carrera Panamericana: in addition to Panini, Estrada and González's deaths, the mayor of Oaxaca, Lorenzo Mayoral Lemus, lost his life during a run of the first stage between the cities of Tuxtla Gutiérrez and Oaxaca. His car went off a mountain road and he died in a hospital in Oaxaca.

First and second places were won by the works Ferraris 212 Inters driven by Piero Taruffi and Alberto Ascari, third and fourth by ordinary American cars. Bill Sterling, a salesman from El Paso, Texas, placed third in a Chrysler Saratoga entered by Carl Kiekhaefer of the Mercury Marine boat motor manufacturer, and well-known race car driver Troy Ruttman followed him in a flat-head V8 Mercury Eight he reportedly had bought for $1,000 in a used car lot in El Monte, California yet bested several factory Lancias and Ferraris.

=== 1952 ===
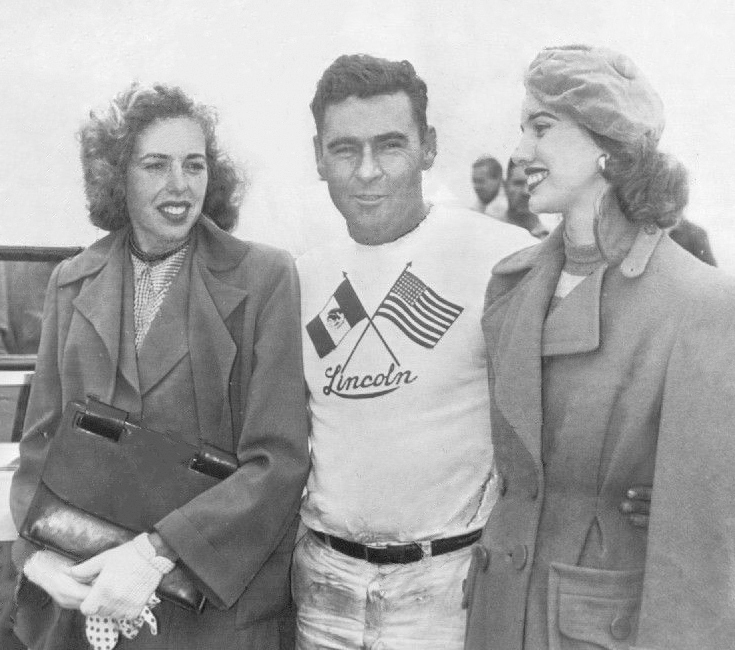
Chuck Stevenson after his class victory in the 1952 Carrera Panamericana

In 1952 the organizers of Carrera Panamericana divided what had been a single class into Sports Car and Stock Car entries so heavy American sedans did not have to compete directly with nimble European sports cars. The major automobile manufacturers had taken notice of the race and Mercedes-Benz sent a highly organized team of drivers, mechanics, and new Mercedes-Benz 300 SL (W194) that already had won major races, especially Le Mans, but these cars were carbureted and had less power than the later fuel-injected roadgoing 300 SL (W198). Karl Kling/Hans Klenk and Hermann Lang finished first and second, and a 1-2-3 finish may have been the final result had American John Fitch not been disqualified for permitting a mechanic to touch his car on the second to last day.

Klenk used pre-prepared 'pacenotes' to identify and communicate upcoming road bends in rapid shorthand to Kling. This preparation was also used by Mercedes for the 1955 Mille Miglia which was won by Moss/Jenkinson while Fangio and Kling drove solo, and Hans Herrmann with a mechanic. This system proved so effective that it is used in all motor sports involving a navigator today, such as rallying. The highly organized Lincoln teams also used a similar system. American Chuck Stevenson won the touring car class in a Lincoln Capri, his first of two consecutive victories in the event.

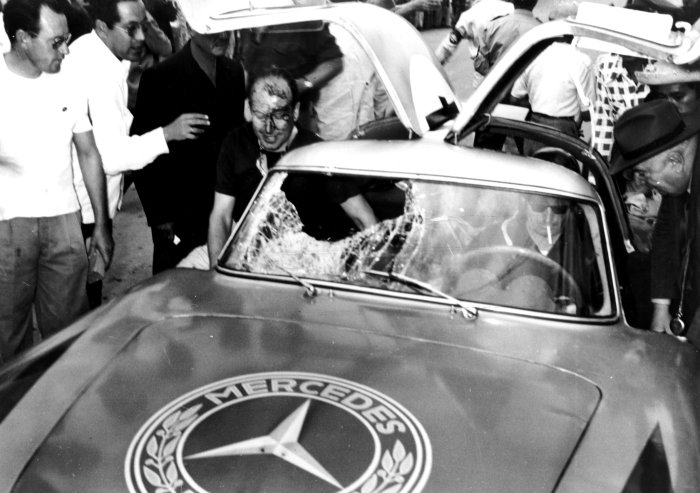
The Mercedes 300 SL of K. Kling & H. Klenk following the impact of a vulture to the windscreen

The Mercedes-Benz W194 of Kling and Hans Klenk won despite the car being hit by a vulture in the windscreen. During a long right-hand bend in the opening stage taken at almost 200 km/h (120 mph), Kling failed to spot vultures sitting by the side of the road. As the birds scattered at the roar of the virtually unsilenced 300 SL, one impacted through the windscreen on the passenger side, briefly knocking co-driver and navigator Klenk unconscious. Despite bleeding badly from facial injuries caused by the shattered windscreen, Klenk ordered Kling to maintain speed, and held on until a tire change almost 70 km (43 mi) later to clean himself and the car up. For extra protection, eight vertical steel bars were bolted over the new windscreen. Kling and Klenk also discussed the species and size of the dead bird, agreeing that had had a minimum 115-centimetre (45 in) wingspan and weighed as much as five fattened geese.

'Only' one person was killed in this event, Santos Letona of Puebla, Mexico, who died in a crash near the town of Texmelucan on the third stage between there and Mexico City.

=== 1953 ===
In 1953 the Sports and Stock classes were both subdivided into Large and Small groups, giving four categories in which to compete. These were split by engine cubic capacity; sports cars under and over 1600 cc were Small and Large respectively, and stock cars under and over 3500 cc likewise. This was to accommodate the huge number of participants and the diverse breeds of cars within the race. This race, like the subsequent running of the Carrera Panamericana was to be the last round of the 1953 World Sportscar Championship season.

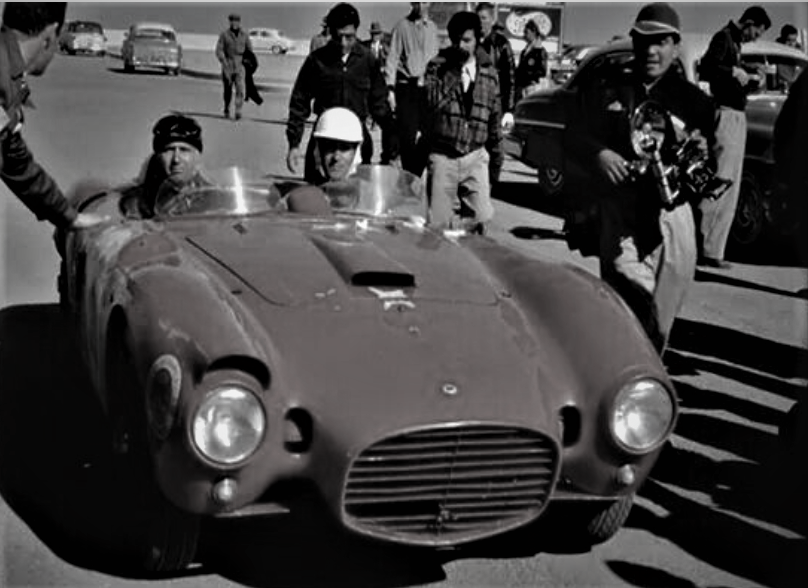
Fangio in his Lancia D24, which won the Large Sports Cars class in 1953

Both Lincoln and Lancia came to the race highly organized and both factories swept 1-2-3 finishes in their respective categories. The Mercedes team did not return because of its focus on Formula One. The Europeans dominated the sports categories, and the Americans the stock. Large Sports Cars was won by Juan Manuel Fangio of Argentina in a Lancia, Small Sports Cars by José Herrarte from Guatemala in a Porsche. Large Stock Cars was won by Chuck Stevenson of the United States in a Lincoln and Small Stock Cars by C.D. Evans (again of the U.S.) in an ordinary six cylinder Chevrolet. Stevenson has the distinction of being the only person to ever win twice in the same category in the original race.

However, the race was marred by the death of a number of competitors. The co-driver and pacenote systems championed by the Mercedes teams of the previous year were vindicated by the failure of an alternative contemporary system used by some other works drivers, notably those of Lancia who in 1953 year had entered five cars; three 3.3-litre D24s for Felice Bonetto, Juan Manuel Fangio and Piero Taruffi, winner of the 1951 edition of the race, and two 3-litre versions for Giovanni Bracco and Eugenio Castellotti. During pre-race runs of the route at much safer speeds, Bonetto and Taruffi painted warning signals on the road to remind themselves of particular hazards. As the D24 was both open and single-seat, there was no co-driver. This resulted in the death of Bonetto who, leading the race under pressure from Taruffi, missed his own warning signs. Entering the village of Silao, he encountered a dip in the pavement at excessive speed and impacted a building, killing him instantly.

The 1953 running was the bloodiest year of the Carrera Panamericana. In addition to Bonetto's death- 8 other people were killed in unrelated accidents, including an incident where 6 spectators were killed by a flipping car. On the first stage between the cities of Tuxtla Gutiérrez and Oaxaca, American Bob Christie, with his mechanic Kenneth Wood, failed to make a left turn, and his Ford went off the road backwards. The car plunged over the embankment on the side and came to a cushioned but smashing stop upside down in the mud of the river bank, below the level of the highway. Christie unfastened his belts and helped "K" to reach the bank. A fairly large crowd of spectators hastily assembled on a ledge below the road to find a better view of the accident. Many of these spectators swarmed to Christie's and Wood's aid immediately and were relieved to find out that both were uninjured. But then, Mickey Thompson, a Bonneville Salt Flats record holder, crashed at the same place after his brakes jammed. Thomson's car went straight into the embankment and killed 6 people who were standing there to get a better view of Christie's accident. In addition to this horrific tragedy, Italians Antonio Stagnoli and his co-driver Giuseppe Scotuzzi in a Ferrari 375 MM lost their lives when a blown tyre caused them to crash in the small town of Juchitán de Zaragoza on that same first stage between Tuxtla Guitierrez and Oaxaca. Of the 9 fatalities in this running of this most famous Mexican road races, 8 of them were on the same stage on the same day. The exception was Bonetto's accident, which happened on the fourth stage.

=== 1954 ===
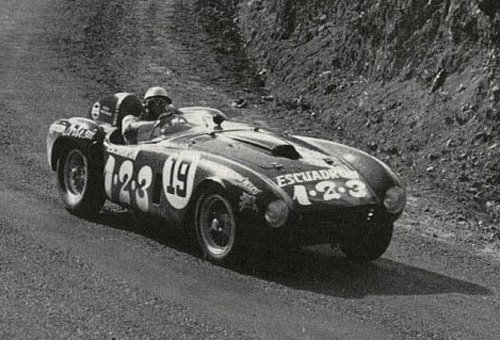
The Ferrari 375 Plus of Umberto Maglioli, winner of the 1954 race

By 1954 the race had shifted from a largely amateurish basis to become a highly professional endeavor. The final stage was won by eventual race winner Umberto Maglioli in a Ferrari 375 Plus at an average speed of 222 kilometres per hour (138 mph) over the 365 kilometres (227 mi) stage. Maglioli would win this race with a combined time of 17 hours and 40 minutes. In comparison, McGriff had won the 1950 race with a combined time of 27 hours and 34 minutes, almost ten hours slower than Maglioli. Maglioli was more than an hour faster than Klenk/Kling in their Mercedes W194 two years earlier. Even with the route shortened by 160 km (100 mi) for 1951 onwards, speeds had gone up more than 50 percent over four years. Phil Hill earned second place in an earlier Ferrari 375 MM with Ray Crawford winning the stock car class in a Lincoln. Two new classes were in effect in 1954; the European stock car class was won by Sanesi, of Italy, in an Alfa Romeo and the small U.S. stock car class was won by Tommy Drisdale in a Dodge. Californian hot rod pioneer Ak Miller (born Arkton Moeller in Denmark, not to be confused with A. K. Miller) became famous by winning fifth place in his Oldsmobile powered 1927 Ford body on a 1950 Ford frame, "El Caballo del Hierro" (The Iron Horse), nicknamed by Mexicans as "El Ensalada" (the salad).

The race, however, lived up to its bloody reputation – seven people were killed during this event: four competitors, two spectators, and one team crew member.

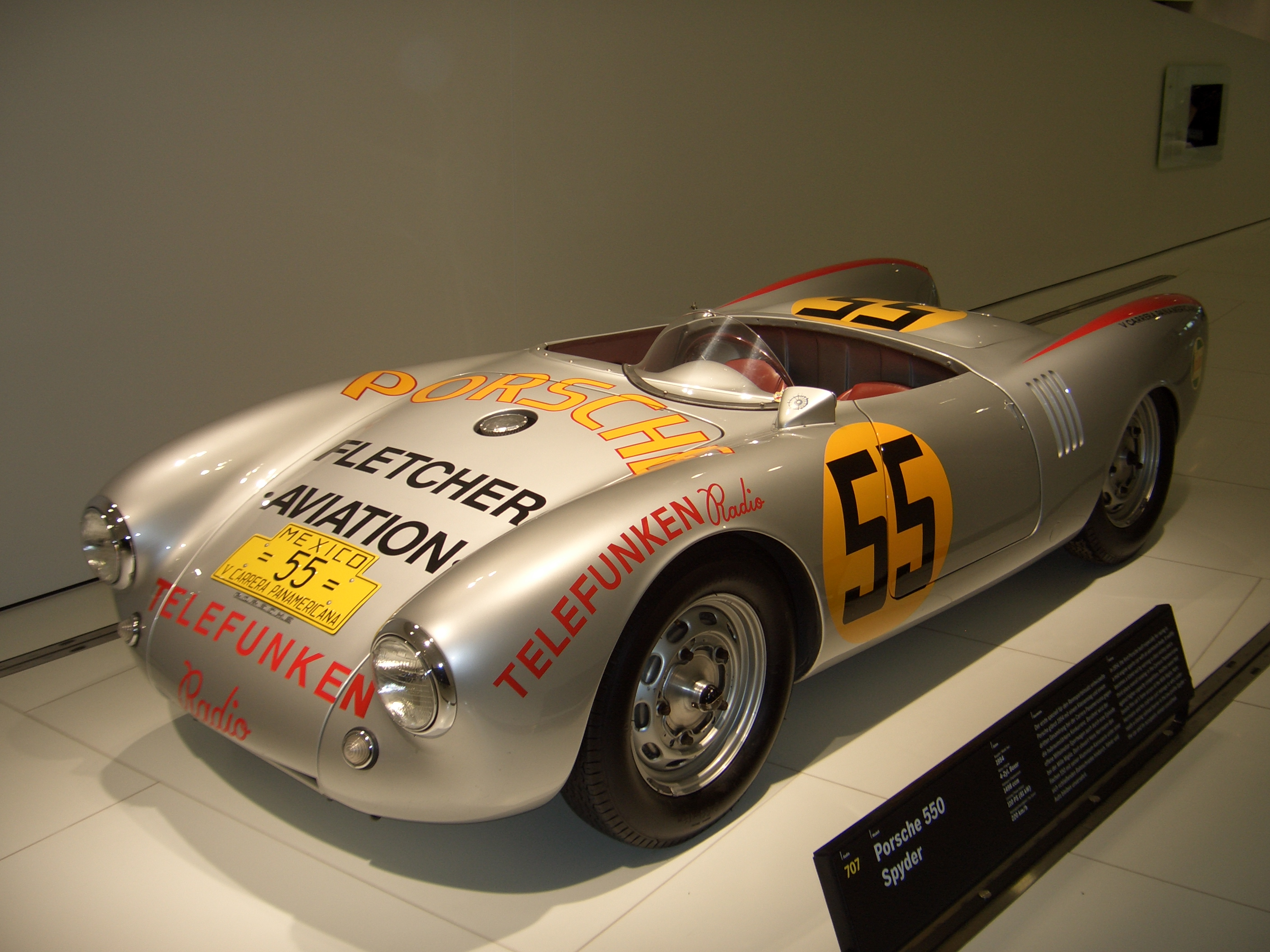
Porsche 550 of Hans Herrmann, which placed 1st in the Sport category of less than 1500 c.c. in 1954 race

=== Cancellation ===
Due to safety concerns and the expense to the government, the race was cancelled after the 1955 Le Mans disaster, although President Adolfo Ruiz Cortines announced only that the race's original task of publicizing the highway was 'complete'. 27 people had died during the five years of the Panamericana, giving it one of the highest mortality rates per race in the history of motor sports. Only a third of entrants typically finished the race. Unlike more compact circuits, the long stage sections were impossible to secure entirely, making it possible for crashes to linger for several hours before being noticed. During the years the race was originally held, racing automobile technology and performance advanced quickly and racing speeds almost doubled as a result. Despite the increased speed, safety controls remained static and competitors, spectators and safety control personnel alike became casualties.

== Legacy ==
Despite being abandoned, the race would not be immediately forgotten. Despite their models being small and often quite underpowered (especially with regard to American and other German opponents) Porsche enjoyed some success in the race, mainly class wins. A 550 Spyder won the Small Sports Car category in 1953.

Later, some Porsche road cars were named Carrera after this race (in the same theme as the Targas named after the Targa Florio), and in 2009 the company shipped the Panamera, a 4-door touring car with a name inspired by Panamericana. Similarly, the watchmaker Heuer, then known for its motorsport stopwatches, introduced a chronograph called the "Carrera Panamerica" after the 1953 race, which developed into its long-running 'Carrera' range.

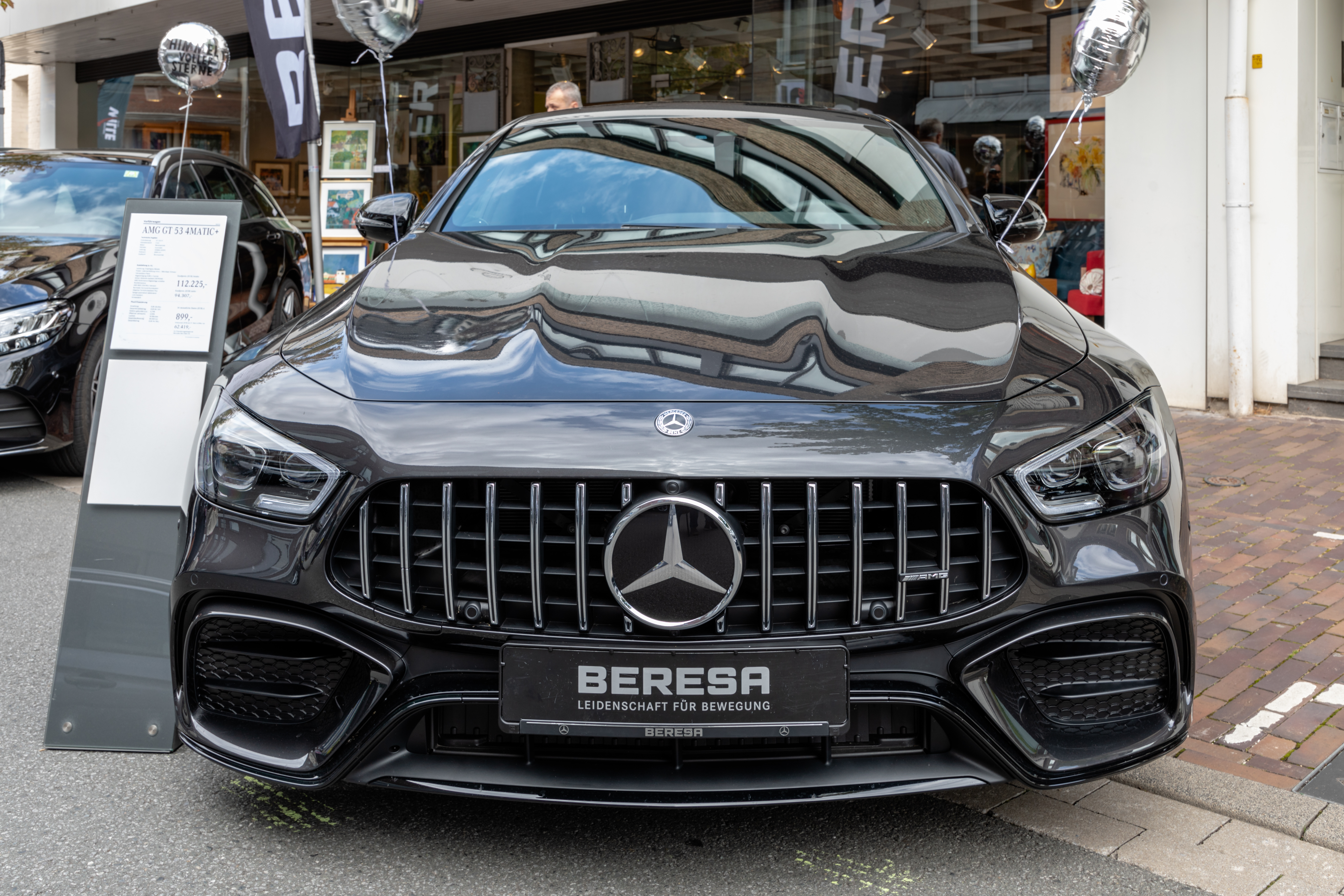
Panamericana Grille as seen on a 2019 Mercedes-AMG GT 53 4MATIC+ 4 door Coupé

In the same way, Mercedes-AMG (high performance division of Mercedes-Benz road cars) named a new grille after this race: the Panamericana-Grille can be found on almost all AMG vehicles starting from 2018.

Also, the race saw famous people from different forms of auto racing converge in one event, including:

- Bill France Sr., Curtis Turner, Red Byron, Raymond Parks and Marshall Teague of stock car racing
- Mickey Thompson, Clay Smith and Ak Miller, famous hot-rodders
- Tony Bettenhausen, Walt Faulkner, Jerry Unser and Bill Vukovich from open wheel 'Indy' car racing
- Alberto Ascari and Juan Manuel Fangio, Formula One champions at the time; and Phil Hill, who would later be a Formula One champion
- Carroll Shelby, creator of the Shelby Cobra and 1959 24 Hours of Le Mans winner, broke his arm while practicing for the 1954 event
- Dan Gurney and Richie Ginther, American road racers who would one day drive for Ferrari in Formula One
- Jean Trévoux, Robert Manzon, Louis Chiron from France, winners of the 24 Hours of Le Mans as well as major international rallies
- Hermann Lang, Karl Kling and Hans Herrmann from Germany
- Piero Taruffi, Umberto Maglioli and Felice Bonetto, all already famous Italian race drivers.

== Revival ==
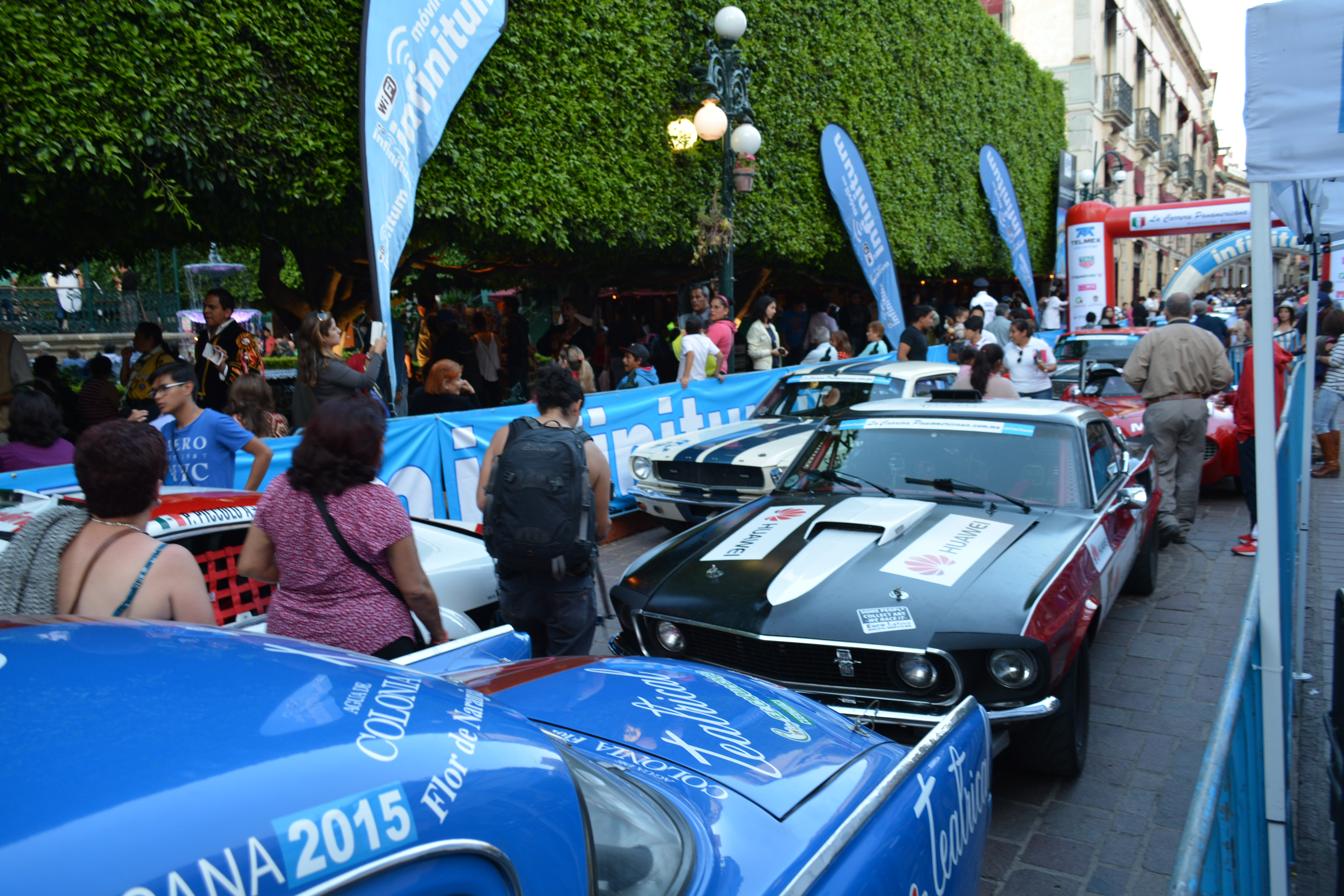
Participating cars and spectators of the 2015 Carrera Panamericana in Guanajuato City

The race was resurrected in 1988 by Pedro Dávila, Loyal Truesdale, and Eduardo de León Camargo, and runs a 7-day, 2,000-mile (3,200 km) route aping some of the original course. It is run with official backing on special closed stages of the public road network and fast transit sections through central Mexico until recently at unlimited speeds approaching 180 mph (290 km/h). The race is competed by 80 to 100 cars organized into 10 classes, which are differentiated by car age and authenticity; virtually any car with a classic bodyshell is eligible. The bulk of entries are provided by 1950s and '60s American stock cars; the most popular shapes are the 1953/54 Studebaker Starliner hardtops and Starlight pillared coupes, originally designed by Robert Bouke from the team headlined by famed industrial designer Raymond Loewy, because of their exceptional aerodynamics. This is best proven by the fact that as of 2016, out of 29 modern-era races, 22 have been won by Studebakers. Other common European entries include Alfa Romeo Giuliettas, Jaguar E-types, Porsche 356s & 911s. Rarer cars included Saab 96s, Volvo PV544s, and Jaguar MkII saloons. Porsche 911 and classic Ford Mustangs are extremely popular cars.

However, despite the vintage appearance of the cars, often they conceal underpinnings more closely related to modern NASCAR entries. Tuned V8 engines of more than 500 PS (370 kW; 490 hp) are common, especially in the American cars, and the cars are often created especially for this race and usually ineligible for true vintage events elsewhere. Even less modified cars often have modern disc brakes at all four corners and coolant upgrades to help them survive the punishing course. Six-point roll cages, racing seats, fire-suppression systems, and fuel cells are required in most classes. Drivers and navigators are required to wear two- or three-layer fire-resistant suits, HANS devices, and label their helmets, uniforms, and respective sides of the car with their blood types and allergies.

The above is a clue as to what separates the Panamericana from other modern, re-creations of road races. It remains a true, high-speed race (stage rally) mainly through the mountains, and as such, is extremely dangerous. Mechanical attrition for the more classic cars often leads to burst brake lines and overheated engines, but crashes are also common on the winding roads. In 1999, Bernardo Obregón and his co-driver Alda Arnauda were killed after their Volvo PV544 left the road during the Mil Cumbres mountain stage. In 2006, a 19-year-old co-driver survived a serious head injury that left him in a coma after his Jaguar E-Type Roadster crashed into a pine forest; Rusty Ward, another competitor, rolled a Studebaker from a bridge into a river, having finished the event in a similar fashion the previous year. In 2012 there were two more fatalities, but one was from a heart attack. It is obvious, therefore, that the race should not be classed with road-rallies in the style of the recreated Mille Miglia. However, since 2012 the race cars' top speed is limited to 144 mph on the closed-road sections, by restricting the engine's RPM (engine revolutions per minutes) by a chip in the electric ignition, and additional safety measures have been required.

=== 2006 ===
The 2006 event started in Veracruz on the Gulf of Mexico coast, pulling in at Mexico City's CP circuit as a curtain raiser for the Champ Car race, and stayed nights at the old colonial cities of Puebla, Querétaro, Morelia, Aguascalientes and Zacatecas, with the finish at Monterrey. It was won by Gabriel Perez and Angelica Fuentes in a yellow 1959 Ford Coupe, the first win for a woman and a first for the 'Turismo Production' class. Though competed mostly by amateurs, Jo Ramírez of the McLaren F1 team competed a Volvo P1800 amongst other star drivers.

In a retro step, Cadillac entered a replica of the 1954 Series 62 coupe that a Colorado Springs dealer loaned to "five ordinary guys from Chicago", in order to revive a half-century old duel with Lincoln. The original 1954 team won the last two stages, and finished third in class (a Lincoln Capri won the Large Stock Class). The newer car, built in-house by GM's Performance Division Garage, preproduction trim shop and show-car paint department, was built from an identical coupe from somewhere within Cadillac's own inventory. The 331-cubic-inch 270 hp (200 kW) V8 was enlarged to 398-cubic-inches, with higher 10.5:1 compression bringing output to 375 hp (280 kW) and 400 lb⋅ft (540 N⋅m) of torque, and certain safety improvements included. The car was reunited with Blu Plemons, the co-driver of the original (the driver, Keith Anderson, was killed in practice for the 1957 Indy 500) at the starting line. Among the nine other entries in the "Original Pan-Am" class were four Lincolns, including a 1949 model that contested the original Pan-Am.

2006 also saw the debut of a 'modern' category, with the sole entry of a Lotus Elise ('Chica Loca') run by Rachel Larratt. This class, called Unlimited, allows machines manufactured after 1990 to compete in the race. Controversially, in recognition of the high value of some of the supercars thus allowed to run, organizers of the race foresee the need to allow case-by-case exceptions from the race's normal safety equipment rules. The class is intended to raise the race's profile beyond a market elderly enough to recall the original four races, to ensure the survival of the event. Also, it is a reflection of the increasing scarcity of eligible vehicles, and of the effect of modern rallies like the Gumball 3000.

=== 2007 ===
The 2007 event, according to Eduardo de León Camargo (President emeritus of La Carrera Panamericana), was the largest recreation to date. More than 100 teams participated in seven days of racing from October 26 to November 1 inclusive, with an additional pre-qualifying stage held outside Oaxaca on Thursday October 25. Cars competed in the usual ten classes along a 3,100-kilometre (1,900 mi) course starting in Oaxaca. From there, the route led the convoy in day-long sections consecutively between Tehuacán, Puebla, Querétaro, Morelia, Aguascalientes, Zacatecas and Nuevo Laredo.

As the 20th anniversary of the race's recreation, 2007 saw Mr. de León gave thanks to the committee which has for 19 years organized the race, and the presence of President of the Mexican Motorsports Federation, José Sánchez Jassen, and President of the Mexican Rally Commission, Rafael Machado. During the conference announcing the route, special mention was reserved for the efforts of Mexican law enforcement in general and of the Highway Patrol in particular, under the command of Comandante Julio Cesar Tovar, and to thank Mexican Federal, State and Municipal authorities for collaborating to ensure smooth running of a challenging project.

== Winners ==
=== Original Carrera Panamericana ===
Year	Winning driver(s)	Entrant	Car	Time	Route	Report
1950	(United States) Hershel McGriff (United States) Ray Elliott	(United States) McGriff Racing	Oldsmobile 88	27:34:25	Ciudad Juárez-El Ocotal	report
1951	(Italy) Piero Taruffi (United States) Luigi Chinetti	(Italy) Centro Deportivo Italiano	Ferrari 212 Inter Vignale	21:57:52	Tuxtla Gutiérrez-Ciudad Juárez	report
1952	(West Germany) Karl Kling (West Germany) Hans Klenk	(West Germany) Daimler-Benz AG	Mercedes-Benz W194	18:51:19	Tuxtla Gutiérrez-Ciudad Juárez	report
1953	(Argentina) Juan Manuel Fangio (Italy) Gino Bronzoni	(Italy) Scuderia Lancia	Lancia D24 Pinin Farina	18:11:00	Tuxtla Gutiérrez-Ciudad Juárez	report
1954	(Italy) Umberto Maglioli	(Mexico) Escuadrón 1-2-3 Santiago Ontañón (United States) Erwin Goldschmidt	Ferrari 375 Plus Pinin Farina	17:40:26	Tuxtla Gutiérrez-Ciudad Juárez	report

=== Revival ===
Year	Route	Winning driver	Co-driver	Car
1988		(Mexico) Eduardo Morales	(Mexico) Gael Rodriguez	Ford
1989		(Mexico) Guillermo Rojas	(Mexico) Alberto Rojas Jr.	Mercury
1990		(United Kingdom) Alain de Cadenet	(United Kingdom) Gordon Currie	Jaguar
1991		(United States) Jon Ward	(United States) Shirley Ward	Kurtis
1992		(United States) Peter Frank	(United States) Mark Williams	Mercury
1993		(Mexico) Carlos Anaya	(Mexico) Eduardo Rodriguez	Studebaker
1994		(Mexico) Carlos Anaya (2)	(Mexico) Eduardo Rodriguez	Studebaker
1995		(United States) Kevin Ward	(United States) Kimberlee Augustine	Studebaker
1996		(Mexico) Carlos Anaya (3)	(Mexico) Eduardo Rodriguez	Studebaker
1997		(France) Pierre de Thoisy	(France) Philippe Lemoine	Studebaker
1998		(France) Pierre de Thoisy (2)	(France) Philippe Lemoine	Studebaker
1999		(France) Pierre de Thoisy (3)	(France) Jean-Pierre Gontier	Studebaker
2000	Tuxtla Gutiérrez-Nuevo Laredo	(France) Pierre de Thoisy (4)	(France) Jacques Tropenat	Studebaker
2001	Tuxtla Gutiérrez-Nuevo Laredo	(France) Pierre de Thoisy (5)	(Costa Rica) Carlos Macaya	Studebaker
2002	Tuxtla Gutiérrez-Nuevo Laredo	(United States) Doug Mockett	(United Kingdom) Alan Baillie	Oldsmobile
2003	Tuxtla Gutiérrez-Nuevo Laredo	(France) Pierre de Thoisy (6)	(Belgium) Pierre Schockaert	Studebaker
2004	Tuxtla Gutiérrez-Nuevo Laredo	(Mexico) Juan Carlos Sarmiento	(Mexico) Raúl Villarreal	Studebaker
2005	Tuxtla Gutiérrez-Nuevo Laredo	(Mexico) Juan Carlos Sarmiento (2)	(Mexico) Raúl Villarreal	Studebaker
2006	Veracruz-Monterrey	(Mexico) Gabriel Pérez	(Mexico) Angelica Fuentes	Ford
2007	Oaxaca-Nuevo Laredo	(France) Pierre de Thoisy (7)	(France) Frédéric Stoesser	Studebaker
2008	Tuxtla Gutiérrez-Nuevo Laredo	(United States) Bill Beilharz	(Mexico) Jorge Ceballos	Studebaker
2009	Huatulco-Nuevo Laredo	(Sweden) Stig Blomqvist	(Venezuela) Ana Goñi Boracco	Studebaker
2010	Tuxtla Gutiérrez-Zacatecas	(Finland) Harri Rovanperä	(Finland) Jouni Närhi	Studebaker
2011	Huatulco-Zacatecas	(Mexico) Ricardo Triviño	(Mexico) Marco Hernández	Studebaker
2012	Veracruz-Zacatecas	(Mexico) Gabriel Pérez (2)	(Mexico) Ignacio Rodríguez	Studebaker
2013	Veracruz-Zacatecas	(Mexico) Gabriel Pérez (3)	(Mexico) Ignacio Rodríguez	Studebaker
2014	Veracruz-Durango	(France) Érik Comas	(Switzerland) Isabelle de Sadeleer	Studebaker
2015	Tuxtla Gutiérrez-Durango	(Mexico) Emilio Vázquez	(Mexico) Javier Marín	Studebaker
2016	Santiago de Querétaro-Durango	(France) Hilaire Damiron	(Brazil) Laura Damiron	Studebaker

== See also ==
- Cannonball Baker Sea-to-Shining-Sea Memorial Trophy Dash
- La Carrera Panamericana - a 1992 retrospective documentary made by the British band Pink Floyd about the race.
- Porsche's Carrera, Panamera, and Panamericana
