= 2009 Carrera Panamericana =

The 2009 edition of the Carrera Panamericana Mexican sports car racing event started in Huatulco, Oaxaca and finished in Nuevo Laredo, Tamaulipas. This edition was composed of 7 stages. The Swedish Stig Blomqvist won this edition. Ana Goni was his co-driver.

== Results ==
=== Overall ===
Place	Driver	Co-driver	Car	Time
1	(Sweden) Stig Blomqvist	(Venezuela) Ana Goni	Studebaker	4:42:28
2	(Sweden) Lars Stugemo	(Sweden) Jonny Olofsson	Studebaker	+7:32
3	(Mexico) Alejandro Pimientel	(Mexico) Mauricio Pimientel	Dodge	+8:55
4	(Mexico) Francisco Márquez García	(Mexico) Araceli Ramírez Islas	Hudson	+16:40
5	(United States) Karl Scheible	(United States) Dyana Marlett	Volvo	+22:16
6	(Mexico) Francisco Javier Tato	(Mexico) Cesar Javier Robles	Studebaker	+23:32
7	(United States) Edward Hugo	(Mexico) Marco Hernández	LT Special	+23:35
8	(France) Hilaire Damiron	(Mexico) Manuel Iguíniz	Buick	+25:37
9	(Mexico) Carlos Castillo	(Mexico) Carlos Antonio Ramírez	Studebaker	+28:33
10	(Mexico) Enrique Nava	(Mexico) José Luis Pérez Rubio	Porsche 911	+28:52

=== By Category ===
Category	Driver	Co-driver	Car	Time
Turismo Mayor	(Sweden) Stig Blomqvist	(Venezuela) Ana Goni	Studebaker	4:42:28
Turismo Producción	(Mexico) Carlos Castillo	(Mexico) Carlos Antonio Ramírez	Studebaker	5:11:01
Historic A	(United States) Robert Curry	(United States) Rick Shaw	Porsche	6:28:40
Historic A+	(United States) Richard Bailey	(United States) Nate Wilson	Volvo	5:24:27
Historic B	(Mexico) Enrique Nava	(Mexico) José Luis Pérez Rubio	Porsche 911	5:11:20
Historic C	(United States) Bill Shannahan	(United States) Murray Smith	Ford Falcon	5:11:42
Original Panam	(Canada) John Gregory	(Canada) Chrislana Gregory	Studebaker	5:41:17
Sport Mayor	(United States) Edward Hugo	(Mexico) Marco Hernández	LT Special	5:06:03
Sport Menor	(United States) Richard Clark	(United States) Andrew Prill	Porsche	5:24:27
Exhibition	(Mexico) Michel Jourdain Jr.	(Mexico) Miguel Angel Díez	Studebaker	5:26:09

== Stages ==
Day	Stage	Route	Driver	Co-Driver	Car	link
October 23	Stage 1	Huatulco-Oaxaca de Juárez	(Sweden) Stig Blomqvist	(Venezuela) Ana Goni	Studebaker	Results
October 24	Stage 2	Oaxaca de Juárez-Mexico City	(Sweden) Stig Blomqvist	(Venezuela) Ana Goni	Studebaker	Results
October 25	Stage 3	Mexico City-Santiago de Querétaro	(Sweden) Stig Blomqvist	(Venezuela) Ana Goni	Studebaker	Results
October 26	Stage 4	Santiago de Querétaro-San Luis Potosí	(United States) Doug Mockett	(Mexico) Angélica Fuentes	Oldsmobile	Results
October 27	Stage 5	San Luis Potosí-Guadalajara	(Mexico) Alejandro Pimientel	(Mexico) Mauricio Pimientel	Dodge	Results
October 28	Stage 6	Guadalajara-Zacatecas	(Mexico) Alejandro Pimientel	(Mexico) Mauricio Pimientel	Dodge	Results
October 29	Stage 7	Zacatecas-Nuevo Laredo	(United States) Doug Mockett	(Mexico) Angélica Fuentes	Oldsmobile	Results
