= 2008 Carrera Panamericana =

The 2008 edition of the Carrera Panamericana Mexican sports car racing event started in Tuxtla Gutiérrez, Chiapas and finished in Nuevo Laredo, Tamaulipas. This edition was composed of 7 stages. Bill Beilharz and Jorge Ceballos won this edition.

== Results ==
=== Overall ===
Place	Driver	Co-driver	Car	Time
1	(United States) Bill Beilharz	(Mexico) Jorge Ceballos	Studebaker	4:15:28
2	(Mexico) Jorge Pedrero	(Mexico) Marco Antonio Hernández	Studebaker	+47
3	(United States) Doug Mockett	(Mexico) Angélica Fuentes	Oldsmobile	+4:56
4	(Sweden) Stig Blomqvist	(Venezuela) Ana Goni	Studebaker	+8:23
5	(Sweden) Lars Stugemo	(Sweden) Jonny Olofsson	Studebaker	+13:34
6	(United States) Richard John Tyzack	(United States) Simon Jefferies	Ford Mustang	+23:57
7	(Mexico) Pedro Pablo García	(Mexico) Jeusep Tunet Rodríguez	Volvo	+26:36
8	(United States) Bill Shanahan	(United States) Murray Smith	Chevrolet	+28:56
9	(Belgium) Marc Davis	Rupert Clevely	Ford	+29:16
10	(Mexico) Carlos Castillo Fregoso	(Mexico) Carlos Ramírez Cornejo	Studebaker	+32:29

=== By class ===
Category	Driver	Co-driver	Car	Time
Turismo Mayor	(United States) Bill Beilharz	(Mexico) Jorge Ceballos	Studebaker	4:15:28
Turismo Producción	(Mexico) Jorge Pedrero	(Mexico) Marco Antonio Hernández	Studebaker	4:16:15
Historic A	(Austria) Lars Kroiss	(Austria) Martin Rettenbacher	Volvo	5:05:06
Historic A+	(Canada) Ulrich Lanius	(Canada) Trevor Gordon Smyth	Alfa Romeo	5:01:04
Historic B	Brian DeVries	Marc Noordeloos	Porsche	4:53:00
Historic C	(United States) Richard John Tyzack	(United States) Simon Jefferies	Ford Mustang	4:39:25
Original Panam	(United States) Carson Schller	Shields Richardson	Ford Victoria	5:07:06
Sport Mayor	Sam Burg	Dyana Marlett	LT	5:05:57
Sport Menor	(United States) Richard Clark	(United States) Andrew Prill	Porsche	4:58:06
Exhibition	Charles Breed	Bernd-Michael Rumpf	Lister-Chevy	4:38:50

== Stages ==
Day	Stage	Route	Driver	Co-Driver	Car	link
October 23	Qualification	Tuxtla Gutiérrez	(Mexico) Jorge Pedrero	(Mexico) Marco Antonio Hernández	Studebaker	Results
October 24	Stage 1	Tuxtla Gutiérrez-Oaxaca de Juárez	(Mexico) Jorge Pedrero	(Mexico) Marco Antonio Hernández	Studebaker	Results
October 25	Stage 2	Oaxaca de Juárez-Mexico City	(United States) Bill Beilharz	(Mexico) Jorge Ceballos	Studebaker	Results
October 26	Stage 3	Mexico City-Santiago de Querétaro	(United States) Bill Beilharz	(Mexico) Jorge Ceballos	Studebaker	Results
October 27	Stage 4	Santiago de Querétaro-San Luis Potosí	(United States) Bill Beilharz	(Mexico) Jorge Ceballos	Studebaker	Results
October 28	Stage 5	San Luis Potosí-Aguascalientes	(Sweden) Stig Blomqvist	(Venezuela) Ana Goni	Studebaker	Results
October 29	Stage 6	Aguascalientes-Zacatecas	(Sweden) Stig Blomqvist	(Venezuela) Ana Goni	Studebaker	Results
October 30	Stage 7	Zacatecas-Nuevo Laredo	(Mexico) Jorge Pedrero	(Mexico) Marco Antonio Hernández	Studebaker	Results
