= Seminole Speedway =

Former racetrack in Casselberry, Florida

- Location: Casselberry, Florida
- Coordinates: 28.678°N 81.301°W
- Opened: 1945
- Closed: c.1954

Oval (1945–c.1954)
- Surface: Dirt
- Length: 0.25 mi (0.4 km)
- Turns: 4

Oval (1946–c.1948)
- Surface: Dirt
- Length: 1.00 mi (1.61 km)
- Turns: 4

Seminole Speedway was a dirt oval racetrack, located in Casselberry, Florida (near Orlando in central Florida), that opened in 1945 and hosted some of the first stock car racing events following the end of World War II. Roy Hall, Red Byron, and Fireball Roberts were known for competing at the racetrack. Seminole Speedway closed in the mid-1950s and was eventually redeveloped as a residential subdivision.

== History ==
Developed by a group of local investors and promoted by Bill France Sr., who would later become the founder of the National Association for Stock Car Auto Racing (NASCAR), Seminole Speedway was a quarter-mile (0.4-kilometer) dirt oval track, located in Casselberry, Florida, near Orlando, and held its first racing event on December 2, 1945, with Roy Hall beating France in the track's inaugural event. The track hosted the 1945 season finale for the Southeastern States Championship. A one-mile (1.6-kilometer) track was opened at the site in 1946. Red Byron, who would go on to become the first champion in NASCAR's premier series in 1949, won his first stock car event following World War Two at the track, beating Hall, France, and others, driving a Raymond Parks-owned car in February 1946. It was the first race that Byron had entered after 27 months of rehabilitation following being injured by flak as a tail gunner in a B-24 Liberator during the war.

In addition to stock car racing, motorcycle events were held at the track; the 1947 Florida All-Star Motorcycle Races saw a 72-bike starting field and had a $1,500 purse for the event.

Racing events continued at Seminole Speedway during the remainder of the 1940s and into the 1950s. Local driver Fireball Roberts competed regularly at the track in both stock cars and modified events. Seminole Speedway closed around 1954; the location of the track was still visible into the 2000s, but is now a subdivision.
