= Dawson County High School =

Dawson County High School may refer to:

- Dawson County High School (Dawsonville, Georgia)
- Dawson County High School (Dawson County, Montana) Dawson County, Montana#Education
