= Casselberry Art House =

Art gallery in Casselberry, Florida, US

Coordinates: 28°40′19″N 81°20′8″W

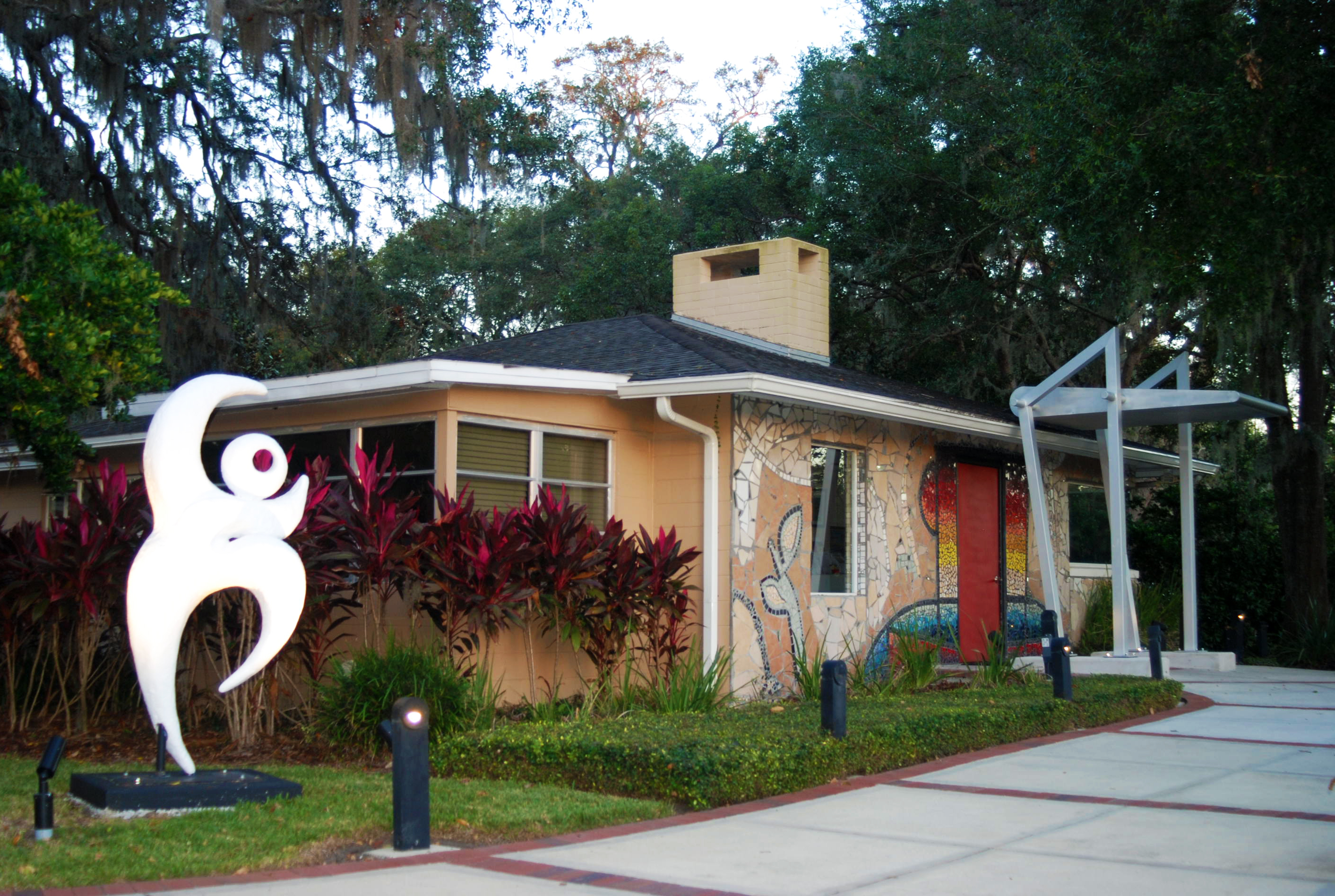
Casselberry Art House

The Casselberry Art House is an art gallery and classroom facility located in Casselberry, Florida. Adjacent to Lake Concord Park, the Art House is a 2500 square foot facility that offers monthly art exhibitions, daily art classes and educational programs, workshops, artist lectures and demonstrations, and musical performances for all ages.

The City of Casselberry acquired the building that would become the Art House in 2000. Formerly a mid-century private residence fallen into a dilapidated state, local artists, community sponsors, and the city renovated the building and the Art House opened up as an experimental art gallery to the public in 2003.

Along with quarterly art exhibits in Casselberry City Hall, and the sculpture garden in Lake Concord Park, the Art House is cited by Casselberry city leaders as integral to Casselberry’s recent makeover as a municipality friendly to the arts. The Art House serves as center to the City's annual iLLuminart sculpture event, which features temporary illuminated light installations around the Art House and Lake Concord Park.

The Orlando Sentinel and Orlando Weekly named the Art House one of the 101 things to love about Central Florida, and one of the best ways to experience Orlando's vibrant arts scene, respectively. Artist Marla E, 2016 Seminole County Artist of the Year, debuted “The Urban Plaster Experience” at the Art House while an instructor.

The Art House is also home to the Florida Sculptors Guild and the Central Florida Artist’s Way, which is based on the book The Artist's Way by Julia Cameron.
