= Dawsonville, Georgia =

- City
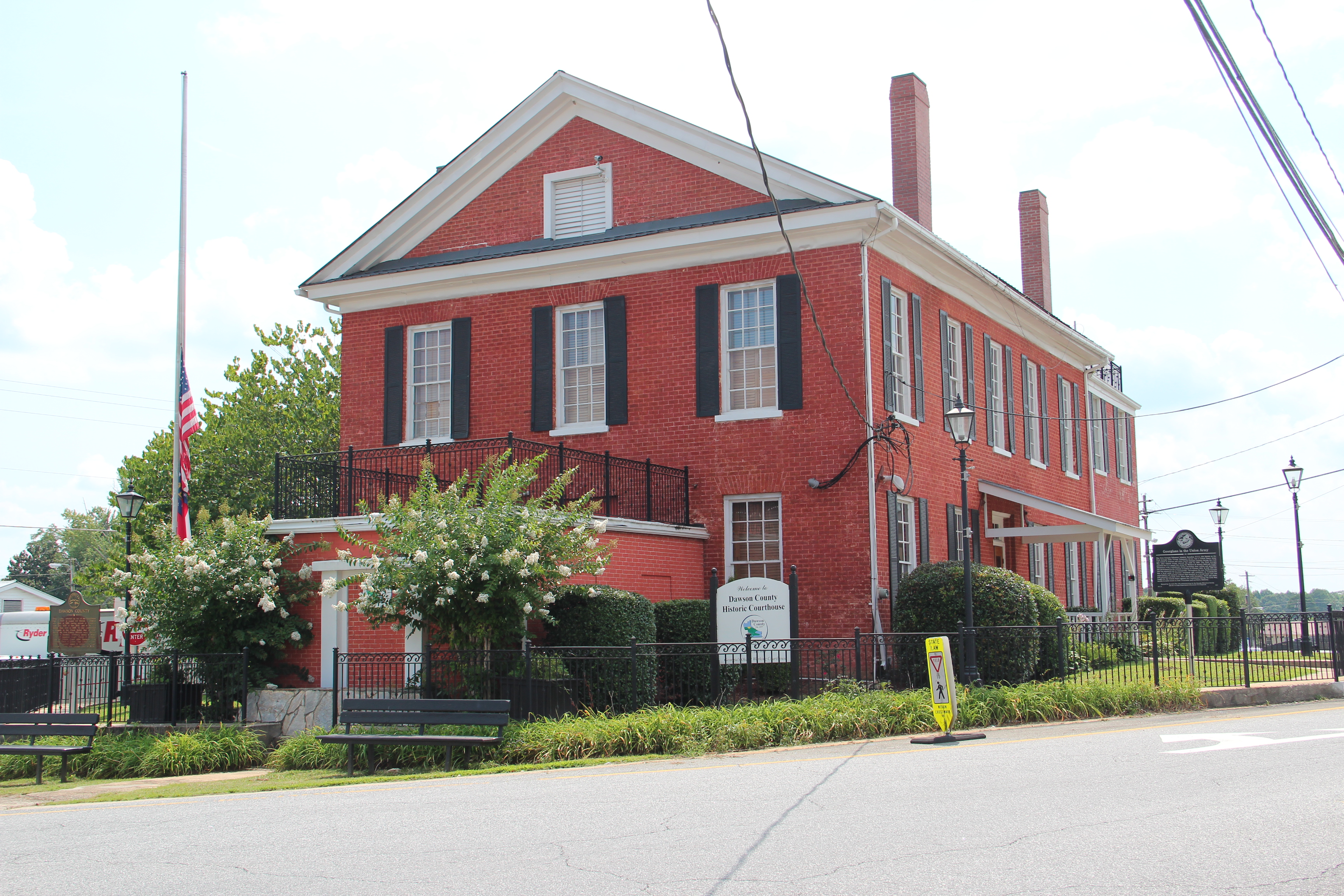
- Historic Dawson County Courthouse

- Flag Seal
- Motto(s): "Protecting our history and providing for the future"
- Location in Dawson County and the state of Georgia
- Coordinates: 34°25′N 84°7′W
- Country: United States
- State: Georgia
- County: Dawson

Government
  - Type: Mayor-council government
  - Mayor: John Walden
  - City manager: vacant

Area
  - Total: 8.61 sq mi (22.31 km^{2})
  - Land: 8.59 sq mi (22.25 km^{2})
  - Water: 0.023 sq mi (0.06 km^{2})
- Elevation: 1,365 ft (416 m)

Population (2026)
  - Total: 5,421
  - Density: 433.0/sq mi (167.19/km^{2})
- Time zone: UTC-5 (Eastern (EST))
  - Summer (DST): UTC-4 (EDT)
- ZIP code: 30534
- Area code: 706
- FIPS code: 13-21940
- GNIS feature ID: 0331529
- Website: www.dawsonville-ga.gov

Dawsonville is a city in and the county seat of Dawson County, Georgia, United States. The population was 5,421 in 2026. Dawsonville is included in the Atlanta-Sandy Springs-Roswell, GA metropolitan statistical area.

The city head is Mayor John Walden, who was sworn in on December 18, 2023.

== History ==
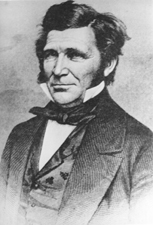
Senator William Crosby Dawson

Dawsonville was founded in 1857 as seat of the newly formed Dawson County. It was incorporated as a town in 1859 and as a city in 1952. The community and the county are named for U.S. Senator William Crosby Dawson.

== Geography ==
Dawsonville is located at 34°25′N 84°7′W.

According to the United States Census Bureau, the city has a total area of 8.2 square miles (21.3 km^{2}), of which 0.02 square miles (0.05 km^{2}), or 0.26%, is water.

The community is at the junction of State Routes 9, 53, and 136. SR 9 leads northeast 14 miles (23 km) to Dahlonega and south 17 miles (27 km) to Cumming, while SR 53 leads southeast 6 miles (10 km) to U.S. Route 19 and west 24 miles (39 km) to Jasper. SR 136 also leads to Jasper, on a 29-mile (47 km) route that runs further to the north through the southern end of the Blue Ridge Mountains.

Amicalola Falls, 15 miles (24 km) north of the center of Dawsonville, is one of the seven natural wonders of Georgia.

== Demographics ==
Historical population
Census	Pop.	Note	%±
1880	199		—
1900	217		—
1910	179		−17.5%
1920	198		10.6%
1930	203		2.5%
1940	319		57.1%
1950	318		−0.3%
1960	307		−3.5%
1970	288		−6.2%
1980	342		18.8%
1990	467		36.5%
2000	619		32.5%
2010	2,536		309.7%
2020	3,720		46.7%
2025 (est.)	4,888	▲	31.4%
U.S. Decennial Census; 2025

=== 2020 census ===
As of the 2020 census, Dawsonville had a population of 3,720. The median age was 35.6 years. 24.6% of residents were under the age of 18 and 15.1% of residents were 65 years of age or older. For every 100 females there were 93.3 males, and for every 100 females age 18 and over there were 90.1 males age 18 and over.

0.0% of residents lived in urban areas, while 100.0% lived in rural areas.

There were 1,380 households in Dawsonville, of which 36.6% had children under the age of 18 living in them. Of all households, 51.5% were married-couple households, 13.3% were households with a male householder and no spouse or partner present, and 29.2% were households with a female householder and no spouse or partner present. About 24.1% of all households were made up of individuals and 10.8% had someone living alone who was 65 years of age or older.

There were 1,449 housing units, of which 4.8% were vacant. The homeowner vacancy rate was 1.8% and the rental vacancy rate was 4.8%.

Dawsonville racial composition as of 2020
Race	Num.	Perc.
White (non-Hispanic)	3,236	86.99%
Black or African American (non-Hispanic)	29	0.78%
Native American	15	0.4%
Asian	20	0.54%
Pacific Islander	5	0.13%
Other/mixed	167	4.49%
Hispanic or Latino	248	6.67%

== Recreation ==
=== Auto racing ===
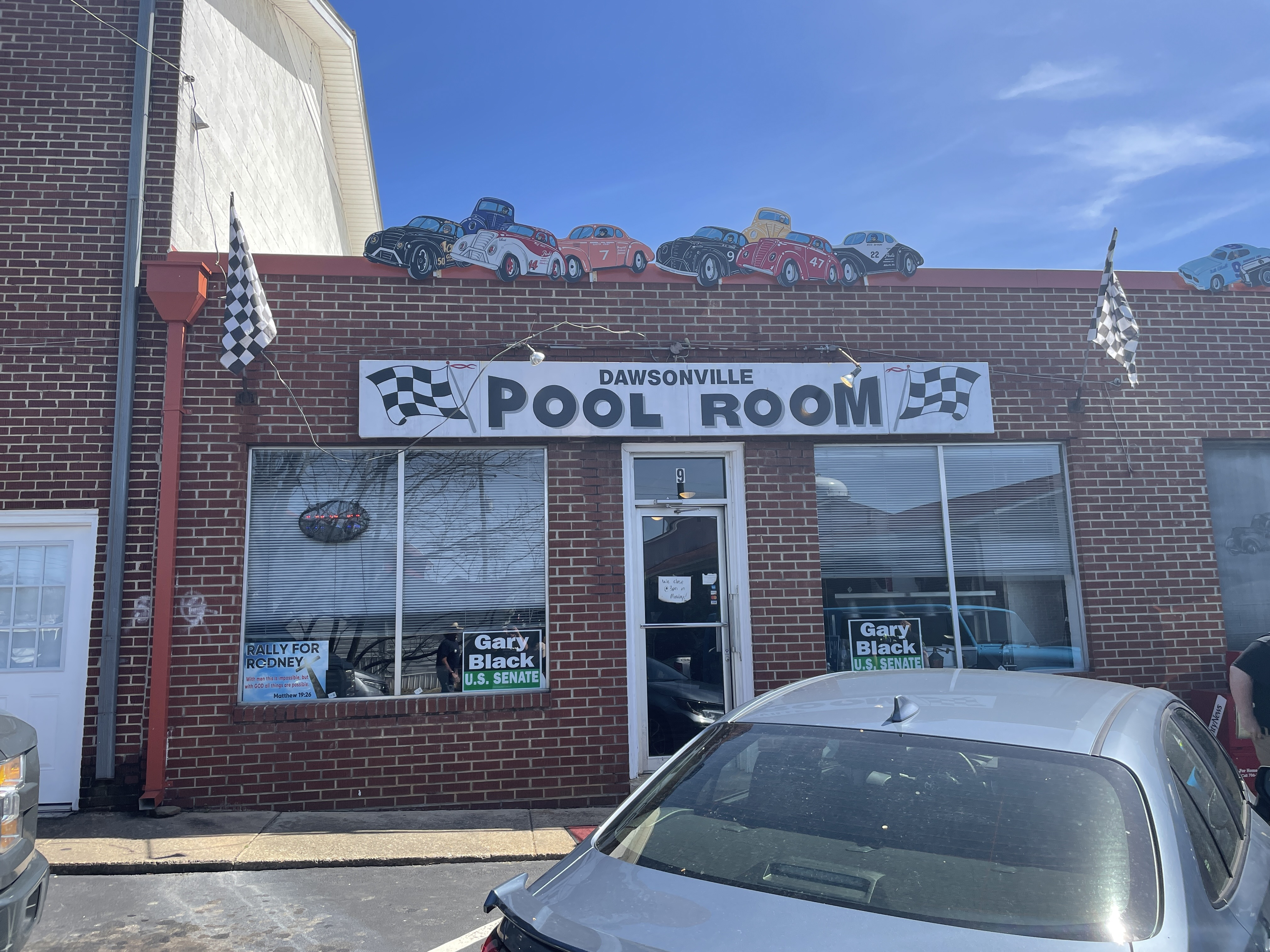
Dawsonville Pool Room

The community is known in auto racing circles for its long tradition of involvement in the sport; many racing skills originally developed as a consequence of moonshine activity in the area. Dawsonville celebrates this legacy each October with the annual "Mountain Moonshine Festival".

Dawsonville is the home of retired NASCAR driver Bill Elliott, who won the Winston Cup championship in 1988 and was inducted into the NASCAR Hall of Fame in 2015, and his son Chase Elliott, who won the 2020 NASCAR Cup Championship and who currently races in the NASCAR Cup Series. Bill Elliott's nickname is "Awesome Bill from Dawsonville". The former city hall has a racing theme as well, and serves as the location of the Georgia Racing Hall of Fame. Following a significant racing accomplishment made by Bill or Chase Elliott, such as a win, the siren on the Dawsonville Pool Room near the city square goes off to let the town know.

== Education ==
=== Dawson County School District ===
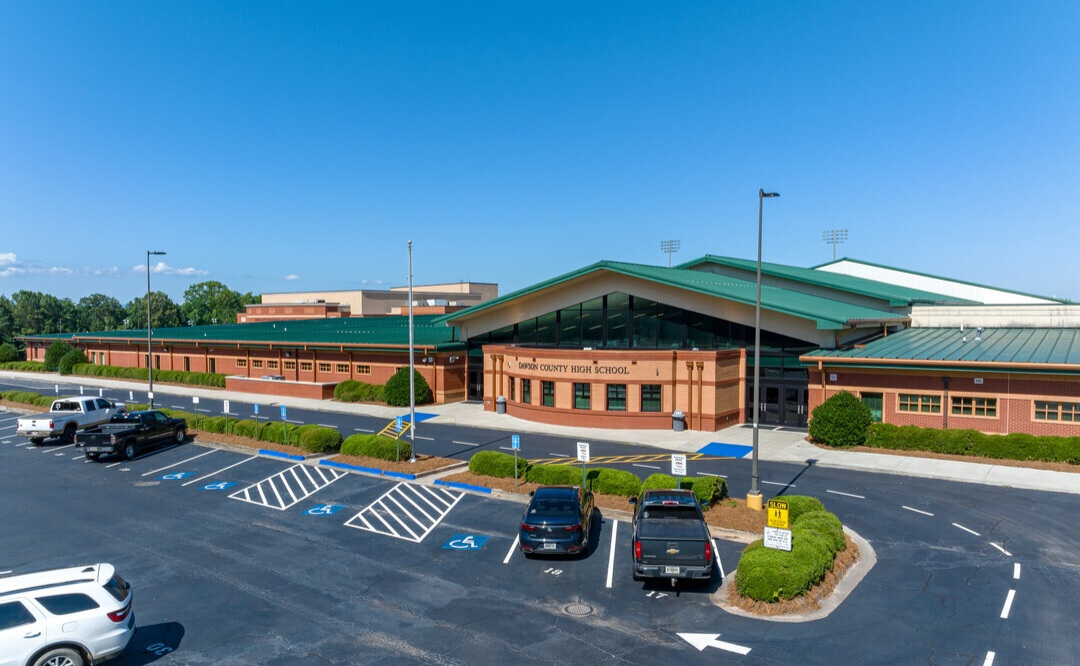
Dawson County High School

The Dawson County School District holds pre-school to grade twelve, and consists of four elementary schools, a middle school, a junior high school, and a high school.

- Black's Mill Elementary School
- Kilough Elementary School
- Robinson Elementary School
- Riverview Elementary School
- Dawson County Middle School
- Dawson County Junior High School
- Dawson County High School

The Dawson County School System is a charter system.

== Notable people ==
- Spencer Davis, stock car racing driver
- Bill Elliott, nicknamed "Awesome Bill from Dawsonville", former professional stock car racing driver and 1988 NASCAR Winston Cup Series champion
- Casey Elliott, professional stock car racing driver and nephew of Bill Elliott
- Chase Elliott, professional stock car racing driver, son of Bill Elliott, and 2020 NASCAR Cup Series champion
- Jerry Glanville, former National Football League head coach and stock car racing driver
- Bill Goldberg, professional wrestler, actor, former American football player, multiple-time world heavyweight champion in World Championship Wrestling (WCW) and WWE, and former resident of Dawsonville
- Roy Hall, moonshine runner and early stock car racing driver; cousin of Lloyd Seay
- Cone Johnson, politician
- Raymond Parks, moonshine runner and NASCAR pioneer regarded as the first organized stock car racing team owner
- Lloyd Seay, moonshine runner and early stock car racing driver; cousin of Roy Hall
- David Sosebee, race car driver
- Gober Sosebee, race car driver
