= Roy Hall (racing driver) =

American moonshiner and stock car racing driver

- Born: January 30, 1920; Dawsonville, Georgia, U.S.
- Died: March 14, 1991 (aged 71)
- Achievements: 1939, 1941, 1945 National Stock Car Champion

NASCAR Cup Series career
- 2 races run over 2 years
- Best finish: 26th (1949)
- First race: 1949 Wilkes 200 (North Wilkesboro)
- Last race: 1952 Southern 500 (Darlington)
Wins	Top tens	Poles
0	1	0

Roy Hall (January 30, 1920 – March 14, 1991), known as "Rapid Roy" and "Reckless Roy", was a pioneering American stock car racing driver, who achieved success in the early days of the sport driving cars owned by Raymond Parks and prepared by Red Vogt. Hall was also involved in the moonshine trade in north Georgia in the 1930s and 1940s and would compete in three events in the NASCAR Strictly Stock Series shortly following its formation.

== Personal life ==
Born to a poor family in Dawsonville, Georgia, Hall was described as "obscenely handsome and absurdly cocky". Hall had a theory on life: "When it's time to go, I'll go. Until then, I have nothing to lose." Hall became involved in the moonshine trade at an early age, dropping out of school at the age of ten and relocating to Atlanta with an uncle, where he assisted his cousin, Raymond Parks, in running a numbers game ("the bug") and, soon afterward, running moonshine. Rum-running would land Hall in prison repeatedly; later bank robbery would see him jailed for three years from 1946 to 1949; occasionally to escape the pursuit of the law Hall would compete in races under an assumed name.

== Racing career ==
Hall's racing skills were honed through his prowess at moonshine-running in the hills of northern Georgia; a mechanic described Hall's driving style as "...[not knowing] what a brake was". His first major stock car race was at Lakewood Speedway near Atlanta, Georgia on November 11, 1938; he was credited with a fifth-place finish. He would go on to dominate the 1939 racing season, being credited with the "national championship", which was at the time essentially an honorary title; he won races at the Daytona Beach and Road Course in 1939, then again in 1940, setting a race record speed of 76.53 mph (123.16 km/h); Hall used a unique driving style that saw Hall driving on two wheels through the course's turns. Hall would win the 1941 national stock car championship following the death of teammate Lloyd Seay, another cousin.

Following World War II, Hall returned to racing. In the first stock car race held after World War II, Hall beat Bill France Sr. to win the inaugural race at Seminole Speedway in the fall of 1945; he was declared the champion of the abbreviated 1945 stock car racing season. Hall would beat France again on the Daytona course in June 1946, leading to France choosing to retire from driving in favor of promoting races exclusively. Not long afterward, he was arrested, charged, and convicted for a $40,000 bank robbery ($660,410 adjusted for inflation) that took place near Atlanta; sentenced to six years in prison, Hall was released after three years for good behavior. Hardened by the experience, Hall returned to compete in the newly formed NASCAR Strictly Stock series at North Wilkesboro Speedway in October 1949, finishing sixth; two weeks later NASCAR Modified race at Tri-City Speedway, Hall suffered a serious accident, leaving him in the hospital for over a month.

Hall would return to the track at Darlington Raceway in 1952, driving a DeSoto in the Southern 500 and finishing forty-eighth in a field of sixty-six cars; he would drive only one further race in his career, at Lakewood Speedway in 1960, where he crashed. He then retired, becoming a car dealer in Atlanta, and died in 1991.

== Legacy ==
Through his exploits moonshining and racing, Hall became a Southern legend; in addition to being considered "one of the best early stock car racers", ballads were written about him by Blind Willie McTell and Jim Croce.

== Motorsport career results ==
=== NASCAR ===
(key) (Bold – Pole position awarded by qualifying time. Italics – Pole position earned by points standings or practice time. * – Most laps led.)

==== Grand National Series ====
NASCAR Grand National Series results
Year	Team	No.	Make	1	2	3	4	5	6	7	8	9	10	11	12	13	14	15	16	17	18	19	20	21	22	23	24	25	26	27	28	29	30	31	32	33	34	NGNC	Pts
1949	Ray Parks	14	Olds	CLT	DAB	HBO	LAN	HAM	MAR	HEI	NWS; 6																											26th	100
1952		22	DeSoto	PBS	DAB	JAC	NWS	MAR	CLB	ATL	MGR	LAN	DAR	DAY	CAN	HAY	FMS	HBO	CLT	MSF	NIF	OSW	MON	MOR	PPS	MCF	ASW	DAR; 48	MGR	LAN	DAY	WIL	HBO	MAR	NWS	ATL	PBS	165th	-

Sporting positions
Preceded by Lloyd Seay	National Stock Car Champion (Unofficial); 1939	Succeeded by Bill France Sr.
Preceded by Bill France Sr.	National Stock Car Champion (Unofficial); 1941, 1945	Succeeded by Ed Samples
