= Hibbard Casselberry =

American entrepreneur (1893–1969)

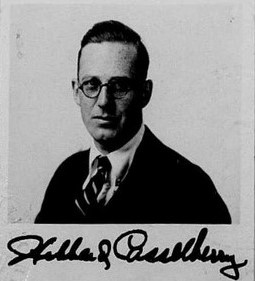
- Hibbard Casselberry US Passport Photo circa 1920
- Born: 1893; Chicago, Illinois, US
- Died: 1969 (aged 76)
- Education: Yale University
- Occupations: Entrepreneur, real estate developer, and agricultural innovator
- Known for: Founder of the city of Casselberry, Florida

Hibbard Casselberry (March 5, 1893 – August 27, 1969) was an American entrepreneur, real estate developer, and agricultural innovator, best known as the founder of the city of Casselberry, Florida. His vision for blending agricultural prosperity with residential living laid the foundation for the area's growth in the mid-20th century.

== Biography ==
Born in Chicago, Illinois, in 1893, Casselberry was the first grandson in his family after nine granddaughters, and his birth coincided with his grandmother's birthday, which was celebrated by his grandfather with a flag-raising and a gift of a $100 gold piece. His distinctive first name was the maiden name of his mother, Lillian Gold Hibbard, a hardware heiress, who was married to Dr. William Evans Casselberry, a prominent surgeon.

He attended Yale University, graduating in 1916 with a degree in mechanical engineering. Following his graduation, he served as a Navy ensign during World War I, where he served on the USS DeKalb and the USS McKean (DD-90).

In 1921, Casselberry married his first wife, Mary Elizabeth "Mel" Leonard. During a 1926 family visit in Winter Park, Florida, Leonard broke her arm, delaying their return to Illinois. With their extended stay, Casselberry became interested in the area's potential for real estate development and agriculture. He went to work as an exclusive sales agent for Gordon Barnett, who was planning Fern Park Estates just before the opening of a new highway U.S. 17-92. After splitting off with Barnett, Casselberry started his own company, Winter Park Ferneries.

Casselberry initially purchased 140 acres of fernery land near Lake Orienta, later selling it to another local family. He then acquired hundreds of acres surrounding the Triplet Chain of Lakes, where he developed Fern Park Estates. His business model targeted northern retirees, offering them a residential lot combined with a small fernery or orange grove to provide supplemental income. This innovative approach set the foundation for his broader vision of a self-sustaining community. Casselberry's early developments included "Normandy" style cottages designed by noted architect James Gamble Rogers II, which garnered national publicity. In 1940, the Florida Legislature approved a petition to incorporate the town of Casselberry. The town thrived under his leadership, initially operating without real estate taxes. Casselberry served as the town's first mayor for two terms and held a seat on the town council. Meanwhile, his agricultural enterprises focused on growing asparagus ferns, flowers, and Belgian azaleas, which were shipped across the country and Canada. However during World War II, Casselberry's fernery shipments could no longer compete with the growing demand for military supplies, so he switched to manufacturing bomb parachutes. According to family records, he was given priority to construct 23 houses for workers and a 15,000-square-foot "miracle building," so named because it was completed in just 21 days. After the war, the sewing machines kept running, but instead of parachutes, they were used to produce children's clothing and chenille bedspreads.

In 1952, Hibbard Casselberry built Brightwater, a landmark estate near South Lake Triplet, where he resided with his second wife, Martha, for the remainder of his life. Also designed by architect James Gamble Rogers II, Brightwater remains a central piece of Casselberry's historical identity.

Hibbard Casselberry died in August of 1969 at the age of 75 or 76. Casselberry City Council declared a Day of Mourning in his honor.
