= 2010 Carrera Panamericana =

The 2010 edition of the Carrera Panamericana Mexican sports car racing event started in Tuxtla Gutiérrez, Chiapas and finished in Zacatecas, Zacatecas. This edition was composed of seven stages and one day of qualification. Harri Rovanpera won this edition, in his first attempt. Jouni Närhi was his co-driver. Michel Jourdain Jr. was the runner up.

== Participants ==
There are 120 cars in 8 categories: Turismo Mayor, Turismo de Producción, Historico A, B and C, Sport Mayor, Sport Menor and Original Panam. And five in exhibition.

Harri Rovanpera (WRC), Michel Jourdain Jr. (CART), Jochen Mass (Formula One) and Jo Ramírez are outstanding drivers.

== Route ==
The 2010 edition travel through ten states: start in Chiapas and passed by Oaxaca, Puebla, Hidalgo, Querétaro, Guanajuato, Michoacán, Jalisco, Aguascalientes, and finally Zacatecas.

The 3,261 km (2,027 mi) of distance are divided in speed (582 km) and transit (2,679 km).

2010 Carrera Panamericana Route

== Results ==
=== Overall ===
Harri Rovanperä, 1st Place

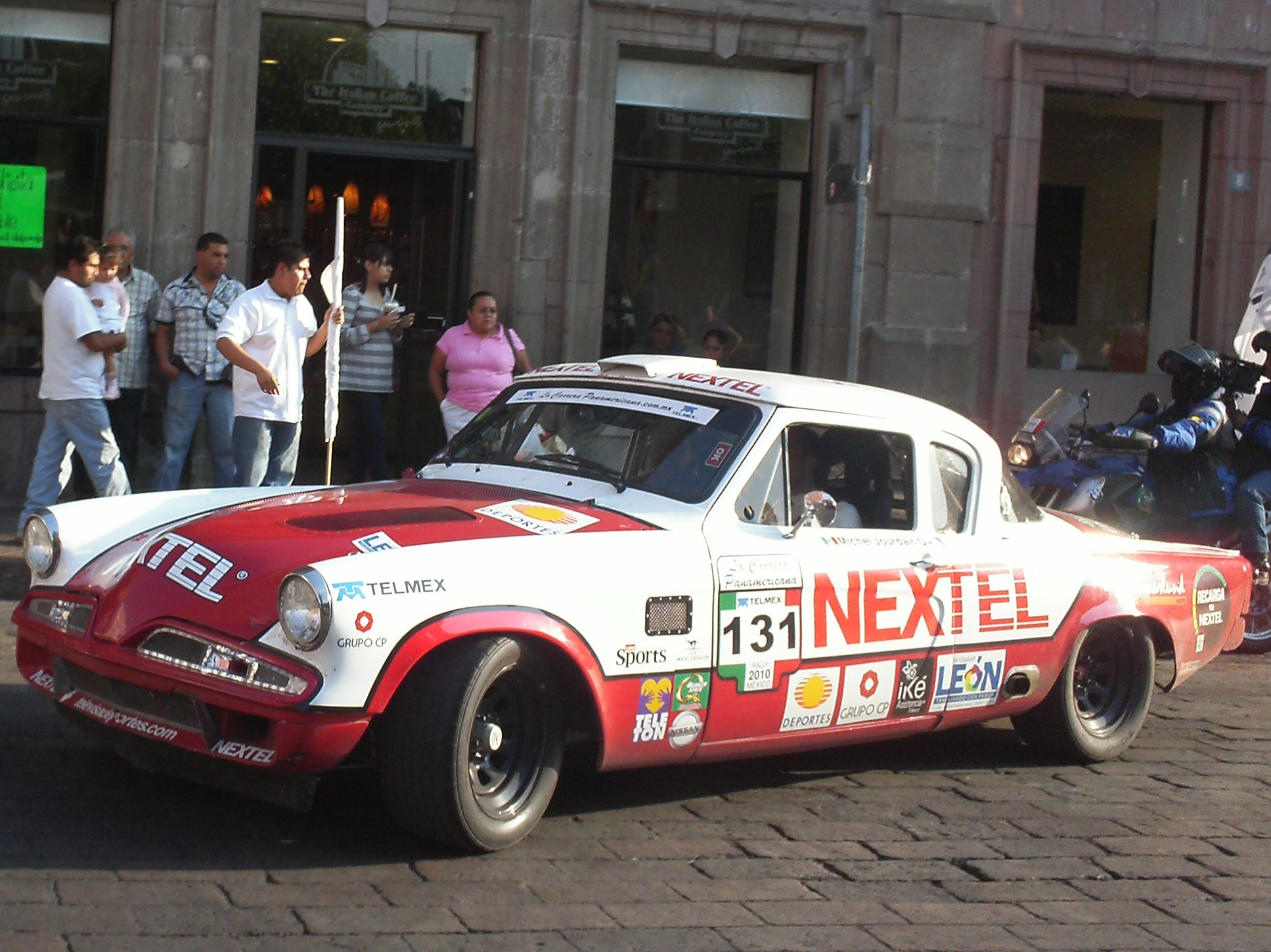
Michel Jourdain, 2nd Place

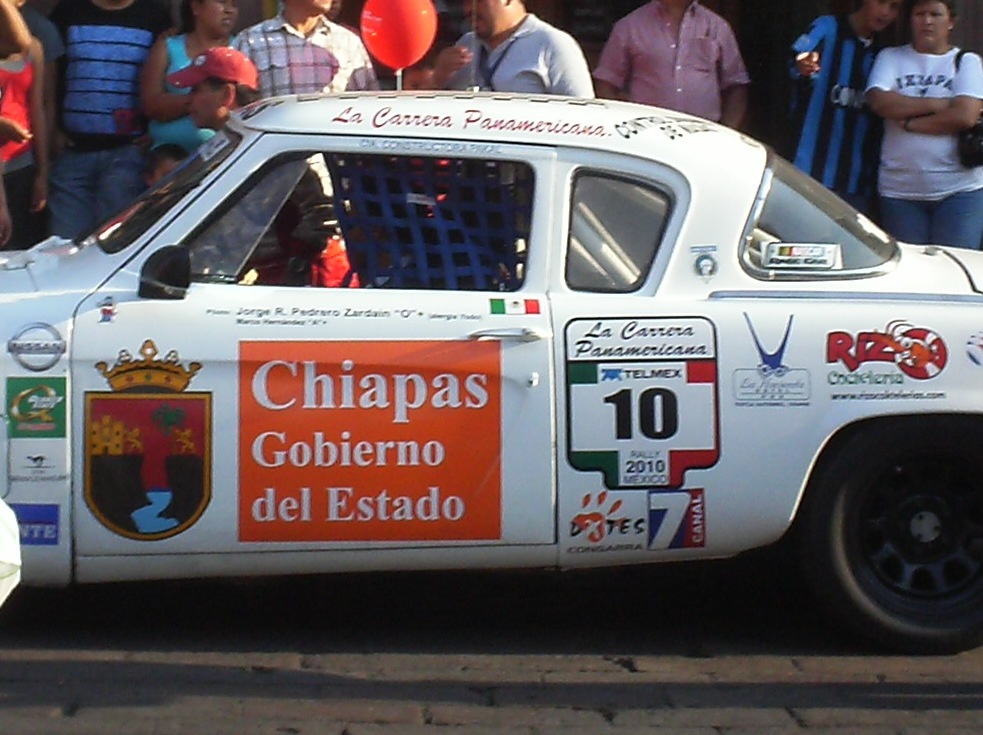
Jorge Pedrero, 3rd Place

Place	Driver	Co-driver	Car	Time
1	(Finland) Harri Rovanperä	(Finland) Jouni Närhi	Studebaker	4:10:25.7
2	(Mexico) Michel Jourdain Jr.	(Mexico) Miguel Angel Diez	Studebaker	+12.9
3	(Mexico) Jorge Pedrero	(Mexico) Marco Antonio Hernández	Studebaker	+13:14.8
4	(Belgium) Stephan Meyers	(Belgium) Albert Demey	Studebaker	+19:25.4
5	(Mexico) Francisco Márquez García	(Mexico) Araceli Ramírez Islas	Hudson	+19:53.9
6	(France) Hilaire Damiron	(Mexico) Horacio Chousal Escamilla	Buick	+20:34.7
7	(Mexico) Carlos Anaya Márquez	(Mexico) Javier Marín	LT Special	+11:46.2
8	(United States) Martin Lauber	(United States) Conrad Stevenson	Alfa Romeo	+30:09.5
9	(Mexico) David Jassan	(Mexico) Veronica Morelos	Porsche 911	+14:43.1
10	(Austria) Lars Kroiss	(Austria) Martin Rettenbacher	Volvo	+14:07.2
11	(Mexico) Tomas Lopez Rocha	(Mexico) Luis Vazquez	Ford Falcon	+34:18.9
12	(Mexico) Rodolfo Alcoses	(Mexico) Ricardo Puente	Porsche	+36:43.1
13	(United States) David Gussack	(United States) Nathaniel Mundy	Volvo	+38:12.9
14	(Belgium) Marc Devis	(Belgium) Christopher Voegelin	Studebaker	+39:02.4
15	(Mexico) Alejandro Pimentel	(Mexico) Mauricio Pimentel	Dodge	+40:23.0
16	(Canada) Stewart Robertson	(Canada) Linda Robertson	Studebaker	+41:07.2
17	(Mexico) Carlos Martínez Campos	(Mexico) Roberto Mendoza	Ford Falcon	+41:14.1
18	(Mexico) Carlos Castillo	(Mexico) Carlos Antonio Ramírez	Studebaker	+42:33.4
19	(Mexico) Emilio Azcárraga Jean	(Mexico) Andres Gomez	Porsche 911	+45:10.2
20	(Mexico) Fredy Van Beuren	(Mexico) Manuel Gilardi	Porsche 911	+45:46.7

=== By Category ===
Category	Driver	Co-driver	Car	Time
Turismo Mayor	(Finland) Harri Rovanperä	(Finland) Jouni Närhi	Studebaker	4:10:25.7
Turismo Producción	(Mexico) Jorge Pedrero	(Mexico) Marco Antonio Hernández	Studebaker	4:23.40.5
Historic A	(United States) Robert Curry	(United States) Rick Shaw	Porsche	5:44:32.5
Historic A+	(United States) Martin Lauber	(United States) Conrad Stevenson	Alfa Romeo	4:40:35.2
Historic B	(Mexico) David Jassan	(Mexico) Veronica Morelos	Porsche 911	4:44:09.8
Historic C	(Mexico) Tomas Lopez Rocha	(Mexico) Luis Vazquez Lecanda	Ford Falcon	4:44:44.6
Original Panam	(Canada) John Gregory	(Canada) Chrislana Gregory	Studebaker	5:34:17.8
Sport Mayor	(Mexico) Carlos Anaya Márquez	(Mexico) Javier Marín	LT Special	4:32:11.9
Sport Menor	(Mexico) Rodolfo Alcoses	(Mexico) Ricardo Puente	Porsche	4:47:08.8
Exhibition	(Mexico) Eduardo Henkel	(Mexico) Sergio Puente	BMW	4:30:49.9

== Stages ==
Day	Stage	Route	Driver	Co-Driver	Car	link
October 21	Qualification	Tuxtla Gutiérrez	(United States) Bill Beilharz	(Mexico) Jorge Ceballos	Studebaker	Results
October 22	Stage 1	Tuxtla Gutiérrez-Oaxaca de Juárez	(Mexico) Jorge Pedrero	(Mexico) Marco Antonio Hernández	Studebaker	Results
October 23	Stage 2	Oaxaca de Juárez-Puebla	(Finland) Harri Rovanperä	(Finland) Jouni Närhi	Studebaker	Results
October 24	Stage 3	Puebla-Santiago de Querétaro	(Finland) Harri Rovanperä	(Finland) Jouni Närhi	Studebaker	Results
October 25	Stage 4	Santiago de Querétaro-Morelia	(Finland) Harri Rovanperä	(Finland) Jouni Närhi	Studebaker	Results
October 26	Stage 5	Morelia-Guadalajara	(Mexico) Michel Jourdain Jr.	(Mexico) Miguel Angel Diez	Studebaker	Results
October 27	Stage 6	Guadalajara-Aguascalientes	(Mexico) Michel Jourdain Jr.	(Mexico) Miguel Angel Diez	Studebaker	Results
October 28	Stage 7	Aguascalientes-Zacatecas	(Mexico) Michel Jourdain Jr.	(Mexico) Miguel Angel Diez	Studebaker	Results

=== Stage 0 ===
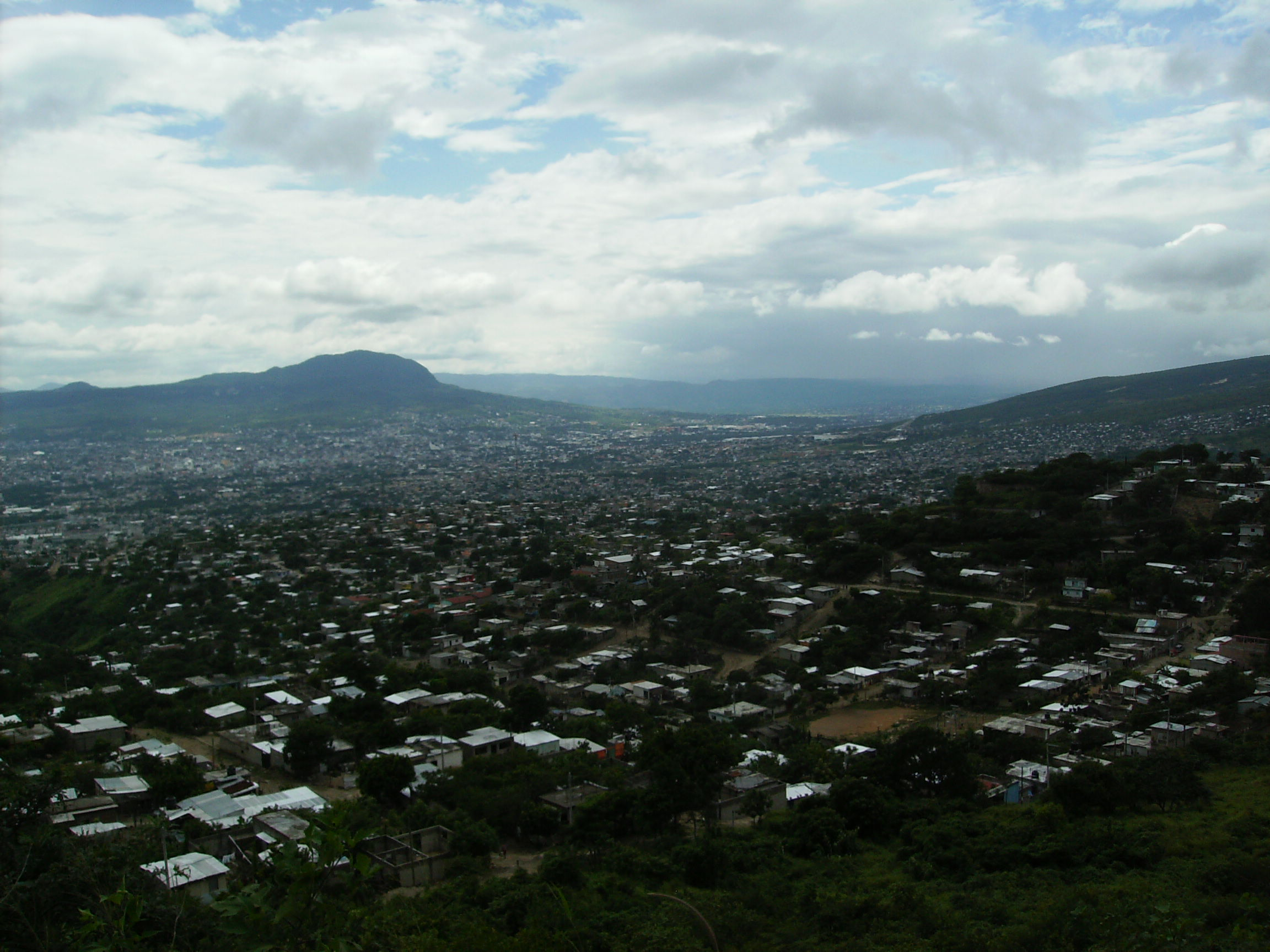
An overview of Tuxtla Gutiérrez from the hills

This stage started in the installations of Feria de Chiapas, and finished in the Autódromo de Chiapas. The distance was 7 km This stage does not count in the total time, but determined the exit order.

Results

Pos	Driver	Co-driver	Car	Category	Time	Speed
1	(United States) Bill Beilharz	(Mexico) Jorge Ceballos	Studebaker	TM	4:37.4	91.8 km/h
2	(Mexico) Michel Jourdain Jr.	(Mexico) Miguel Angel Diez	Studebaker	TM	+7.5	89.3 km/h
3	(Mexico) Alejandro Pimentel	(Mexico) Mauricio Pimentel	Dodge	TM	+9.5	88.7 km/h
4	(Mexico) Jorge Pedrero	(Mexico) Marco Antonio Hernández	Studebaker	TP	+9.9	88.6 km/h
5	(Finland) Harri Rovanperä	(Finland) Jouni Närhi	Studebaker	TM	+10.5	88.4 km/h

=== Stage 1 ===
Route of the Stage 1

The first stage was composed by 12 sections with a total of 423.88 km, but only 129.98 km were speed sections.

The route started in the main square of Tuxtla Gutiérrez, Chiapas. The race travel through Highway 190 passed by Santo Domingo Zanatepec, Santo Domingo Tehuantepec, San Pedro Tololapa, Tlacolula de Matamoros. There was a service station in Santo Domingo Tehuantepec. The stage finished in the Zocalo of Oaxaca de Juárez.

Jorge Pedrero took the leadership since the first section.

Results

Pos	Driver	Co-driver	Car	Category	Time	Speed
1	(Mexico) Jorge Pedrero	(Mexico) Marco Antonio Hernández	Studebaker	TP	57:14.2	128.8 km/h
2	(Finland) Harri Rovanperä	(Finland) Jouni Närhi	Studebaker	TM	+32.3	127.6 km/h
3	(Mexico) Michel Jourdain Jr.	(Mexico) Miguel Angel Diez	Studebaker	TM	+50.8	126.9 km/h
4	(Mexico) Carlos Anaya	(Mexico) Javier Marín	LT Special	Sport Mayor	+1:28.1	125.5 km/h
5	(Mexico) Gabriel Pérez	(Mexico) Ignacio Rodriguez	Studebaker	TM	+3:45.2	120.8 km/h

=== Stage 2 ===
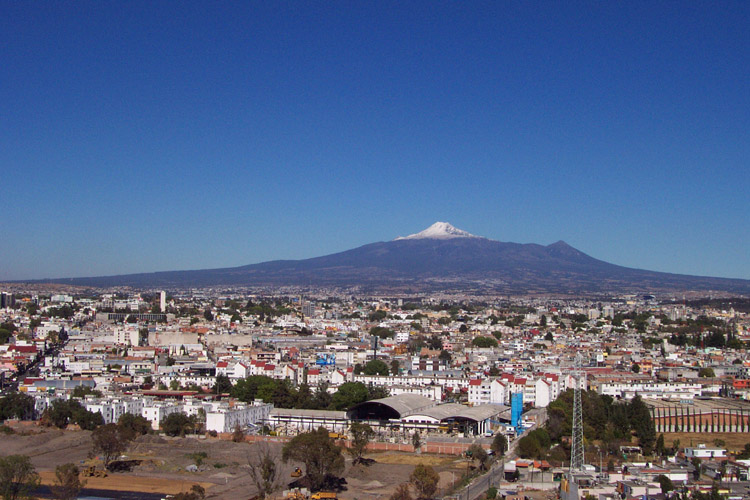
Puebla, View to the North

The second stage was composed of ten sections with a total of 371.45 km, but only 93.27 km were speed sections.

The stage started in the Zocalo of Oaxaca and continued by the Highway 190, In this occasion travel through Asunción Nochixtlán, Huajuapan de León, where took the Highway 125 to Tehuacán. Later the race travel by Highway 135 and Highway 150 to finished in the Plaza de la Concordia in Cholula. Asunción Nochixtlán served as service station.

Harri Rovanperä became the leader in the third timed segment, Oaxaca-Huajapan km 74.

Results

Pos	Driver	Co-driver	Car	Category	Time	Speed
1	(Finland) Harri Rovanperä	(Finland) Jouni Närhi	Studebaker	TM	48:24.4	115.6 km/h
2	(Mexico) Michel Jourdain Jr.	(Mexico) Miguel Angel Diez	Studebaker	TM	+6.6	115.4 km/h
3	(Mexico) Carlos Anaya	(Mexico) Javier Marín	LT Special	Sport Mayor	+8.7	115.3 km/h
4	(United States) Doug Mockett	(Mexico) Angélica Fuentes	Oldsmobile	TP	+39.8	114.0 km/h
5	(Mexico) Jorge Pedrero	(Mexico) Marco Antonio Hernández	Studebaker	TP	+56.6	113.4 km/h

Total Time

Pos	Driver	Co-driver	Car	Category	Time	Speed
1	(Finland) Harri Rovanperä	(Finland) Jouni Närhi	Studebaker	TM	1:46:10.9	122.1 km/h
2	(Mexico) Michel Jourdain Jr.	(Mexico) Miguel Angel Diez	Studebaker	TM	+24.1	121.7 km/h
3	(Mexico) Jorge Pedrero	(Mexico) Marco Antonio Hernández	Studebaker	TP	+24.3	121.6 km/h
4	(Mexico) Carlos Anaya	(Mexico) Javier Marín	LT Special	Sport Mayor	+1:04.5	120.9 km/h
5	(Mexico) Gabriel Pérez	(Mexico) Ignacio Rodriguez	Studebaker	TM	+6:15.5	115.3 km/h

=== Stage 3 ===
The third stage was the longest and was composed by 13 sections with a total of 607.77 km. 90.02 km were speed sections.

The stage started in the hotel Camino Real Angelópolis, and went to San Martín Texmelucán through Highway 150. Later took the Highway 57 and the Highway 85 to reach Pachuca. The race return to Highway 57 to go San Juan del Río. Highway 120 was taken to go Ezequiel Montes where was service station. Finally the state road 100 carried the cars to Santiago de Querétaro where the finish line was installed in the Jardín Zenea.

Pos	Driver	Co-driver	Car	Category	Time	Speed
1	(Finland) Harri Rovanperä	(Finland) Jouni Närhi	Studebaker	TM	34:47.2	
2	(Mexico) Michel Jourdain Jr.	(Mexico) Miguel Angel Diez	Studebaker	TM	+10.8	
3	(United States) Doug Mockett	(Mexico) Angélica Fuentes	Oldsmobile	TP	+1:21.8	
4	(Belgium) Marc Devis	(Belgium) Christopher Voegelin Diener	Studebaker	TM	+2:01.8	
5	(Mexico) Jorge Pedrero	(Mexico) Marco Antonio Hernández	Studebaker	TP	+2:08.8	

Total Time

Pos	Driver	Co-driver	Car	Category	Time	Speed
1	(Finland) Harri Rovanperä	(Finland) Jouni Närhi	Studebaker	TM	2:20:58.1	
2	(Mexico) Michel Jourdain Jr.	(Mexico) Miguel Angel Diez	Studebaker	TM	+34.9	
3	(Mexico) Jorge Pedrero	(Mexico) Marco Antonio Hernández	Studebaker	TP	+2:33.1	
4	(Belgium) Stephan Meyers	(Belgium) Albert Demey	Studebaker	TM	+9:23.7	
5	(France) Hilaire Damiron	(Mexico) Horacio Chousal Escamilla	Buick	TM	+9:35.9	

=== Stage 4 ===
The stage 4 began in the Auditorio Josefa Ortíz en Santiago de Querétaro continued to Corregidora, and returned to the north of the city. Later took the route 57 towards Huimilpan in Amealco de Bonfil Municipality. The race entered to Guanajuato by the municipality of Jerécuaro and passed throw Apaseo el alto, Tarimoro, Acámbaro. In Michoacán travels by Zinapécuaro and finished in Morelia. The total distance was 434 km. in eleven sections. 81 km were in speed seccions.

Pos	Driver	Co-driver	Car	Category	Time	Speed
1	(Finland) Harri Rovanperä	(Finland) Jouni Närhi	Studebaker	TM	33:21.0	147.09
2	(Mexico) Michel Jourdain Jr.	(Mexico) Miguel Angel Diez	Studebaker	TM	+2.0	146.94
3	(United States) Doug Mockett	(Mexico) Angélica Fuentes	Oldsmobile	TP	+55.0	143.16
4	(Mexico) Carlos Anaya	(Mexico) Javier Marín	LT Special	SM	+1:14.0	141.85
5	(Belgium) Stephan Meyers	(Belgium) Albert Demey	Studebaker	TM	+1:29.0	140.83

Total Time

Pos	Driver	Co-driver	Car	Category	Time	Speed
1	(Finland) Harri Rovanperä	(Finland) Jouni Närhi	Studebaker	TM	2:54:19.1	
2	(Mexico) Michel Jourdain Jr.	(Mexico) Miguel Angel Diez	Studebaker	TM	+36.9	
3	(Mexico) Jorge Pedrero	(Mexico) Marco Antonio Hernández	Studebaker	TP	+4:11.1	
4	(Belgium) Stephan Meyers	(Belgium) Albert Demey	Studebaker	TM	+10:52.7	
5	(France) Hilaire Damiron	(Mexico) Horacio Chousal Escamilla	Buick	TM	+12:09.9	

=== Stage 5 ===
Total Time

Pos	Driver	Co-driver	Car	Category	Time	Speed
1	(Finland) Harri Rovanperä	(Finland) Jouni Närhi	Studebaker	TM	3:13:21.3	
2	(Mexico) Michel Jourdain Jr.	(Mexico) Miguel Angel Diez	Studebaker	TM	+29.5	
3	(Mexico) Jorge Pedrero	(Mexico) Marco Antonio Hernández	Studebaker	TP	+7:45.9	
4	(Belgium) Stephan Meyers	(Belgium) Albert Demey	Studebaker	TM	+12:03.9	
5	(Mexico) Gabriel Pérez	(Mexico) Ignacio Rodriguez	Studebaker	TM	+13:56.7	

=== Stage 6 ===
Pos	Driver	Co-driver	Car	Category	Time	Speed
1	(Mexico) Michel Jourdain Jr.	(Mexico) Miguel Angel Diez	Studebaker	TM	24:05.0	
2	(Finland) Harri Rovanperä	(Finland) Jouni Närhi	Studebaker	TM	+7.0	
3	(Mexico) Carlos Anaya	(Mexico) Javier Marín	LT Special	SM	+41.0	
4	(Mexico) Jorge Pedrero	(Mexico) Marco Antonio Hernández	Studebaker	TP	+1:45.0	
5	(Mexico) Alejandro Pimentel	(Mexico) Mauricio Pimentel	Dodge	TP	+1:51.0	

Total Time

Pos	Driver	Co-driver	Car	Category	Time	Speed
1	(Finland) Harri Rovanperä	(Finland) Jouni Närhi	Studebaker	TM	3:37:33.3	
2	(Mexico) Michel Jourdain Jr.	(Mexico) Miguel Angel Diez	Studebaker	TM	+22.5	
3	(Mexico) Jorge Pedrero	(Mexico) Marco Antonio Hernández	Studebaker	TP	+9:23.9	
4	(Belgium) Stephan Meyers	(Belgium) Albert Demey	Studebaker	TM	+15:30.9	
5	(France) Hilaire Damiron	(Mexico) Horacio Chousal Escamilla	Buick	TM	+16:24.9	

=== Stage 7 ===
The last and shortest stage have 296 km divided in 11 stages.

Pos	Driver	Co-driver	Car	Category	Time	Speed
1	(Mexico) Michel Jourdain Jr.	(Mexico) Miguel Angel Diez	Studebaker	TM	32:42.8	
2	(Finland) Harri Rovanperä	(Finland) Jouni Närhi	Studebaker	TM	+6.3	
3	(Mexico) Carlos Anaya	(Mexico) Javier Marín	LT Special	SM	+1:17.7	
4	(United States) Doug Mockett	(Mexico) Angélica Fuentes	Oldsmobile	TP	+1:26.7	
5	(Mexico) Alejandro Pimentel	(Mexico) Mauricio Pimentel	Dodge	TP	+1:31.2	
