= Casselberry, Florida =

City in Florida, United States

- City
- City of Casselberry
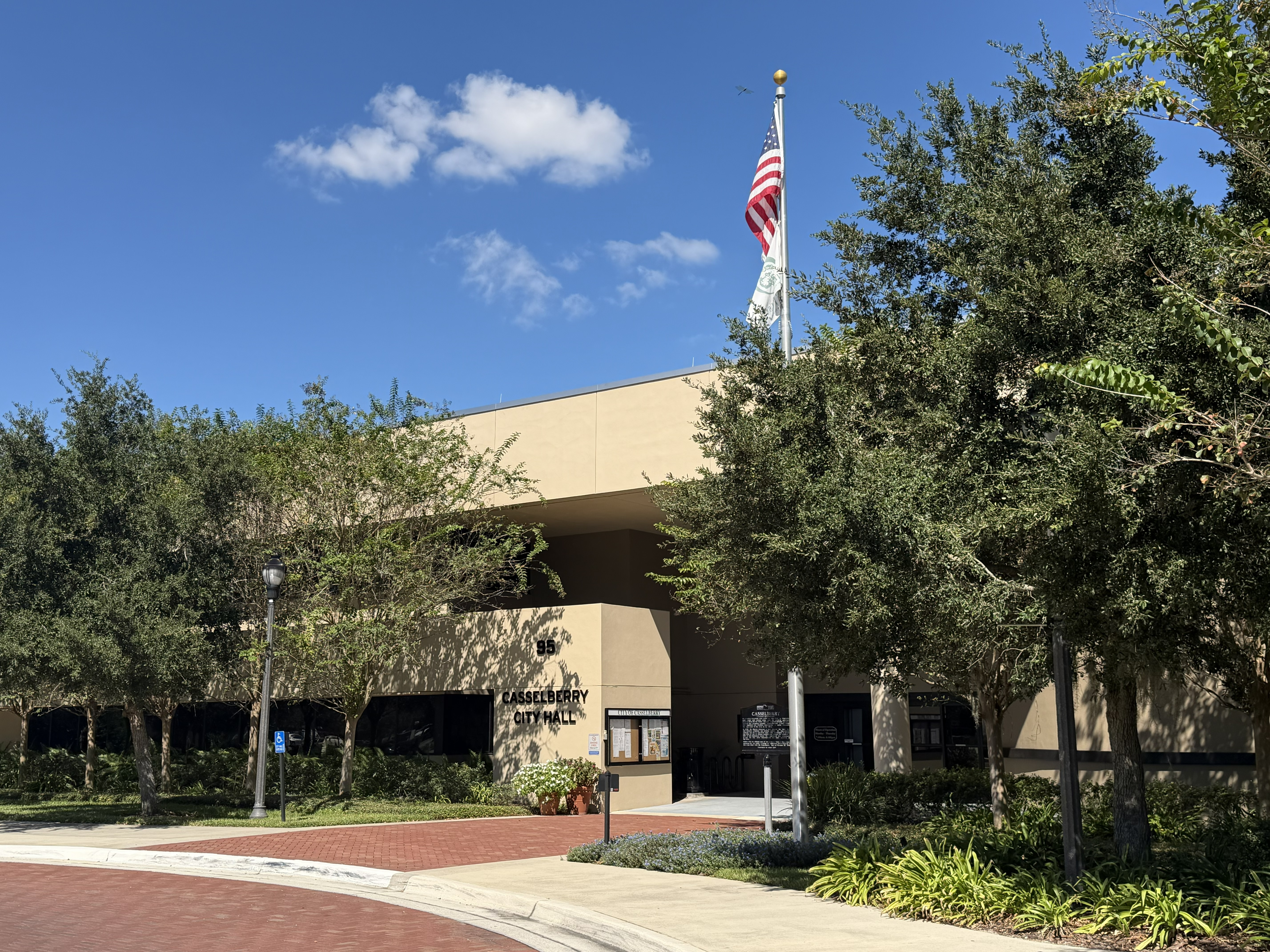
- Casselberry City Hall

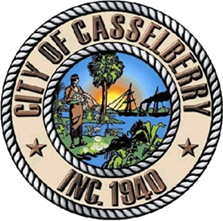
- Seal
- Motto: "The Community-Minded City"
- Location in Seminole County and the state of Florida

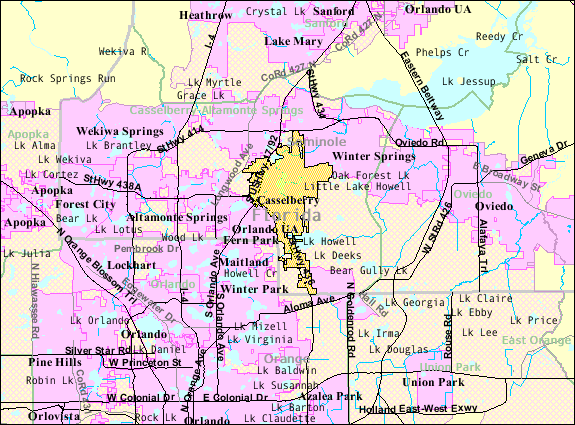
- U.S. Census Map
- Coordinates: 28°39′40″N 81°19′19″W
- Country: United States
- State: Florida
- County: Seminole
- Incorporated (town): October 10th, 1940
- Incorporated (city): July 25th, 1965

Government
  - Type: Commission–Manager

Area
  - Total: 7.51 sq mi (19.46 km^{2})
  - Land: 6.97 sq mi (18.05 km^{2})
  - Water: 0.54 sq mi (1.41 km^{2})
- Elevation: 49 ft (15 m)

Population (2020)
  - Total: 28,794
  - Density: 4,132.0/sq mi (1,595.36/km^{2})
- Time zone: UTC-5 (EST)
  - Summer (DST): UTC-4 (EDT)
- ZIP code: 32707
- Area codes: 321, 407, 689
- FIPS code: 12-11050
- GNIS feature ID: 2404005
- Website: www.casselberry.org

Casselberry is a city in Seminole County, Florida, United States. The city is part of the Orlando–Kissimmee–Sanford Metropolitan Statistical Area. Its population was 28,794 at the 2020 census.

Casselberry is 10 miles north of downtown Orlando, Florida.

== Geography ==
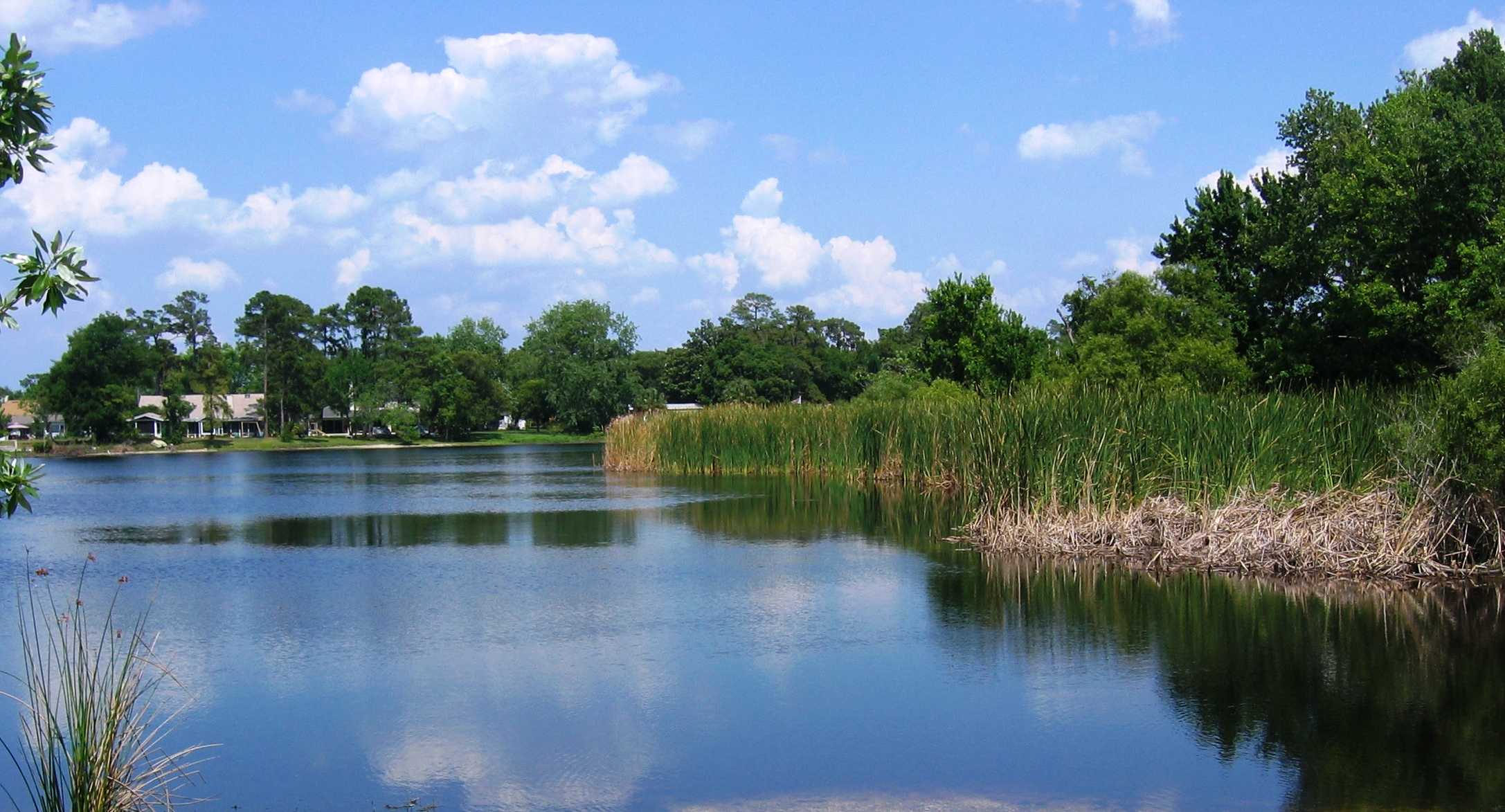
North Triplet Lake in Casselberry, Florida

According to the United States Census Bureau, the city has a total area of 7.1 square miles (18 km^{2}), of which 6.7 square miles (17 km^{2}) is land and 0.4 square miles (1.0 km^{2}) (6.06%) is water.

Casselberry features over 30 lakes and ponds, most notably Lake Howell, the largest, as well as the Triplet Chain of Lakes, Lake Kathryn, and Lake Concord.

Casselberry is connected to the rest of central Florida through major roads including U.S. Route 17-92, State Route 436, and Interstate 4.

=== Climate ===
The climate in this area is characterized by hot, humid summers and generally mild winters. According to the Köppen climate classification, the City of Casselberry has a humid subtropical climate zone (Cfa).

== History ==
Prior to European settlement in the 19th-century, Native American groups inhabited the Seminole County area, including land in present-day Casselberry.

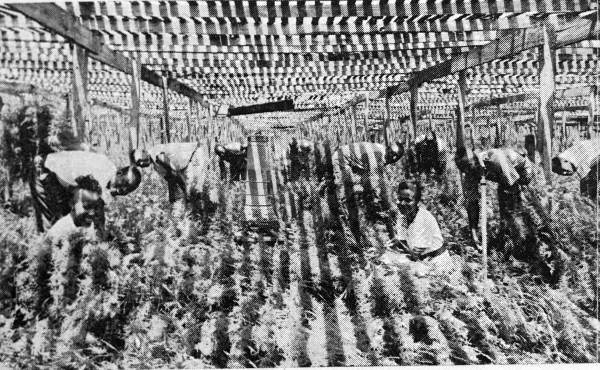
Workers picking ferns in the early 1950s.

Casselberry was originally part of the unincorporated community and current census-designated place, Fern Park.

Hibbard Casselberry initially purchased 140 acres of fernery land near Lake Orienta, later selling it to another local family. He then acquired hundreds of acres surrounding the Triplet Chain of Lakes, where he developed Fern Park Estates. In 1940, the Florida Legislature approved a petition to incorporate the town of Casselberry. The town thrived under his leadership, initially operating without real estate taxes. Casselberry served as the town's first mayor for two terms and held a seat on the town council.

On October 10, 1940, residents voted to officially incorporate the town as a tax-free community known as the "Town of Casselberry" to avoid paying property taxes.

On July 25, 1965, the town was officially reincorporated as the "City of Casselberry", and in 1976, Casselberry citizens voted to have property taxes reinstated.

In the months of July, August, and September of 2025, the city published a 'Quarterly Newsletter' which included information about the state of the sity, local events, and cultural topics. Since then, no more features of the Quarterly Newsletter have been published, although the originals have been archived.

== Demographics ==
Historical population
| Census | Pop. | Note | %± |
|---|---|---|---|
| 1950 | 407 | | — |
| 1960 | 2,463 | | 505.2% |
| 1970 | 9,438 | | 283.2% |
| 1980 | 15,037 | | 59.3% |
| 1990 | 18,911 | | 25.8% |
| 2000 | 22,629 | | 19.7% |
| 2010 | 26,241 | | 16.0% |
| 2020 | 28,794 | | 9.7% |
U.S. Decennial Census

=== Racial and ethnic composition ===
Casselberry city, Florida – Racial and ethnic composition Note: the US Census treats Hispanic/Latino as an ethnic category. This table excludes Latinos from the racial categories and assigns them to a separate category. Hispanics/Latinos may be of any race.
| Race / Ethnicity (NH = Non-Hispanic) | Pop 2000 | Pop 2010 | Pop 2020 | % 2000 | % 2010 | % 2020 |
|---|---|---|---|---|---|---|
| White alone (NH) | 17,145 | 17,023 | 15,188 | 75.77% | 64.87% | 52.75% |
| Black or African American alone (NH) | 1,137 | 1,843 | 2,660 | 5.02% | 7.02% | 9.24% |
| Native American or Alaska Native alone (NH) | 50 | 78 | 46 | 0.22% | 0.30% | 0.16% |
| Asian alone (NH) | 427 | 758 | 913 | 1.89% | 2.89% | 3.17% |
| Native Hawaiian or Pacific Islander alone (NH) | 9 | 21 | 13 | 0.04% | 0.08% | 0.05% |
| Other race alone (NH) | 70 | 58 | 166 | 0.31% | 0.22% | 0.58% |
| Mixed race or Multiracial (NH) | 367 | 537 | 1,209 | 1.62% | 2.05% | 4.20% |
| Hispanic or Latino (any race) | 3,424 | 5,923 | 8,599 | 15.13% | 22.57% | 29.86% |
| Total | 22,629 | 26,241 | 28,794 | 100.00% | 100.00% | 100.00% |

=== 2020 census ===
As of the 2020 census, Casselberry had a population of 28,794. The median age was 38.4 years. 18.6% of residents were under the age of 18 and 17.1% of residents were 65 years of age or older. For every 100 females there were 90.5 males, and for every 100 females age 18 and over there were 87.6 males age 18 and over.

100.0% of residents lived in urban areas, while 0.0% lived in rural areas.

There were 12,349 households in Casselberry, of which 25.6% had children under the age of 18 living in them. Of all households, 34.7% were married-couple households, 21.3% were households with a male householder and no spouse or partner present, and 34.6% were households with a female householder and no spouse or partner present. About 31.5% of all households were made up of individuals and 11.7% had someone living alone who was 65 years of age or older. Of these households, 6,729 were family households.

There were 13,038 housing units, of which 5.3% were vacant. The homeowner vacancy rate was 1.3% and the rental vacancy rate was 5.7%.

Racial composition as of the 2020 census
| Race | Number | Percent |
|---|---|---|
| White | 17,254 | 59.9% |
| Black or African American | 2,933 | 10.2% |
| American Indian and Alaska Native | 112 | 0.4% |
| Asian | 948 | 3.3% |
| Native Hawaiian and Other Pacific Islander | 22 | 0.1% |
| Some other race | 2,682 | 9.3% |
| Two or more races | 4,843 | 16.8% |

=== 2010 census ===
As of the 2010 United States census, there were 26,241 people, 11,109 households, and 6,334 families residing in the city.

At the 2010 U.S. census, the population density was 3,751.9 inhabitants per square mile (1,448.6/km^{2}). There were 12,708 housing units.

In 2010, there were 11,430 households, out of which 23.1% had children under the age of 18 living with them, 35.8% were married couples living together, 14.8% had a female householder with no husband present, and 44.0% were non-families. 32.5% of all households were made up of individuals, and 10.1% had someone living alone who was 65 years of age or older. The average household size was 2.29 and the average family size was 2.92.

In 2010, the median income for a household in the city was $44,807, and the median income for a family was $51,371. The per capita income for the city was $24,184. About 14.7% of the population were below the poverty line.

== Education ==
Casselberry is served by Seminole County Public Schools, with public schools located within its city limits.

=== Public elementary schools ===
- Casselberry Elementary School
- Red Bug Elementary School
- Sterling Park Elementary School

=== Middle School ===
- South Seminole Academy of Career Exploration (6–8)

=== Private schools ===
- The Geneva School

== Parks and recreation ==
The City of Casselberry maintains 17 parks ranging from small neighborhood parks to large centers for recreation, including:

- Branch Tree Park
- Crystal Bowl Park
- Dew Drop Park
- Forest Brook Park
- Lake Concord Park (and Casselberry Art House)
- Lake Hodge Park
- Lancelot Park
- Pawmosa Dog Park
- Plumosa Oaks Park
- Red Bug Lake Park
- Rotary Park
- Secret Lake Park
- Sunnytown Park
- Sunset Park
- Veterans Memorial Park
- Wirz Park
- Wirz Trail

In 2017, the city of Casselberry adopted Parks Master Plan calls for the development of a skatepark. The development of a community skatepark has been advocated for by citizens of the city for over two years through a grassroots campaign.

== Sports ==
Seminole Speedway was a racetrack located in Casselberry, operating between 1945 and 1954, and hosted stock car racing, modified stock car racing, and motorcycle racing.

== Notable people ==
- Jimmy Boyle (born 1967), record producer and musician
- Nick Calathes (born 1989), basketball player for the Memphis Grizzlies and Turkish club Fenerbahce
- Pat Calathes (born 1985), basketball player for the Israeli club Maccabi Haifa and Greek club Panathinaikos
- Hedy Lamarr (1914–2000), Austrian-born actress and inventor
- Robert James Miller (1983–2008), Medal of Honor recipient buried at All Faiths Memorial Park
- Chandler Parsons (born 1988), former NBA basketball player for the Atlanta Hawks
- Kirsten Storms (born 1984), actress, lived in Casselberry during her childhood
