= Dawson County School District =

School district in Georgia (U.S. state)

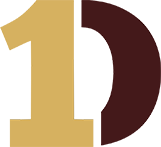
- "One Dawson" logo

Address
- 517 Allen Street Dawsonville, Georgia, 30534-4317; United States
- Coordinates: 34.419307°N 84.108889°W

District information
- Grades: Pre-K - 12
- Superintendent: Nicole LeCave
- Accreditation(s): Southern Association of Colleges and Schools; Georgia Accrediting Commission

Students and staff
- Enrollment: 3,036
- Faculty: 219

Other information
- Telephone: (706) 265-3246
- Fax: (706) 265-1226
- Website: www.dawsoncountyschools.org

The Dawson County School District is a public school district in Dawson County, Georgia, United States. It is based in Dawsonville, and serves the communities of Dawsonville, Juno, and parts of Big Canoe.

== Schools ==
The Dawson County School District contains four elementary schools, two middle schools, one high school, and one academy.

=== Academies ===
- Hightower Academy

=== Elementary schools ===
- Black's Mill Elementary School
- Kilough Elementary School
- Robinson Elementary School
- Riverview Elementary School

=== Middle schools ===
- Dawson County Middle School
- Dawson County Junior High School

=== High school ===
- Dawson County High School
