= Lloyd Seay =

American stock car racing driver (1919–1941)

- Nationality: United States
- Born: Carl D. Lloyd Seay; December 14, 1919
- Died: September 2, 1941 (aged 21)
- Relatives: Roy Hall (cousin)

Awards
- 2002 Georgia Racing Hall of Fame Inductee.

Carl D. "Lightning" Lloyd Seay (December 14, 1919 – September 2, 1941) was an early stock car racing driver from Dawsonville Georgia. NASCAR founder Bill France Sr. described Seay as the "best pure race driver I ever saw". He was shot to death by his cousin Woodrow Anderson over a moonshine operation. His last name was pronounced as "See".

Seay came from a racing family. His cousin Roy Hall was a racer who was the subject of the Jim Croce song "Rapid Roy, that Stock Car Boy". Another cousin, Raymond Parks, was the owner of NASCAR's first Strictly Stock Series championship car.

== Moonshine runner ==
A Georgia deputy described Seay as "without a doubt the best automobile driver of this time" ... "He was absolutely fearless, and an excellent driver on those dusty, dirt roads. I caught him eight times and had to shoot his tires off every time." A different deputy described another night when he pulled Seay over for speeding as he was transporting a load of moonshine through a city north of Atlanta. After he gave the deputy two five dollar bills, the officer said, "Dammit Lloyd, you know the fine for speedin' ain't but five dollars" Seay replied, "Yeah, but I'm gon' be in a hurry comin' back, so I'm payin' an advance."

== Racing career ==
Seay began racing in 1938, winning in his first stock car race at Lakewood Speedway driving a 1934 Ford owned by his cousin Raymond Parks and tuned by Red Vogt when he was 18 years old. On November 21, 1938, Seay won a 150-mile darkness shortened national championship stock car race at Lakewood.

Seay flipped his car twice during the July 27, 1941 race at the Daytona Beach Road Course and finished fourth. He returned to the track later that year on August 24, 1941 against his cousin Roy Hall in Parks' cars. After starting fifteenth, he led all 50 laps in the race. He won his next race on August 31 at High Point, and left immediately for the Labor Day race at Lakewood Speedway on the following day. He arrived late at the event, missing qualifying. He had to start last, and he passed into the lead on lap 35. He battled Bob Flock all afternoon before winning the $450 race. It was his last race. He had won three races in 15 days.

== Death ==
After winning the Lakewood race, Seay drove to his brother Jim's house in Burlsboro, Georgia to sleep overnight. The next morning, their cousin Woodrow Anderson came to the house to settle a dispute over sugar that Seay had charged to Woodrow's account. Lloyd, Jim, and Woodrow went to Woodrow's father's house to settle the dispute, and Lloyd was shot by Woodrow Anderson. He was buried in Dawsonville Cemetery. The November 2, 1941 race at Lakewood Speedway was dedicated to Seay.

== Awards ==
Carl D. "Lightning" Lloyd Seay was one of eight drivers inducted in the first class of the Georgia Racing Hall of Fame in 2002, along with Bill Elliott, Tim Flock, Red Byron, and Seay's cousins Parks and Hall.

Sporting positions
Preceded by None	National Stock Car Champion (Unofficial); 1938	Succeeded by Roy Hall
