= Dawson County High School (Dawsonville, Georgia) =

Public high school located in Dawsonville, Georgia

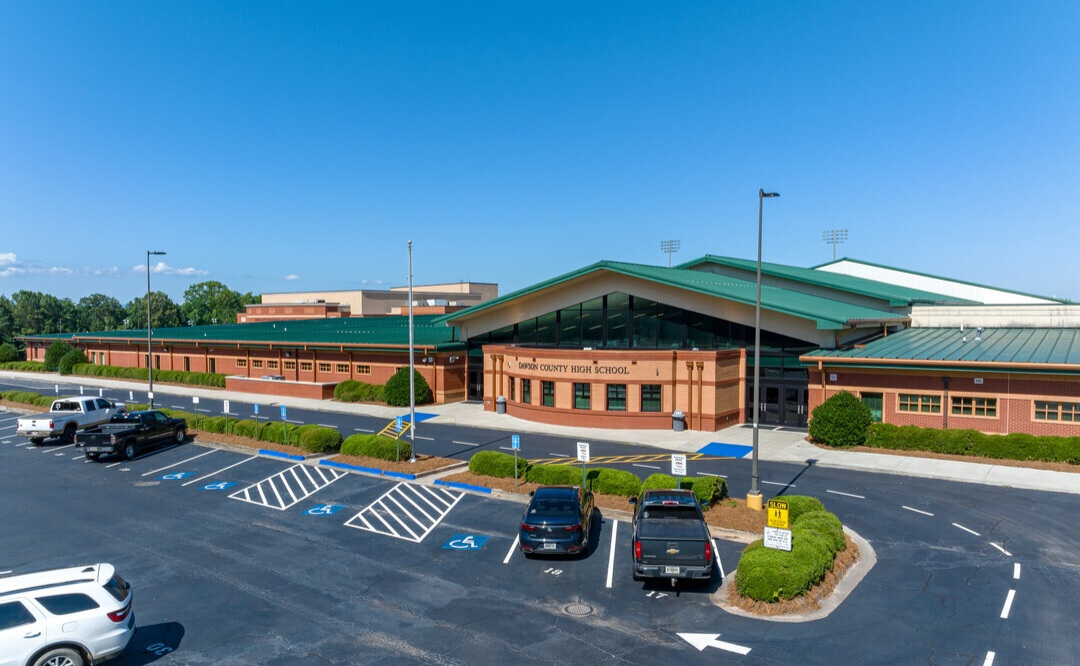

Location
- 1665 Perimeter Road; Dawsonville, Georgia 30534-4328; United States
- Coordinates: 34°24′51″N 84°6′11″W

Information
- Former name: Dawsonville High School
- School type: Public
- School district: Dawson County School District
- Principal: Michael Negley
- Teaching staff: 56.70 (on an FTE basis)
- Grades: 10-12
- Enrollment: 880 (2024-2025)
- Student to teacher ratio: 15.52
- Colors: Maroon and gold
- Team name: Tigers
- Telephone: (706) 265-6555
- Fax: (706) 265-3936
- Website: Dawson County High School

Dawson County High School is an American public high school located in Dawsonville, Georgia.

It enrolls approximately 800-900 students in grades 10, 11, and 12 annually. In the 2017–2018 school year, the school began serving only grades 10–12, with grade 9 moving to the Dawson County Junior High School.

DCHS students and staff moved into the present facility (145,000 square foot, situated on 60 acres) in December 1997. Health and medical instructional facilities, as well as 12 new classrooms (10,000 square feet) were added in August 2004. In 2016, the school added a $13 million "Performing Arts Center". A $1 million JROTC building was constructed in 2018. A "College and Career Academy" facility was built in 2019.

The principal is Michael Negley. The school employs a full-time school nurse and a school resource officer (SRO). More than 60 percent of the school's staff hold a master's degree or higher. Currently, there are over 70 certified personnel on staff at DCHS.

== Extracurriculars ==
The school's teams compete as the Tigers. Sports at Dawson County High include softball, football, flag football, soccer, cross-country, swimming, tennis, wrestling, track, JROTC Raiders, and basketball.

The school also has a fine arts program, including band, drama, chorus, and art classes. Extracurricular programs within these classes include the Dawson County Tiger Pride Marching Band and the Chamber Singers.

== Notable alumnus ==
Will Wade, member of the Georgia House of Representatives.
