= Raymond Parks (auto racing) =

NASCAR team owner

- Born: June 5, 1914; Dawsonville, Georgia, U.S.
- Died: June 20, 2010 (aged 96); Atlanta, Georgia, U.S.
- Known for: NASCAR pioneer 1949 Strictly Stock Series champion car owner
- Awards: Georgia Racing Hall of Fame (2002); International Motorsports Hall of Fame (2009); NASCAR Hall of Fame (2017)

Raymond Parks (June 5, 1914 – June 20, 2010) was an American stock car racing team owner. He was the owner of Red Byron's car which won the inaugural NASCAR Strictly Stock Series championship in 1949. Parks was announced as one of the members of the 2017 NASCAR Hall of Fame class.

== Background ==
Parks was the first child of Alfred and Leila Parks and great-great-nephew of settler Benny Parks, who found gold in the state of Georgia in the early nineteenth century. Born in Dawsonville, Georgia, on June 5, 1914, Raymond was the oldest of his father's sixteen children, six of whom were born to Leila, and ten of whom were born to Leila's sister, Ila. Parks left home at age 14 and began hauling moonshine. He served nine months of a one-year and one-day sentence in the federal penitentiary in Chillicothe, Ohio, from 1936 to 1937. Parks served in World War II during the famous Battle of the Bulge in Belgium. He served in the 99th Infantry Division and was briefly stationed at Fort Benning, Georgia. Parks bought a new triple-white Cadillac Eldorado Biarritz in 1979 and owned it until his death in 2010.

== Racing career ==
Most famous for being a moonshine runner who helped to start NASCAR, Parks is recognized as the first "team" owner in stock car racing. Prior to the founding of NASCAR, he was the car owner for moonshine runner and nephews Lloyd Seay and Roy Hall as far back as 1938. In 1948–1949, with Red Byron as the driver Parks's cars won the first two NASCAR Championships ever awarded; the Modified class in 1948, and the above-mentioned championship in 1949.

== Death ==
Parks died on June 20, 2010, at the age of 96. Parks was the last living member of the group who created NASCAR during a meeting at the Streamline Hotel in Daytona Beach, Florida in 1947.

== Awards ==
Parks was one of eight drivers inducted in the first class of the Georgia Racing Hall of Fame in 2002, along with his cousin Lloyd Seay, Byron, Tim Flock, and Bill Elliott. He was inducted in the International Motorsports Hall of Fame in 2009. Parks was inducted into the NASCAR Hall of Fame as a member of the class of 2017.
