= Ana Goñi =

Venezuelan rally co-driver (born 1953)

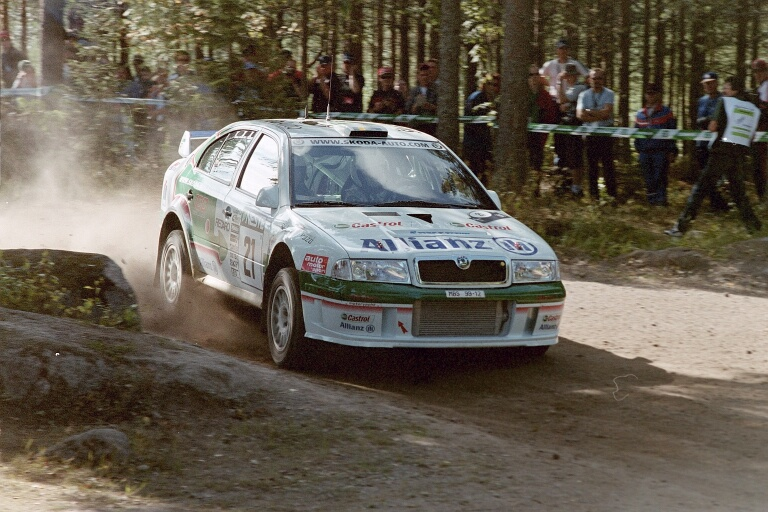
- Goñi and Stig Blomqvist competing in the 2001 Rally Finland

Personal information
- Nationality: (Venezuela) Venezuelan
- Born: 19 April 1953 (age 73)

World Rally Championship record
- Years active: 1999–2004, 2006
- Driver: (United Kingdom) Mike Corns (United Kingdom) Oliver Clark (Sweden) Stig Blomqvist
- Teams: Škoda
- Rallies: 30
- Rally wins: 0
- Podiums: 0
- First rally: 1999 Rally GB
- Last rally: 2006 Swedish Rally

Ana Goñi (born 19 April 1953) is a Venezuelan rally co-driver and motorsport personality. She is best known as the co-driver of Swedish rally legend Stig Blomqvist. Aside from her motorsport interests, Goñi is the owner of Spanish vineyard Bodega Otazu. She has a collection of classic rally cars.

== Career ==
Goñi's first World Rally Championship event was the 1999 Rally of Great Britain, sitting alongside Mike Corns in a Mitsubishi Lancer EVO where they finished in 49th place.

In 2000, Goñi partnered Stig Blomqvist in a Mitsubishi, again in the Rally Great Britain. After a good run, they retired from the event with suspension damage. WRC season 2001 saw the pair compete in 12 rounds of the World Rally Championship for production cars, ending the season in a creditable 5th place in a Mitsubishi. The pair stayed loyal to the Japanese marque until 2003, when, after a brief foray with a Škoda Octavia WRC, they opted for a David Sutton Motorsport prepared Subaru Impreza.

The pair retired from the WRC in 2006 although they still make sporadic appearances and often compete together in classic rally events.

== Personal life ==
Goñi's parents were Spanish Basque and Argentinian immigrants. She has three children and is divorced. She owns the Bodega Otazu vineyard in Spain.
