= Black Mountain (Georgia) =

Mountain in Georgia, United States

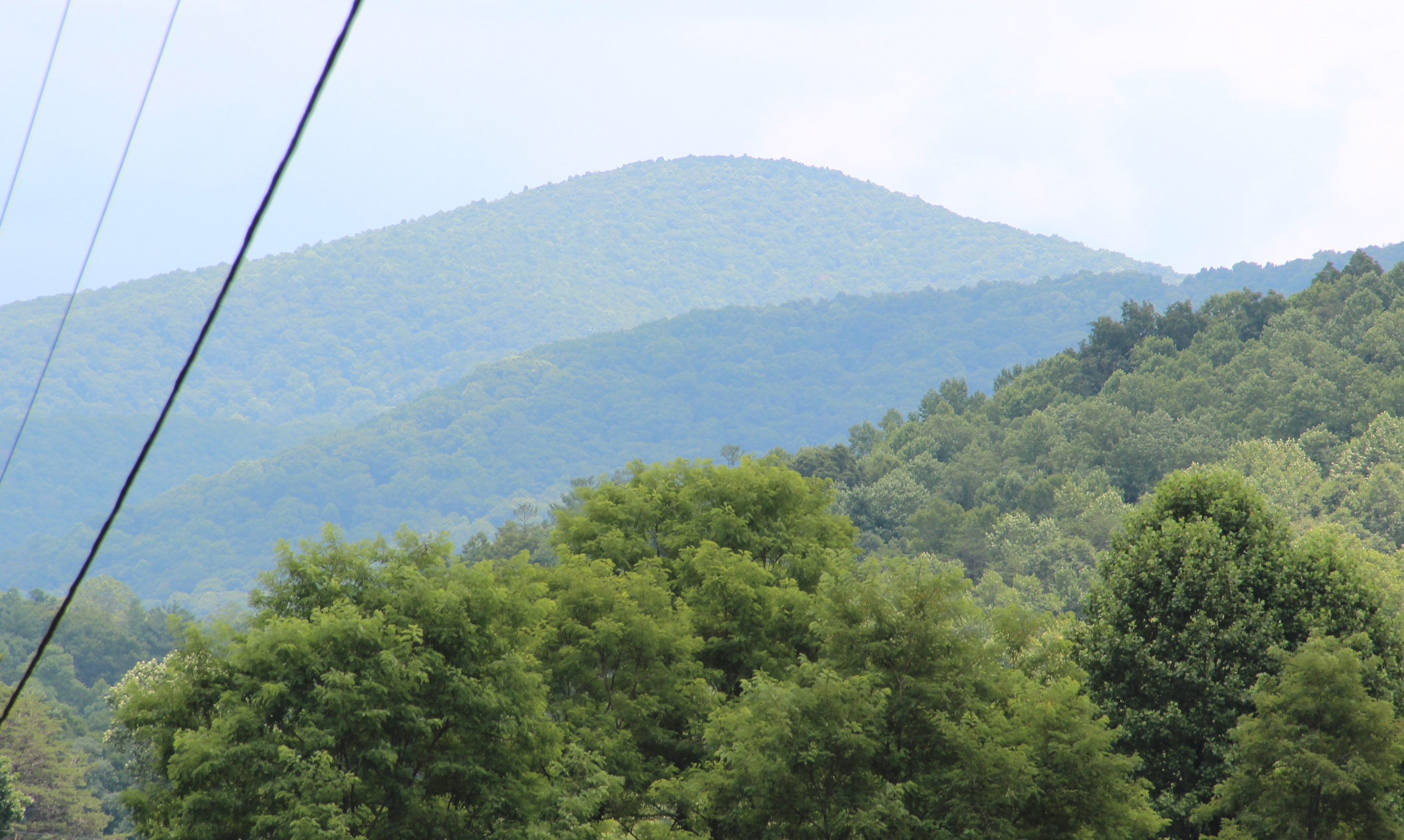
- Black Mountain, viewed from Gilmer County

Highest point
- Elevation: 3609
- Prominence: 400 ft (120 m)
- Listing: Highest point in Dawson County; Ed Jenkins National Recreation Area
- Coordinates: 34°36′48″N 84°12′17″W

Geography
- Location within Georgia
- Location: Dawson County, Georgia; Gilmer County, Georgia
- Parent range: Georgia Blue Ridge Mountains
- Topo map: USGS Nimblewill

Black Mountain is located in Georgia USA on the boundary between Dawson and Gilmer counties. The summit is the highest point in Dawson County. It is in the Chattahoochee National Forest and is part of the Blue Ridge Wildlife Management Area.

== Geography ==
Black Mountain is located on the county line between Dawson and Gilmer counties. Its elevation is about 3,600 feet. The mountain is located about 4 miles north of Amicalola Falls State Park, 14 miles northwest of Dahlonega and 17 miles east/southeast of Ellijay. Springer Mountain, the southern terminus of the Appalachian Trail, is located about 1 mile (1.6 km) northeast of Black Mountain. Other nearby geographical features include Nimblewill Gap, Frosty Mountain and Tickanetley Creek.

== Hiking ==
Black Mountain can be reached via the Appalachian Approach Trail. It is a 5.5-mile (8.9 km) hike north from Amicalola Falls State Park, a 0.6-mile (0.97 km) hike north from Nimblewill Gap, and a 2.3-mile (3.7 km) hike south from Springer Mountain on the trail.
