= Len Foote Hike Inn =

Hostel in Dawson County, Georgia, US

- Interactive map of Len Foote Hike Inn
- Location: Dawson County, Georgia, USA
- Nearest city: Dawsonville, Georgia
- Coordinates: 34°34′01″N 84°14′38″W
- Established: November 1998
- Visitors: 9000 (in 2012)
- Governing body: Georgia State Park; Georgia Department of Natural Resources
- Operator: Appalachian Education & Recreation Services (Open year-round)
- Website: hike-inn.com

The Len Foote Hike Inn is a sustainably designed and LEED-certified ecotourism facility located near the peak of Frosty Mountain in the Chattahoochee National Forest in Dawson County, Georgia, USA. The lodge is open year-round and is only accessible via hiking trails. Twenty rooms, a two-story central lobby, a dining room, a bathhouse, toilets, and a common room comprise the facility.

The Georgia Department of Natural Resources owns the Hike Inn, and the inn is operated by the non-profit Len Foote Hike Inn, Inc. - an affiliate of the Georgia Appalachian Trail Club.

The inn opened in November 1998 and sits at an altitude of 3,100 feet. The surrounding area contains mountain laurel, rhododendron, and oak and hickory trees. Conservation, environmental stewardship and environmental education are stressed at the inn. The facility contains solar-powered hot showers, photo-voltaic solar energy and compostable, odorless toilets. Communal breakfast and dinner meals are included with the stay and are served family-style. Visitors are encouraged to minimize their food waste during meals, and leftover food is composted via a vermiculture program.

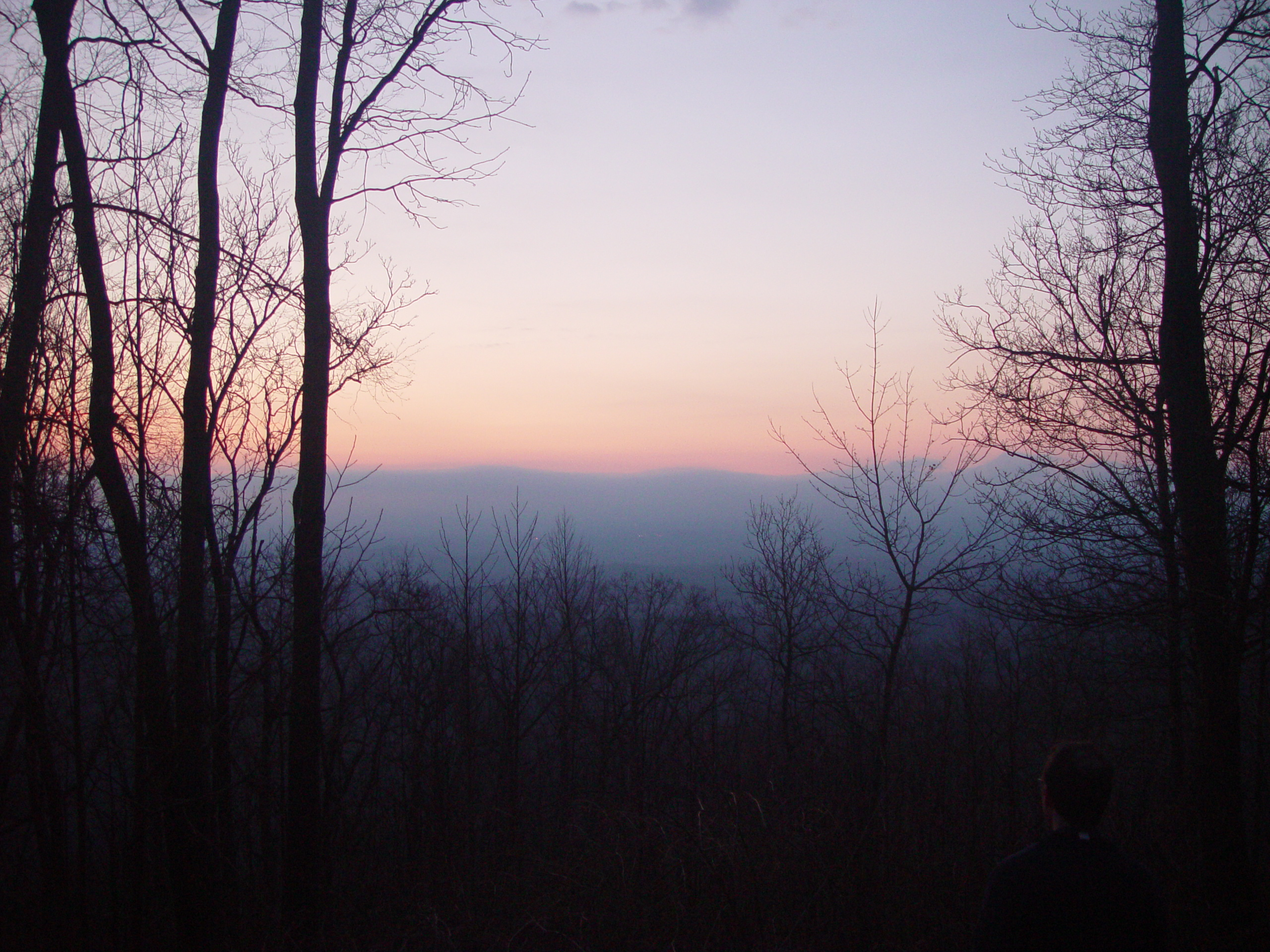
View of the sunrise from the Star Base during the 2004 vernal equinox

The Hike Inn can only be reached by foot. The approach trail to the inn from the south starts at Amicalola Falls State Park in Dawson County, Georgia and requires a five-mile hike. The first .35 miles of this trail to the inn is also part of the approach trail to Springer Mountain, the southern terminus of the Appalachian Trail (AT). Thru-hikers for the AT often start or end their journey at the Hike Inn. The trail to the Inn continues northward past the facility for approximately one-mile to reconnect to the AT approach trail. The trail from Amicalola Falls to the Hike Inn is marked with lime green paint blazes. The rise in elevation during this hike is 500 feet and is listed on park literature and signage as an "easy to moderate" hike.

Also located on the grounds of the inn is a granite celestial calendar formation that aligns with the rising sun during the spring and fall equinoxes. The Star Base was designed by Fernbank Science Center in nearby Atlanta .

== See also ==
- Amicalola Falls State Park
- Springer Mountain
- Chattahoochee National Forest
- Appalachian Trail
