= Mount Oglethorpe =

Mountain in Georgia, United States

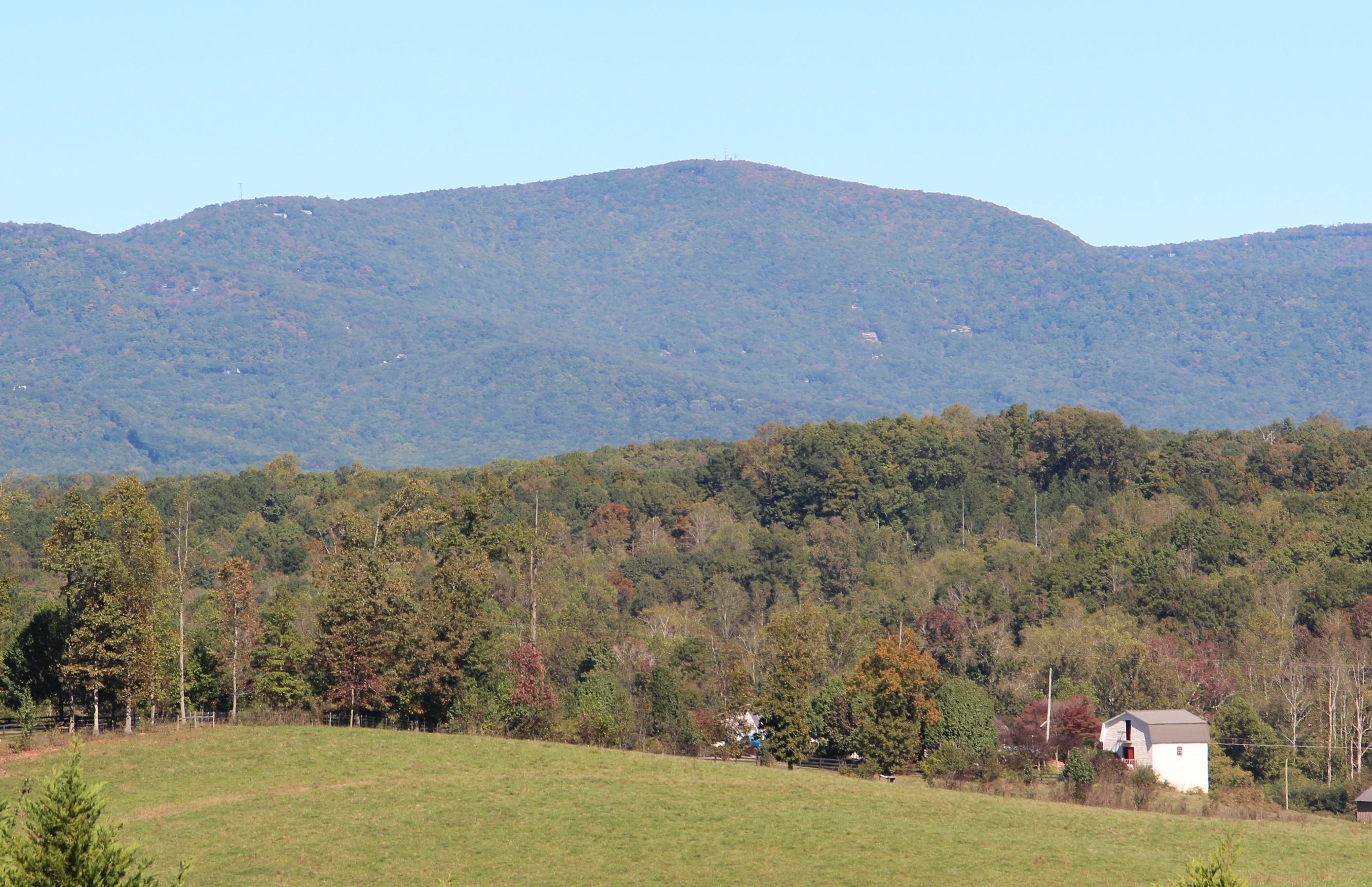
- Mount Oglethorpe in October

Highest point
- Elevation: 3,288 ft (1,002 m)
- Prominence: 1,258 ft
- Coordinates: 34.486229°N 84.331463°W

Geography
- Location within Georgia
- Location: Pickens County, Georgia, U.S.
- Parent range: Blue Ridge Mountains
- Topo map: USGS Nelson

Climbing
- Easiest route: Drive

Mount Oglethorpe is a mountain located in Pickens County, Georgia, United States. The southernmost peak in the Blue Ridge Mountains, the mountain has an elevation of 3,288 feet (1,002 m), making it the highest point in Pickens County.

Mount Oglethorpe served as the southern terminus of the Appalachian Trail from when the trail was completed in 1937 until 1958. In 1958, as a result of over-development around Mount Oglethorpe, the southern terminus of the Appalachian Trail was moved about 13 miles (21 km) to the northeast to Springer Mountain.

== Geography ==
Mount Oglethorpe is located in eastern Pickens County, near the border with Dawson County. The mountain is located about 6 miles (9.7 km) east of Jasper, 13 miles (21 km) west of Dawsonville and about 7 miles (11 km) north of Nelson. There are marble quarries south of Mount Oglethorpe. The community of Bent Tree is located on the mountain's western slopes, while Big Canoe is located on the mountain's eastern slopes. Springer Mountain, the current southern terminus of the Appalachian Trail, is located about 13 miles (21 km) northeast of the mountain. Other nearby geographical features include Burnt Mountain, Sharptop Mountain and Sassafras Mountain. While Mount Oglethorpe's summit is not located on any state or federally protected lands, the mountain's northeastern slopes are located inside the Dawson Forest Wildlife Management Area.

With an elevation of 3,288 feet (1,002 m), Mount Oglethorpe is the tallest mountain in Pickens County. (Note: ListsOfJohn.com lists Burnt Mountain as the tallest mountain in Pickens County, with Mount Oglethorpe coming in second. The reason for this is that Burnt Mountain's elevation is estimated between 3,280 feet (1,000 m) and 3,320 feet (1,010 m), based on 40-foot closed contours.) The mountain is also considered to be the southern terminus of the Blue Ridge Mountains.

== History ==
=== Early history ===
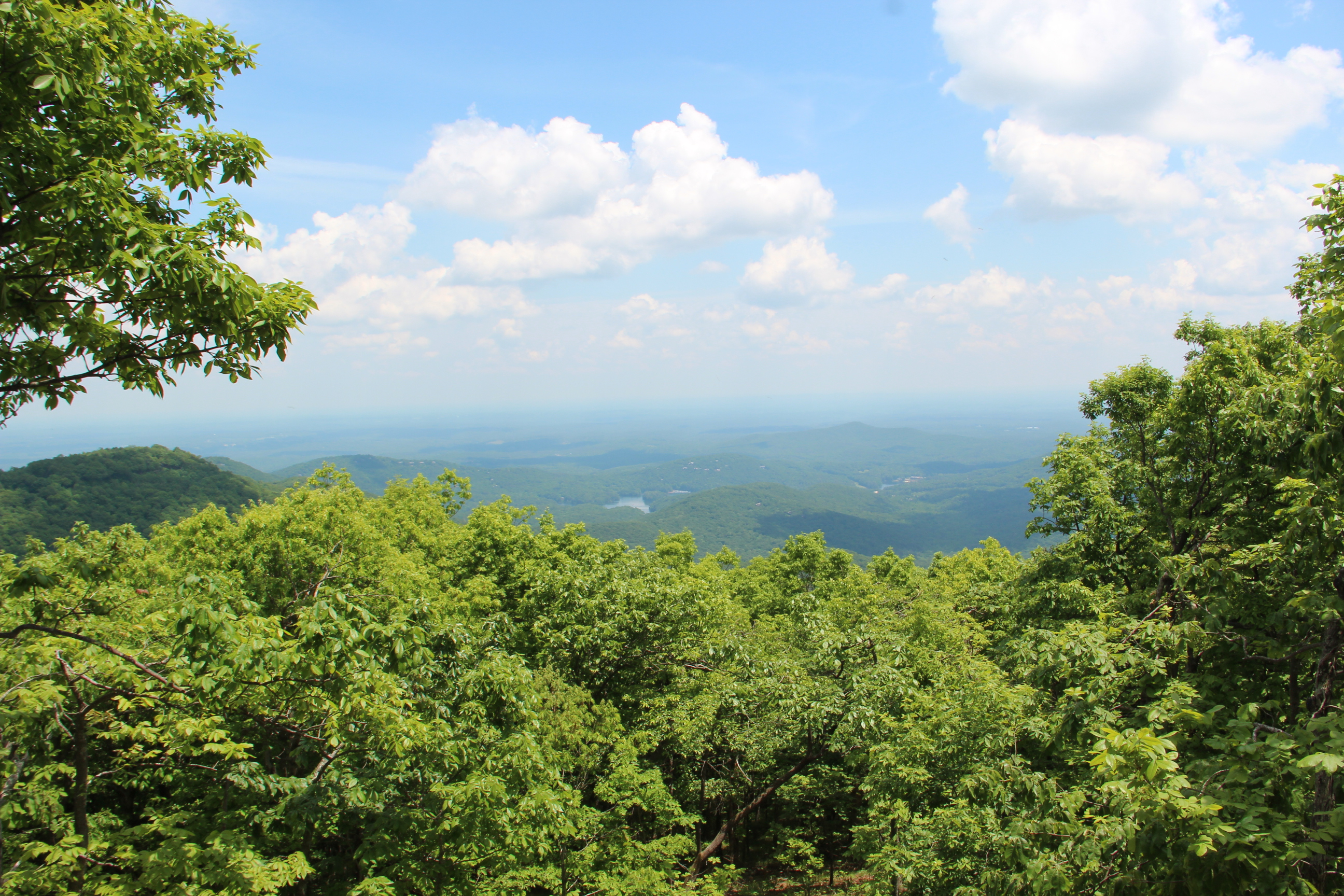
View from Mount Oglethorpe

Mount Oglethorpe had been settled by the Cherokees since at least the 1700s. The Cherokees bent trees to mark their trails and shelters on the mountain. White settlers began moving into the area after the Georgia Land Lotteries of the early 1800s.

Mount Oglethorpe was originally named Grassy Knob. In 1930, the mountain was renamed to Mount Oglethorpe in honor of James Oglethorpe, the founder of the Georgia Colony. That same year, a 38 feet (12 m) tall marble obelisk named the Oglethorpe Monument was erected at the top of the mountain.

=== Appalachian Trail ===
In 1930, Mount Oglethorpe was designated as the southern terminus of the Appalachian Trail. Mount Oglethorpe was not the first choice for the trail's southern end, as Benton MacKaye also proposed ending the Appalachian Trail at Mount Mitchell in North Carolina or Cohutta Mountain in northwest Georgia.

There were several reasons for choosing the Mountain Oglethorpe as the southern terminus. The mountain was considered to be the southern end of the Blue Ridge Mountains. The decision was also influenced by Sam Tate, an influential local businessman and president of the Georgia Marble Company. Tate was planning to build a resort on a nearby mountain and wanted the trail to pass by his resort. To convince the Georgia Appalachian Trail Club to choose Mount Oglethorpe, Tate donated money to build trail structures and allowed the trail to pass through his privately owned lands.

In 1937, with the completion of the Appalachian Trail, Mount Oglethorpe officially became the southern terminus of the trail. Early thru-hikers of the Appalachian Trail such as Grandma Gatewood, Gene Espy and Earl Shaffer began their journeys at Mount Oglethorpe. In 1949, James E. Boyd conducted long-range line-of-sight experiments between the mountain and Georgia Tech to study the effects of weather on microwave propagation.

Because Mount Oglethorpe was located outside of United States National Forest lands, the mountain was not protected and was opened to development. In the 1950s, land on the mountain was purchased by logging companies and chicken ranchers. The construction of a gravel road on the mountain led to vandalism. With the increased development on Mount Oglethorpe, the Georgia Appalachian Trail Club decided to move the trailhead. Amicalola Lake and Frosty Mountain were considered for the new southern terminus, but trail leaders deemed those locations as being too accessible. In 1958, trail leaders decided to move the southern terminus to Springer Mountain, about a 20 miles (32 km) hike north from Mount Oglethorpe. Springer Mountain was considered to be less dramatic than Mount Oglethorpe, but because of its remoteness, Springer Mountain was also considered to be less susceptible to development. The only remnant of the Appalachian Trail between Mount Oglethorpe and Springer Mountain is the Appalachian Approach Trail that runs between Amicalola Falls State Park and Springer Mountain.

=== After the Appalachian Trail ===
Communication and FAA towers were installed on the mountain's summit in the years after the southern terminus was moved. In the 1970s, the Big Canoe community started development on the eastern side of Mount Oglethorpe. Vandalism, harsh weather and lightning strikes caused heavy damage to the Oglethorpe Monument, leading to its relocation to downtown Jasper in 1999. Portions of the Appalachian Trail that used to run between Mount Oglethorpe and Springer Mountain were made inaccessible to the public. In addition, Mount Oglethorpe's summit was closed to the public.

In 1995, Billie Ann Rice purchased at auction about 107 acres (43 ha) of land around Mount Oglethorpe's summit. In 2014, Billie Ann, and her husband Ken, began fulfilling her vision for the land and created a park on the mountain and designated their property as a public park. This public park, named Eagle's Rest, contains hiking trails and observation decks. Their daughters Annette Hall and Kathleen Ingram are still on the board for the park, which continues to improve.

== Visiting ==
Before 2014, visitors were unable to access the summit without trespassing. After the summit was opened to the public, Mount Oglethorpe's summit can be reached by driving south from Georgia State Route 136 on Monument Road for about 5 miles (8.0 km). The summit can also be accessed from the south through Big Canoe.

== Gallery ==
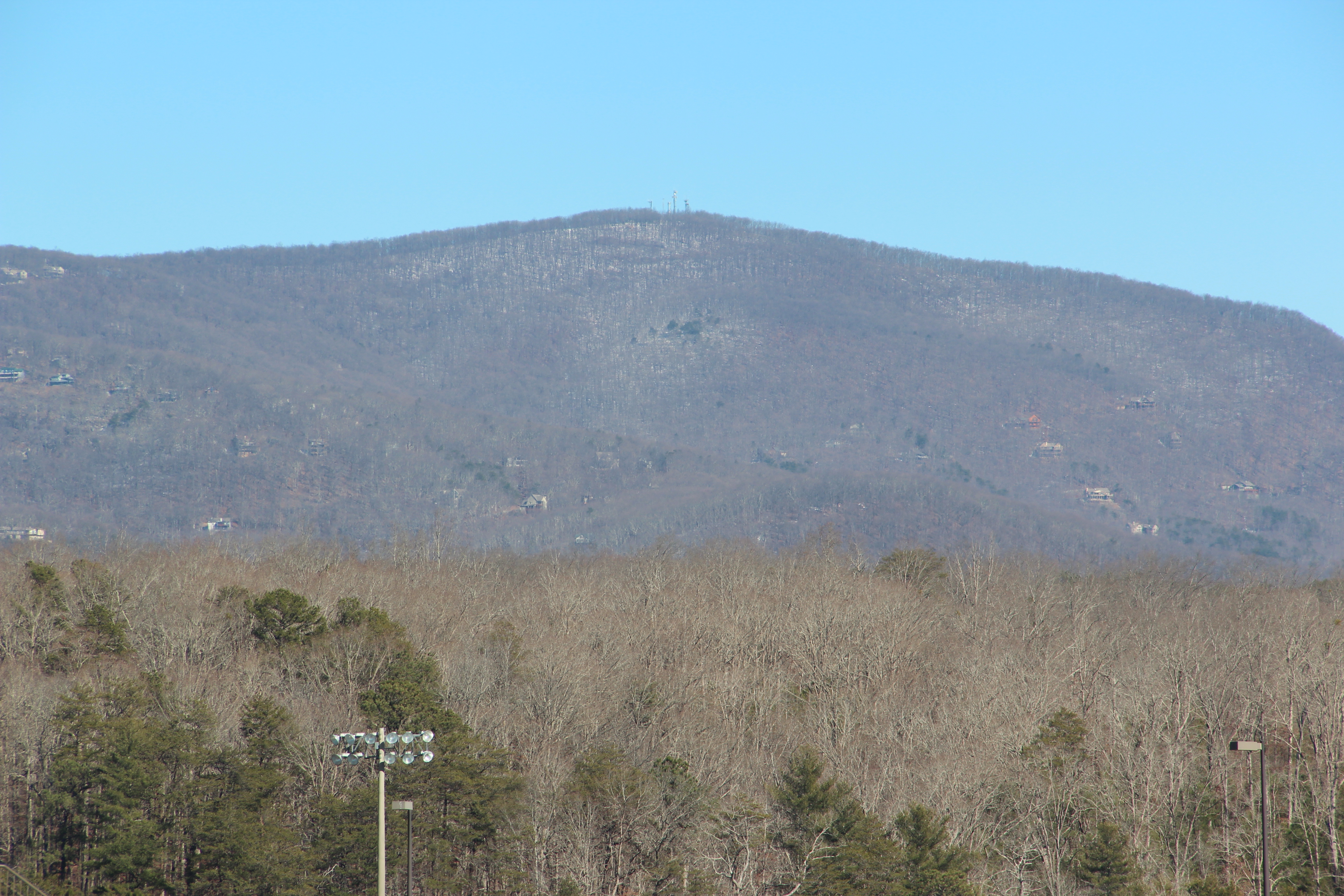
Mount Oglethorpe with a dusting of snow.

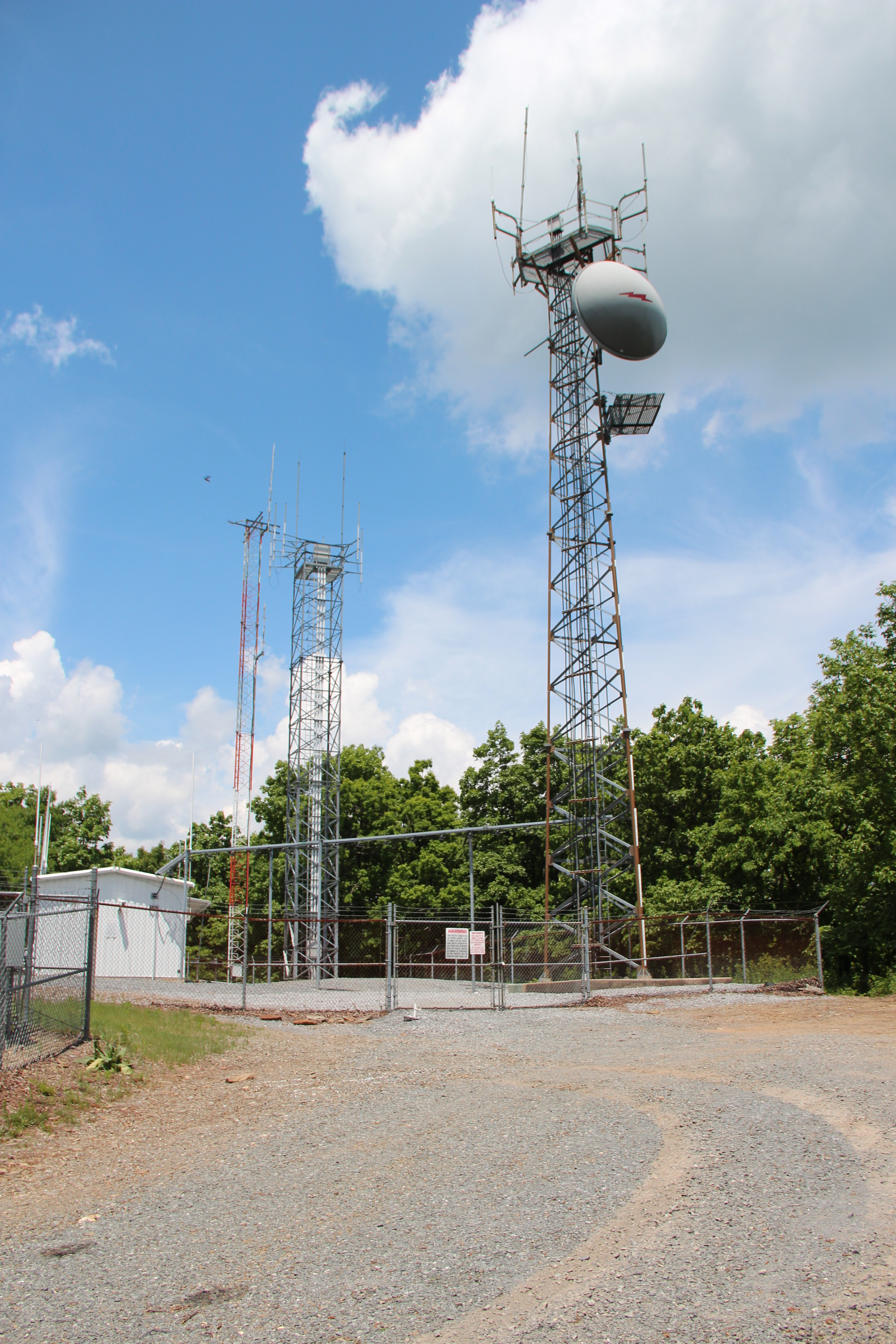
Communication towers on the summit

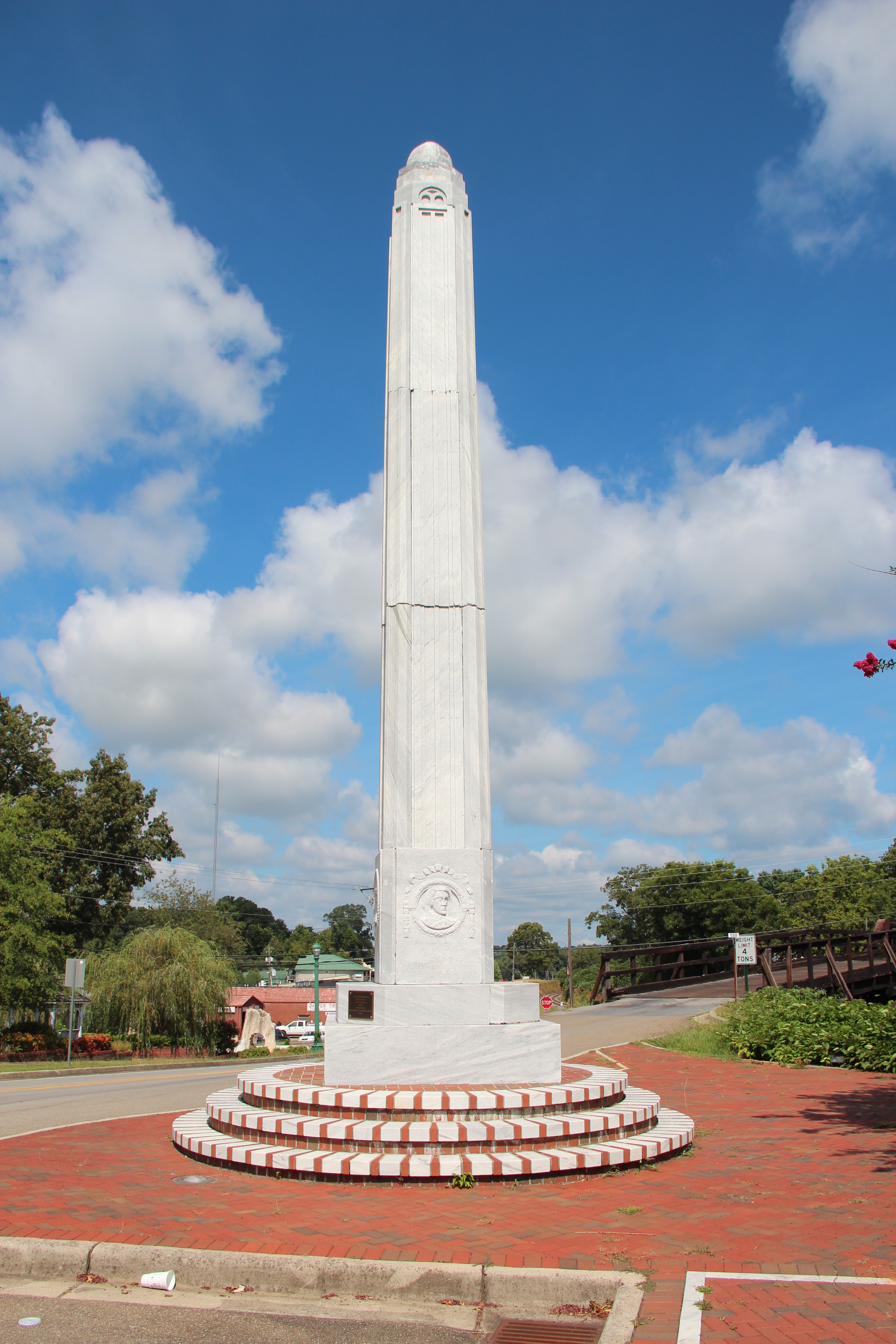
The Oglethorpe Monument. Formerly on Mount Oglethorpe's summit, the monument is now located in Jasper

== See also ==
- List of mountain peaks of North America
  - List of mountain peaks of the United States
    - List of U.S. states by elevation
    - List of mountains in Georgia (U.S. state)

== Bibliography ==
- Adkins, Leonard (2012). Along the Appalachian Trail: Georgia, North Carolina, and Tennessee. Arcadia Publishing. ISBN 9780738591032.
- Luxenberg, Larry (1994). Walking the Appalachian Trail. Stackpole Books. ISBN 9780811730952.
- Mittlefehldt, Sarah (November 15, 2013). Tangled Roots: The Appalachian Trail and American Environmental Politics. University of Washington Press. ISBN 9780295804880.
- Montgomery, Ben (April 1, 2014). Grandma Gatewood's Walk: The Inspiring Story of the Woman Who Saved the Appalachian Trail. Chicago Review Press. ISBN 9781613747186.
- Nash, Steve (July 11, 2003). Blue Ridge 2020: an owner's manual. Univ of North Carolina Press. ISBN 9780807861127.
