= Pat Corrales =

American baseball player and manager (1941–2023)

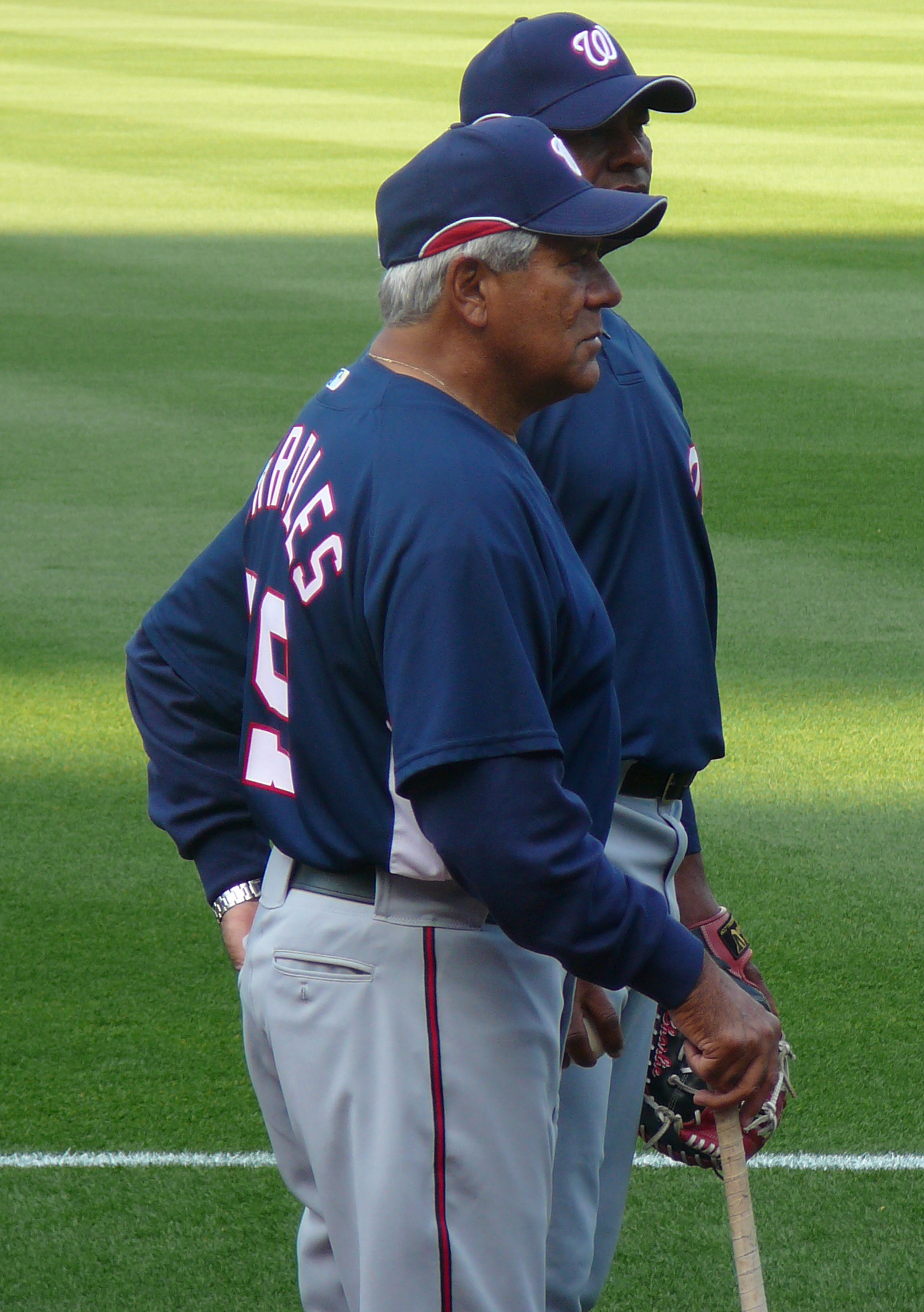
- Corrales with the Nationals in 2008
- Catcher / Manager
- Born: March 20, 1941; Los Angeles, California, U.S.
- Died: August 27, 2023 (aged 82); Big Canoe, Georgia, U.S.
- Batted: Right Threw: Right

MLB debut
- August 2, 1964, for the Philadelphia Phillies

Last MLB appearance
- September 21, 1973, for the San Diego Padres

MLB statistics
- Batting average: .216
- Home runs: 4
- Runs batted in: 54
- Managerial record: 572–634
- Winning %: .474
- Stats at Baseball Reference
- Managerial record at Baseball Reference

Teams
- As player: Philadelphia Phillies (1964–1965); St. Louis Cardinals (1966); Cincinnati Reds (1968–1972); San Diego Padres (1972–1973); As manager: Texas Rangers (1978–1980); Philadelphia Phillies (1982–1983); Cleveland Indians (1983–1987); As coach: Texas Rangers (1976–1978); New York Yankees (1989); Atlanta Braves (1990–2006); Washington Nationals (2007–2008, 2009, 2011)

Career highlights and awards
- World Series champion (1995)

Patrick Corrales (March 20, 1941 – August 27, 2023) was an American professional baseball catcher, manager, and coach, who played in Major League Baseball (MLB), from 1964 to 1973, primarily for the Cincinnati Reds as well as the Philadelphia Phillies, St. Louis Cardinals, and San Diego Padres. He was the first major league manager of Mexican American descent.

== Early life ==
Patrick Corrales was born in Los Angeles on March 20, 1941. He was a baseball and football star at Fresno High School in Fresno, California, and a teammate of future major-league pitchers Jim Maloney and Dick Ellsworth. An offensive guard and linebacker for the football team, he was named lineman of the year by The Fresno Bee. After high school, he signed as an amateur free agent with the Phillies in 1959.

== Career ==
=== Playing career ===
Corrales made his major league playing debut at age 23 on August 2, 1964, with the Phillies. He pinch-hit for pitcher John Boozer in the fifth inning, grounding out against the Los Angeles Dodgers' Larry Miller in a 6–1 Phillies loss at Connie Mack Stadium. His first career hit came the next year on June 15, 1965, in a 12–7 Phillies loss to the Milwaukee Braves at County Stadium when he singled in the eighth inning off Tony Cloninger and later scored. He had one of his best career games the next day when, in a 6–2 Phillies win over the Braves, he started at catcher and went 3–4 with his first major league home run (a two-run shot in the third inning against Denny Lemaster).

After the 1965 season, the Phillies traded Corrales, Alex Johnson, and Art Mahaffey to the St. Louis Cardinals for Bill White, Dick Groat, and Bob Uecker. He was a backup to Tim McCarver during the 1966 season and spent the 1967 season in the minor leagues. Before the 1968 season, the Cardinals traded Corrales and Jimy Williams to the Cincinnati Reds for Johnny Edwards. Corrales served as a backup to Johnny Bench, before the Reds traded him to the San Diego Padres on June 11, 1972, for Bob Barton. With the Padres, Corrales was the backup to Fred Kendall.

In a nine-year playing career as a backup catcher, Corrales played in 300 games with 166 hits, four home runs, 54 runs batted in, and a .216 batting average. He appeared in one game of the 1970 World Series for the Reds and batted once, grounding out for the final out of the series as the Reds fell in five games to the Baltimore Orioles.

=== Managerial and coaching career ===
Corrales became a coach for the Texas Rangers in 1976. On the last day of the 1978 season, the Rangers fired manager Billy Hunter and named Corrales their new manager. The Rangers fired Corrales after the 1980 season.

The Phillies hired Corrales as their manager after the 1981 season. On July 18, 1983, the Phillies fired Corrales, despite the Phillies having a 43–42 (.506) record and tied for first place with the St. Louis Cardinals in the National League East. Corrales had benched Mike Schmidt and Pete Rose while confusing veteran players with his changes to the lineups.

Two weeks after being fired by the Phillies, the Indians hired Corrales as their manager. They retained him for after the 1983 season with a two-year contract extension. After the 1985 season, the Indians signed Corrales to a perpetual contract. The Indians fired him in July 1987. Corrales spent nine years as a major league manager and finished with an overall record of 572–634 (.474) with the Rangers, Phillies, and Indians.

The New York Yankees hired Corrales as their first base coach for the 1989 season. The Yankees fired their manager and most of their coaching staff, including Corrales, in August 1989. The following month he joined the Atlanta Braves as a scout. He served as the Braves' bench coach for nine years, and was with Washington Nationals for the 2007 and 2008 seasons, before being fired at the end of 2008 along with the majority of the Nationals' coaching staff. Shortly after being fired, he accepted a job as a special consultant to the Nationals. He resumed as bench coach in July 2009 after Jim Riggleman was appointed acting manager to replace Manny Acta. Corrales was once again appointed Nats bench coach in June 2011 by new manager Davey Johnson. Corrales replaced John McLaren, who had been reassigned to scouting duty.

On November 5, 2012, Corrales was hired by the Los Angeles Dodgers as a special assistant to the general manager.

==== Managerial record ====
Team	Year	Regular season					Postseason			
Team	Year	Games	Won	Lost	Win %	Finish	Won	Lost	Win %	Result
TEX	1978	1	1	0	1.000	Interim	–	–	–	
TEX	1979	162	83	79	.512	3rd in AL West	–	–	–	
TEX	1980	161	76	85	.472	4th in AL West	–	–	–	
TEX total		324	160	164	.494		0	0	–	
PHI	1982	162	89	73	.549	2nd in NL East	–	–	–	
PHI	1983	85	43	42	.506	Fired	–	–	–	
PHI total		247	132	115	.534		0	0	–	
CLE	1983	62	30	32	.484	Interim	–	–	–	
CLE	1984	162	75	87	.463	6th in AL East	–	–	–	
CLE	1985	162	60	102	.370	7th in AL East	–	–	–	
CLE	1986	162	84	78	.519	5th in AL East	–	–	–	
CLE	1987	87	31	56	.356	Fired	–	–	–	
CLE total		635	280	355	.441		0	0	–	
Total		1216	572	634	.474		0	0	–	

== Personal life ==
Corrales married Sharon Ann Grimes on September 24, 1960, and had four children. Sharon died from a blood clot soon after giving birth to the couple's fourth child in July 1969. He married Heidyt Enedina Davis, May 28, 1970, in Jellico, Tennessee.

Corrales was inducted as a member of the Fresno County Athletic Hall of Fame in 1980.

Pat Corrales died at home in Big Canoe, Georgia, on August 27, 2023, at age 82.

Preceded by Eddie Rodríguez	Washington Nationals Bench Coach; 2007–2008	Succeeded by Jim Riggleman
Preceded by Jim Riggleman	Washington Nationals Bench Coach; 2009	Succeeded by John McLaren
