= Springer Mountain =

Mountain in northern Georgia known as the southern terminus of the Appalachian Trail

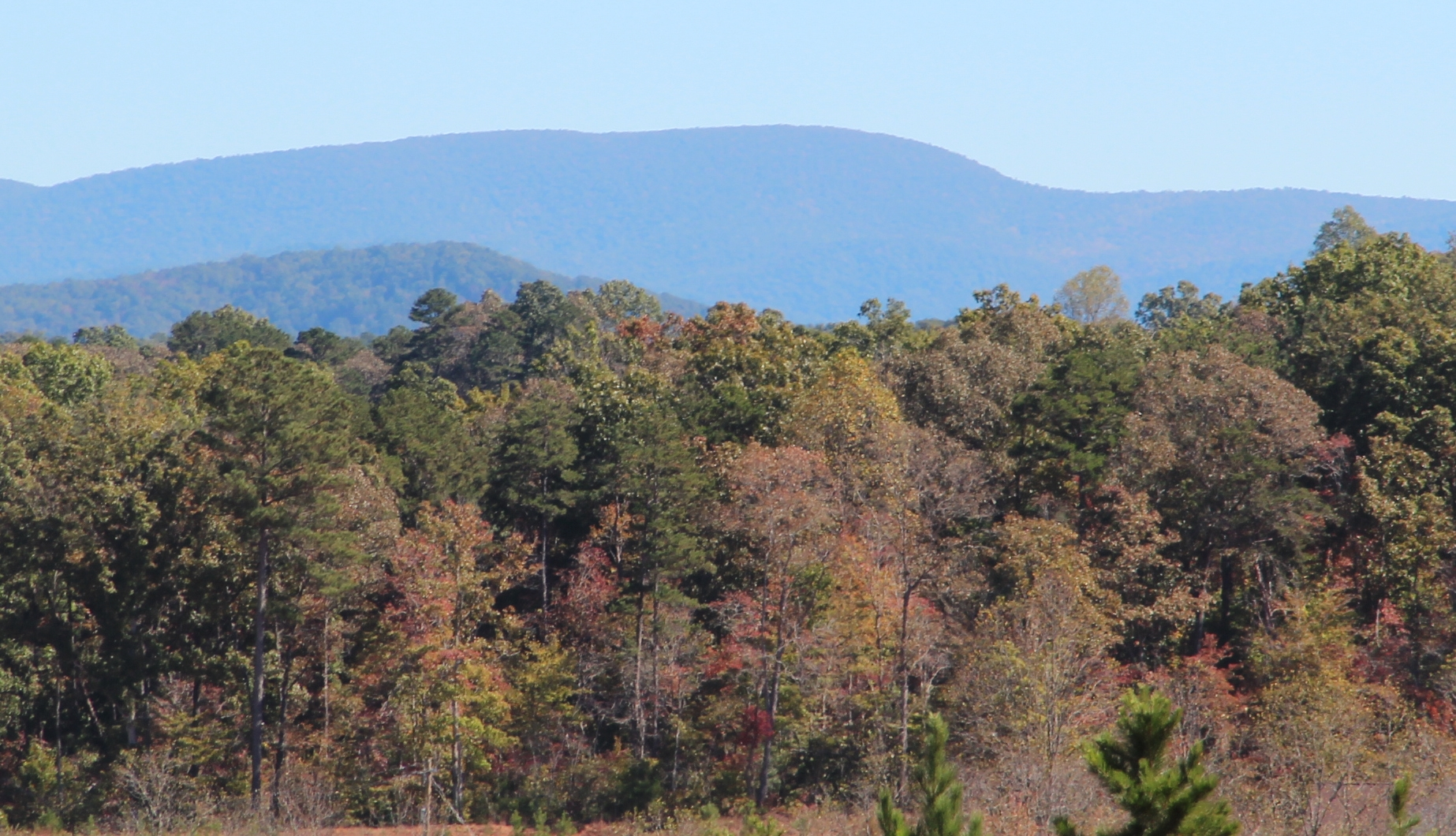
- Springer Mountain viewed from East Ellijay

Highest point
- Elevation: 3,770 feet (1,149 m)
- Prominence: 1,142 ft (348 m)
- Coordinates: 34°37′36″N 84°11′37″W

Geography
- Location within Georgia
- Location: Fannin County, Georgia; Gilmer County, Georgia
- Parent range: Blue Ridge Mountains
- Topo map: USGS Noontootla

Climbing
- First ascent: unknown
- Easiest route: Appalachian Trail

Springer Mountain is a mountain located in the Chattahoochee National Forest on the border of Fannin and Gilmer counties. Located in the Blue Ridge Mountains in northern Georgia, the mountain has an elevation of about 3,770 feet (1,149 m). Springer Mountain serves as the southern terminus for the Appalachian and Benton MacKaye trails.

== Name ==
The origin of the name of Springer Mountain is unclear. One possible origin was that it was named in honor of William G. Springer, an early settler appointed in 1833 by Governor Wilson Lumpkin to implement legislation to improve conditions for the Indians. Another possibility was that Springer Mountain was named for the first Presbyterian minister to be ordained in Georgia, John Springer, who was ordained in 1790.

The mountain has been called Springer since at least 1910. As late as 1959, some residents of Gilmer County were still calling the peak Penitentiary Mountain. According to the Gilmer County Historical Society, the name was officially changed by the Georgia Appalachian Trail Club (GATC). It is unknown why the mountain was named Penitentiary. There is no known Cherokee name for the mountain.

== Geography ==
Springer Mountain is a north–south-trending loaf-shaped mountain located on the border of Gilmer and Fannin counties. The summit has an elevation 3,782 feet (1,153 m) above mean sea level. Springer Mountain is part of the Blue Ridge Mountains that extend from Georgia to Maine. Springer Mountain divides the northern and southern extensions of the Blue Ridge in Georgia, with one branch heading northwest to the Cohutta Mountains and the other branch heading southwest to Mount Oglethorpe. Springer Mountain is located inside the Chattahoochee National Forest, as well as the Ed Jenkins National Recreation Area.

The mountain is located about 17 miles (27 km) east of Ellijay, 14 miles (23 km) northwest of Dahlonega and 11 miles (18 km) southwest of Suches. Mount Oglethorpe, the original southern terminus of the Appalachian Trail, is located about 14 miles (23 km) south of Springer Mountain. Other nearby geographical features include Black Mountain, Tickanetley Creek and Winding Stair Gap.

== Hiking ==
=== Appalachian Trail ===
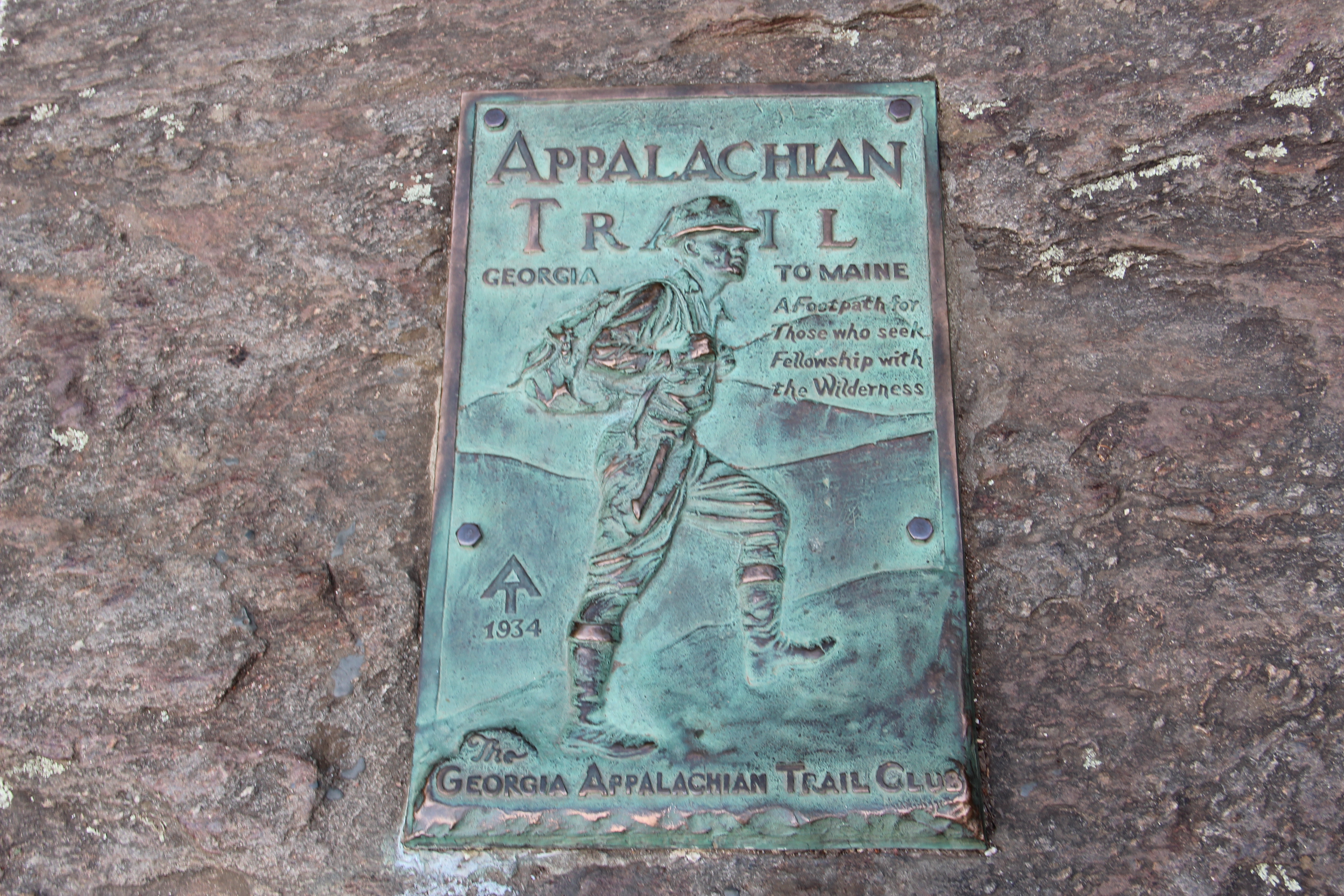
Appalachian Trail plaque at top of Springer Mountain

In 1958, the southern terminus of the Appalachian Trail was relocated from Mount Oglethorpe to Springer Mountain. The reason for this relocation was because of increased development around Mount Oglethorpe. Springer Mountain was considered to be less dramatic than Mount Oglethorpe, but because of its remoteness, Springer Mountain was also considered to be less susceptible to development.

One way to climb Springer Mountain is from a parking lot on Forest Service Road 42, located 0.9 miles (1.4 km) north up the Appalachian Trail from the summit. Hikers desiring to hike north from Springer Mountain would begin by hiking 0.9 miles (1.4 km) south on the Appalachian Trail before turning around to hike north. At the peak of Springer Mountain is a bronze plaque with the Appalachian Trail logo, a register for hikers to sign, and a benchmark.

In addition to the Appalachian Trail, Springer Mountain can be reached from the south via the Appalachian Approach Trail. The approach trail starts at the visitor center of Amicalola Falls State Park and is 8.5 miles (13.7 km) in length. The Appalachian Trail Conservancy recommends that Appalachian Trail hikers start at the Amicalola Falls State Park instead of Forest Service Road 42 as overcrowding on the service road can block emergency vehicles. The approach trail was a part of the original Appalachian Trail until 1958, and was a part of the section that went down to Mount Oglethorpe.

=== Benton MacKaye Trail ===
Springer Mountain is also home to the southern terminus of the Benton MacKaye Trail. The trailhead for the Benton MacKaye Trail is located around 0.3 miles (0.48 km) north of the summit.

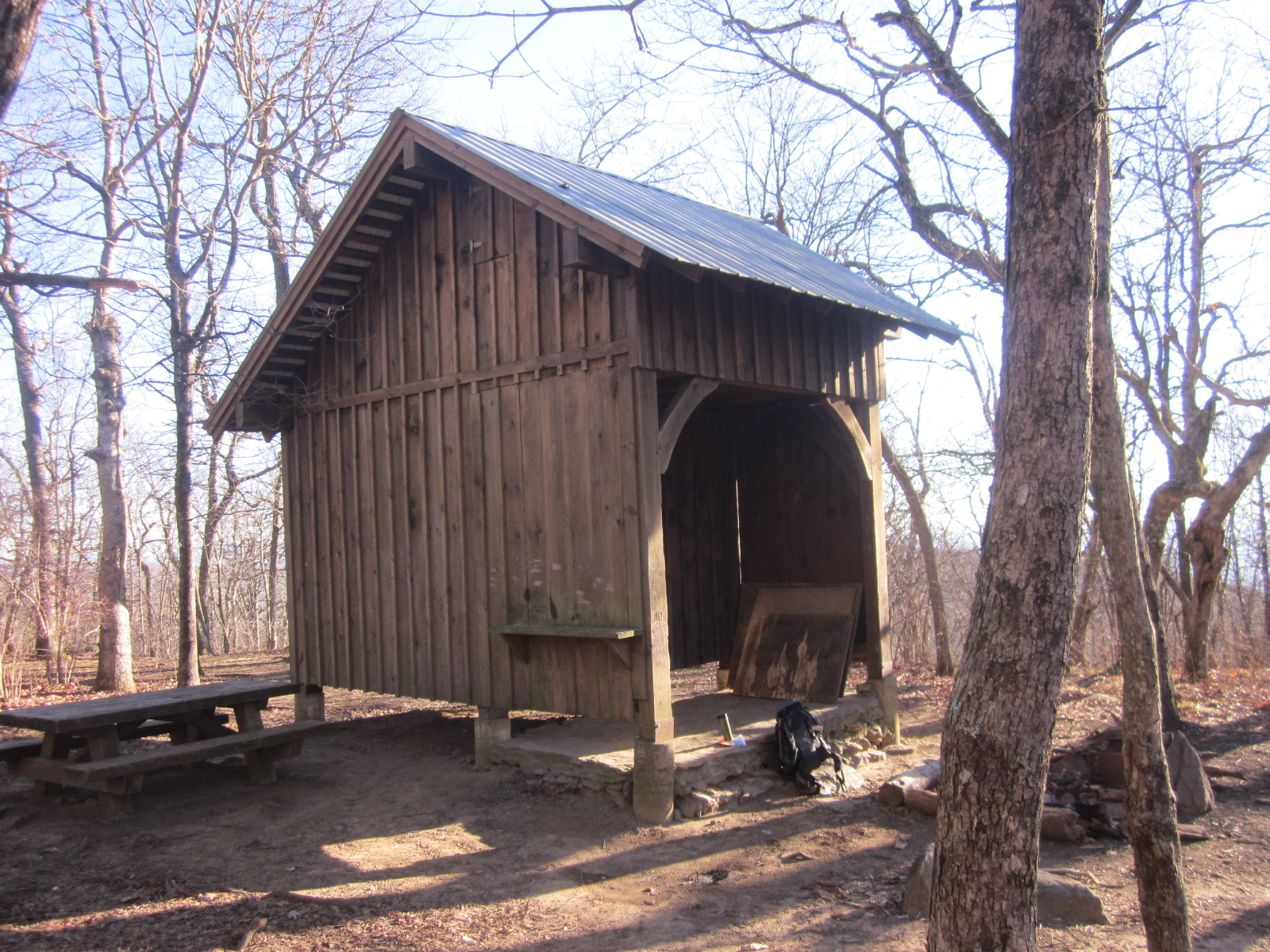
The Springer Mountain Shelter.

=== Shelters ===
The nearest shelter from the summit is the Springer Mountain Shelter, located about 0.2 miles (0.32 km) north of the summit. A water spring is located near this shelter. The shelter was built in 1993 and is maintained by the Georgia Appalachian Trail Club. Another nearby shelter is the Black Gap Shelter, located about 1.5 miles (2.4 km) south of the summit on the Appalachian Approach Trail.

== Gallery ==
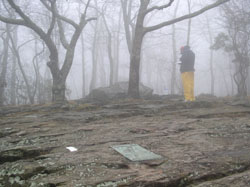
A hiker signs the Appalachian Trail register at Springer Mountain

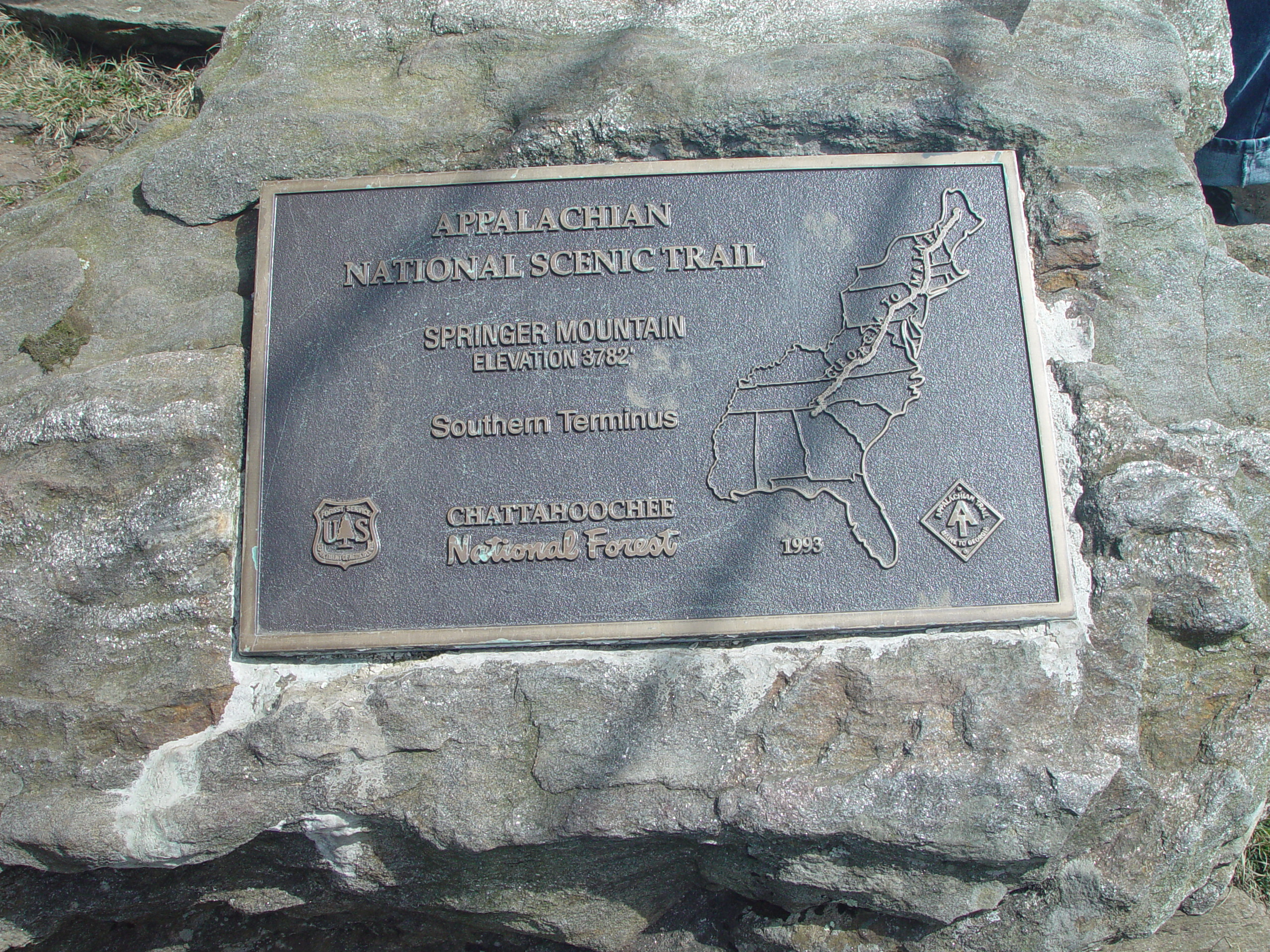
Appalachian Trail marker

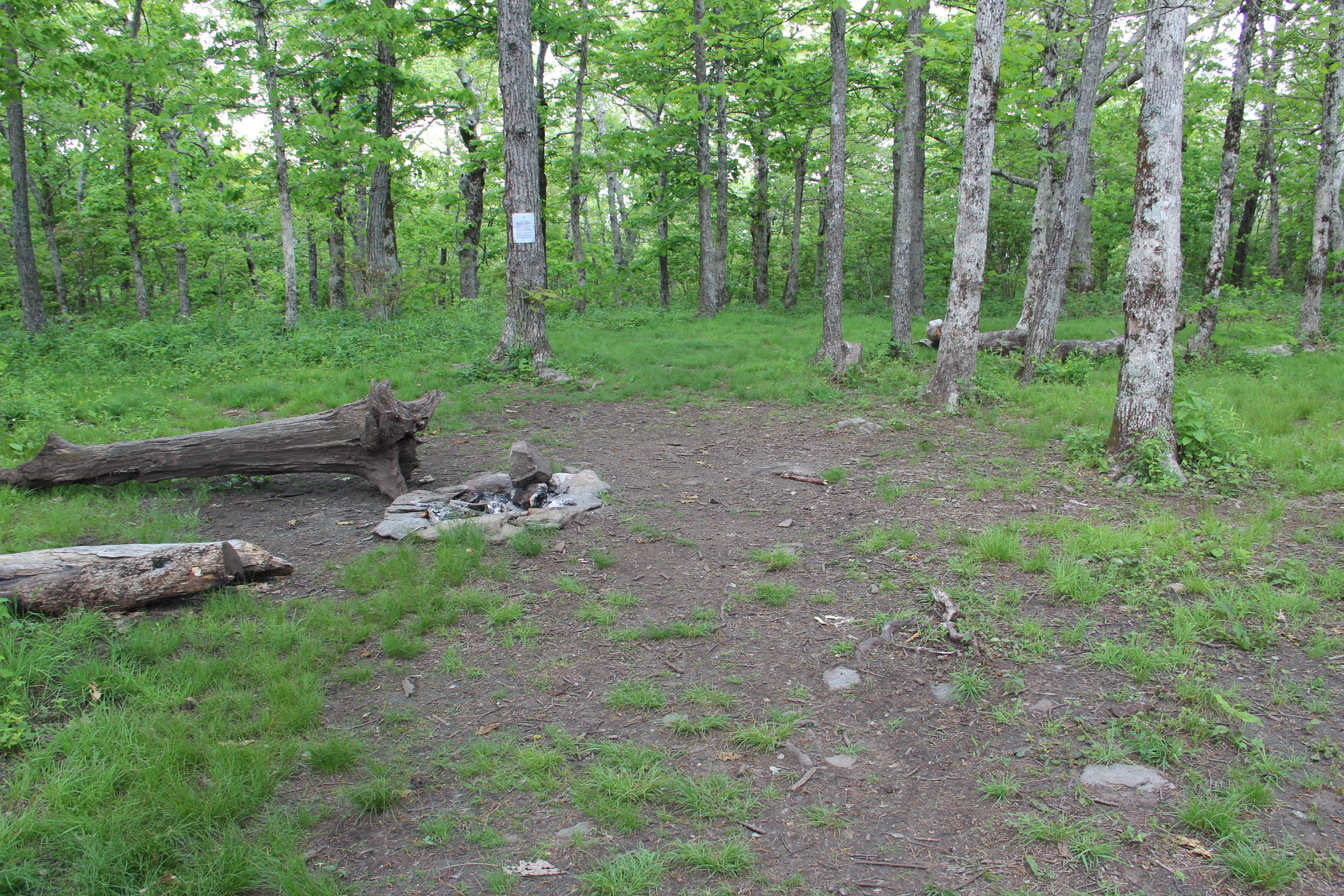
Campsite on top of the mountain

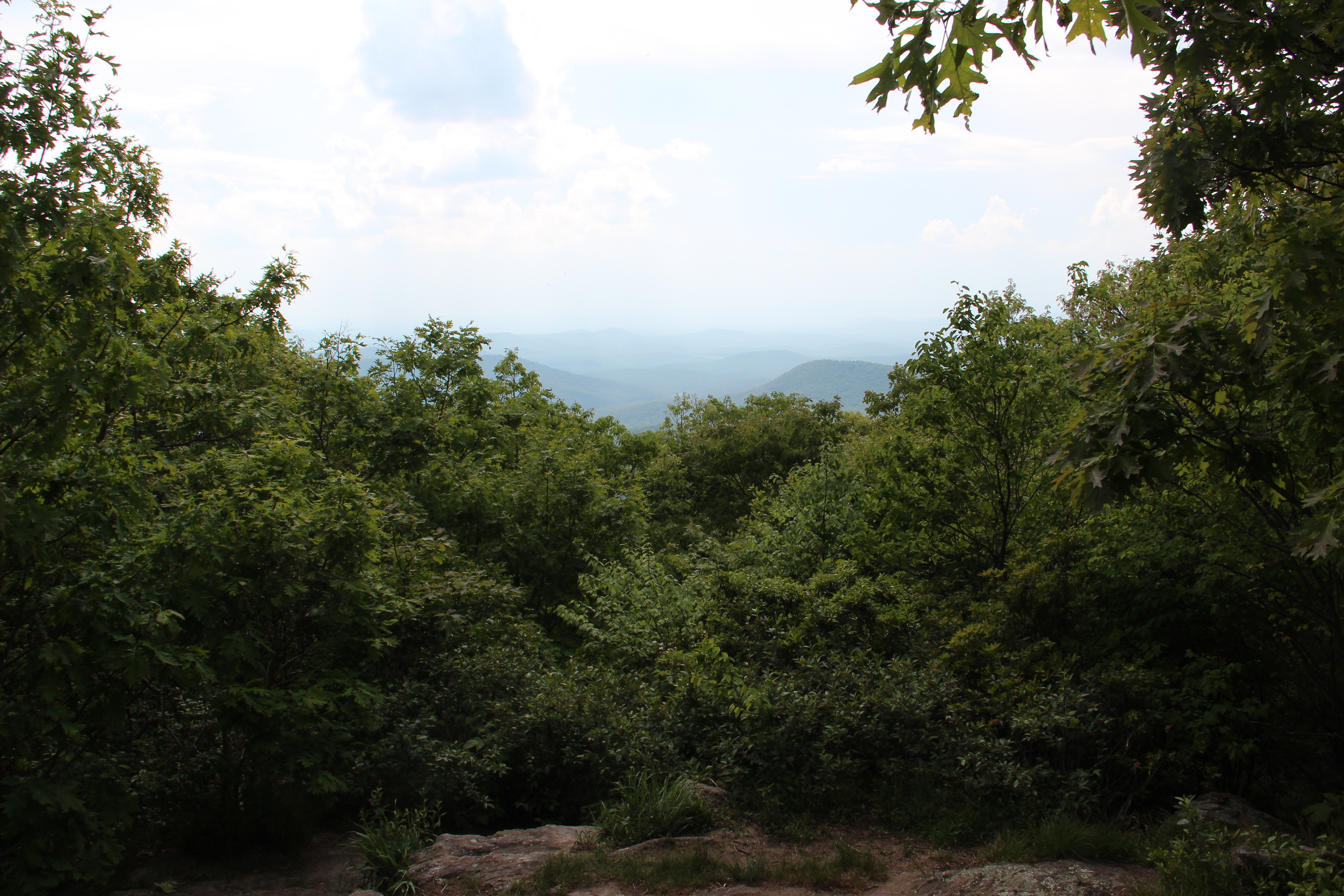
View from Springer Mountain in May

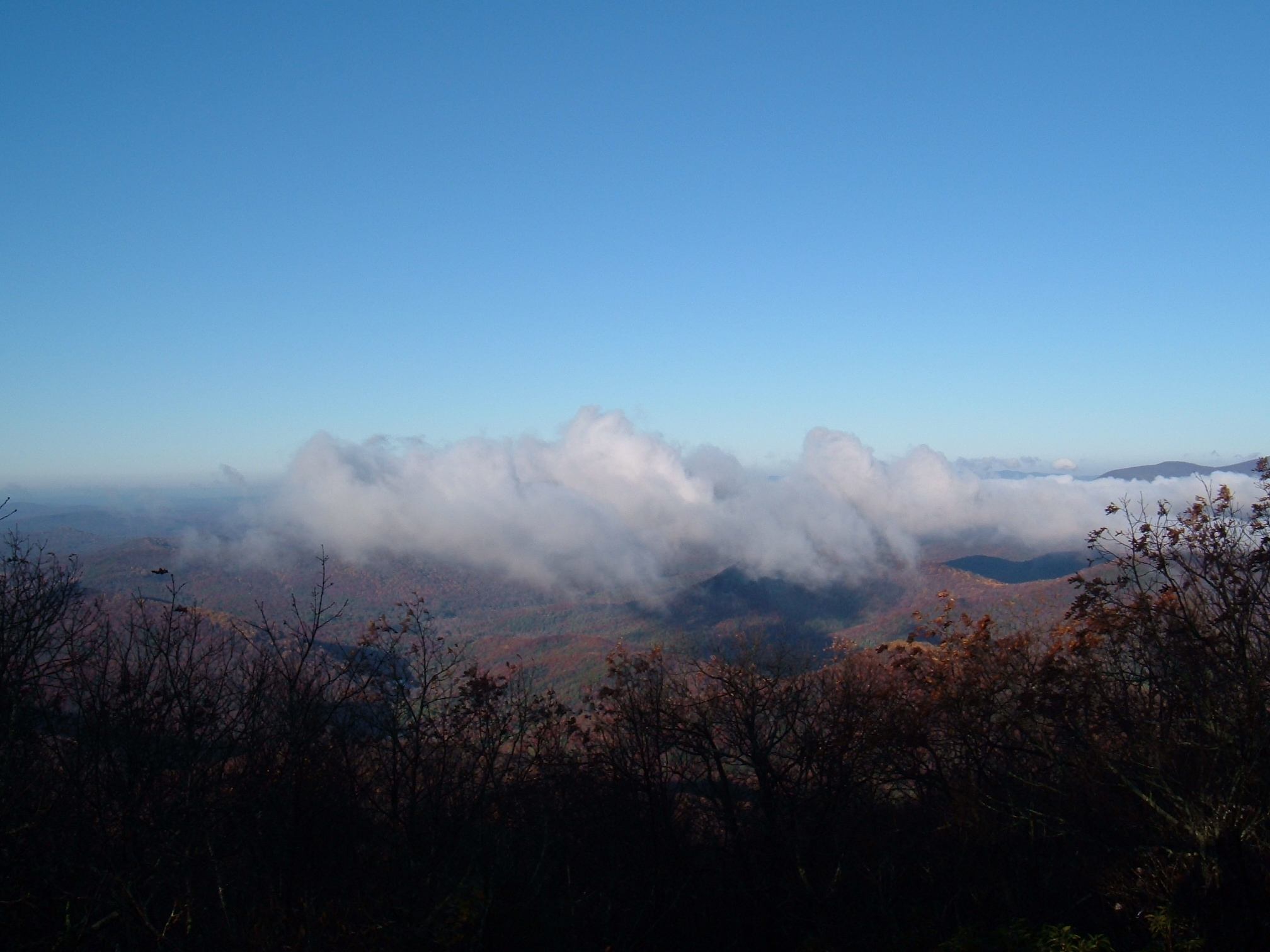
View from Springer Mountain in November

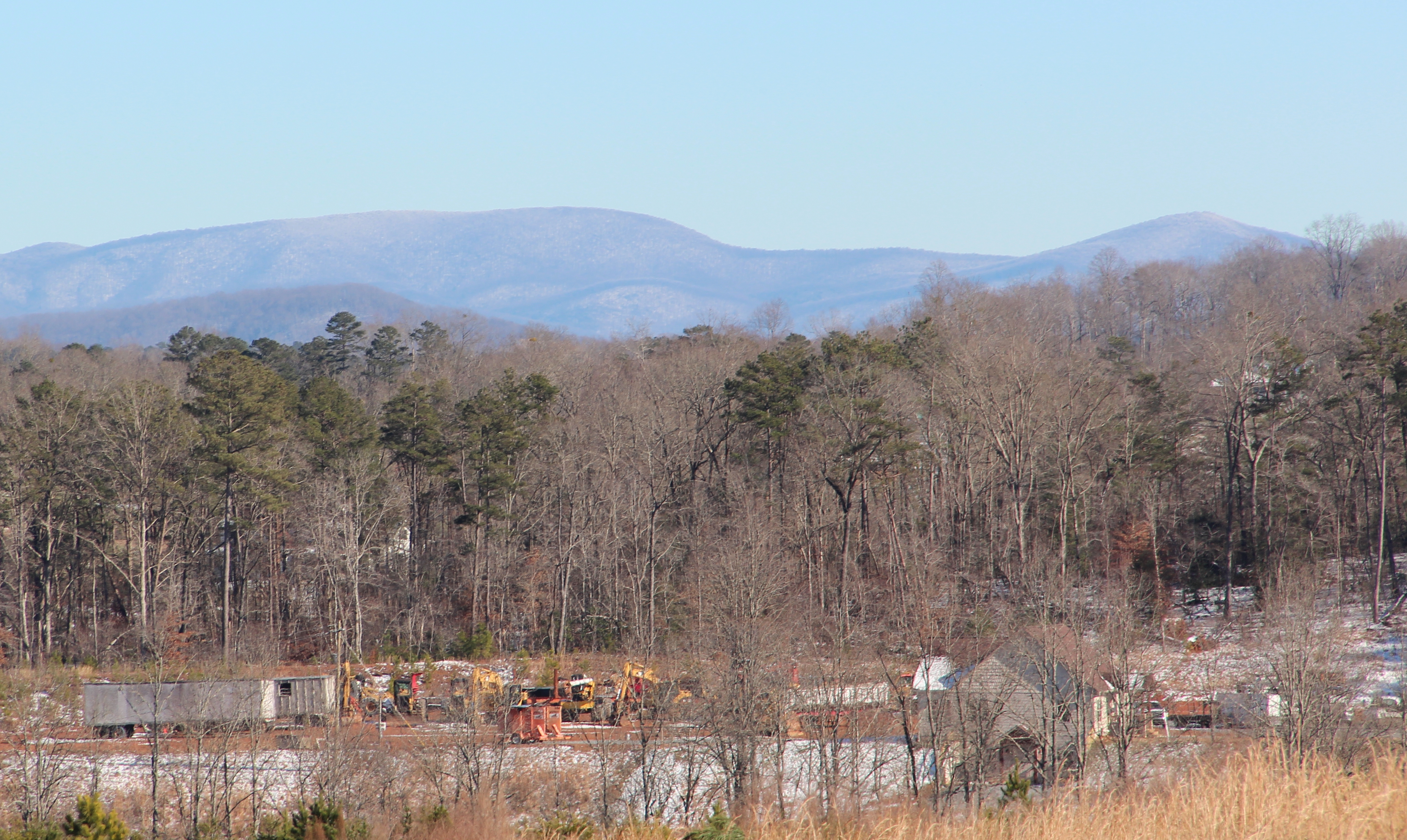
Springer Mountain (left) and Black Mountain (right) covered in snow. Viewed from East Ellijay

== See also ==
- List of peaks on Appalachian Trail in Georgia
