= Oglethorpe Monument =

Monument in Jasper, Georgia

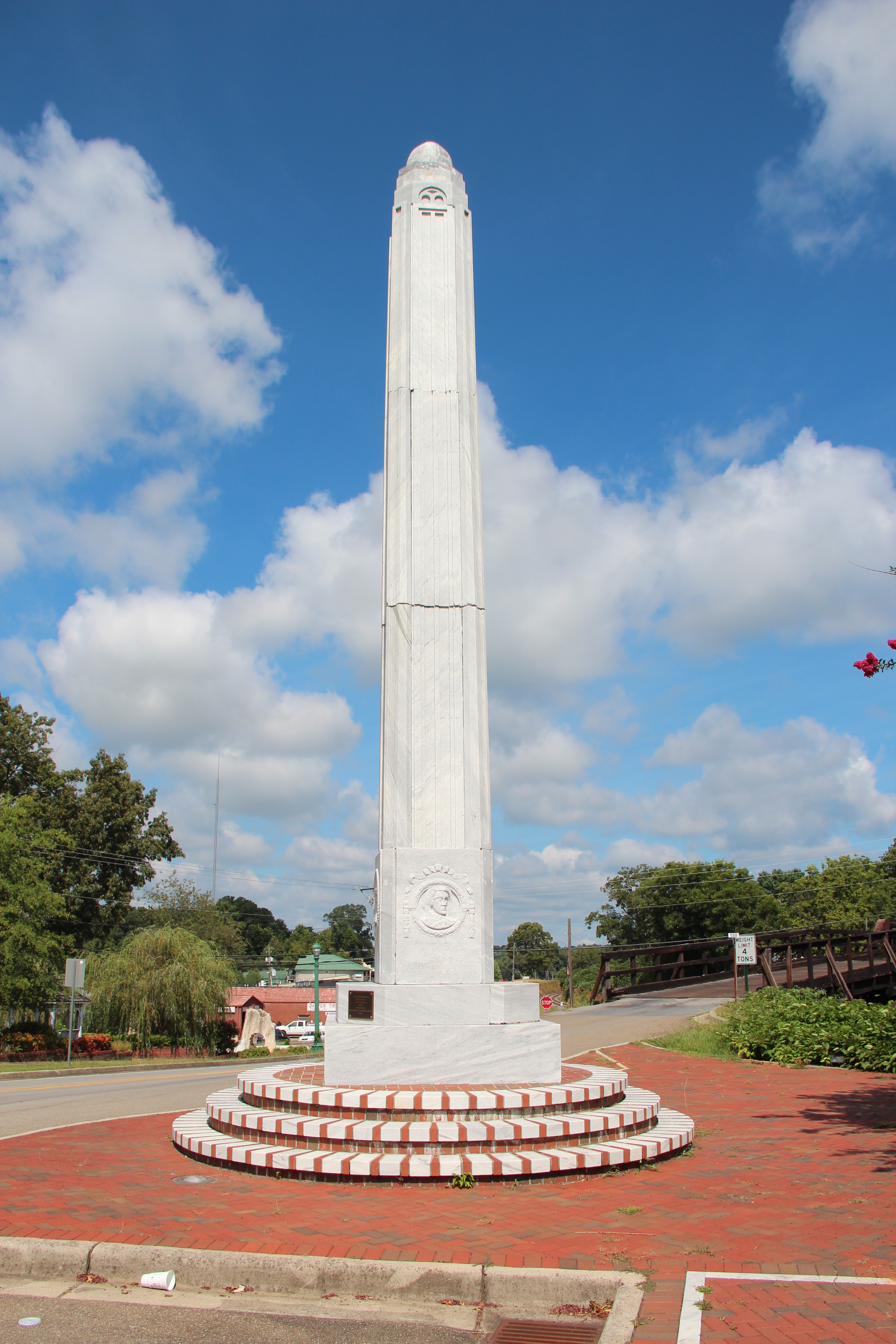
- The monument in 2015
- Interactive map of Oglethorpe Monument
- Location: Jasper, Georgia, United States
- Coordinates: 34°28′12.5″N 84°25′52.5″W
- Designer: Sam Tate
- Builder: James Watt
- Material: Marble
- Height: 38 feet (12 m)
- Dedicated date: 1930
- Dedicated to: James Oglethorpe

The Oglethorpe Monument is a marble obelisk in Jasper, Georgia, United States. Designed by Sam Tate and built by James Watt, it was dedicated in 1930 in honor of James Oglethorpe, the founder of the Province of Georgia. It was originally located at Mount Oglethorpe but was restored and relocated to its current location on Main Street in 1999. In 2026, the monument was severely damaged during a thunderstorm.

== History ==
The monument consists of a 38-foot (12-meter) marble shaft. It was designed by Sam Tate of the Georgia Marble Company as a memorial for James Oglethorpe, the founder of the Province of Georgia. Sculptor James Watt created the monument, using marble quarried from Cherokee County, Georgia. It was originally located on Mount Oglethorpe and dedicated in 1930, at which time the mountain was the southern terminus for the Appalachian Trail. The ceremony was attended by several famous individuals, including the governor of Georgia, Lamartine Griffin Hardman. In 1999, the monument underwent a restoration and relocation to its present location in Jasper, Georgia, roughly 10 miles (16 kilometers) west. The project was undertaken jointly by the city government of Jasper and the Georgia Historical Society. It is currently located at the intersection of Chambers Street and North Main Street. In 2001, the Georgia Historical Society erected a historical marker near the monument.

In July 2026, the monument was severely damaged during a thunderstorm, with chunks of marble being separated from the structure and scattered around the nearby streets. Several reports said that the monument was apparently struck by lightning. Following this, the city government reached out to the Blue Ridge Marble & Granite Company to assess damages. Speaking about the damage, Jasper Mayor Kirk Raffield said, "This is part of our identity. This moment has not always been here. It was moved in the late 90s to downtown, but for those of us that live here in Jasper, this is quickly become part of our identity, and it's also part of our history. So, for us, it's integral that we get this rehabbed."

== See also ==
- 1930 in art
