= Amicalola Falls State Park =

State park in Georgia, United States

Amicalola Falls State Park & Lodge
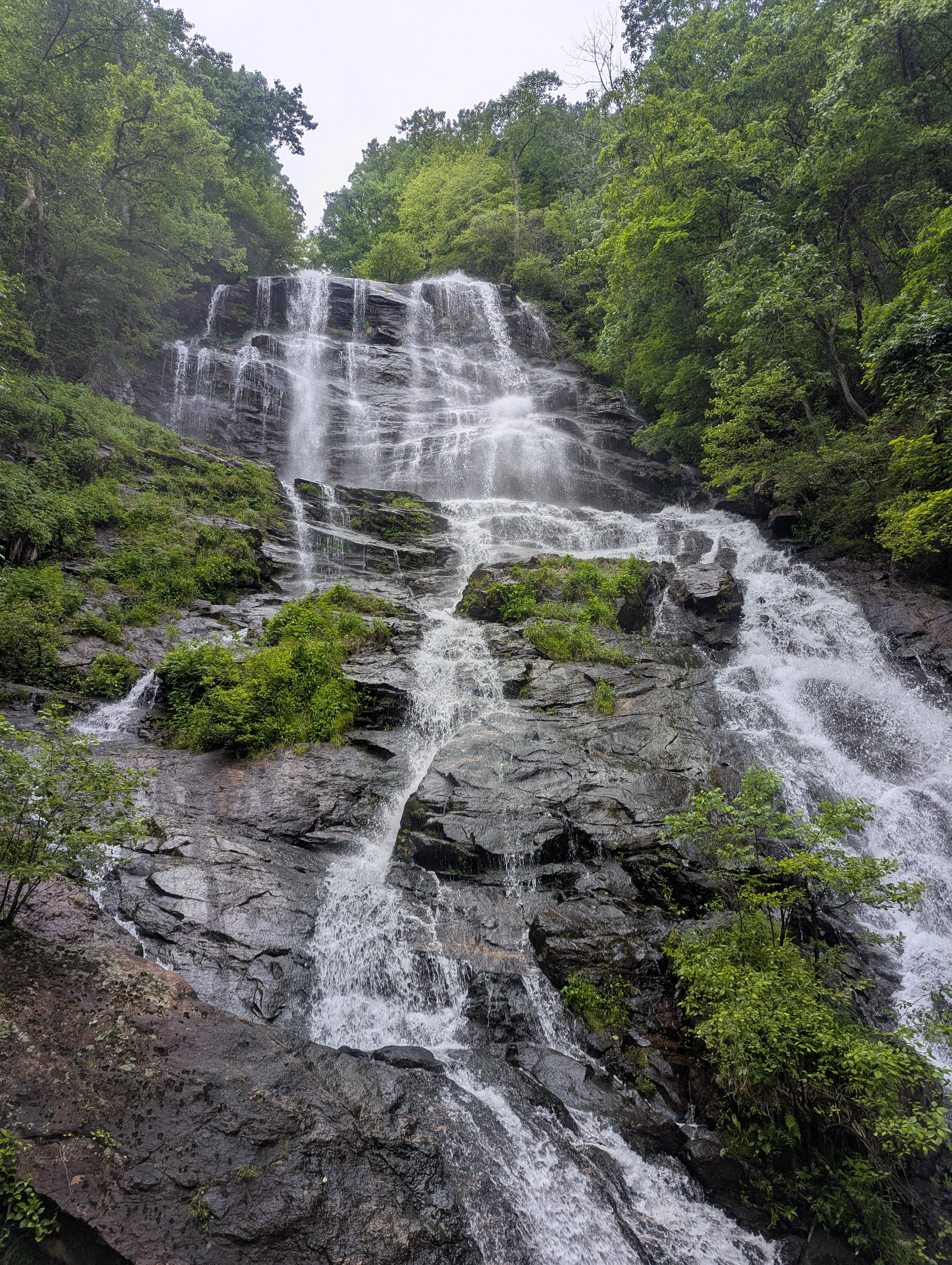
- Amicalola Falls in 2025

- Location within Georgia Location within the United States
- Location: Dawson County, Georgia, USA
- Nearest city: Dawsonville, Georgia
- Coordinates: 34°33′58″N 84°14′31″W
- Area: 829 acres (3.35 km^{2}; 1.30 sq mi)
- Governing body: Georgia State Park
- Website: Official website

Amicalola Falls State Park & Lodge is an 829-acre (3.35 km^{2}) Georgia state park located between Ellijay and Dahlonega in Dawsonville, Georgia. The park's name is derived from a Cherokee language word meaning "tumbling waters". The park is home to Amicalola Falls, a 729-foot (222 m) waterfall that is the highest in Georgia. However, an analysis conducted by the World Waterfall Data base suggests that the main part of the falls is 429 feet (131 m) in height, followed by a prolonged gently sloping run in which the flow drops another 279 feet (85 m). It is considered to be one of the Seven Natural Wonders of Georgia. An 8-mile (13 km) trail that winds past Amicalola Falls and leads to Springer Mountain, famous as the southern terminus of the Appalachian Trail, begins in the park. Amicalola Falls State Park also offers many hiking trails, a guest lodge, restaurant, cabins, a shelter for long-distance Appalachian Trail hikers, a campground, and access to the eco-friendly Len Foote Hike Inn.

== History ==
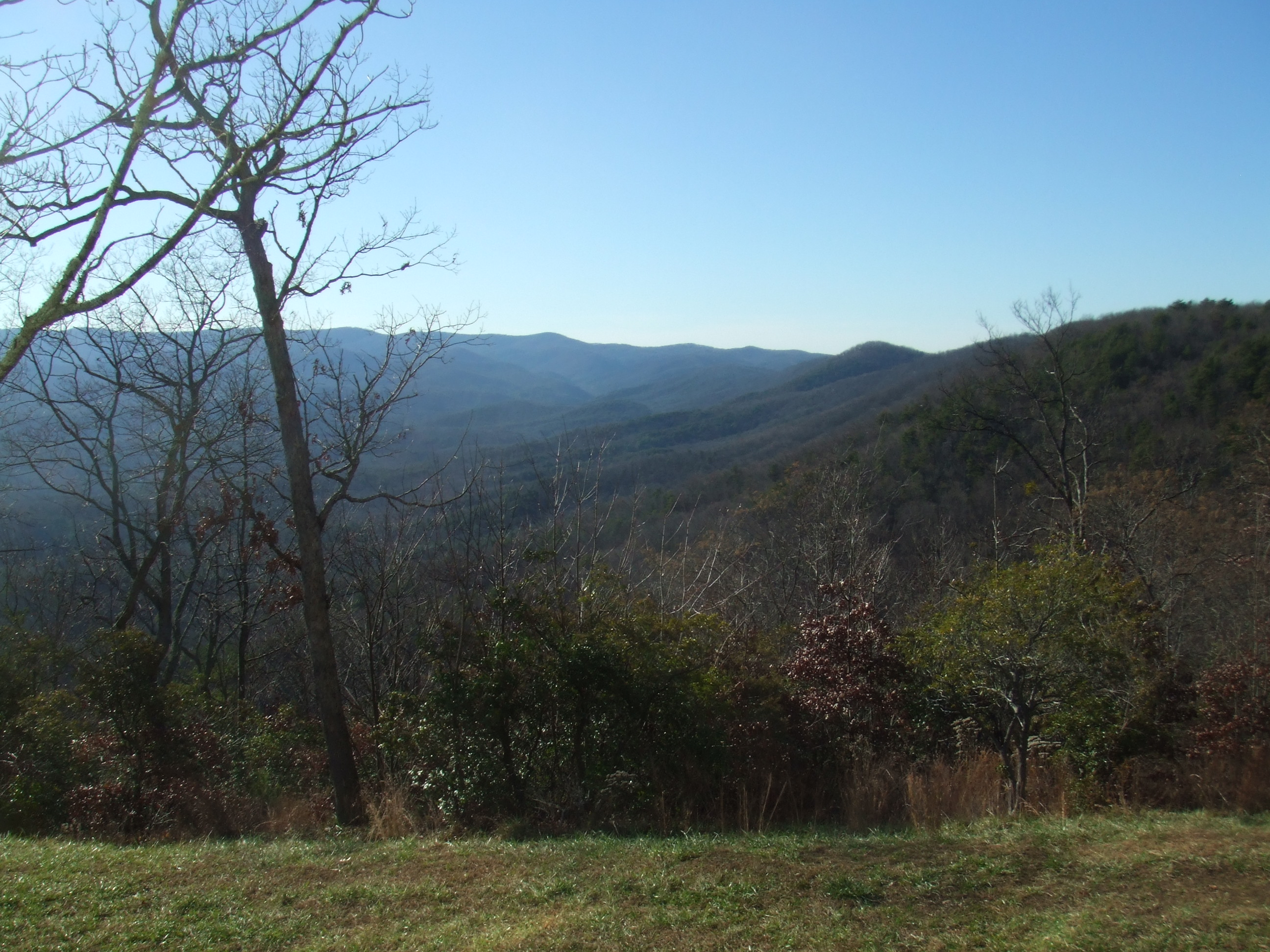
View from the Amicalola Falls State Park Lodge

Little was known by European Americans about the falls before the 19th century. Until 1832, the Cherokee, an Iroquoian-speaking tribe believed to have migrated in ancient times from the Great Lakes region, controlled a large territory that included this area of the state park. That year they signed the Treaty of New Echota with the United States, which forced the Cherokee to remove into the Ozarks in Indian Territory west of the Mississippi River. They called their mass removal and overland journey the Trail of Tears, during which many people died of the thousands traveling. Nearby settlers knew a Cherokee woman who lived in the area until the 1850s; she refused to leave when her tribe was removed.

The first written account of the falls was by William Williamson, who was exploring the area seeking land to claim in the Sixth Georgia Land Lottery. Williamson wrote:

In the course of my route in the Mountains I discovered a Water Fall perhaps the greatest in the World the most majestic Scene that I have ever witnessed or heard of the Creek passes over the mountain & the fall I think can't be less than Six hundred Yards. The Mountain is at least three fourths of a mile high. I made great exertions to get on the summit, but the ascent was so great that I was completely exhausted by the time I reached half way. My position was such that I had a perfect view of the entire Fall The Steam is Called Um-ma-eolola from the Fall (Tumbling Waters).

An unknown settler was given this land after the lottery. He decided not to live on it because the terrain proved to be too rugged. The state purchased the falls in 1911. Amicalola Falls State Park was not developed at all until the Georgia Appalachian Trail Club decided in 1958 that they would move the southern terminus of the Appalachian Trail from Mount Oglethorpe to the nearby Springer Mountain. An 8.5-mile-long (13.7 km) trail was blazed from the base of Amicalola Falls to the top of Springer Mountain, so that Appalachian Trail hikers would be able to access the trail from a major highway.

== Today ==
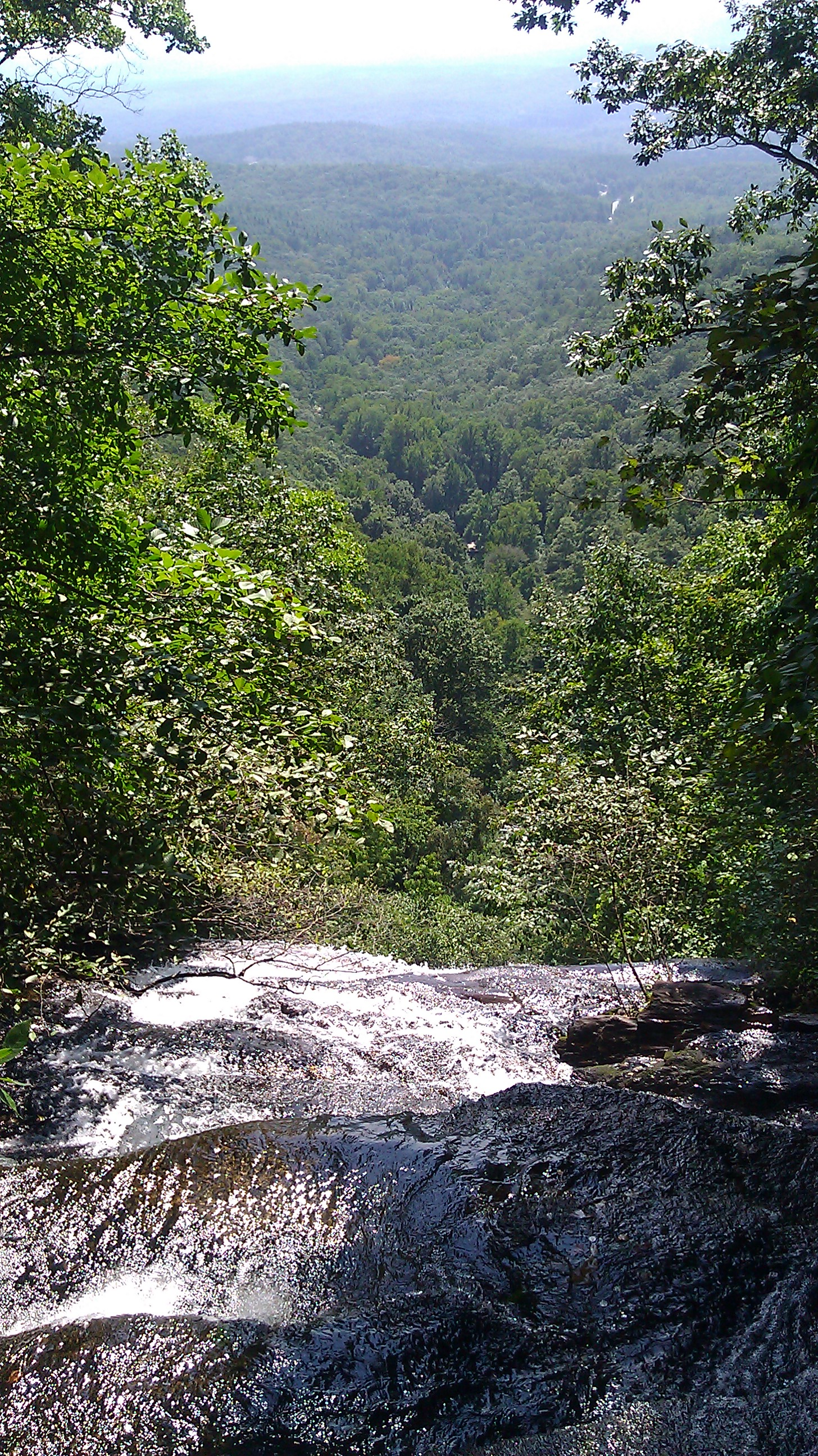
View from the top of the falls

Amicalola Falls State Park & Lodge has four groups of trails within it, including the trail leading up to the top of the waterfall. The park has a lodge that serves as a starting point for Appalachian Trail hikers. The park also checks in guests for a nearby facility called the Len Foote Hike Inn, a backcountry eco-friendly inn that is 5 miles from the park, one mile from the Appalachian Approach trail and 4.4 miles from Springer Mountain.

In 2012, Amicalola Falls State Park was privatized and its operations transferred to Coral Hospitality, a Florida-based hotel and resort management company.

== Gallery ==
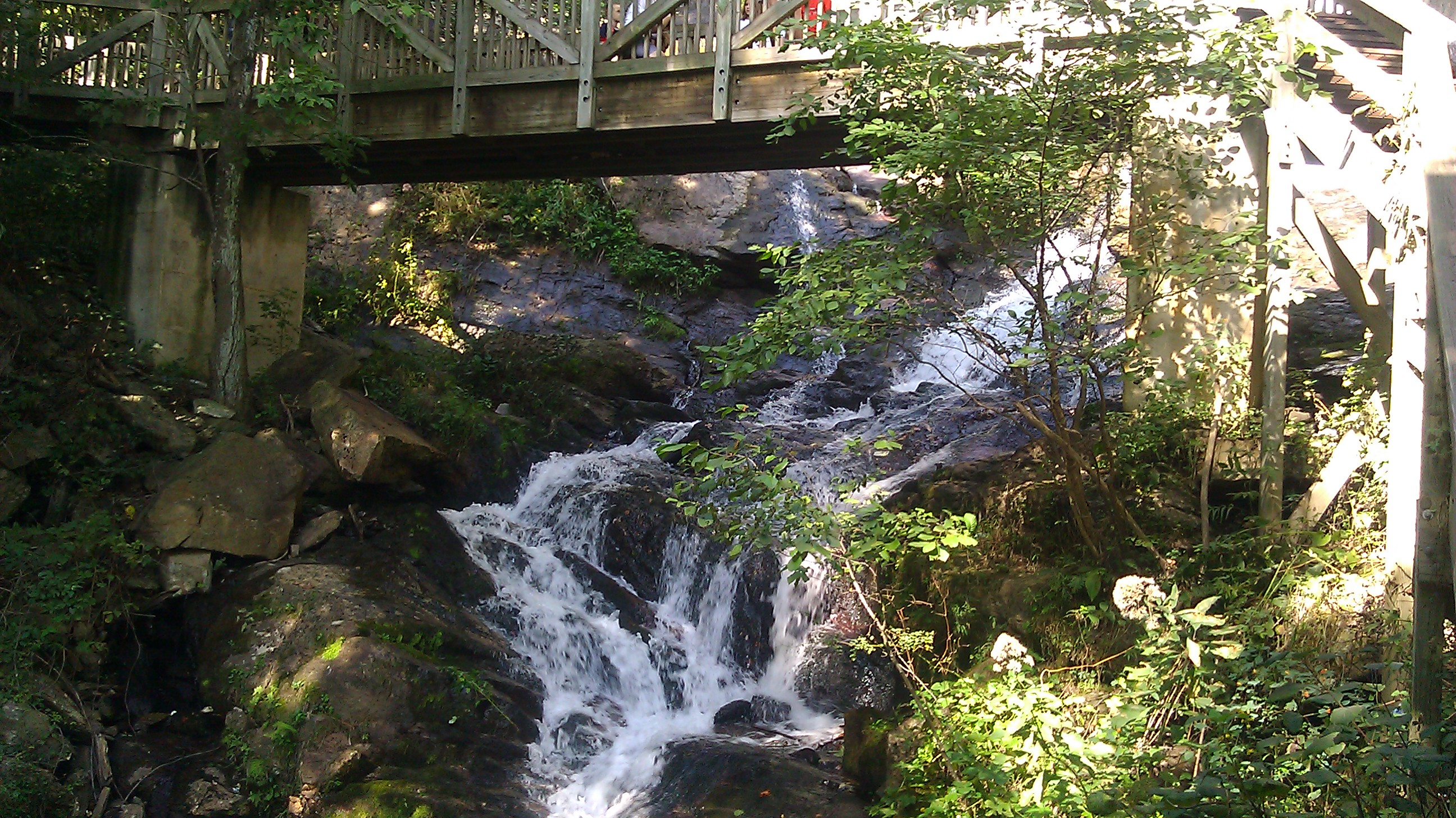
Lower cascades

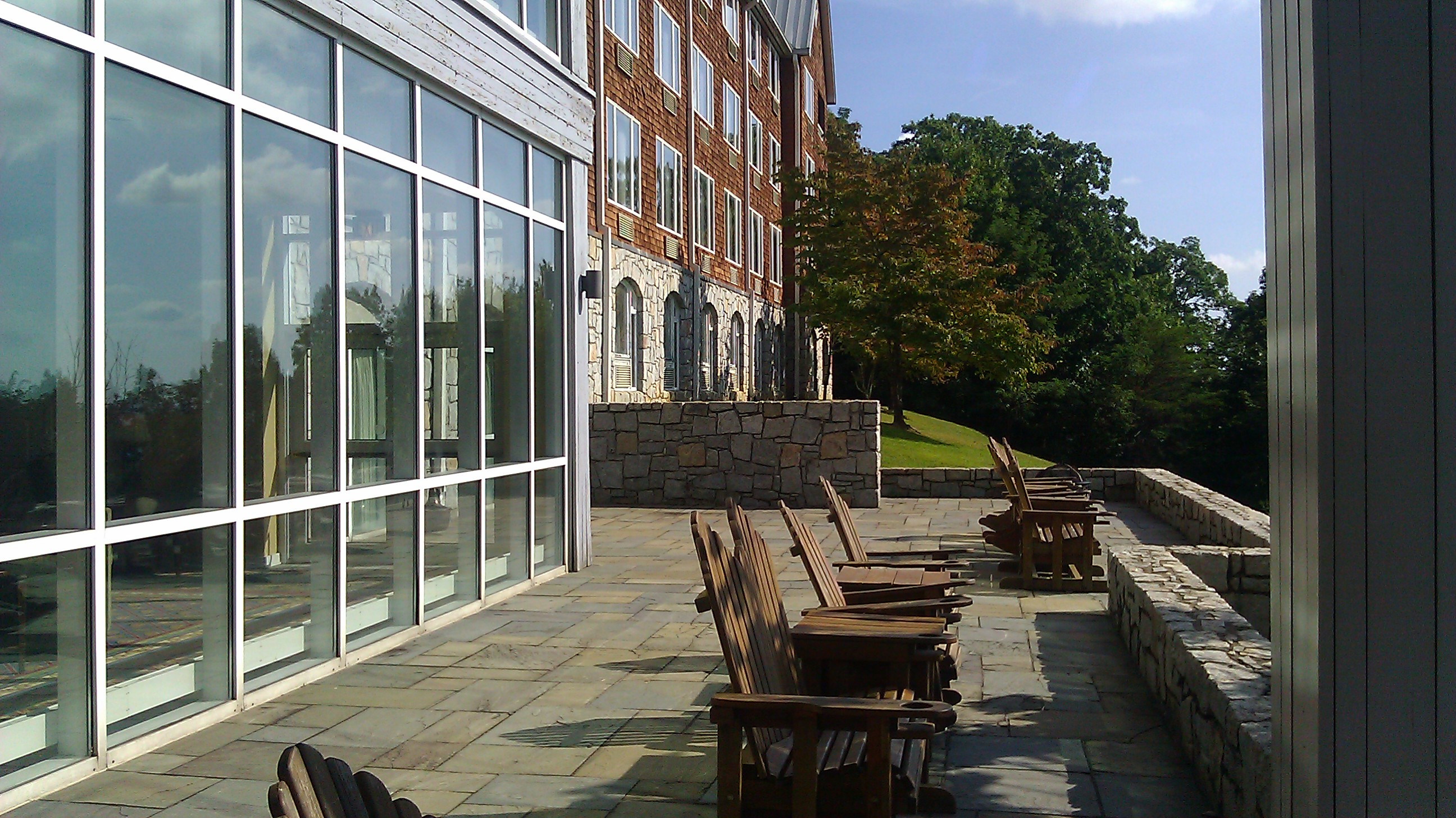
Amicalola Falls State Park Lodge

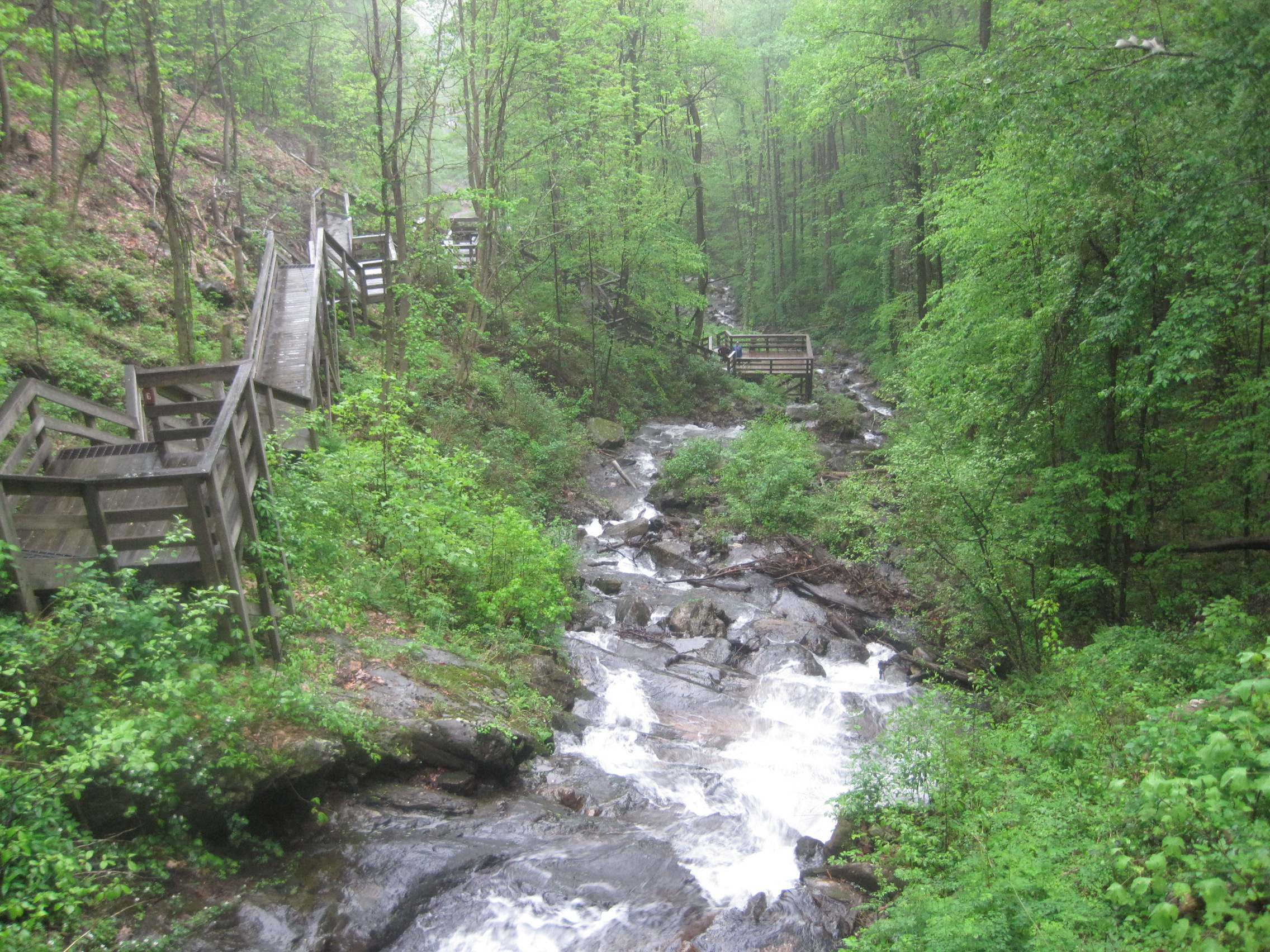
View looking downward showing the stairs of the trail alongside of the waterfall

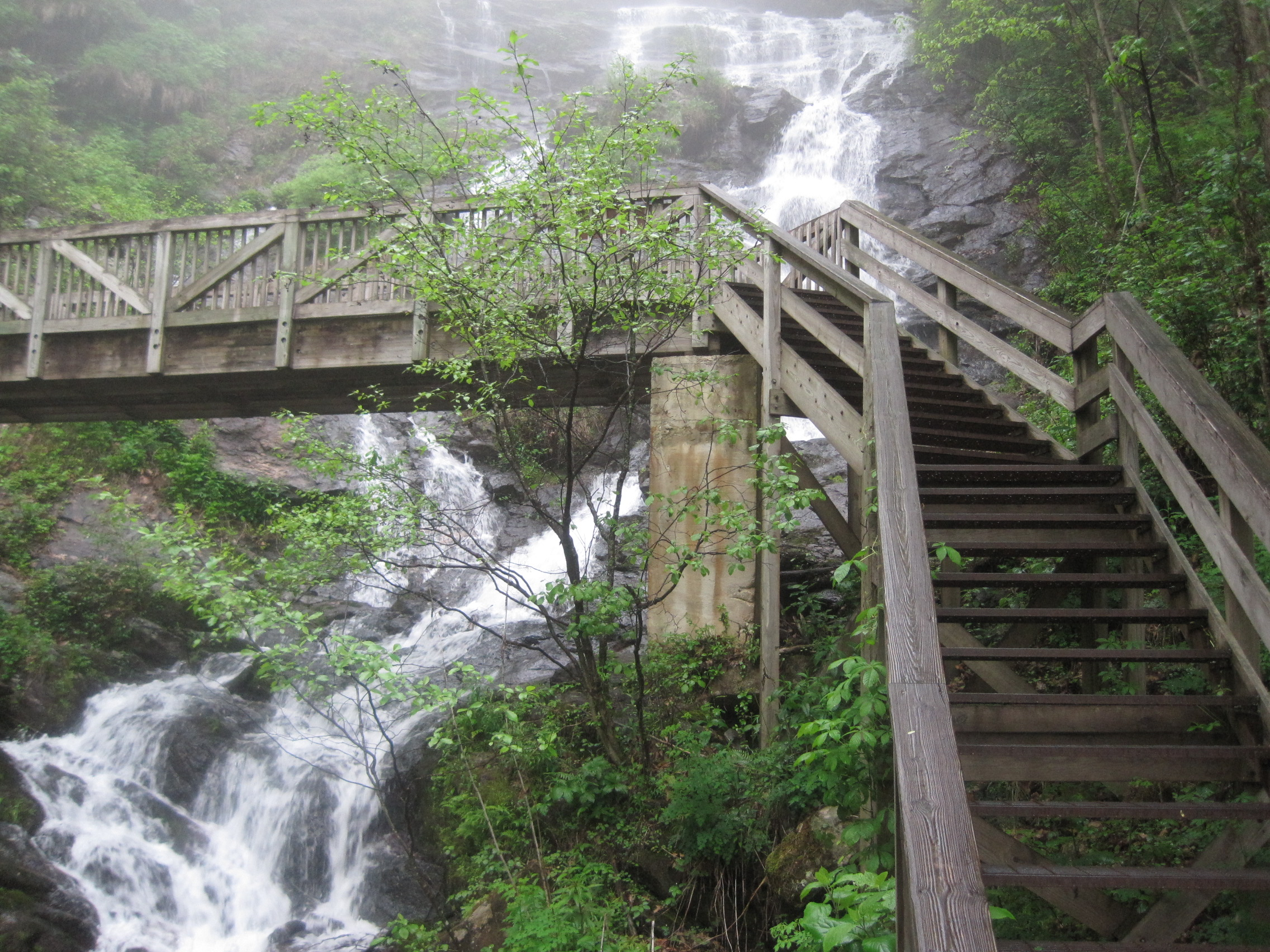
Series of stairs to an observation overlook

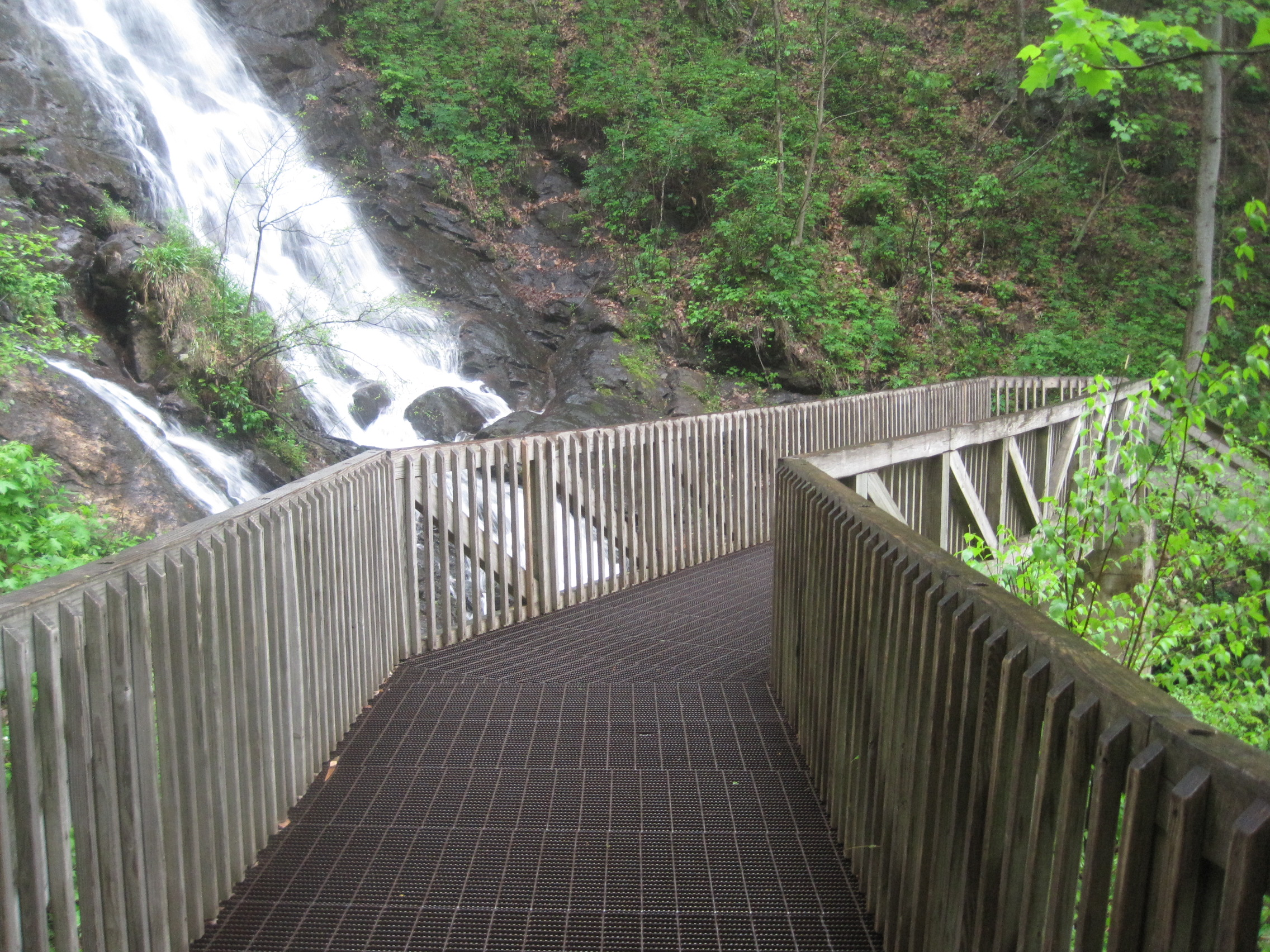
An observation bridge spans across the waterfall
