= Ed Jenkins National Recreation Area =

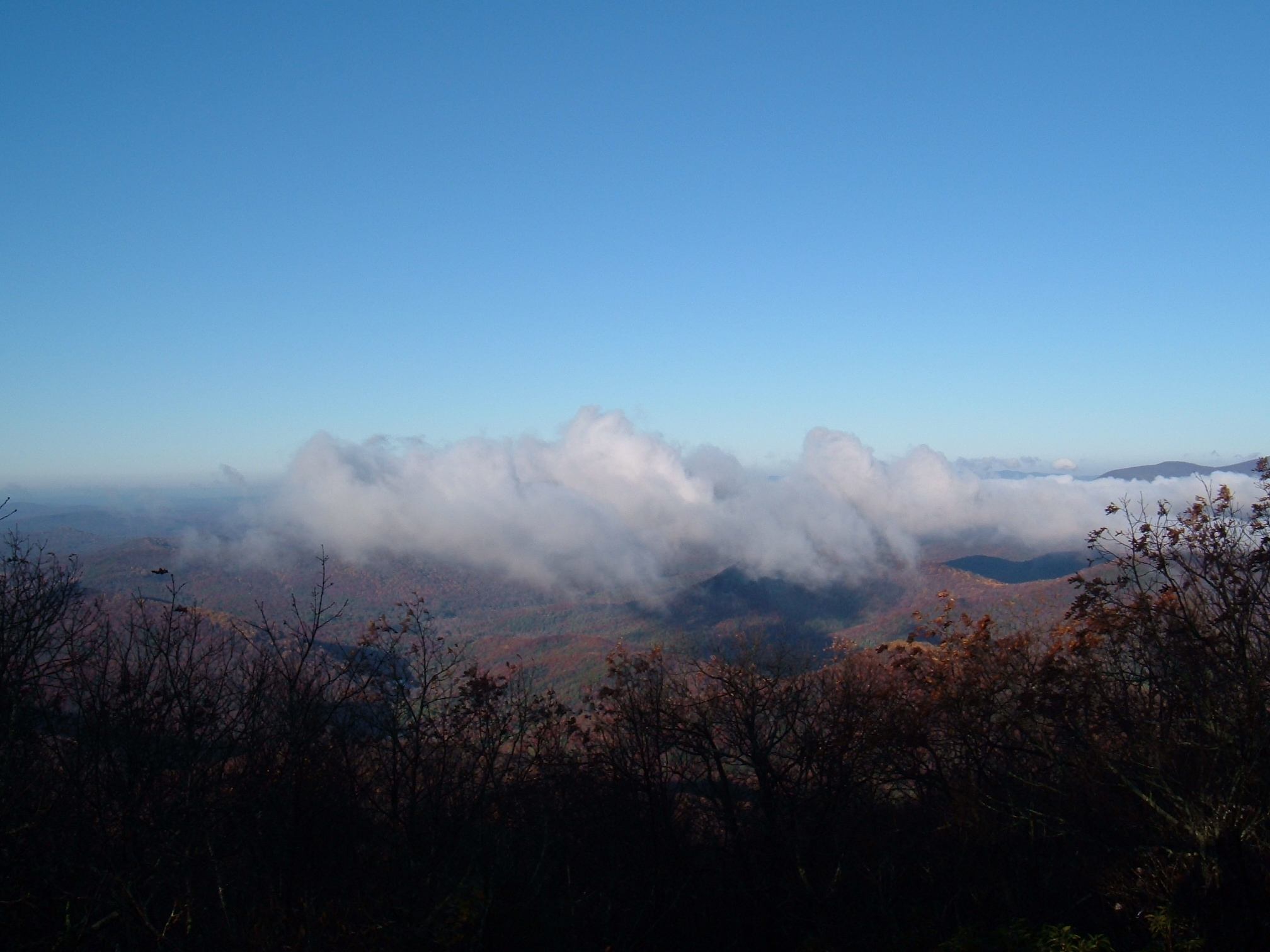
- View from Springer Mountain

- Location within Georgia Location within the United States
- Location: Fannin and Union counties, Georgia, United States
- Nearest city: Morganton, Georgia
- Coordinates: 34.63333°N 84.2°W
- Area: 23,330 acres (94.4 km^{2})
- Established: 1991
- Governing body: United States Forest Service

Ed Jenkins National Recreation Area, originally designated as Springer Mountain National Recreation Area, is a national recreation area in Fannin and Union counties in the U.S. state of Georgia. It was established in Chattahoochee-Oconee National Forest in 1991 by Pub. L. 102–207 and renamed the following year by Pub. L. 102–456. It is administered by the U.S. Forest Service and contains approximately 23,330 acres (9,440 ha). Springer Mountain, near the center of the recreation area, is the southern terminus of the Appalachian Trail.
