= Big Canoe, Georgia =

Gated community in Georgia, U.S.

Coordinates: 34°27′28.11″N 84°17′29.02″W

Big Canoe (//) is a mountain community, consisting of over 8,000 acres (32 km^{2}), located at the southern terminus of the Blue Ridge Mountains, adjacent to Mount Oglethorpe, approximately 50 miles north of Atlanta, Georgia, United States.

It straddles both Pickens County and Dawson County between the towns of Jasper and Dawsonville and has about 3,000 residents. Approximately 60% are full-time and 40% are part-time or vacation homeowners.

== History ==
=== Tate family ===
In the 1830s, Samuel Tate, the owner of a hotel on Federal Road, discovered marble on his property and began buying up the surrounding land through the land lottery. In 1850, he entered a partnership which opened a quarry near the present-day town of Tate.

By 1880, the Georgia marble industry was suffering. However, the construction of the Marietta and North Georgia Railway allowed the stone to reach new markets, and the Tate family founded the Georgia Marble Company in 1884 in response to growing business and newly interested investors. In 1905, Tate's grandson, Colonel Sam Tate, became president and general manager of the company, and oversaw a period of dramatic growth and profit.

Colonel Tate was responsible for bringing numerous improvements to the area, including Wolfscratch School. The school was established and operated in the building now housing the Big Canoe tennis pro shop. Two large chimneys standing next to the real estate office are all that is left of a house built in 1913 for the school's principal and teachers. As other educational alternatives became available, the school was eventually closed. The house with the two chimneys became the primary residence of Steve and Lucille Tate until it burned down in 1959.

=== Development ===
Following the death of Steve Tate, the Wolfscratch property was sold. It lay unused for a number of years, until Cousins Properties in Atlanta and the Sea Pines Corporation of Hilton Head partnered to create the community of Big Canoe in 1972.

Fifteen years later, in 1987, the Byrne Corporation assumed responsibility for developing and marketing the community, until 1997, when it merged with Greenwood Development Corporation as Big Canoe Company, LLC.

== Geography ==
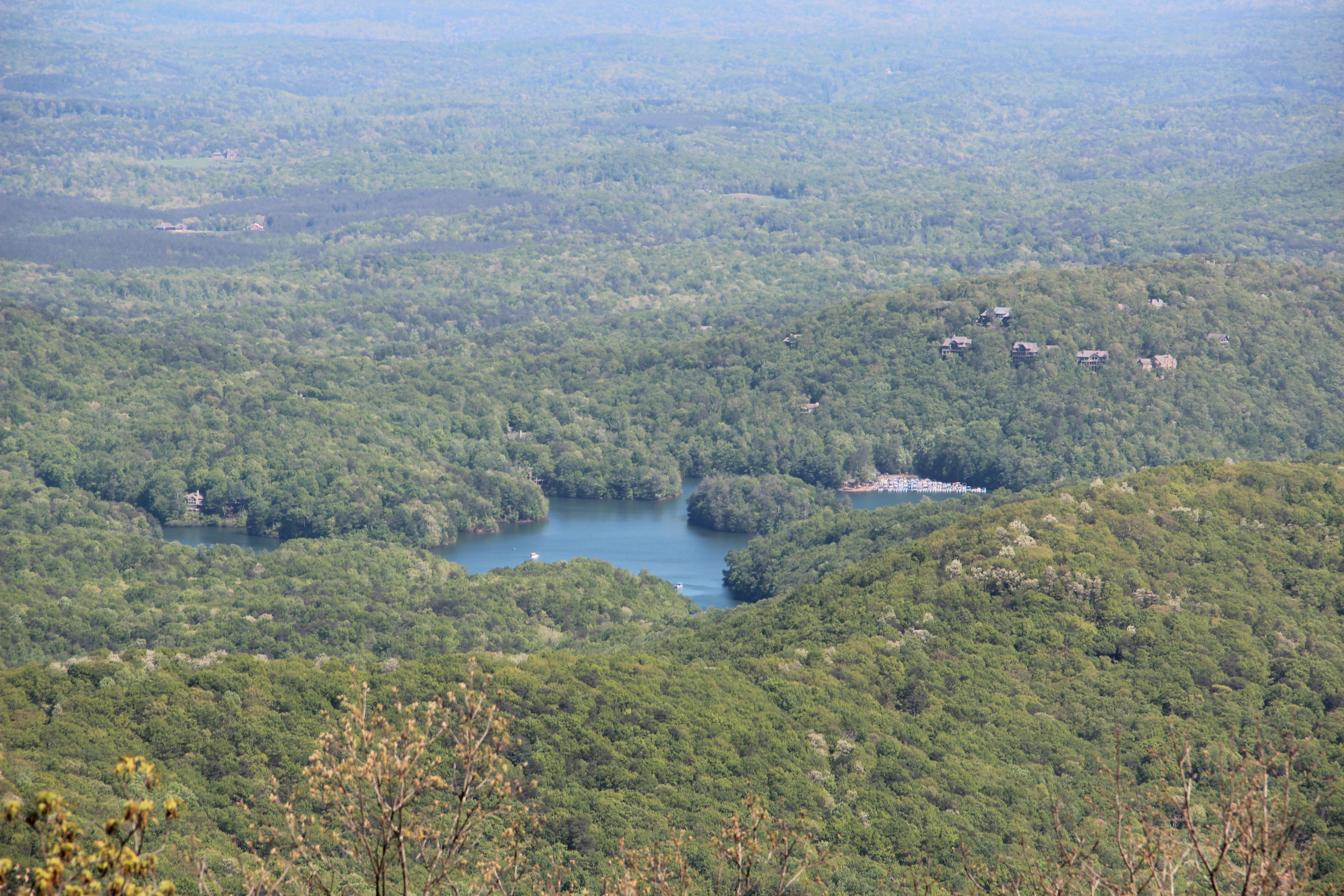
Lake Petit, viewed from Mount Oglethorpe

The community covers over 8,000 acres (32 km^{2}) in both Dawson and Pickens counties. It includes three man-made lakes: Petit, Sconti, and Disharoon. Lake Petit, the largest, supplies the community's drinking water.

Nearly one-third of the total property has been set aside as wildlife areas and parks.
