= Georgia Appalachian Trail Club =

U.S. non-profit organization

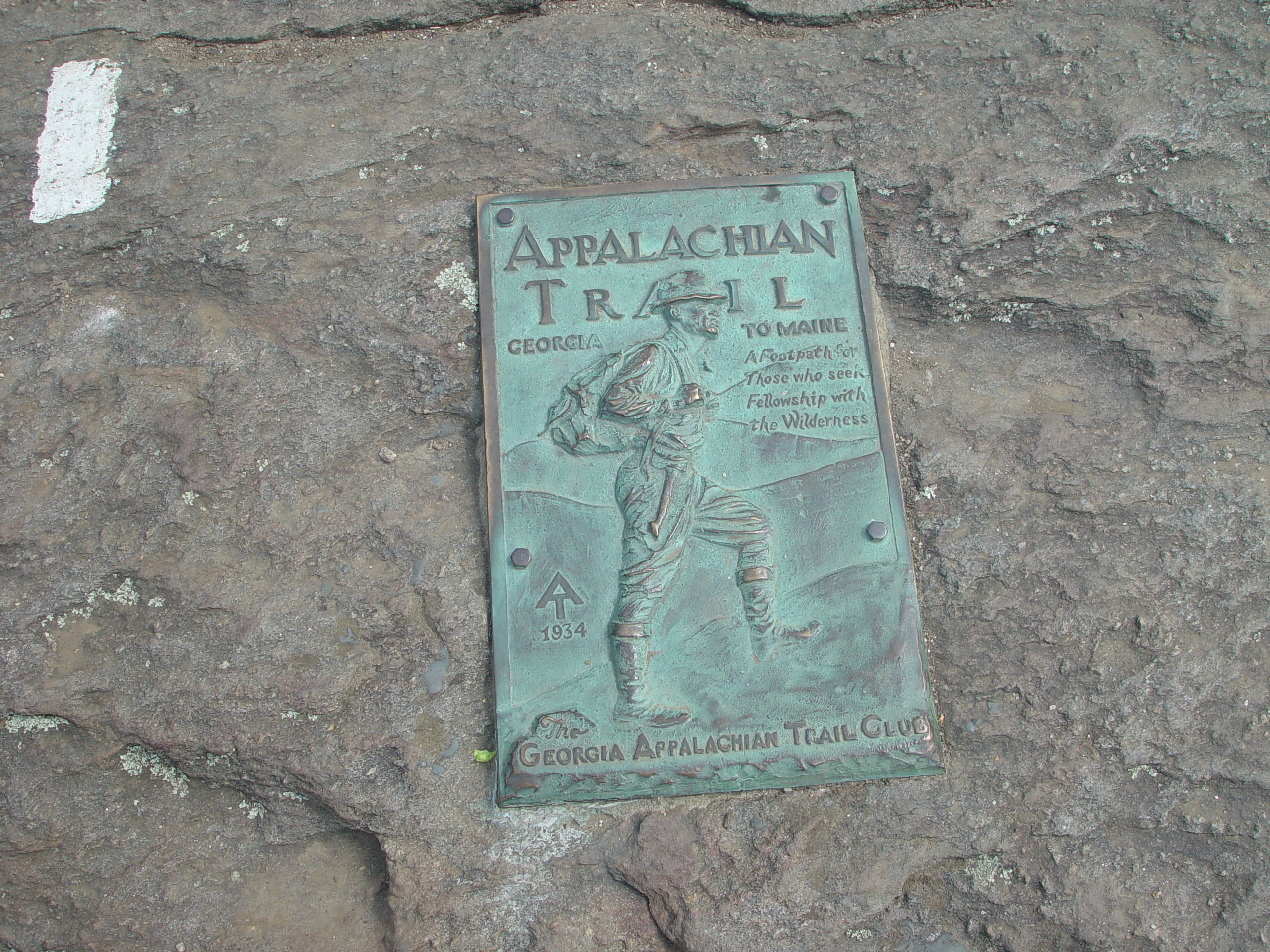

The Georgia Appalachian Trail Club (GATC) is a non-profit organization that was organized in 1930 in Dahlonega, Georgia. Its membership consists of individual volunteers who share a love for the Appalachian Trail.

The GATC is responsible for the management and maintenance of the Appalachian Trail in Georgia. This is accomplished through cooperation with the Appalachian Trail Conservancy and the U.S. Forest Service.

The GATC is active in the conservation community on issues relating to the protection of the Appalachian Trail. It also conducts a wide range of outdoor recreational events for its membership.

== See also ==
- List of peaks on the Appalachian Trail in Georgia
