= Amicalola =

Amicalola may refer to:

- Amicalola, Georgia, unincorporated community
- Amicalola Creek
- Amicalola Falls, waterfall in Dawson County, Georgia
