= Dawson Forest =

Forest in Dawson County, Georgia, U.S.

Coordinates: 34.378166°N 84.166512°W

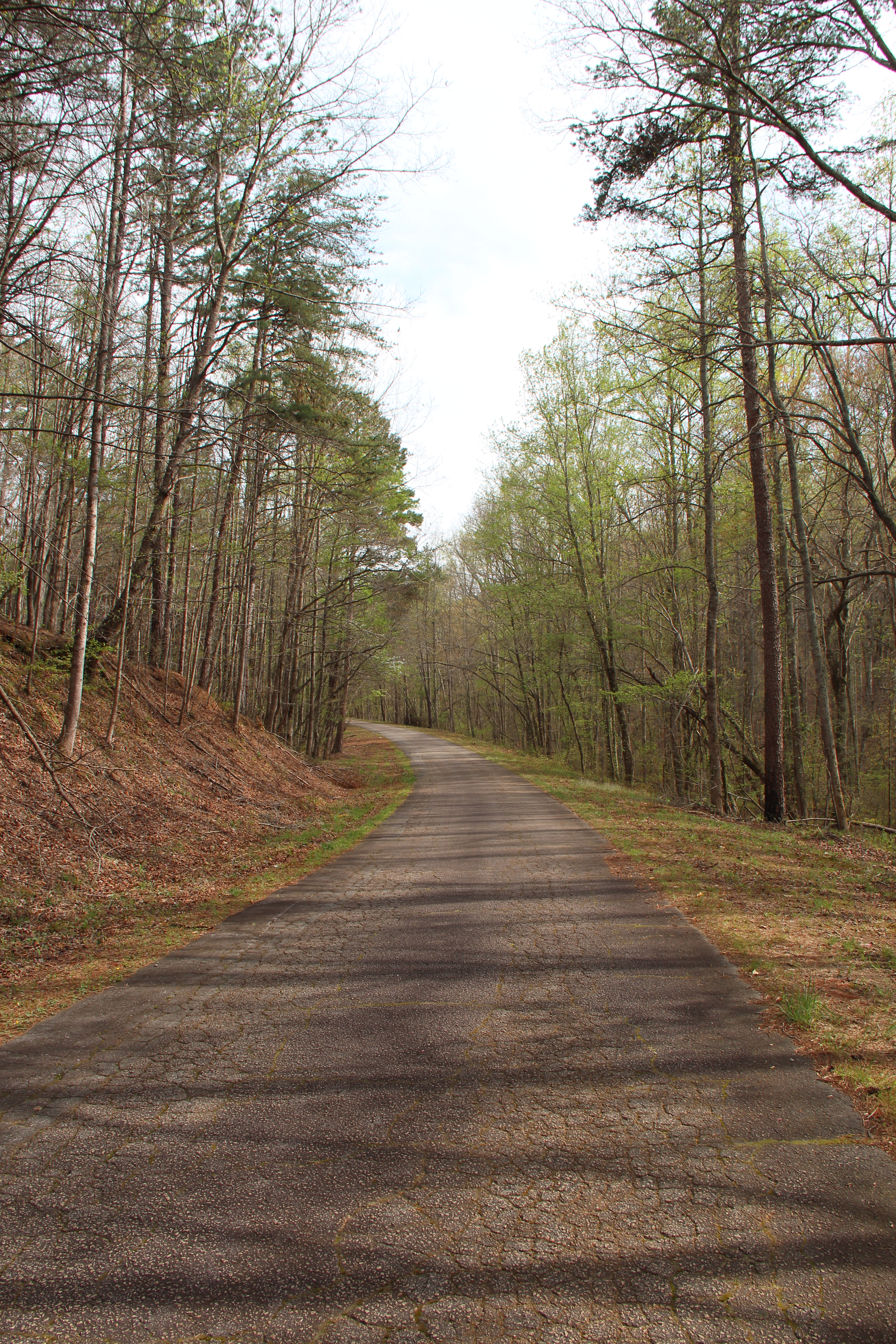
Road inside Dawson Forest

Dawson Forest (City of Atlanta Tract) is a 10,130-acre (41.0 km^{2}) public-use forest located in Dawson County, Georgia, southwest of Dawsonville. It is owned by the city of Atlanta, but is considered a state forest, as it is managed by the Georgia Forestry Commission.

It was purchased in 1971 from Lockheed, and was the previous site of the Georgia Nuclear Aircraft Laboratory (GNAL). The property is currently referred to as the Dawson Forest City of Atlanta Tract and managed by the Georgia Forestry Commission with a trail system open to the public. The tract is located approximately ten miles from the end of limited access on Georgia 400 in Cumming. An area of 3 acres (12,000 m^{2}) previously occupied by GNAL was restricted following 1978 testing which found residual nuclear radiation from the experiments performed there. Subsequent studies in 1991 and 1997 found radiation levels to be at or slightly above normal background radiation levels. The property also encompasses Amicalola Creek, which various groups are lobbying to be designated as a scenic river, and which flows over Amicalola Falls within Amicalola Falls State Park.

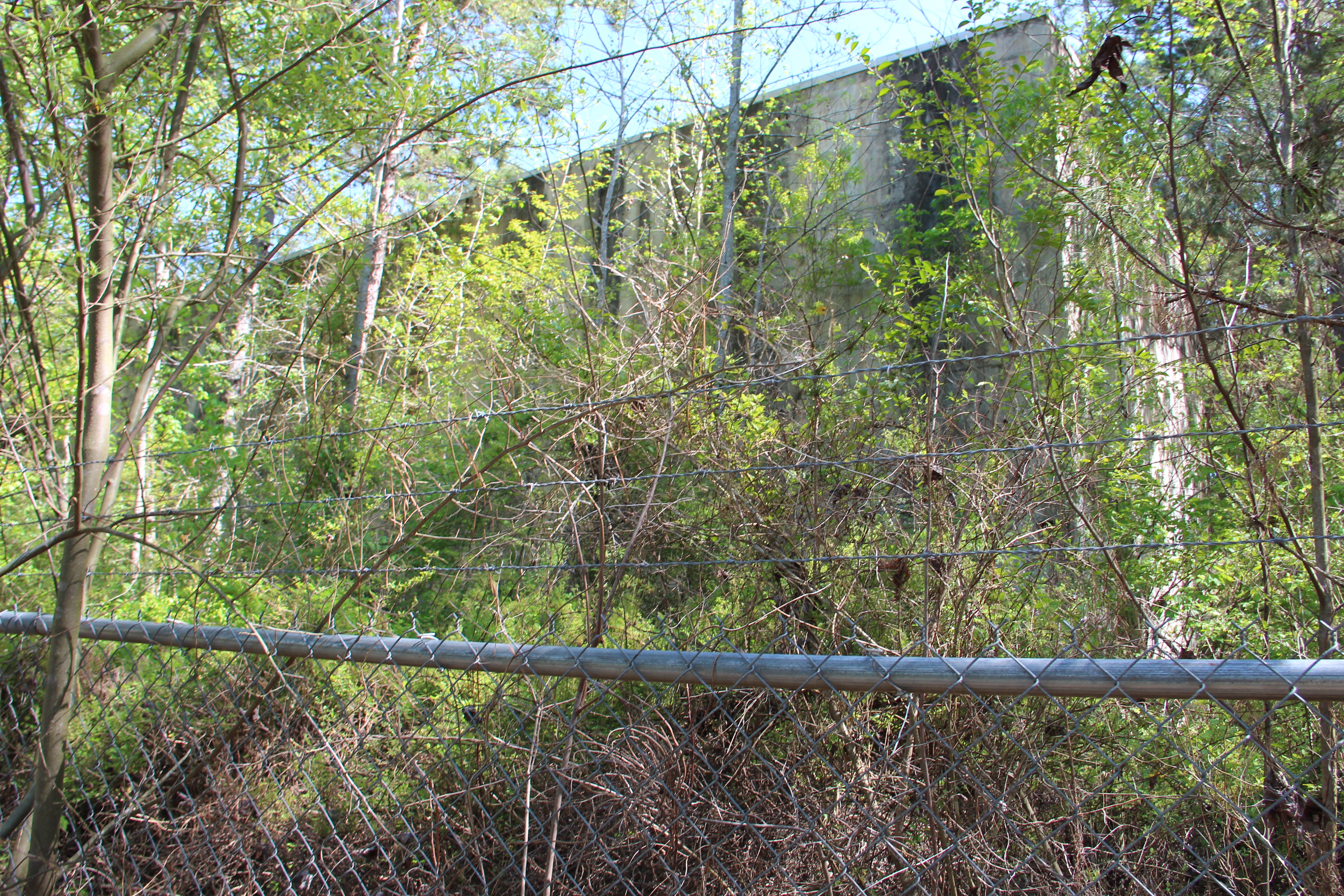
Building where remains from testing lie.

It was intended and retained by the city as a potential site for Atlanta's second airport, however in late summer 2009 it was made known that part may be used for the Shoal Creek Reservoir, a reservoir that would send water mainly to the city of Atlanta system, at its water works in Sandy Springs. However, this 38-mile (61 km) pipeline would result in an interbasin transfer from the Etowah River to the Chattahoochee River, which is currently prohibited by the metro Atlanta water district, and would leave less water in Lake Allatoona. Additionally, Alabama has sued to stop nearly everything Georgia has tried to do with the upstream water supply, including the Hickory Log Creek reservoir. In 2009, it was estimated that these lawsuits prevented permitting and construction that would take only four years. The lake would be 2,000 acres (8.1 km^{2}), leaving the remainder as forest.

== History ==
Dawson Forest started life as a testing facility for the Lockheed Martin Corporation in the 1960s. This area was used to test the development of the Nuclear-powered aircraft, and later used simply for open air testing to determine the effects of Ionizing radiation on various items. In 1971, the land was purchased by the City of Atlanta for use as an alternative airport to Hartsfield–Jackson Atlanta International Airport.
