= Atlanta's proposed second airport =

Proposed idea for Georgia, US

Atlanta's second airport was an idea being studied by the city of Atlanta, Georgia, United States.

== Studies ==
In May 2007, the Federal Aviation Administration (FAA) released the report, Capacity Needs in the National Airspace System, 2007–2025, as part of its Future Airport Capacity Task (FACT2). The report identified Hartsfield–Jackson Atlanta International Airport and the Atlanta metropolitan area as needing additional capacity by 2025. Following the report release, Atlanta was given a $1 million federal grant to study the possibility of adding another airport.

Both Atlanta and Delta Air Lines, which operates its primary hub at Hartsfield–Jackson, expressed skepticism about building a second airport because it would be expensive and an economic failure, according to Delta.

In 2011, the Atlanta Metropolitan Aviation Capacity Study, Phase II, was completed by the FAA, the City of Atlanta and a consulting team. The study concluded that Dobbins Air Reserve Base was the best site from a market potential and development cost perspective, but the airspace and environmental aspects were problematic. The second best possible site was Cobb County Airport due to its accessibility, yet the high development costs were prohibitive.

In 2014, Hartsfield–Jackson Atlanta International Airport unveiled its 20-year Master Expansion Plan to adequately cover the air travel capacity needs in the Atlanta area through 2035.

== Alternatives ==
An additional commercial airport for the Atlanta metropolitan area could be created by expansion of an existing general aviation airport, by conversion of an Air Force base, or by new construction on a greenfield site.

=== Silver Comet Field at Paulding Northwest Atlanta Airport ===
In 1975, in anticipation of a second airport, the City of Atlanta purchased 10,165 acres (4,114 ha) of land west of the city in Paulding County for $925 per acre ($2,290/ha). In early 2007, Paulding County purchased 162 acres (66 ha) of the property for a new general aviation airport (opened in 2009 as Paulding County Regional Airport); Atlanta's second commercial airport could still be built on the remaining property. Paulding County is unserved by either rapid transit or freeways.

=== Dawson Forest ===
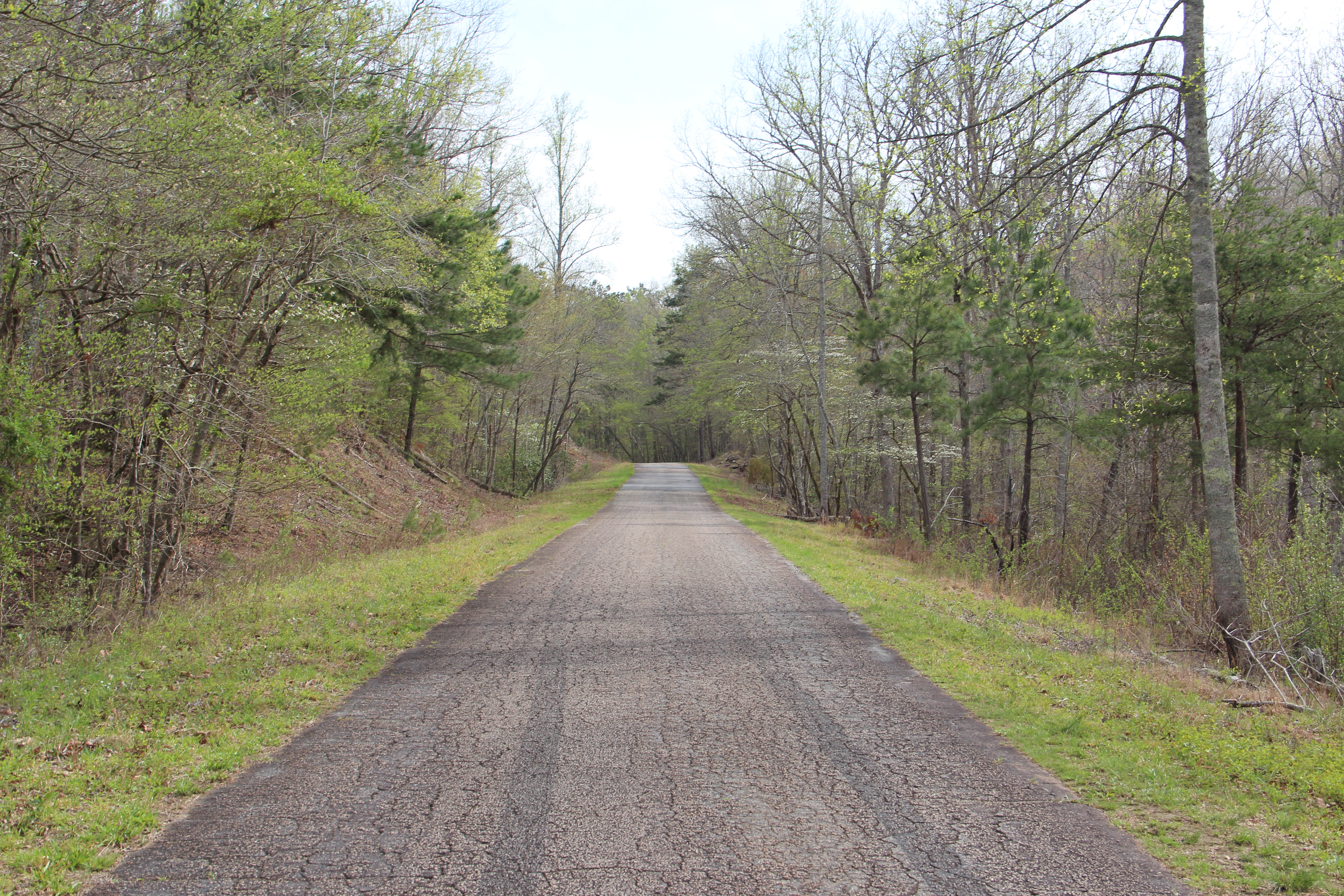
Road in Dawson Forest

The City of Atlanta also owns 10,130 acres (4,100 ha) of land located southwest of Dawsonville, Georgia, which was purchased in 1972 from Lockheed, and was the previous site of the Georgia Nuclear Aircraft Laboratory (GNAL). The property is currently referred to as the Dawson Forest City of Atlanta Tract, and managed by the Georgia Forestry Commission with a trail system open to the public. The tract is located approximately 10 miles (16 km) from the end of limited access on State Route 400 north of Cumming, Georgia. An area of 3 acres (1.2 ha) previously occupied by GNAL was restricted following 1978 testing that found residual nuclear radiation from the experiments performed there. Subsequent studies in 1991 and 1997 found radiation levels to be at or slightly above normal background levels. The property also encompasses Amicalola Creek, which various groups are lobbying to be designated as a scenic river. The forest has also been proposed for use as a major reservoir for the city of Atlanta water system.

=== Chattanooga Metropolitan Airport ===
Chattanooga Metropolitan Airport (CHA) officials and a Georgia state senator have proposed expansion of the airport, located in Chattanooga, Tennessee, as a solution to Atlanta's capacity needs. Sen. Jeff Mullis's idea includes a maglev train to connect Atlanta passengers to CHA. Like the Western and Atlantic Railroad (Georgia's first state railroad), it would be built cooperatively by the state with the help of Tennessee. Chattanooga's airport currently operates at a small portion of its capacity, but additional capacity would be necessary to be Atlanta's second airport. Expansion would be difficult as the property is currently bounded by significant roads, a railroad line and a creek bed.

=== Dobbins Air Reserve Base ===
Dobbins Air Reserve Base, located just northwest of Atlanta along Interstate 75, was originally intended as a second civilian airport prior to World War II. Dobbins would only be available if a future Department of Defense Base Realignment and Closure commission decided to close the base. As of 2015, no additional BRAC closures are planned.

=== Northeast Georgia Regional Airport ===
After the announcement of the second airport study, a long-dormant commission created in 1989 by the Georgia General Assembly in hopes of creating a regional airport to northeast Georgia reconstituted itself. The Northeast Georgia Surface and Air Transportation Commission is now planning to create studies for a 20- or 24-gate airport in the region that could provide relief for Hartsfield, drawing traffic from Atlanta's northeast suburbs. While the earlier incarnation of the commission narrowed options to the expansion of Gwinnett County's Briscoe Field, the Dawson Forest site, and a 10,000-acre (4,000 ha) site in Jackson County, the new version will consider expansion of the Barrow County–based general aviation Northeast Georgia Regional Airport. The facility is extending an existing runway to 7,000 feet (2,100 m) and although it currently occupies only 450 acres (180 ha), there is adjacent undeveloped land for expansion.
