= National Register of Historic Places listings in Dawson County, Georgia =

This is a list of properties and districts in Dawson County, Georgia that are listed on the National Register of Historic Places (NRHP).

This National Park Service list is complete through NPS recent listings posted March 21, 2025.

== Current listings ==
	Name on the Register	Image	Date listed	Location	City or town	Description
1	Dawson County Courthouse	Dawson County Courthouse	September 18, 1980 (#80001010)	Courthouse Sq. 34°25′16″N 84°07′08″W	Dawsonville	
2	Dawson County Jail	Dawson County Jail	September 13, 1985 (#85002083)	HW 53; 34°25′17″N 84°07′13″W	Dawsonville	
3	Boyd and Sallie Gilleland House	Boyd and Sallie Gilleland House	May 6, 2009 (#09000268)	3 Shepard's Ln. 34°25′05″N 84°07′08″W	Dawsonville	
