= Amicalola, Georgia =

Amicalola
- Unincorporated community
- Location within the state of Georgia
- Coordinates: 34°33′17″N 84°15′9″W
- Country: United States
- State: Georgia
- County: Dawson
- Elevation: 1,755 ft (535 m)
- Time zone: UTC-5 (Eastern (EST))
  - Summer (DST): UTC-4 (EDT)
- GNIS feature ID: 354300

Amicalola is an unincorporated community located in Dawson County, Georgia, United States. It was named for the falls and nearby Amcalola Mountain. Amicalola means tumbling water in the Cherokee language; the Cherokee people lived throughout Georgia and southeastern Tennessee before Indian Removal.

A post office called Amicalola was established in 1846, and remained in operation until 1923. The community takes its name from nearby Amicalola Creek.
