= Duff Floyd =

American Prohibition agent (1900-1980)

- Born: 5 November 1900; Pickens County, Georgia
- Died: 30 September 1980 (aged 79); Cobb, Georgia
- Occupation: Prohibition agent

Duff Floyd (November 5, 1900 – 1980) was a member of the Bureau of Alcohol, Tobacco, and Firearms (ATF) in Pickens County, Georgia. During the peak of his career, his territory included two of the United States' most well-known moonshining hotbeds in Dawson and Gilmer counties, combating many of the most prolific moonshiners of the day.

== Early life ==
Duff Floyd was born on 5 November 1900 to Jefferson Jackson "Jeff" Floyd and Mary Adeline "Addie" Linn. On 1 February 1929, nine years into Prohibition, Floyd enlisted as a Justice Department Prohibition Agent in Georgia. He was appointed to Athens, Georgia and quickly established a strong track record, capturing a moonshine operation south of Loganville, Georgia on his first assignment. His success led to his transfer to the more active moonshining territory of Cherokee, Dawson, Gilmer, Jackson, and Pickens counties, where he would remain the rest of his career.

== North and Northwest Georgia ==
During the height of his career, Floyd worked with authorities from Cherokee, Dawson, Gilmer, and Pickens counties to chase "hot rod trippers", as moonshine transporters had come to be known because of their modified automobiles that, in the 1930s, had given rise to stock car racing. In one chase, the Pickens County sheriff shot out the rear tires of Floyd's automobile as he tried to keep up with a car loaded with moonshine.

His position brought him into regular contact with Cherokee County's John Henry Hardin, known at the time as the "moonshine king of Georgia". A Sunday school teacher and former deacon of the Sixes Methodist Church, Hardin often sang religious hymns while working, operating and subcontracting pot stills on land that later became part of Lake Allatoona. Floyd's efforts led to findings of guilt in two federal liquor cases brought against Hardin, effectively ending Hardin’s very profitable career. In the latter stages of Floyd's career, the ATF relied on his past experience flying airplanes as an observer for the Coast Guard in the 1930s, as the ATF integrated an aerial strategy into its moonshine investigations.

== Job-related injuries ==
Working as a revenue agent often proved to be a dangerous job. More than 115 federal agents had died in the 66 years between the start of Prohibition in 1920 and 1986.

Floyd was no exception, as his activities as a "revenuer" resulted in a number of injuries over the years: a broken vertebra in 1936 when his car hit a tree stump; a severe laceration to the head when he crashed an airplane he was flying; and the loss of both an eye and his sense of smell from a severed nerve.

== Death ==
Floyd died on 30 November 1980 in Cobb, Georgia.
