= 1948 United States presidential election in Georgia =

- November 2, 1948

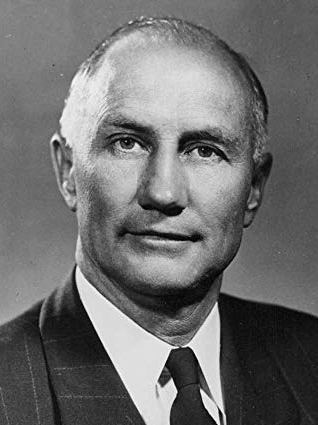

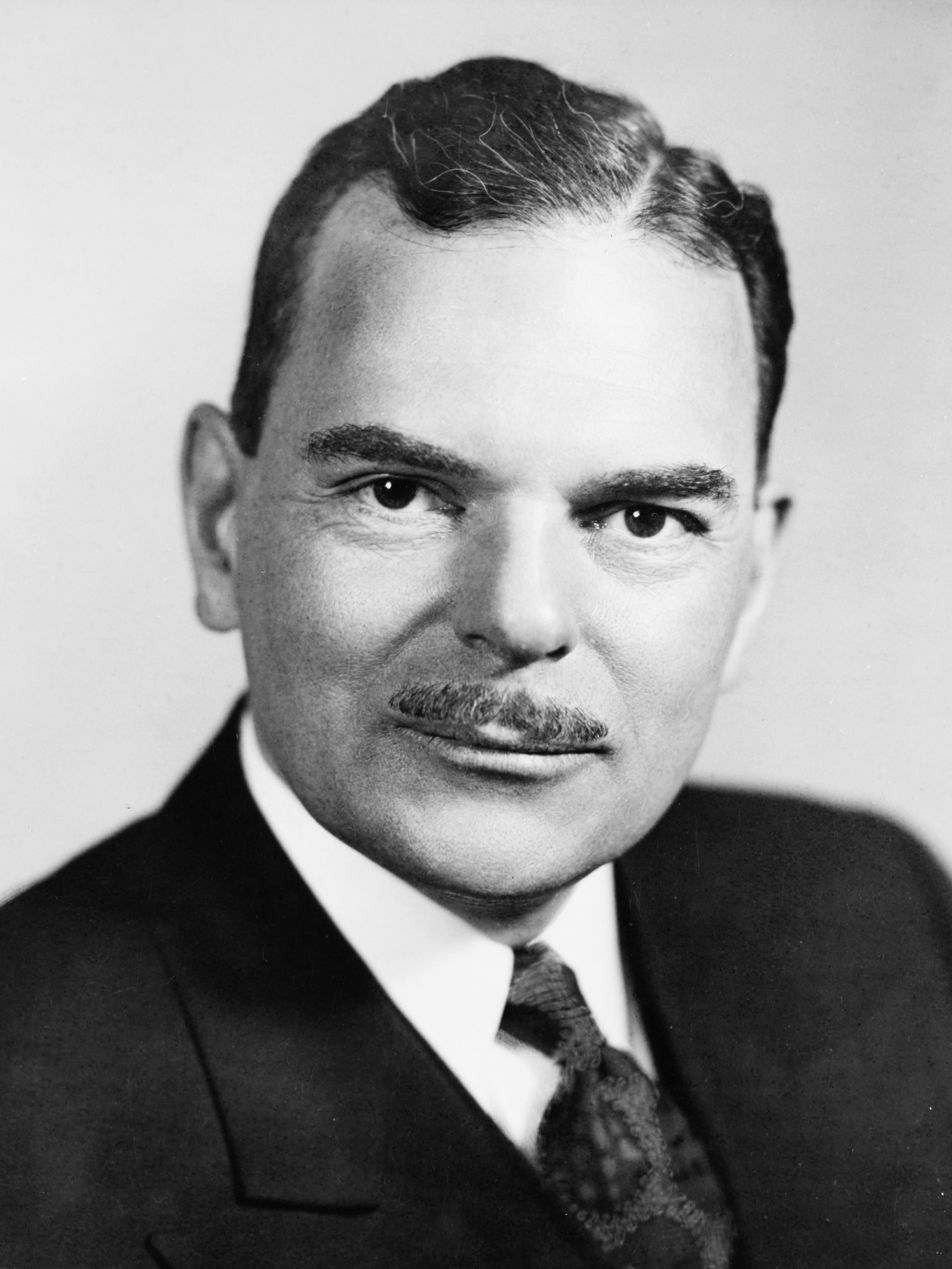
Nominee	Harry Truman	Strom Thurmond	Thomas E. Dewey
Party	Democratic	States' Rights Democratic	Republican
Home state	Missouri	South Carolina	New York
Running mate	Alben Barkley	Fielding L. Wright	Earl Warren
Electoral vote	12	0	0
Popular vote	254,646	85,055	76,691
Percentage	60.81%	20.31%	18.31%
County results
Truman
30–40%
40–50%
50–60%
60–70%
70–80%
80–90%
Thurmond
40–50%
50–60%
60–70%
70–80%
80–90%
Dewey
40–50%
50–60%
President before election
Harry Truman
Democratic
Elected President
Harry Truman
Democratic

The 1948 United States presidential election in Georgia took place on November 2, 1948, as part of the wider United States presidential election. Voters chose 12 representatives, or electors, to the Electoral College, who voted for president and vice president.

With the exception of a handful of historically Unionist North Georgia counties – chiefly Fannin but also to a lesser extent Pickens, Gilmer and Towns – Georgia since the 1880s had been a one-party state dominated by the Democratic Party. Disfranchisement of almost all African-Americans and most poor whites had made the Republican Party virtually nonexistent outside of local governments in those few hill counties, and the national Democratic Party served as the guardian of white supremacy against a Republican Party historically associated with memories of Reconstruction. The only competitive elections were Democratic primaries, which state laws restricted to whites on the grounds of the Democratic Party being legally a private club.

However, on February 2, 1948, incumbent President Harry S. Truman, fearing that the antidemocratic practices and racial discrimination of the South would severely denigrate the United States' reputation in the Cold War, launched the first Civil Rights bill since the end of Reconstruction, along with an executive order for desegregation of the military. Mississippi Governor Fielding Wright had already sounded a call for revolt, which he took to the Southern Governors Conference at Wakulla Springs, Florida, to say that calls for civil rights legislation by national Democrats would not be tolerated in Dixie.

After Truman was renominated at the 1948 Democratic National Convention, Southern Democrats walked out and convened at Birmingham, Alabama on July 17, nominating South Carolina Governor James Strom Thurmond for president and Mississippi Governor Fielding L. Wright for vice president. Given that Georgia had no threat from the Republican Party and a relatively high proportion of African Americans in its population, one would have expected Georgia to oppose Truman's civil rights platform and nominate Thurmond as the official Democratic Party candidate. However, leading "conservative" gubernatorial candidate Herman Talmadge had experienced the three governors controversy in 1947 which removed him from office (Note: Georgia's Supreme Court in Thompson v Talmadge ruled that Melvin E. Thompson was the legitimate governor until the special election was held in the mid-term.) until a special election was to be held concurrently with the presidential election. Herman consequently feared that if he supported Thurmond for president, Truman loyalists would challenge him for governor in the concurrent general election.

Thus, although most of the Talmadge faction was pro-Thurmond, it did not nominate as Democratic electors candidates pledged to support Thurmond and Fielding Wright, unlike the anti-Long faction in Louisiana. Thurmond and Wright thus had to take their place on the ballot as the "States' Rights" party. Interim Governor Thompson also played an important role in ensuring the "Democratic" label would be given to electors supporting the national ticket.

Because Southern senators and congressmen had their seniority to worry about as it determined places on committees, few of Georgia's congressmen would risk openly supporting Thurmond once Truman was established as the "Democratic" candidate. Consequently, Truman had no trouble carrying the state by 40.49%, and Thurmond gained a majority in just 10 of 159 counties. Almost all of these Thurmond counties were located adjacent to the South Carolina governor's home county of Edgefield, South Carolina, while in most counties north of Atlanta, Thurmond's percentage remained in single figures.

Among white voters, 22% supported Thurmond.

Georgia's ballot access laws required parties to submit petitions with at least 5% of all registered voters. The legislature changed the laws to allow the Dixiecrats to appear and this also allowed the Progressives to appear as well. The electors were still required to submit an oath against communism. The Progressives had to replace seven electors who refused to take the oath.

== Results ==
United States presidential election in Georgia, 1948
Party	Candidate	Votes	Percentage	Electoral votes
Democratic	Harry Truman (incumbent)	254,646	60.81%	12
States' Rights	Strom Thurmond	85,055	20.31%	0
Republican	Thomas E. Dewey	76,691	18.31%	0
Progressive	Henry A. Wallace	1,636	0.39%	0
Prohibition	Claude Watson	732	0.17%	0
Socialist (Write-in)	Norman Thomas	3	0.01%	0
Write-in	Morgan Blake	1	0.00%	0

=== Results by county ===
County	Harry S. Truman Democratic		Strom Thurmond Dixiecrat		Thomas E. Dewey Republican		Henry A. Wallace Progressive		Various candidates Others parties		Margin		Total votes cast
County	#	%	#	%	#	%	#	%	#	%	#	%	Total votes cast
Appling	2,268	70.72%	639	19.93%	289	9.01%	5	0.16%	6	0.19%	1,629	50.79%	3,207
Atkinson	938	83.75%	114	10.18%	66	5.89%	1	0.09%	1	0.09%	824	73.57%	1,120
Bacon	785	63.56%	343	27.77%	104	8.42%	2	0.16%	1	0.08%	442	35.79%	1,235
Baker	218	77.03%	58	20.49%	7	2.47%	0	0.00%	0	0.00%	160	56.54%	283
Baldwin	1,132	54.03%	395	18.85%	559	26.68%	6	0.29%	3	0.14%	573	27.35%	2,095
Banks	533	89.13%	26	4.35%	38	6.35%	0	0.00%	1	0.17%	495	82.78%	598
Barrow	1,554	75.69%	344	16.76%	155	7.55%	0	0.00%	0	0.00%	1,210	58.93%	2,053
Bartow	2,384	77.71%	203	6.62%	440	14.34%	28	0.91%	13	0.42%	1,944	63.37%	3,068
Ben Hill	1,438	75.84%	225	11.87%	223	11.76%	1	0.05%	9	0.47%	1,213	63.97%	1,896
Berrien	1,772	83.31%	237	11.14%	107	5.03%	6	0.28%	5	0.24%	1,535	72.17%	2,127
Bibb	7,011	49.80%	3,837	27.26%	3,043	21.62%	165	1.17%	21	0.15%	3,174	22.54%	14,077
Bleckley	536	63.96%	227	27.09%	71	8.47%	0	0.00%	4	0.48%	309	36.87%	838
Brantley	463	60.44%	224	29.24%	79	10.31%	0	0.00%	0	0.00%	239	31.20%	766
Brooks	975	58.14%	511	30.47%	188	11.21%	2	0.12%	1	0.06%	464	27.67%	1,677
Bryan	1,147	65.21%	472	26.83%	135	7.67%	4	0.23%	1	0.06%	675	38.38%	1,759
Bulloch	2,036	68.95%	625	21.16%	276	9.35%	6	0.20%	10	0.34%	1,411	47.79%	2,953
Burke	357	23.86%	1,028	68.72%	107	7.15%	2	0.13%	2	0.13%	-671	-44.86%	1,496
Butts	987	84.50%	119	10.19%	61	5.22%	1	0.09%	0	0.00%	868	74.31%	1,168
Calhoun	399	77.63%	79	15.37%	36	7.00%	0	0.00%	0	0.00%	320	62.26%	514
Camden	552	50.88%	324	29.86%	208	19.17%	1	0.09%	0	0.00%	228	21.02%	1,085
Candler	589	58.49%	290	28.80%	125	12.41%	2	0.20%	1	0.10%	299	29.69%	1,007
Carroll	2,671	72.76%	470	12.80%	526	14.33%	3	0.08%	1	0.03%	2,145	58.43%	3,671
Catoosa	1,051	68.34%	214	13.91%	268	17.43%	3	0.20%	2	0.13%	783	50.91%	1,538
Charlton	339	59.68%	159	27.99%	70	12.32%	0	0.00%	0	0.00%	180	31.69%	568
Chatham	10,864	45.46%	6,839	28.62%	5,966	24.97%	210	0.88%	18	0.08%	4,025	16.84%	23,897
Chattahoochee	46	39.66%	69	59.48%	1	0.86%	0	0.00%	0	0.00%	-23	-19.82%	116
Chattooga	3,396	85.97%	187	4.73%	362	9.16%	4	0.10%	1	0.03%	3,034	76.81%	3,950
Cherokee	1,267	58.85%	250	11.61%	631	29.31%	4	0.19%	1	0.05%	636	29.54%	2,153
Clarke	3,095	71.69%	497	11.51%	707	16.38%	11	0.25%	7	0.16%	2,388	55.31%	4,317
Clay	295	80.38%	33	8.99%	39	10.63%	0	0.00%	0	0.00%	256	69.75%	367
Clayton	2,192	66.50%	757	22.97%	339	10.29%	4	0.12%	4	0.12%	1,435	43.53%	3,296
Clinch	1,283	73.57%	287	16.46%	168	9.63%	1	0.06%	5	0.29%	996	57.11%	1,744
Cobb	4,766	67.15%	779	10.97%	1,524	21.47%	16	0.23%	13	0.18%	3,242	45.68%	7,098
Coffee	3,168	76.45%	653	15.76%	309	7.46%	9	0.22%	5	0.12%	2,515	60.69%	4,144
Colquitt	2,255	65.08%	664	19.16%	537	15.50%	7	0.20%	2	0.06%	1,591	45.92%	3,465
Columbia	164	15.47%	836	78.87%	59	5.57%	0	0.00%	1	0.09%	-672	-63.40%	1,060
Cook	1,192	75.73%	255	16.20%	123	7.81%	0	0.00%	4	0.25%	937	59.53%	1,574
Coweta	2,214	83.58%	209	7.89%	219	8.27%	1	0.04%	6	0.23%	1,995	75.31%	2,649
Crawford	389	54.79%	257	36.20%	64	9.01%	0	0.00%	0	0.00%	132	18.59%	710
Crisp	1,225	62.09%	524	26.56%	221	11.20%	1	0.05%	2	0.10%	701	35.53%	1,973
Dade	1,488	73.45%	193	9.53%	338	16.68%	3	0.15%	4	0.20%	1,150	56.77%	2,026
Dawson	660	44.35%	42	2.82%	786	52.82%	0	0.00%	0	0.00%	-126	-8.47%	1,488
Decatur	1,209	53.21%	757	33.32%	296	13.03%	3	0.13%	7	0.31%	452	19.89%	2,272
DeKalb	10,826	55.46%	2,845	14.57%	5,758	29.50%	64	0.33%	28	0.14%	5,068	25.96%	19,521
Dodge	1,725	69.75%	532	21.51%	210	8.49%	2	0.08%	4	0.16%	1,193	48.24%	2,473
Dooly	577	88.50%	51	7.82%	22	3.37%	1	0.15%	1	0.15%	526	80.68%	652
Dougherty	2,517	64.19%	768	19.59%	614	15.66%	18	0.46%	4	0.10%	1,749	44.60%	3,921
Douglas	1,336	39.93%	987	29.50%	1,019	30.45%	2	0.06%	2	0.06%	317	9.48%	3,346
Early	1,110	82.04%	148	10.94%	94	6.95%	0	0.00%	1	0.07%	962	71.10%	1,353
Echols	332	53.29%	258	41.41%	32	5.14%	1	0.16%	0	0.00%	74	11.88%	623
Effingham	347	26.84%	779	60.25%	160	12.37%	4	0.31%	3	0.23%	-432	-33.41%	1,293
Elbert	1,617	76.17%	350	16.49%	152	7.16%	1	0.05%	3	0.14%	1,267	59.68%	2,123
Emanuel	1,436	59.88%	717	29.90%	241	10.05%	3	0.13%	1	0.04%	719	29.98%	2,398
Evans	953	67.97%	327	23.32%	118	8.42%	0	0.00%	4	0.29%	626	44.65%	1,402
Fannin	1,998	41.03%	82	1.68%	2,789	57.27%	0	0.00%	1	0.02%	-791	-16.24%	4,870
Fayette	825	72.12%	263	22.99%	54	4.72%	0	0.00%	2	0.17%	562	49.13%	1,144
Floyd	5,247	68.94%	653	8.58%	1,689	22.19%	17	0.22%	5	0.07%	3,558	46.75%	7,611
Forsyth	1,813	68.11%	252	9.47%	573	21.53%	3	0.11%	21	0.79%	1,240	46.58%	2,662
Franklin	1,036	77.95%	154	11.59%	138	10.38%	1	0.08%	0	0.00%	882	66.36%	1,329
Fulton	29,318	57.43%	5,980	11.71%	14,976	29.33%	568	1.11%	212	0.42%	14,342	28.10%	51,054
Gilmer	1,275	50.20%	59	2.32%	1,203	47.36%	1	0.04%	2	0.08%	72	2.84%	2,540
Glascock	123	24.40%	365	72.42%	13	2.58%	3	0.60%	0	0.00%	-242	-48.02%	504
Glynn	2,444	53.36%	992	21.66%	1,090	23.80%	50	1.09%	4	0.09%	1,354	29.56%	4,580
Gordon	1,523	73.75%	157	7.60%	377	18.26%	1	0.05%	7	0.34%	1,146	55.49%	2,065
Grady	1,516	69.54%	416	19.08%	244	11.19%	1	0.05%	3	0.14%	1,100	50.46%	2,180
Greene	1,213	76.29%	282	17.74%	92	5.79%	1	0.06%	2	0.13%	931	58.55%	1,590
Gwinnett	2,832	75.99%	471	12.64%	413	11.08%	4	0.11%	7	0.19%	2,361	63.35%	3,727
Habersham	1,477	71.32%	212	10.24%	368	17.77%	10	0.48%	4	0.19%	1,109	53.55%	2,071
Hall	3,093	74.37%	449	10.80%	606	14.57%	4	0.10%	7	0.17%	2,487	59.80%	4,159
Hancock	441	57.12%	219	28.37%	111	14.38%	1	0.13%	0	0.00%	222	28.75%	772
Haralson	2,263	63.51%	457	12.83%	831	23.32%	7	0.20%	5	0.14%	1,432	40.19%	3,563
Harris	759	66.75%	238	20.93%	138	12.14%	1	0.09%	1	0.09%	521	45.82%	1,137
Hart	1,363	89.08%	87	5.69%	78	5.10%	0	0.00%	2	0.13%	1,276	83.39%	1,530
Heard	670	83.75%	53	6.63%	77	9.63%	0	0.00%	0	0.00%	593	74.12%	800
Henry	1,400	75.84%	213	11.54%	229	12.41%	3	0.16%	1	0.05%	1,171	63.43%	1,846
Houston	1,437	69.35%	424	20.46%	204	9.85%	4	0.19%	3	0.14%	1,013	48.89%	2,072
Irwin	946	69.82%	256	18.89%	146	10.77%	6	0.44%	1	0.07%	690	50.93%	1,355
Jackson	1,866	83.98%	211	9.50%	145	6.53%	0	0.00%	0	0.00%	1,655	74.48%	2,222
Jasper	562	64.97%	215	24.86%	87	10.06%	1	0.12%	0	0.00%	347	40.11%	865
Jeff Davis	611	67.51%	211	23.31%	70	7.73%	9	0.99%	4	0.44%	400	44.20%	905
Jefferson	544	31.70%	1,031	60.08%	137	7.98%	2	0.12%	2	0.12%	-487	-28.38%	1,716
Jenkins	595	61.40%	275	28.38%	98	10.11%	1	0.10%	0	0.00%	320	33.02%	969
Johnson	685	54.54%	503	40.05%	67	5.33%	0	0.00%	1	0.08%	182	14.49%	1,256
Jones	588	52.78%	423	37.97%	103	9.25%	0	0.00%	0	0.00%	165	14.81%	1,114
Lamar	909	71.63%	191	15.05%	164	12.92%	0	0.00%	5	0.39%	718	56.58%	1,269
Lanier	486	71.47%	100	14.71%	92	13.53%	1	0.15%	1	0.15%	386	56.76%	680
Laurens	2,325	61.12%	1,211	31.83%	268	7.05%	0	0.00%	0	0.00%	1,114	29.29%	3,804
Lee	215	45.94%	216	46.15%	36	7.69%	1	0.21%	0	0.00%	-1	-0.21%	468
Liberty	820	67.66%	269	22.19%	121	9.98%	2	0.17%	0	0.00%	551	45.47%	1,212
Lincoln	99	13.58%	596	81.76%	32	4.39%	1	0.14%	1	0.14%	-497	-68.18%	729
Long	337	65.69%	151	29.43%	25	4.87%	0	0.00%	0	0.00%	186	36.26%	513
Lowndes	1,867	47.17%	1,448	36.58%	634	16.02%	5	0.13%	4	0.10%	419	10.59%	3,958
Lumpkin	547	74.02%	41	5.55%	142	19.22%	5	0.68%	4	0.54%	405	54.80%	739
Macon	675	57.11%	379	32.06%	127	10.74%	1	0.08%	0	0.00%	296	25.05%	1,182
Madison	1,160	80.61%	214	14.87%	62	4.31%	2	0.14%	1	0.07%	946	65.74%	1,439
Marion	283	52.31%	212	39.19%	45	8.32%	1	0.18%	0	0.00%	71	13.12%	541
McDuffie	182	12.13%	1,260	84.00%	51	3.40%	2	0.13%	5	0.33%	-1,078	-71.87%	1,500
McIntosh	425	48.85%	201	23.10%	233	26.78%	11	1.26%	0	0.00%	192	22.07%	870
Meriwether	1,967	81.65%	237	9.84%	204	8.47%	1	0.04%	0	0.00%	1,730	71.81%	2,409
Miller	723	83.97%	94	10.92%	32	3.72%	6	0.70%	6	0.70%	629	73.05%	861
Mitchell	1,453	70.30%	457	22.11%	152	7.35%	3	0.15%	2	0.10%	996	48.19%	2,067
Monroe	881	62.04%	368	25.92%	169	11.90%	1	0.07%	1	0.07%	513	36.12%	1,420
Montgomery	1,048	61.90%	520	30.71%	117	6.91%	5	0.30%	3	0.18%	528	31.19%	1,693
Morgan	1,147	81.58%	138	9.82%	115	8.18%	4	0.28%	2	0.14%	1,009	71.76%	1,406
Murray	1,653	68.19%	147	6.06%	616	25.41%	7	0.29%	1	0.04%	1,037	42.78%	2,424
Muscogee	5,920	58.02%	1,802	17.66%	2,443	23.94%	31	0.30%	7	0.07%	3,477	34.08%	10,203
Newton	2,113	84.52%	143	5.72%	243	9.72%	0	0.00%	1	0.04%	1,870	74.80%	2,500
Oconee	579	61.93%	254	27.17%	94	10.05%	0	0.00%	8	0.86%	325	34.76%	935
Oglethorpe	819	73.26%	237	21.20%	62	5.55%	0	0.00%	0	0.00%	582	52.06%	1,118
Paulding	981	67.38%	139	9.55%	333	22.87%	0	0.00%	3	0.21%	648	44.51%	1,456
Peach	642	53.81%	372	31.18%	166	13.91%	11	0.92%	2	0.17%	270	22.63%	1,193
Pickens	1,239	45.52%	225	8.27%	1,255	46.11%	3	0.11%	0	0.00%	-16	-0.59%	2,722
Pierce	908	59.97%	492	32.50%	108	7.13%	3	0.20%	3	0.20%	416	27.47%	1,514
Pike	256	54.24%	142	30.08%	72	15.25%	0	0.00%	2	0.42%	114	24.16%	472
Polk	2,918	78.74%	277	7.47%	491	13.25%	19	0.51%	1	0.03%	2,427	65.49%	3,706
Pulaski	567	71.41%	161	20.28%	64	8.06%	2	0.25%	0	0.00%	406	51.13%	794
Putnam	609	71.31%	132	15.46%	110	12.88%	3	0.35%	0	0.00%	477	55.85%	854
Quitman	246	68.14%	93	25.76%	19	5.26%	3	0.83%	0	0.00%	153	42.38%	361
Rabun	747	77.09%	54	5.57%	165	17.03%	2	0.21%	1	0.10%	582	60.06%	969
Randolph	575	59.28%	259	26.70%	134	13.81%	2	0.21%	0	0.00%	316	32.58%	970
Richmond	2,450	19.07%	8,814	68.61%	1,528	11.89%	31	0.24%	23	0.18%	-6,364	-49.54%	12,846
Rockdale	1,209	81.63%	140	9.45%	126	8.51%	1	0.07%	5	0.34%	1,069	72.18%	1,481
Schley	257	68.53%	74	19.73%	43	11.47%	0	0.00%	1	0.27%	183	48.80%	375
Screven	838	55.39%	502	33.18%	172	11.37%	0	0.00%	1	0.07%	336	22.21%	1,513
Seminole	722	80.31%	71	7.90%	105	11.68%	0	0.00%	1	0.11%	617	68.63%	899
Spalding	3,441	74.38%	671	14.50%	506	10.94%	2	0.04%	6	0.13%	2,770	59.88%	4,626
Stephens	912	68.93%	130	9.83%	278	21.01%	0	0.00%	3	0.23%	634	47.92%	1,323
Stewart	276	46.94%	265	45.07%	46	7.82%	1	0.17%	0	0.00%	11	1.87%	588
Sumter	1,018	47.48%	858	40.02%	256	11.94%	2	0.09%	10	0.47%	160	7.46%	2,144
Talbot	582	71.67%	135	16.63%	92	11.33%	1	0.12%	2	0.25%	447	55.04%	812
Taliaferro	504	84.14%	73	12.19%	21	3.51%	0	0.00%	1	0.17%	431	71.95%	599
Tattnall	1,071	57.46%	567	30.42%	216	11.59%	5	0.27%	5	0.27%	504	27.04%	1,864
Taylor	638	57.95%	360	32.70%	99	8.99%	3	0.27%	1	0.09%	278	25.25%	1,101
Telfair	712	63.18%	339	30.08%	75	6.65%	0	0.00%	1	0.09%	373	33.10%	1,127
Terrell	608	63.93%	242	25.45%	100	10.52%	0	0.00%	1	0.11%	366	38.48%	951
Thomas	1,429	38.97%	1,295	35.31%	925	25.22%	8	0.22%	10	0.27%	134	3.66%	3,667
Tift	3,158	68.00%	829	17.85%	637	13.72%	5	0.11%	15	0.32%	2,329	50.15%	4,644
Toombs	1,161	57.59%	656	32.54%	193	9.57%	1	0.05%	5	0.25%	505	25.05%	2,016
Towns	516	62.62%	6	0.73%	302	36.65%	0	0.00%	0	0.00%	214	25.97%	824
Treutlen	413	61.37%	216	32.10%	26	3.86%	1	0.15%	17	2.53%	197	29.27%	673
Troup	3,896	75.37%	731	14.14%	536	10.37%	4	0.08%	2	0.04%	3,165	61.23%	5,169
Turner	774	67.72%	222	19.42%	147	12.86%	0	0.00%	0	0.00%	552	48.30%	1,143
Twiggs	359	44.05%	401	49.20%	52	6.38%	1	0.12%	2	0.25%	-42	-5.15%	815
Union	1,420	51.12%	75	2.70%	1,274	45.86%	2	0.07%	7	0.25%	146	5.26%	2,778
Upson	2,432	81.26%	293	9.79%	262	8.75%	1	0.03%	5	0.17%	2,139	71.47%	2,993
Walker	3,418	69.83%	477	9.74%	980	20.02%	7	0.14%	13	0.27%	2,438	49.81%	4,895
Walton	2,440	84.99%	262	9.13%	164	5.71%	3	0.10%	2	0.07%	2,178	75.86%	2,871
Ware	2,611	56.15%	1,374	29.55%	655	14.09%	6	0.13%	4	0.09%	1,237	26.60%	4,650
Warren	256	31.45%	525	64.50%	33	4.05%	0	0.00%	0	0.00%	-269	-33.05%	814
Washington	1,169	84.77%	2	0.15%	204	14.79%	4	0.29%	0	0.00%	965	69.98%	1,379
Wayne	1,277	72.89%	278	15.87%	190	10.84%	2	0.11%	5	0.29%	999	57.02%	1,752
Webster	118	37.58%	117	37.26%	79	25.16%	0	0.00%	0	0.00%	1	0.32%	314
Wheeler	560	63.28%	286	32.32%	39	4.41%	0	0.00%	0	0.00%	274	30.96%	885
White	497	78.89%	72	11.43%	59	9.37%	0	0.00%	2	0.32%	425	67.46%	630
Whitfield	3,419	63.42%	621	11.52%	1,249	23.17%	94	1.74%	8	0.15%	2,170	40.25%	5,391
Wilcox	791	70.94%	247	22.15%	75	6.73%	1	0.09%	1	0.09%	544	48.79%	1,115
Wilkes	771	63.61%	345	28.47%	95	7.84%	1	0.08%	0	0.00%	426	35.14%	1,212
Wilkinson	501	45.59%	500	45.50%	96	8.74%	1	0.09%	1	0.09%	1	0.09%	1,099
Worth	1,159	77.06%	216	14.36%	124	8.24%	3	0.20%	2	0.13%	943	62.70%	1,504
Totals	254,646	60.81%	85,055	20.31%	76,691	18.31%	1,636	0.39%	736	0.18%	169,591	40.50%	418,764

==== Counties that flipped from Democratic to Republican ====
- Dawson

==== Counties that flipped from Democratic to Dixiecrat ====
- Burke
- Chattahoochee
- Columbia
- Glascock
- Jefferson
- Lee
- Lincoln
- McDuffie
- Twiggs
- Warren
- Effingham
- Richmond

== See also ==
- United States presidential elections in Georgia

== Works cited ==
- Black, Earl; Black, Merle (1992). The Vital South: How Presidents Are Elected. Harvard University Press. ISBN 0674941306.
- Schmidt, Karl (1960). Henry A. Wallace: Quixotic Crusade 1948. Syracuse University Press. ISBN 978-0-8156-0020-6.
