= Gilleland House =

Historic house in Georgia, United States

- Boyd and Sallie Gilleland House
- U.S. National Register of Historic Places
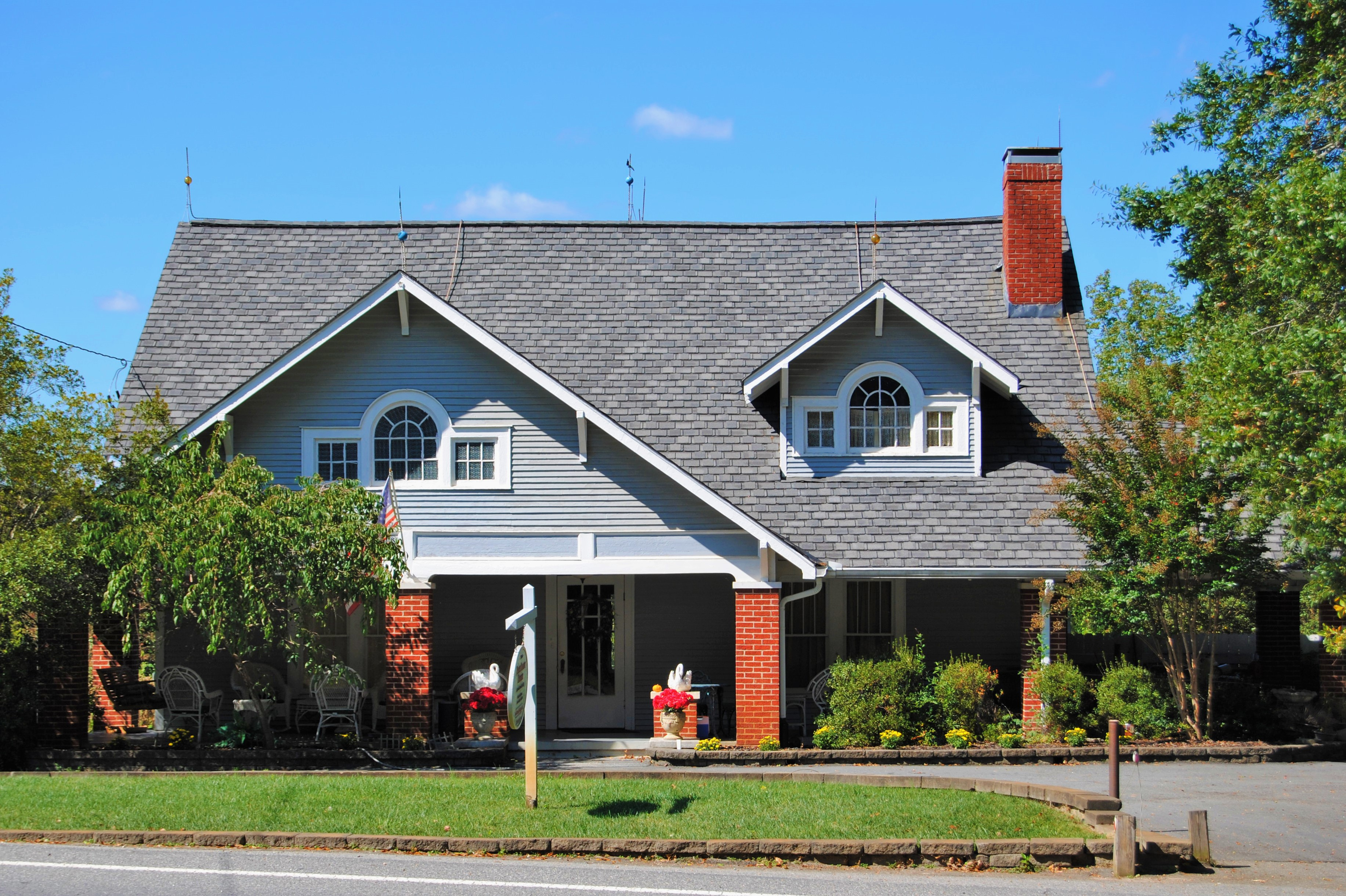

- Location within Georgia Location within the United States
- Location: 3 Shepard's Lane, Dawsonville, Georgia
- Coordinates: 34°25′5″N 84°7′8″W
- Area: less than one acre
- Built: 1929
- Architectural style: Bungalow/Craftsman
- NRHP reference No.: 09000268
- Added to NRHP: May 6, 2009

The Boyd and Sallie Gilleland House (now known as Peach Brandy Cottage) is a historic residence in Dawsonville, Georgia. It is located at 3 Shepard's Lane on Georgia Highway 9 (known as Thunder Road because of its use by moonshiners), leading to Atlanta.

== Description and history ==
The 1 1/2-story, wood-framed Craftsman style bungalow was built in 1929. According to its NRHP description, it is a “side-gable bungalow type with a projecting front-gable roof over the porch and a front-gable dormer.”

The home contained moonshiner Boyd Gilleland's still, used during the era of Prohibition (Prohibition in the United States lasted from 1920 - 1933). The home is on a road leading to Atlanta, and the liquor produced was sold at speakeasies. The family also owned a service station, hardware store and Amicalola Lodge, and Boyd Gilleland was a Dawson County Tax Commissioner and a founder of Dawson County Bank. The house was added to the National Register of Historic Places on May 6, 2009, for its architectural and historical significance.

== See also ==
- National Register of Historic Places listings in Dawson County, Georgia
