= Dawson County Jail =

Historic jail in Georgia, US

- U.S. National Register of Historic Places
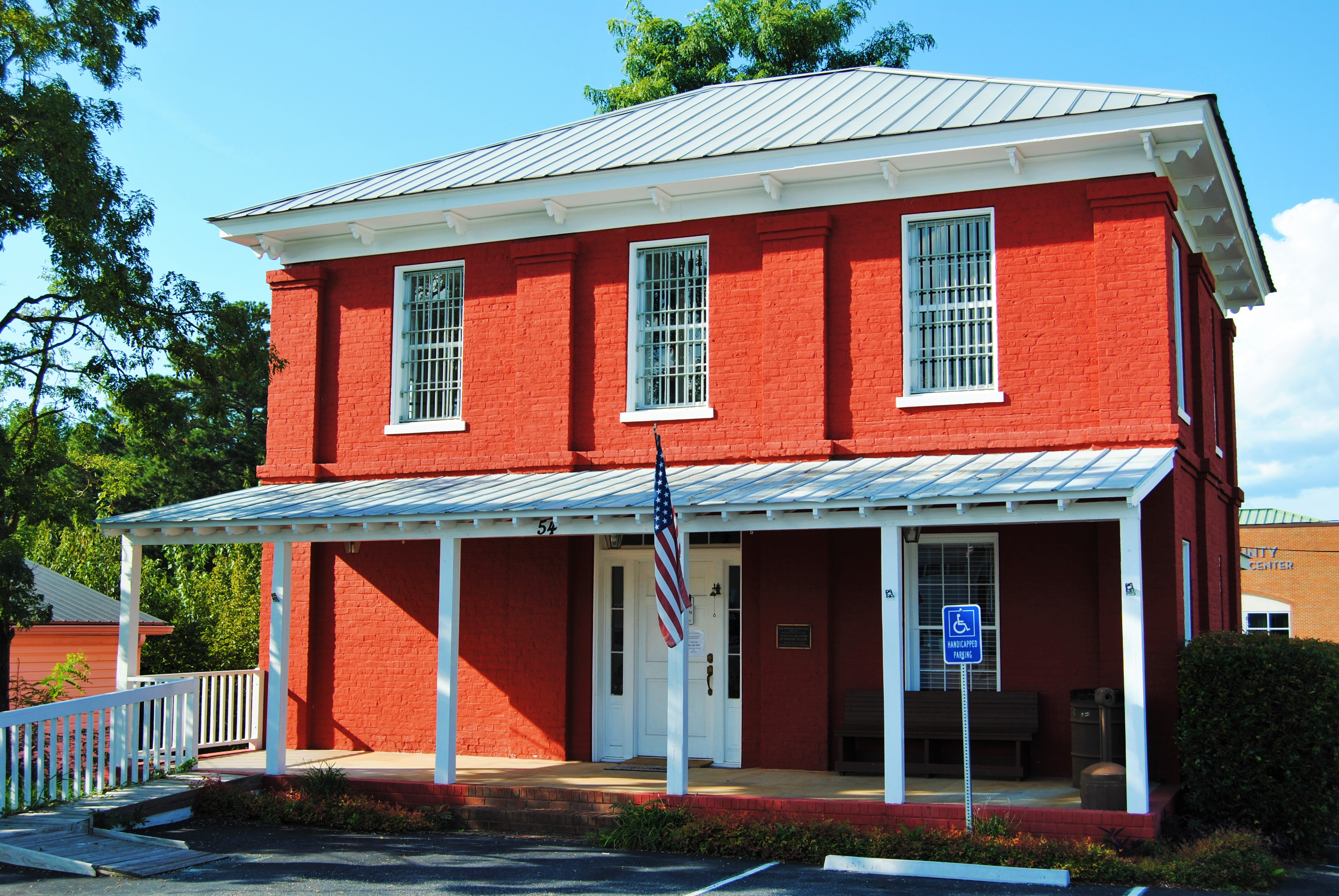

- Location within Georgia Location within the United States
- Location: HW 53, Dawsonville, Georgia
- Coordinates: 34°25′17″N 84°7′13″W
- Area: less than one acre
- Built: 1881
- Built by: McGinty, M.B.
- Architectural style: Italianate
- MPS: County Jails of the Georgia Mountains Area TR
- NRHP reference No.: 85002083
- Added to NRHP: September 13, 1985

The Dawson County Jail in Dawsonville, Georgia, also known as Old Dawson County Jail, is listed on the National Register of Historic Places. It was built in 1881 and modified in 1931, 1974, and 1979. It was built by M.B. McGinty, a builder from Athens, Georgia.

The jail is a two-story 33 feet (10 m) by 26 feet (7.9 m) red brick, Italianate-style building with a hipped roof that used to be covered by "good heart-pine shingles laid 5 inches to the weather". The exterior walls are 13-inch (0.33 m) thick and its interior walls are 9-inch (0.23 m) thick.

It is the third building to be Dawson County's jail; the first, built in 1858, was destroyed by fire set by a prisoner in 1865 or 1866. The second jail, with wooden walls and floors, had a "criminal floor" which was noted in 1873 to be "fine", but the "debtor's floor" was "not secure".
