= List of the seven natural wonders of Georgia (U.S. state) =

Locations of the Seven Natural Wonders of Georgia

The Seven Natural Wonders of Georgia are considered to be:

- Amicalola Falls
- Okefenokee Swamp
- Providence Canyon
- Radium Springs
- Stone Mountain
- Tallulah Gorge
- Warm Springs
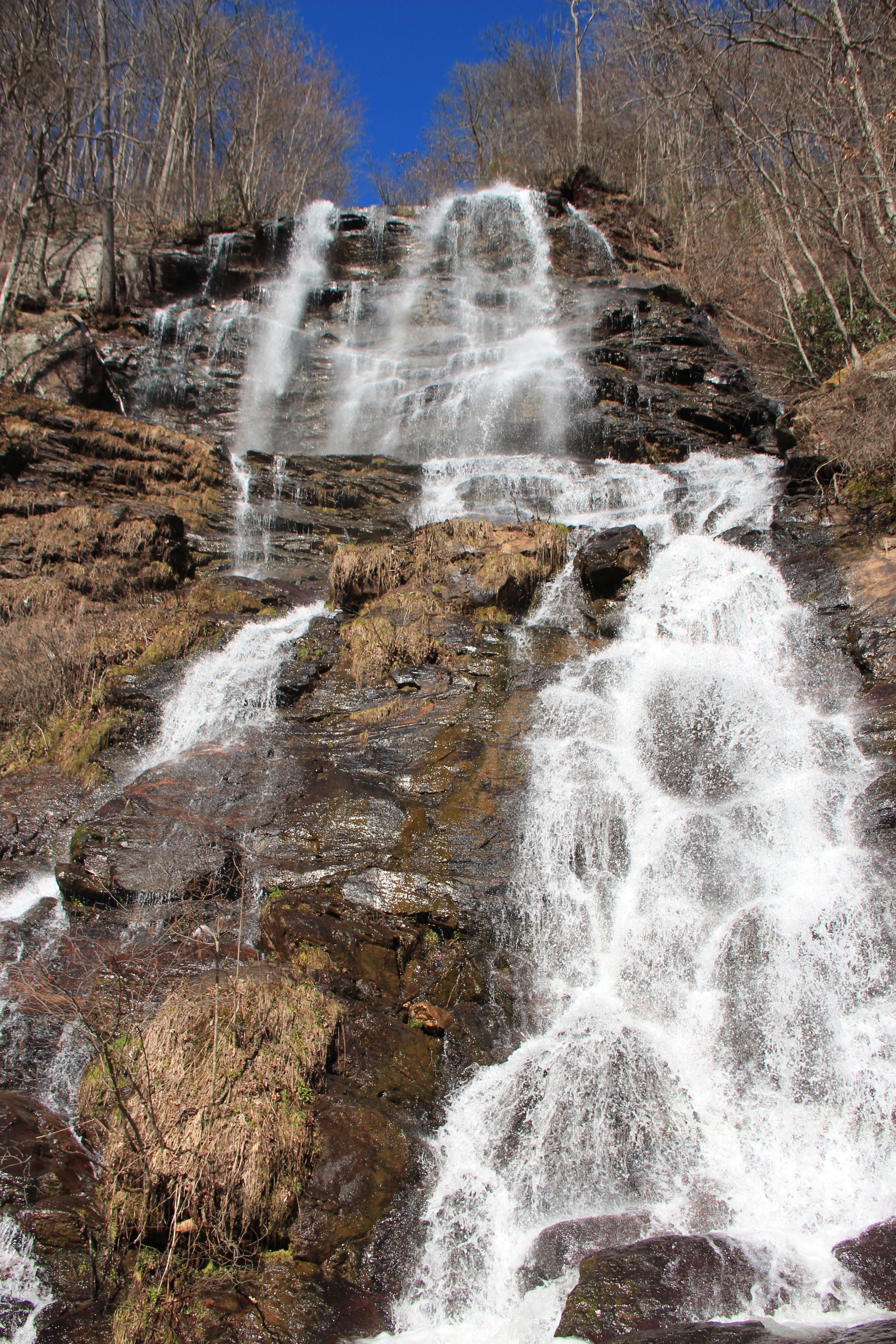
Amicalola Falls

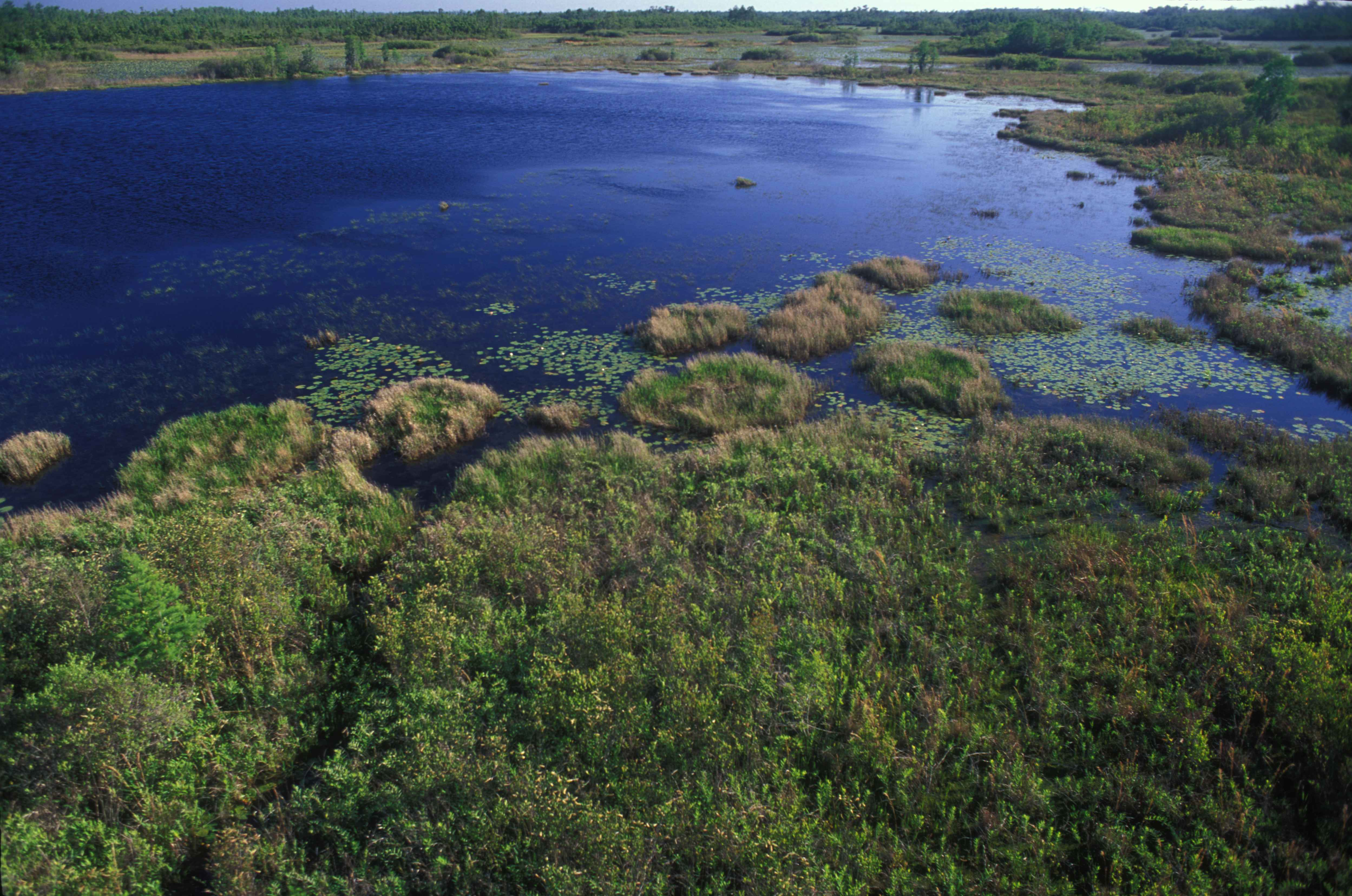
Okefenokee Swamp

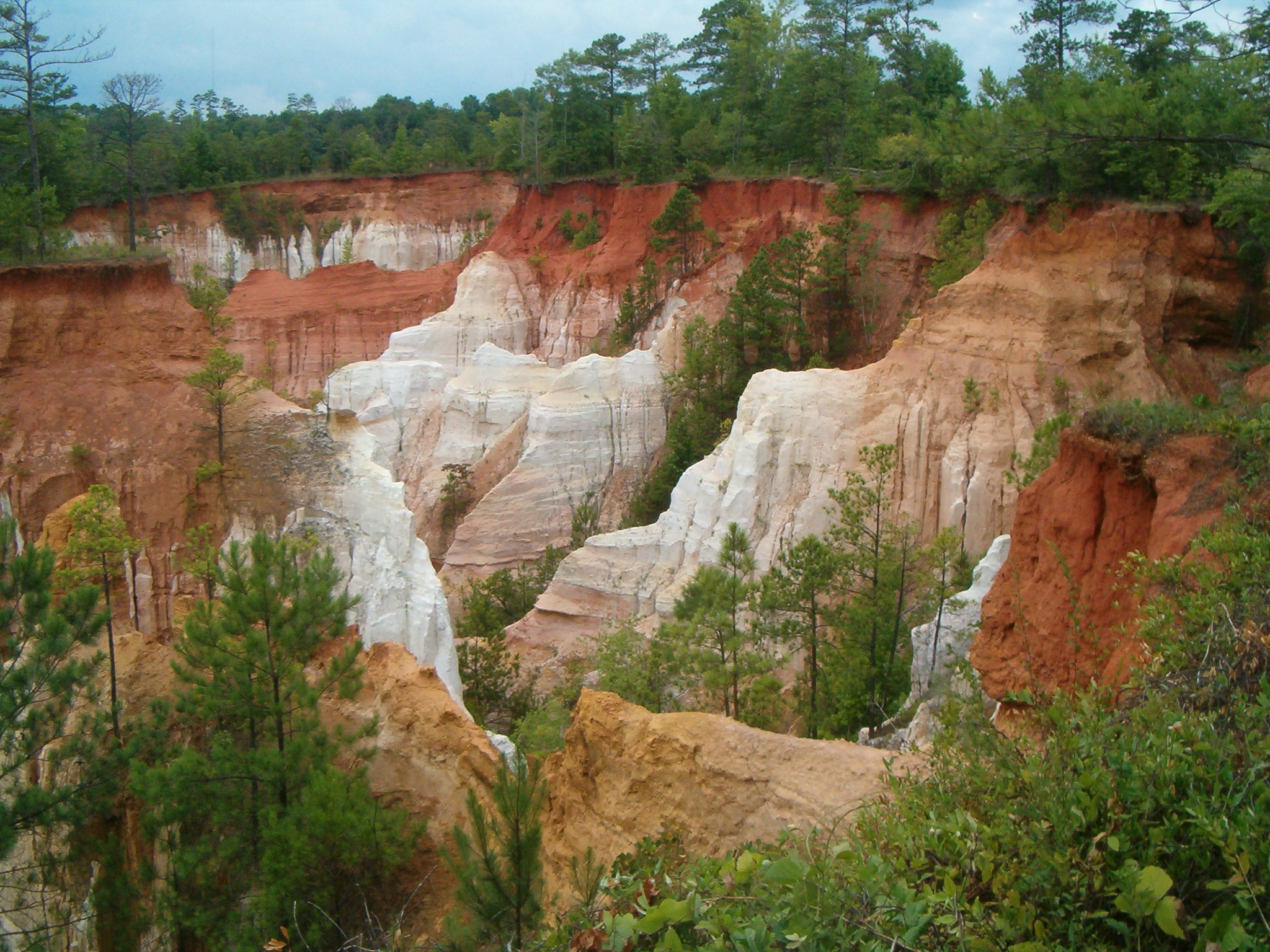
Providence Canyon

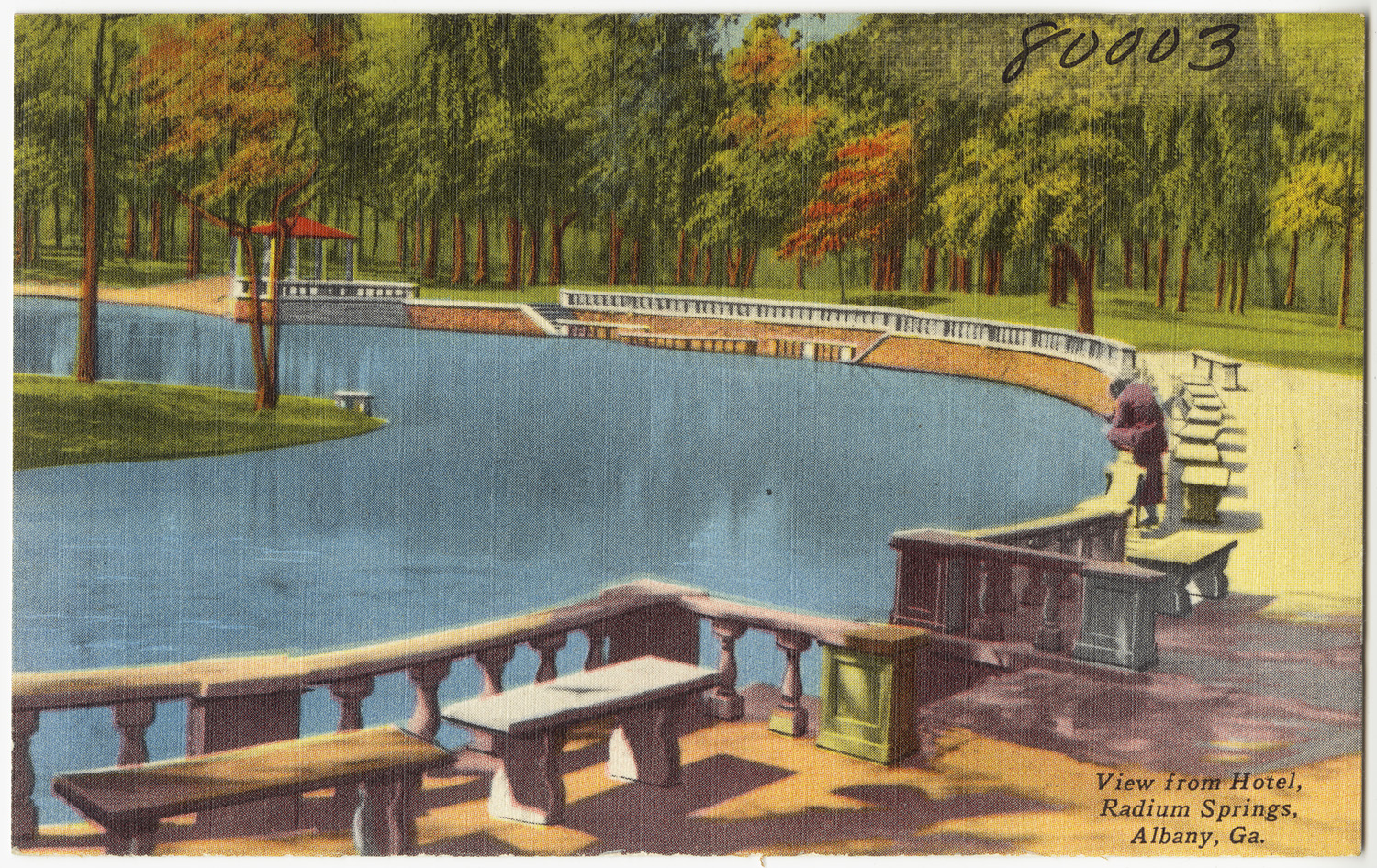
Radium Springs

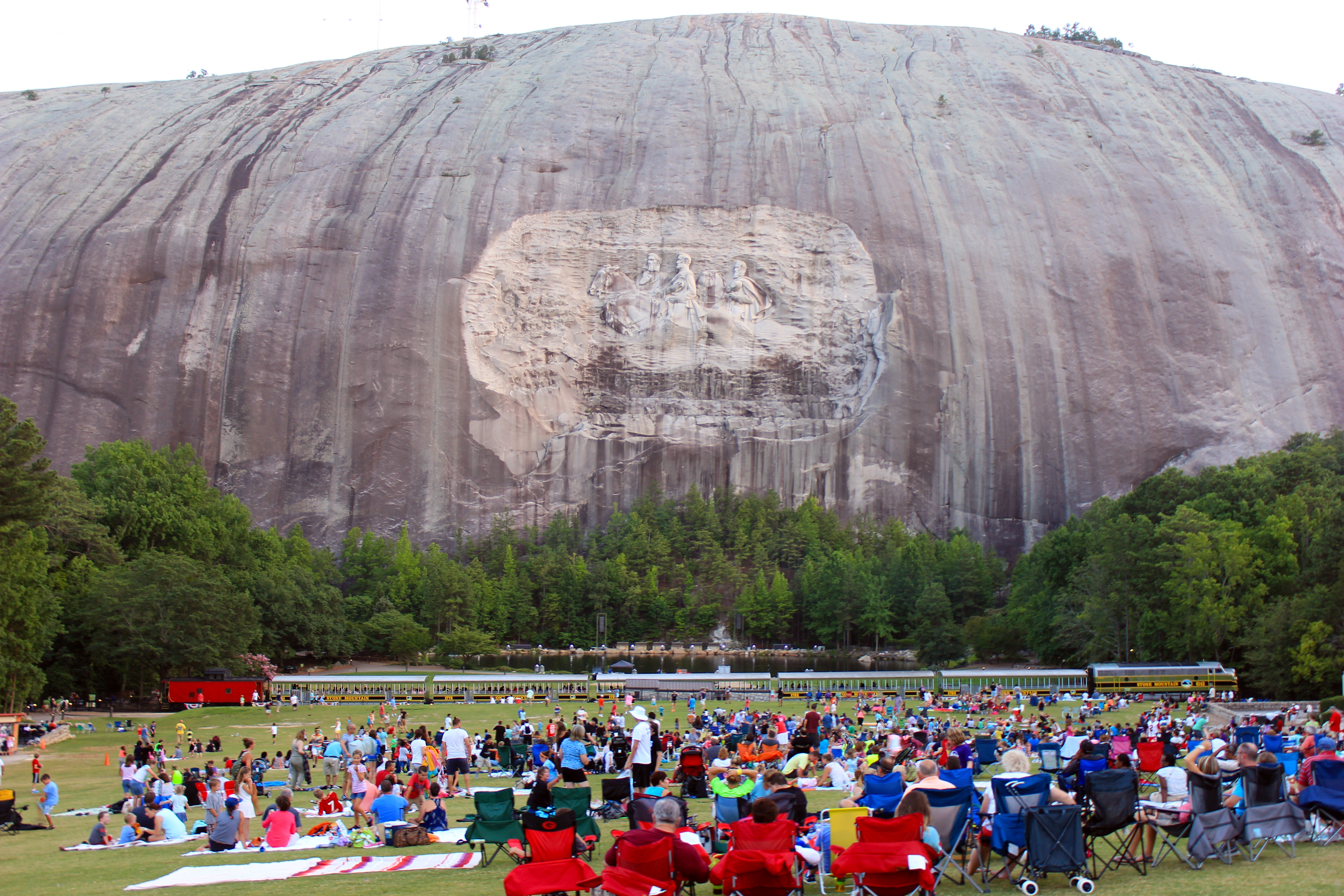
Stone Mountain

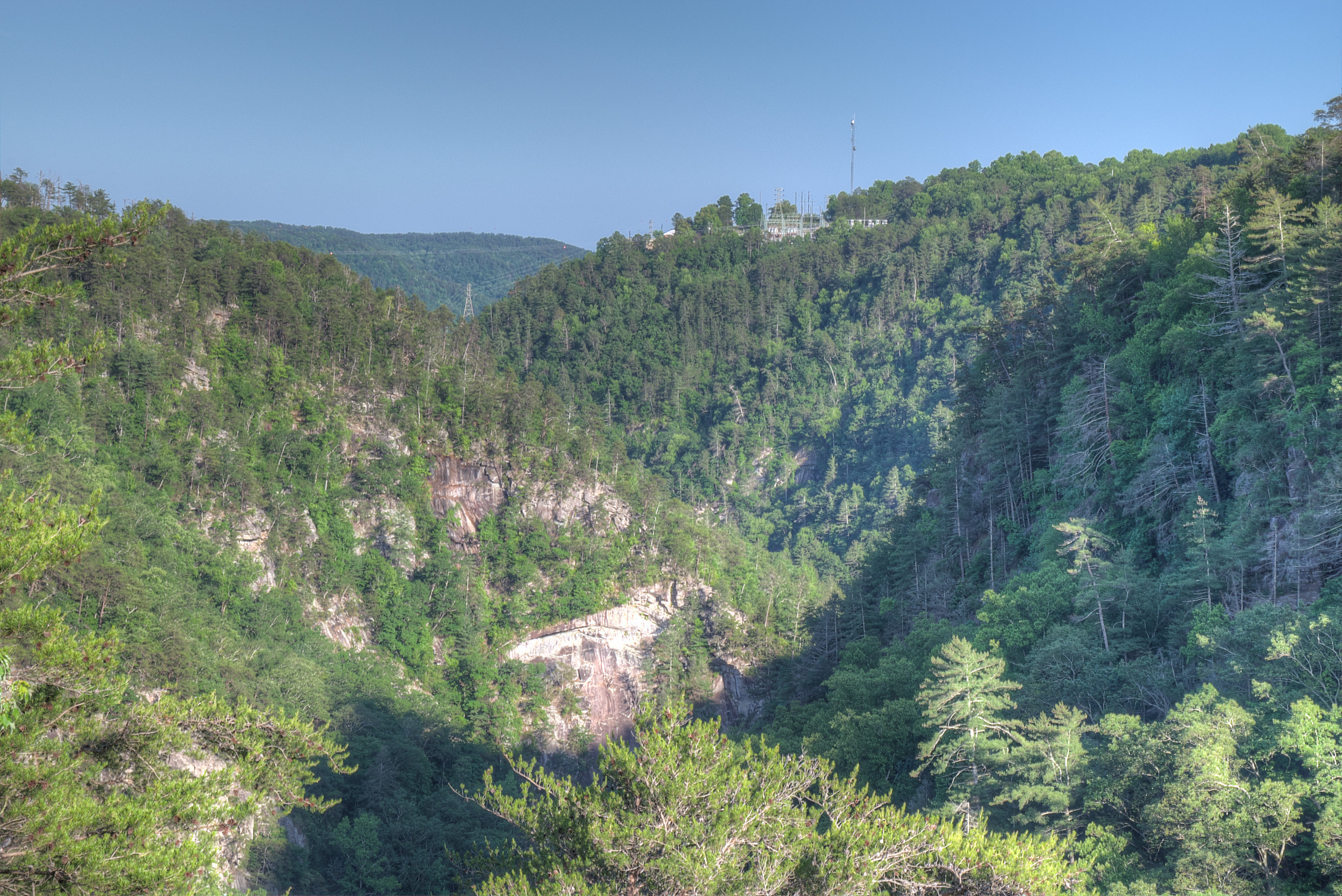
Tallulah Gorge

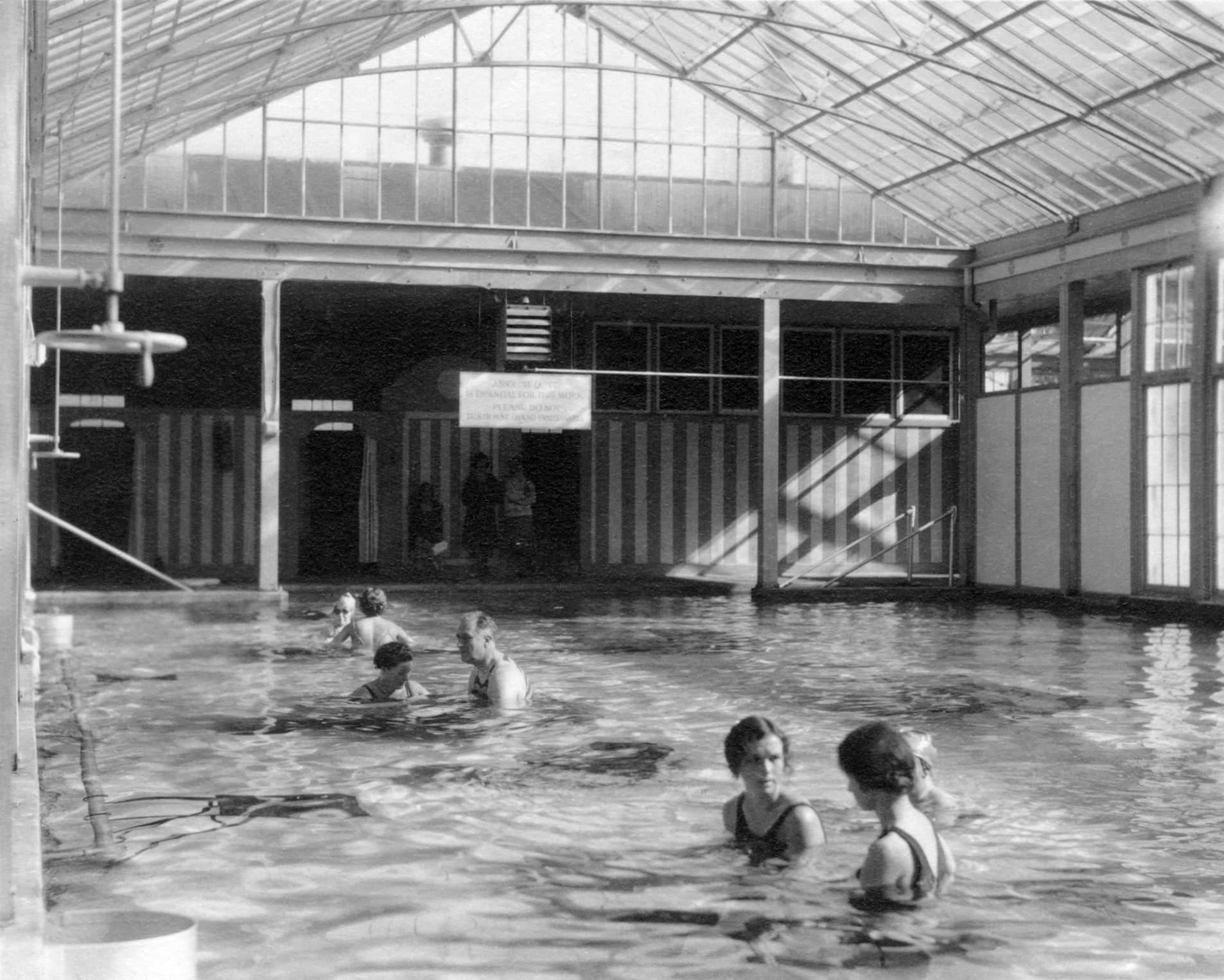
Warm Springs

The first list of natural wonders was compiled by state librarian Ella May Thornton and published in the Atlanta Georgian magazine on December 26, 1926. That first list included:

- Amicalola Falls
- Jekyll Island Forest
- Marble vein in Longswamp Valley in Pickens County
- Okefenokee Swamp
- Stone Mountain
- Tallulah Gorge
- Warm Springs
