= Georgia Nuclear Aircraft Laboratory =

Test facility in Dawsonville, Georgia

Coordinates: 34°21′4.3″N 84°8′38.5″W

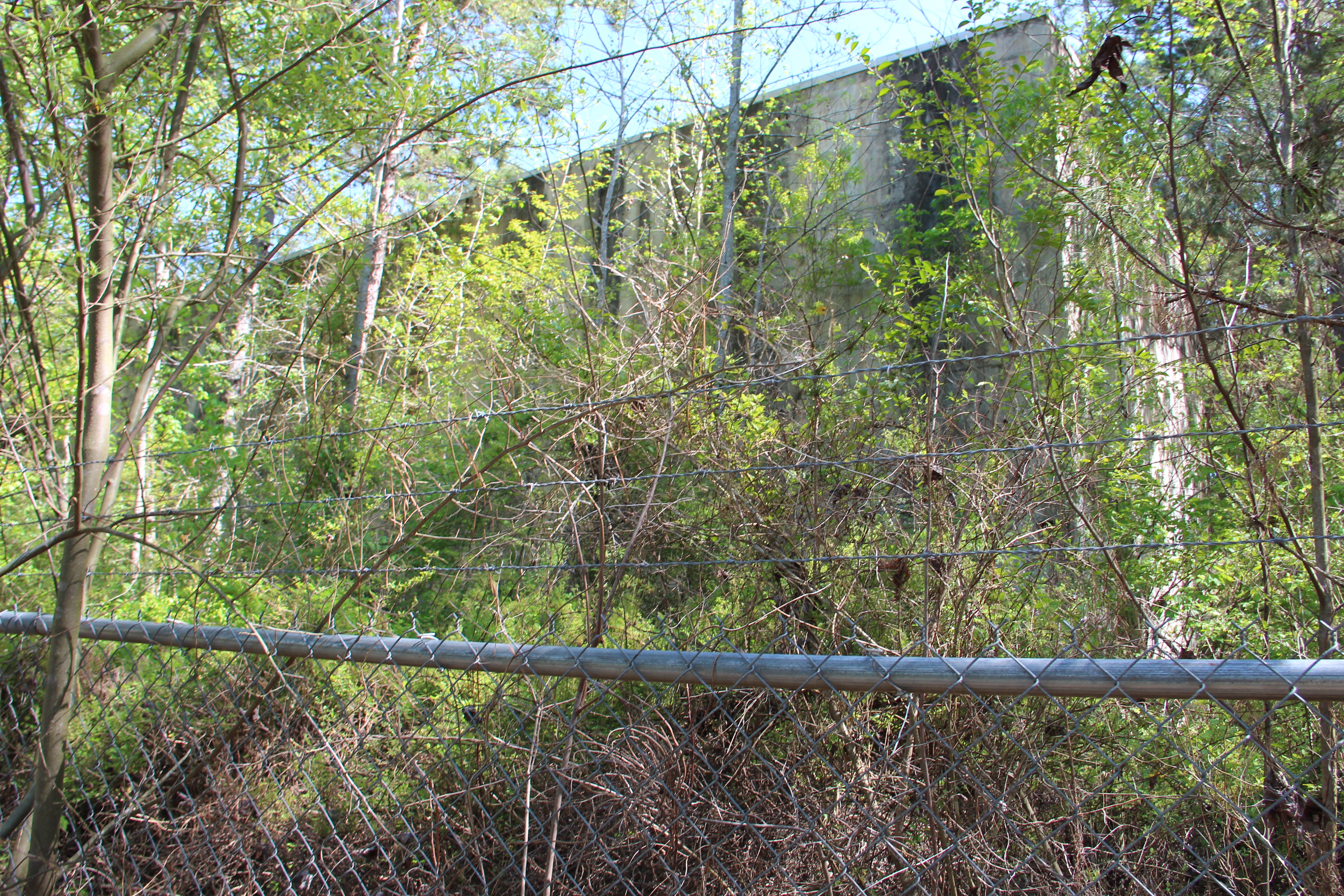
Abandoned hot cell building

The Georgia Nuclear Aircraft Laboratory, also known as AFP No. 67, for Air Force Plant 67 was a United States Air Force test facility located in the Dawson Forest in Dawsonville, Georgia. It was the site of Lockheed's lab for investigating the feasibility of nuclear aircraft. The site was used for irradiating military equipment, as well as the forest to determine the effect of nuclear war, and its effects on wildlife. The area was closed in 1971 and acquired by the city of Atlanta for a second airport, but its topography was determined to be ill-suited for an airport. Documents explaining what went on at the site remain classified. The entrance to the underground portion of the facility is accessible, but it is entirely flooded, except for a few feet of the top level. The only objects left above ground were the concrete foundations on which the buildings and reactors were placed. Portions of the hot-cell facility walls are still visible.
