= Dawson County, Georgia =

County in Georgia, United States

- County
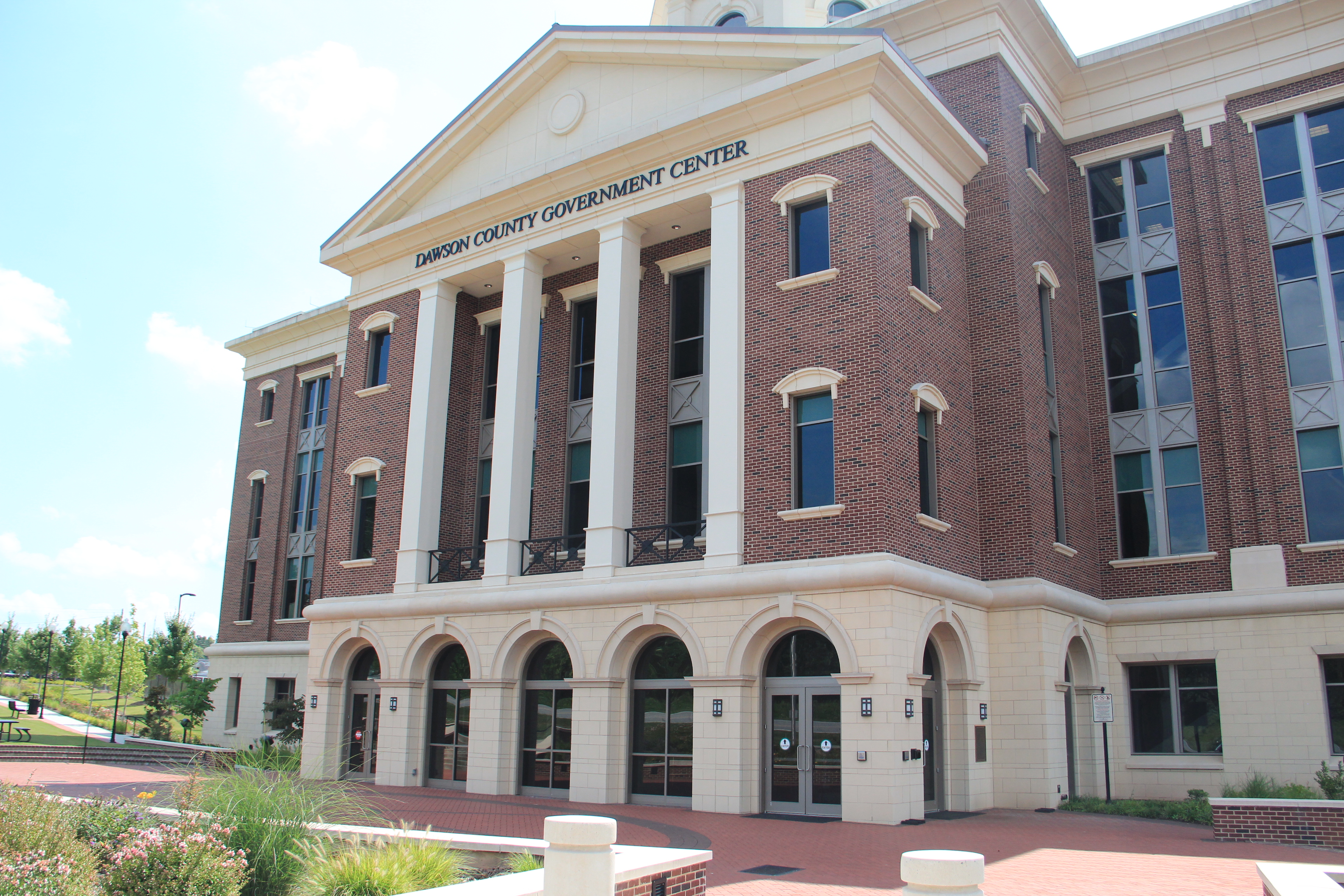
- Dawson County Courthouse in Dawsonville

- Flag Seal

- Location within the U.S. state of Georgia
- Coordinates: 34°26′N 84°10′W
- Country: United States
- State: Georgia
- Founded: 1857; 169 years ago
- Named for: William Crosby Dawson
- Seat: Dawsonville
- Largest city: Dawsonville

Area
  - Total: 214 sq mi (550 km^{2})
  - Land: 211 sq mi (550 km^{2})
  - Water: 3.6 sq mi (9.3 km^{2}) 1.7%

Population (2020)
  - Total: 26,798
  - Estimate (2025): 35,365 ▲
  - Density: 127/sq mi (49.0/km^{2})
- Time zone: UTC−5 (Eastern)
  - Summer (DST): UTC−4 (EDT)
- Congressional district: 7th
- Website: www.dawsoncountyga.gov

Dawson County is a county in the Northeast region of the U.S. state of Georgia. As of the 2020 census, the population was 26,798 up from 22,330 in 2010. The county seat is Dawsonville.

Dawson County is included in the Atlanta metropolitan statistical area. Its natural resources include Amicalola Falls, the highest falls in Georgia and one of the Seven Natural Wonders of the state.

== History ==
Dawson County was created on December 3, 1857, from Gilmer and Lumpkin Counties. It is named for William Crosby Dawson, a U.S. Senator from Georgia.

=== American Civil War ===
The 1860s brought war and hardships to the people of Dawson County. Many men of Dawson County answered the call and went to fight in the Civil War. Several Confederate units were raised in Dawson County, including:

- 21st Regiment, Georgia Infantry, Company E Concord Rangers
- 22nd Regiment, Georgia Infantry, Company I, Dawson County Independents
- 38th Regiment, Georgia Infantry, Company I (Wright's Legion), Dawson Farmers
- 38th Regiment, Georgia Infantry, Company L (Wright's Legion)
- 52nd Regiment, Georgia Volunteer Infantry, Company I

The 1st Georgia Infantry Battalion (Union), Companies B and C also was raised there.

=== Post-Civil War to present ===
Dawson County is known for its long involvement in auto racing, which was established in the 20th century; many of the original NASCAR racers came from this area, and Dawsonville is now one of a few areas considered to be the "birthplace of stock car racing". Local racing skills are said to have been developed by men who ran moonshine down Georgia State Route 9, also known as Thunder Road, to Atlanta. The celebration of Dawson County's history and its involvement in bootlegging moonshine during the Prohibition era now occurs every October, dubbed the Moonshine Festival.

Locals have referred to Dawson County as the "Moonshine Capital of the World". This title is claimed by many other cities and communities, but is fiercely defended by residents of the area. Allegedly, bootleggers took advantage of the county's relative isolation and the ability to move so much moonshine to the larger cities, especially Atlanta, during the United States Prohibition era. Duff Floyd worked for many years as an ATF agent busting moonshine operations in Dawson County, as well as in nearby Gilmer County.

== Education ==
Dawson County currently serves grades K-12. It has a total of seven schools: one for pre-K, four for grades K-5, one for grades 6–7, one for grades 8–9, and Dawson County High School (grades 10–12).

== Geography ==
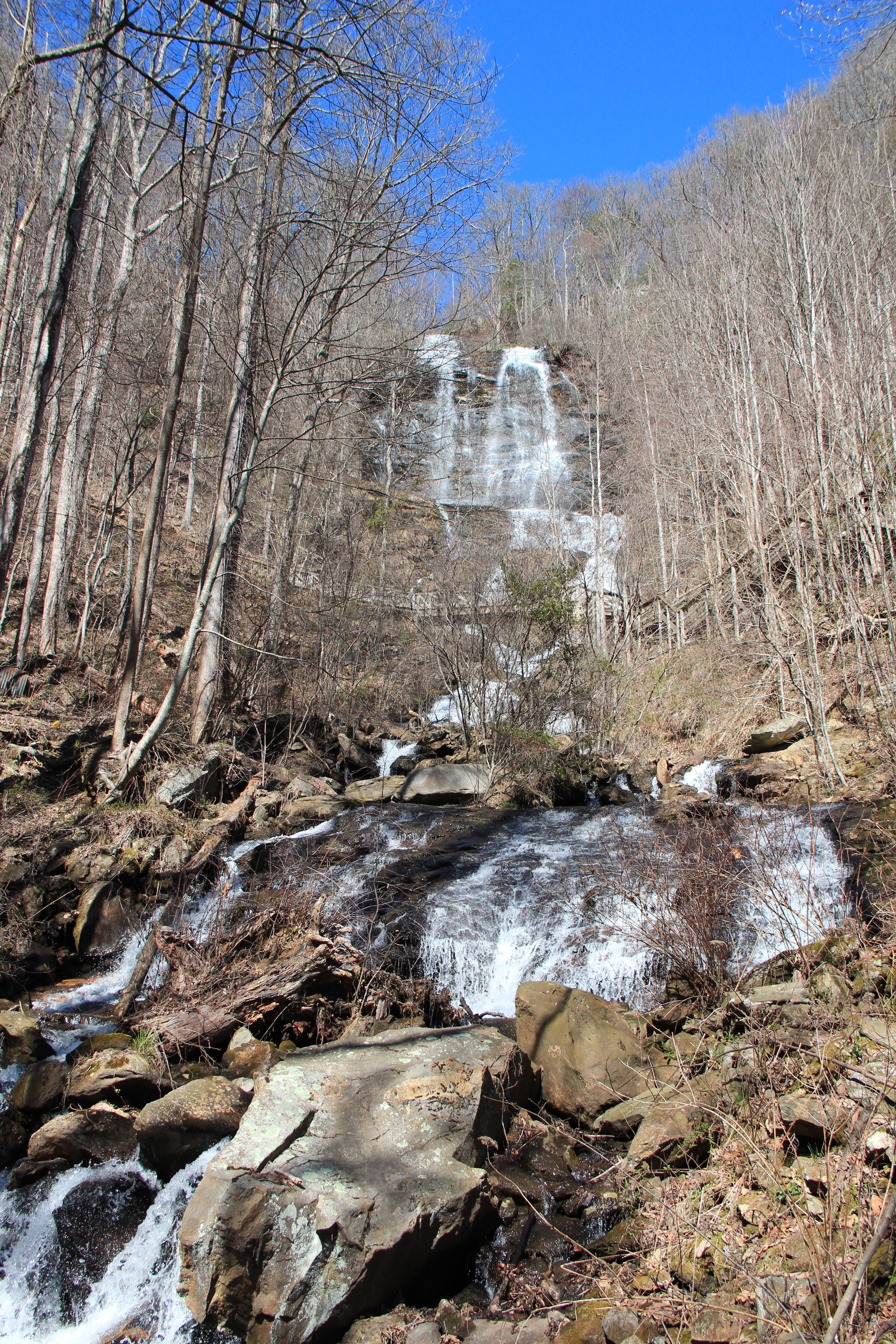
Amicalola Falls

According to the U.S. Census Bureau, the county has a total area of 214 square miles (550 km^{2}), of which 211 square miles (550 km^{2}) are land and 3.6 square miles (9.3 km^{2}) (1.7%) are covered by water.

The county is located in the foothills of the Blue Ridge Mountains. Portions of the mountain chain extend into the far northern and western portions of the county, with elevations around 3,500 ft. in this area.

Part of Lake Lanier is in the southeastern part of the county and the boundary lines with neighboring counties pass through the lake. The 729-foot (222 m) Amicalola Falls, are located in the county. The Amicalola Falls are the highest in Georgia, the tallest cascading waterfall east of the Mississippi River, and one of the Seven Natural Wonders of Georgia. The highest point in the county is Black Mountain, with an elevation of 3,600 feet (1,100 m). The Chestatee and Etowah Rivers flow through Dawson County.

The vast majority of Dawson County is located in the Etowah River subbasin of the ACT River Basin (Coosa-Tallapoosa River Basin). The southeastern tip of the county is located in the Upper Chattahoochee River subbasin of the Apalachicola-Chattahoochee-Flint River Basin, and a very small northern section of Dawson County is located in the Coosawattee River subbasin of the larger ACT River Basin.

=== Adjacent counties ===
- Fannin County - north
- Lumpkin County - northeast
- Hall County - east
- Forsyth County - south
- Cherokee County - southwest
- Pickens County - west
- Gilmer County - northwest

=== National protected area ===
- Chattahoochee National Forest (part)

== Communities ==
=== Cities ===
- Dawsonville

=== Unincorporated communities ===
- Juno
- Afton

=== Private communities ===
Several large, gated, private communities function similar to a municipality, providing many municipal-type services that operate independently of county government.

- Big Canoe

== Demographics ==
Historical population
Census	Pop.	Note	%±
1860	3,856		—
1870	4,369		13.3%
1880	5,837		33.6%
1890	5,612		−3.9%
1900	5,442		−3.0%
1910	4,686		−13.9%
1920	4,204		−10.3%
1930	3,502		−16.7%
1940	4,479		27.9%
1950	3,712		−17.1%
1960	3,590		−3.3%
1970	3,639		1.4%
1980	4,774		31.2%
1990	9,429		97.5%
2000	15,999		69.7%
2010	22,330		39.6%
2020	26,798		20.0%
2025 (est.)	35,365	▲	32.0%
U.S. Decennial Census; 1790-1960 1900-1990; 1990-2000 2010-2019 2020

=== Racial and ethnic composition ===
Dawson County, Georgia – Racial and ethnic composition Note: the US Census treats Hispanic/Latino as an ethnic category. This table excludes Latinos from the racial categories and assigns them to a separate category. Hispanics/Latinos may be of any race.
Race / Ethnicity (NH = Non-Hispanic)	Pop 1980	Pop 1990	Pop 2000	Pop 2010	Pop 2020	% 1980	% 1990	% 2000	% 2010	% 2020
White alone (NH)	4,730	9,301	15,429	20,847	23,544	99.08%	98.64%	96.44%	93.36%	87.86%
Black or African American alone (NH)	0	4	57	97	200	0.00%	0.04%	0.36%	0.43%	0.75%
Native American or Alaska Native alone (NH)	37	78	57	73	63	0.78%	0.83%	0.36%	0.33%	0.24%
Asian alone (NH)	3	7	51	124	235	0.06%	0.07%	0.32%	0.56%	0.88%
Native Hawaiian or Pacific Islander alone (NH)	x	x	5	8	14	x	x	0.03%	0.04%	0.05%
Other race alone (NH)	1	0	6	13	94	0.02%	0.00%	0.04%	0.06%	0.35%
Mixed race or Multiracial (NH)	x	x	140	248	1,043	x	x	0.88%	1.11%	3.89%
Hispanic or Latino (any race)	3	39	254	920	1,605	0.06%	0.41%	1.59%	4.12%	5.99%
Total	4,774	9,429	15,999	22,330	26,798	100.00%	100.00%	100.00%	100.00%	100.00%

=== 2020 census ===
As of the 2020 census, the county had a population of 26,798, 10,313 households, and 6,491 families. The median age was 44.3 years, with 20.0% of residents under the age of 18 and 20.0% of residents 65 or older.

For every 100 females there were 97.8 males, and for every 100 females age 18 and over there were 96.2 males age 18 and over.

30.6% of residents lived in urban areas, while 69.4% lived in rural areas.

The racial makeup of the county was 89.0% White, 0.8% Black or African American, 0.3% American Indian and Alaska Native, 0.9% Asian, 0.1% Native Hawaiian and Pacific Islander, 2.5% from some other race, and 6.4% from two or more races. Hispanic or Latino residents of any race comprised 6.0% of the population.

There were 10,313 households in the county, of which 28.7% had children under the age of 18 living with them and 21.0% had a female householder with no spouse or partner present. About 20.8% of all households were made up of individuals and 9.7% had someone living alone who was 65 years of age or older.

There were 11,926 housing units, of which 13.5% were vacant. Among occupied housing units, 80.7% were owner-occupied and 19.3% were renter-occupied. The homeowner vacancy rate was 1.7% and the rental vacancy rate was 8.6%.

Between 2021 and 2022, Dawson experienced a 5.8% growth in population, making it the fourth fastest growing county in the nation.

=== 2010 census ===
In 2010, median income for a household in the county was $51,128 and the median income for a family was $60,236. Males had a median income of $41,726 versus $31,978 for females. The per capita income for the county was $25,557. About 7.8% of families and 12.0% of the population were below the poverty line, including 16.0% of those under age 18 and 5.3% of those age 65 or over.

=== 2000 census ===
In 2000, the median income for a household in the county was estimated at $51,989, and for a family was estimated at $60,455. About 8.9% of families and 13.5% of the population were below the poverty line, including 16.0% of those under age 18 and 6.3% of those age 65 or over.

== Politics ==
Dawson County was the only county that supported Thomas Dewey in 1948 and then supported Adlai Stevenson II in 1952. As of the 2020s, Dawson County is a strongly Republican voting county, voting 81% for Donald Trump in 2024. For elections to the United States House of Representatives, Dawson County is part of Georgia's 9th congressional district, currently represented by Andrew Clyde. For elections to the Georgia State Senate, Dawson County is part of District 51. For elections to the Georgia House of Representatives, Dawson County is divided between District 7 and District 9.

United States presidential election results for Dawson County, Georgia
Year	Republican		Democratic		Third party(ies)	
Year	No.	%	No.	%	No.	%
1912	23	6.42%	170	47.49%	165	46.09%
1916	29	3.91%	440	59.30%	273	36.79%
1920	354	58.22%	254	41.78%	0	0.00%
1924	264	48.35%	279	51.10%	3	0.55%
1928	290	46.62%	332	53.38%	0	0.00%
1932	105	15.53%	567	83.88%	4	0.59%
1936	322	46.07%	377	53.93%	0	0.00%
1940	276	36.17%	484	63.43%	3	0.39%
1944	342	42.17%	469	57.83%	0	0.00%
1948	786	52.82%	660	44.35%	42	2.82%
1952	470	37.90%	770	62.10%	0	0.00%
1956	613	45.95%	721	54.05%	0	0.00%
1960	401	30.45%	916	69.55%	0	0.00%
1964	639	40.67%	932	59.33%	0	0.00%
1968	509	31.81%	246	15.38%	845	52.81%
1972	828	78.26%	230	21.74%	0	0.00%
1976	370	21.09%	1,384	78.91%	0	0.00%
1980	729	39.68%	1,072	58.36%	36	1.96%
1984	1,322	67.28%	643	32.72%	0	0.00%
1988	1,908	71.03%	761	28.33%	17	0.63%
1992	1,696	43.58%	1,399	35.95%	797	20.48%
1996	2,343	54.41%	1,434	33.30%	529	12.29%
2000	4,210	71.38%	1,458	24.72%	230	3.90%
2004	6,649	81.87%	1,407	17.33%	65	0.80%
2008	8,242	82.54%	1,632	16.34%	112	1.12%
2012	8,847	86.19%	1,241	12.09%	176	1.71%
2016	9,900	83.76%	1,448	12.25%	472	3.99%
2020	13,398	83.30%	2,486	15.46%	200	1.24%
2024	16,115	82.38%	3,350	17.13%	96	0.49%

United States Senate election results for Dawson County, Georgia2
Year	Republican		Democratic		Third party(ies)	
Year	No.	%	No.	%	No.	%
2020	13,217	83.00%	2,289	14.37%	418	2.62%
2020	12,159	84.50%	2,230	15.50%	0	0.00%

United States Senate election results for Dawson County, Georgia3
Year	Republican		Democratic		Third party(ies)	
Year	No.	%	No.	%	No.	%
2020	7,345	46.26%	1,506	9.48%	7,028	44.26%
2020	12,113	84.19%	2,274	15.81%	0	0.00%
2022	11,185	80.64%	2,277	16.42%	408	2.94%
2022	10,166	82.86%	2,103	17.14%	0	0.00%

Georgia Gubernatorial election results for Dawson County
Year	Republican		Democratic		Third party(ies)	
Year	No.	%	No.	%	No.	%
2022	12,010	85.92%	1,827	13.07%	141	1.01%

== Transportation ==
=== Major highways ===
- U.S. Route 19 / State Route 400
- State Route 9
- State Route 52
- State Route 53
- State Route 136
- State Route 183

=== Pedestrians and cycling ===
- Springer Mountain Trail

== Notable people ==
- Bill Elliott - NASCAR racer
- Chase Elliott - NASCAR racer
- Gober Sosebee - NASCAR racer
- Jerry Glanville - National Football League head coach, NASCAR driver
- Bill Goldberg - professional wrestler and actor
- Kevin Tanner - politician and commissioner of the Georgia Department of Behavioral Health and Developmental Disabilities
- Will Wade - politician and member of the Georgia House of Representatives

== See also ==
- National Register of Historic Places listings in Dawson County, Georgia
- List of counties in Georgia
