= Amicalola Falls =

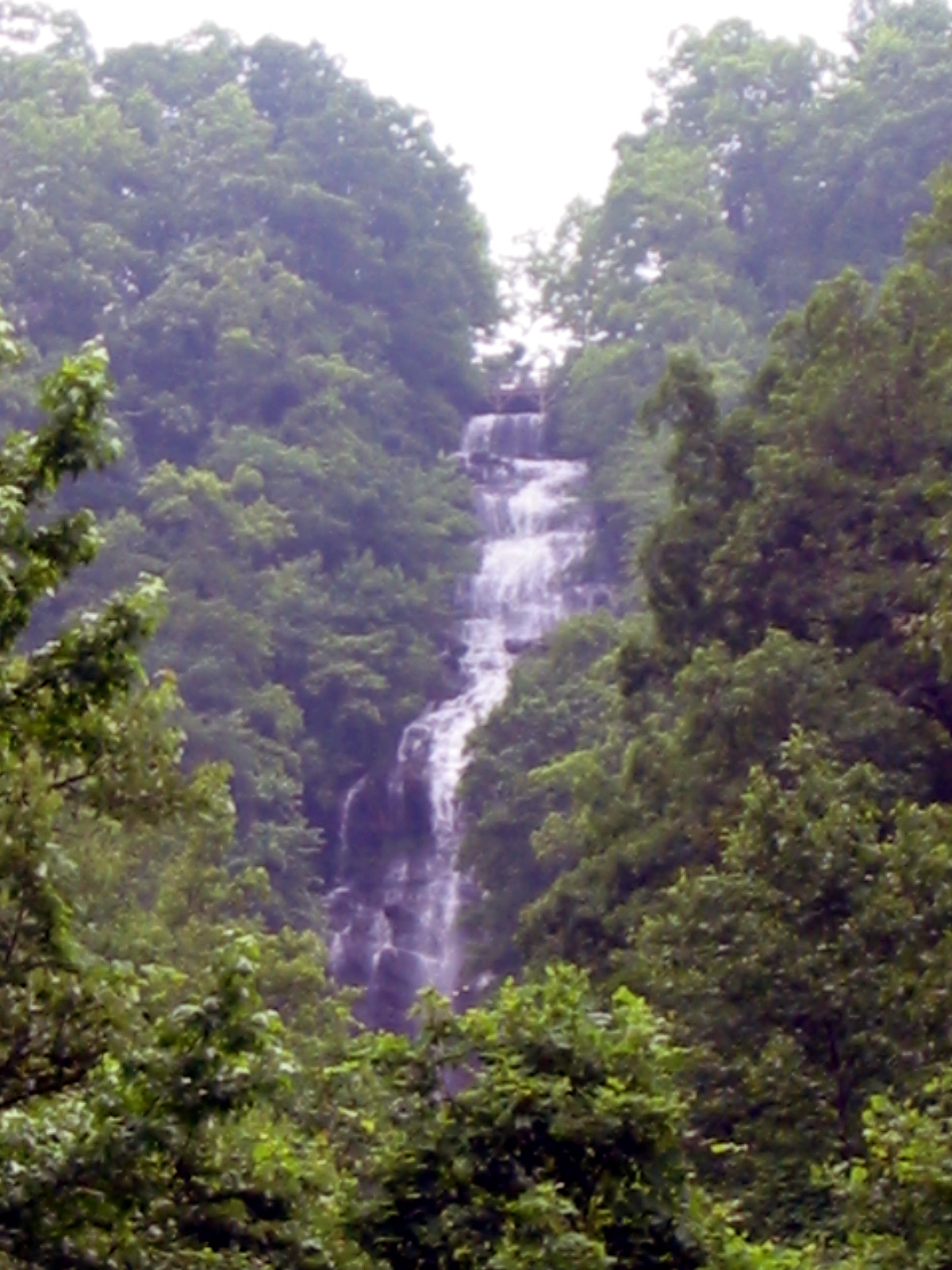
- (view from the 'Reflecting Pool' at bottom)

- Location within Georgia
- Location: Dawson County, Georgia, United States
- Coordinates: 34°34′3″N 84°14′40″W
- Type: Cascade
- Elevation: 1,900 ft (580 m)
- Total height: 729 feet (222 m)
- Watercourse: Little Amicalola Creek

Amicalola Falls is a 729-foot (222 m) waterfall on Amicalola Creek in Dawson County, Georgia, United States. It is the highest waterfall in Georgia and is considered to be one of the Seven Natural Wonders of Georgia. The name "Amicalola" is derived from a Cherokee language term ama uqwalelvyi, meaning "tumbling waters." The falls are the centerpiece of Amicalola Falls State Park.

== Gallery ==
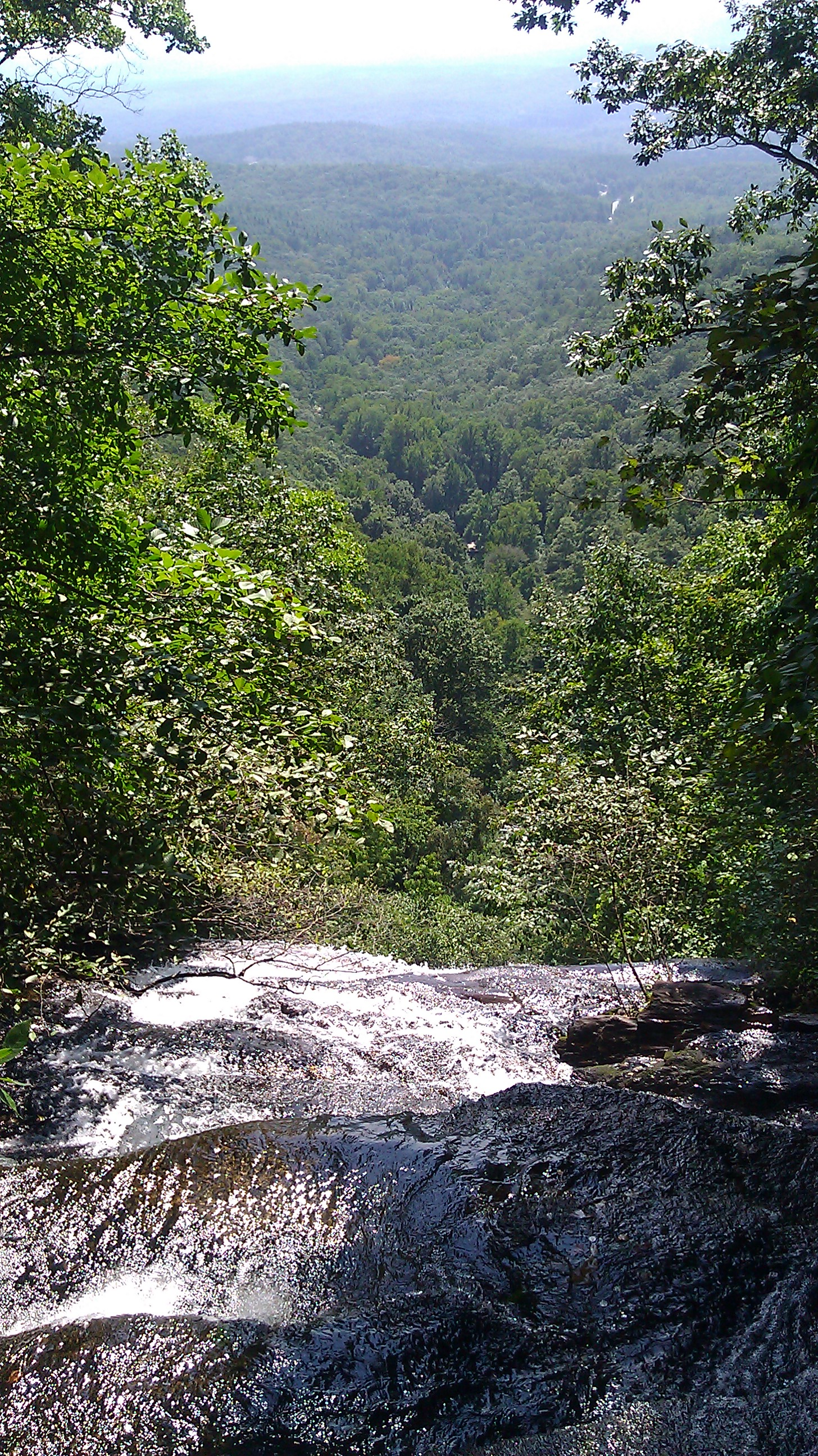
View of valley - looking out from top of falls

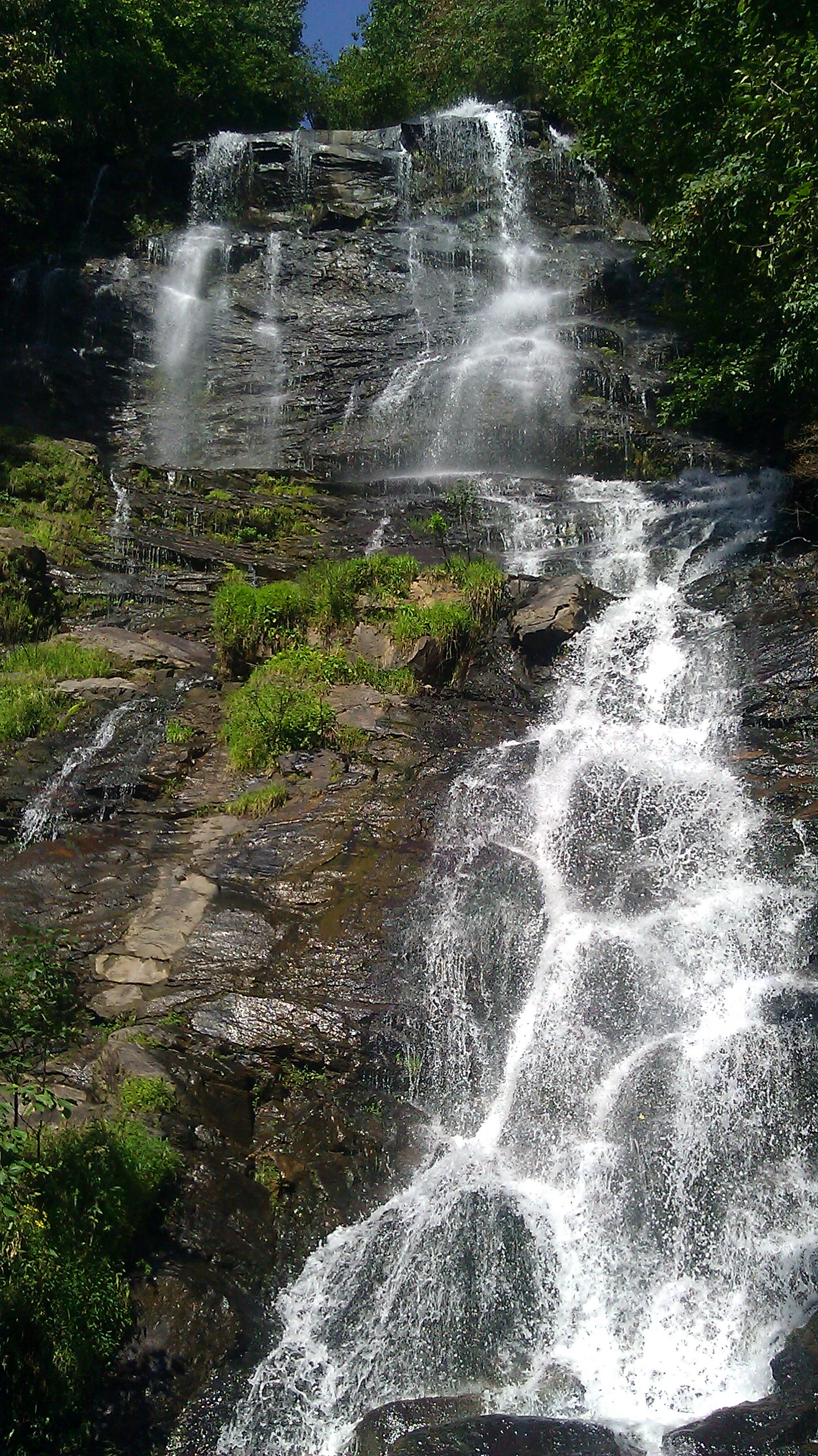
Main cascade - view looking up from hiking trail foot bridge

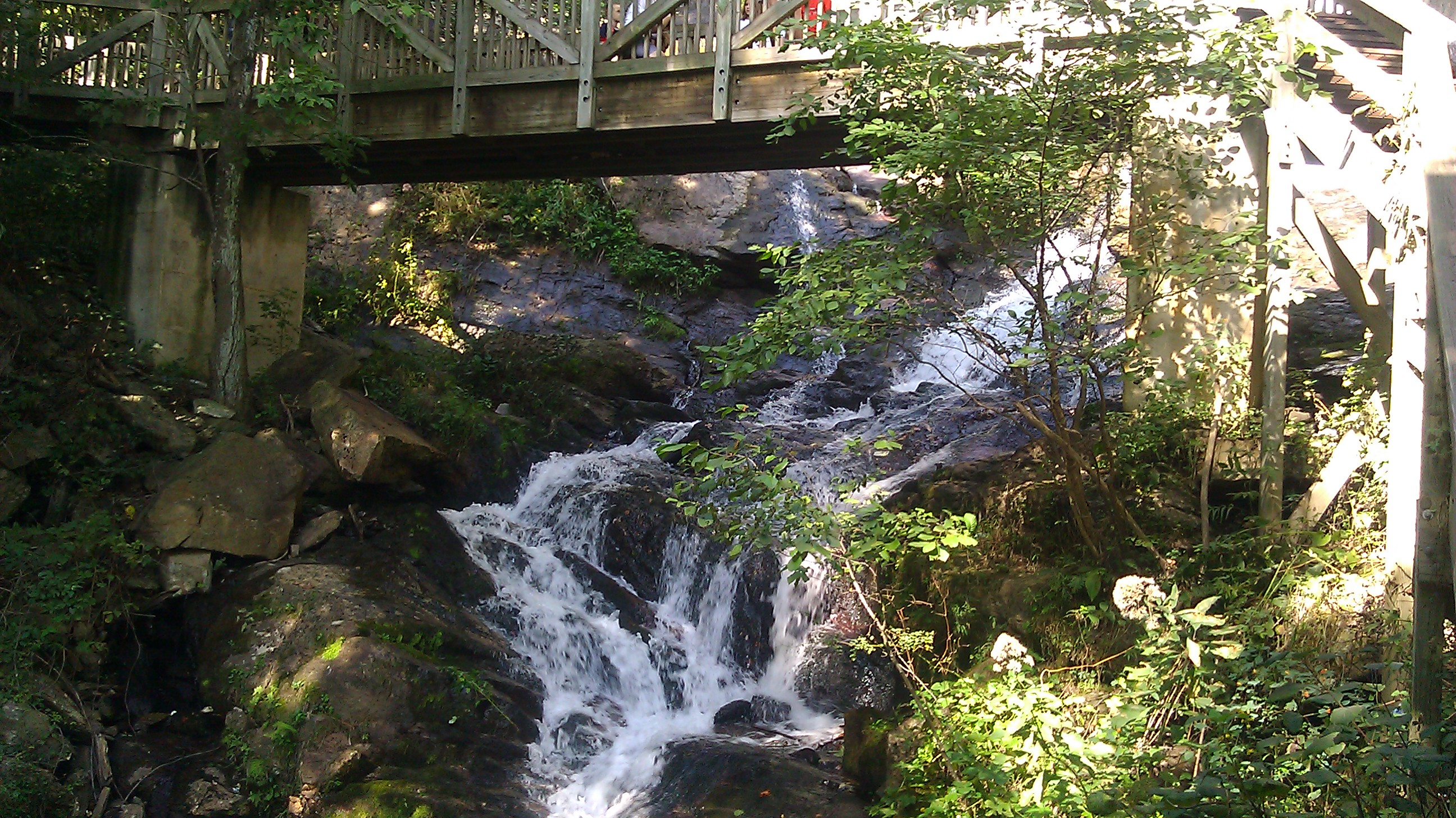
Lower cascade - view looking under hiking trail foot bridge

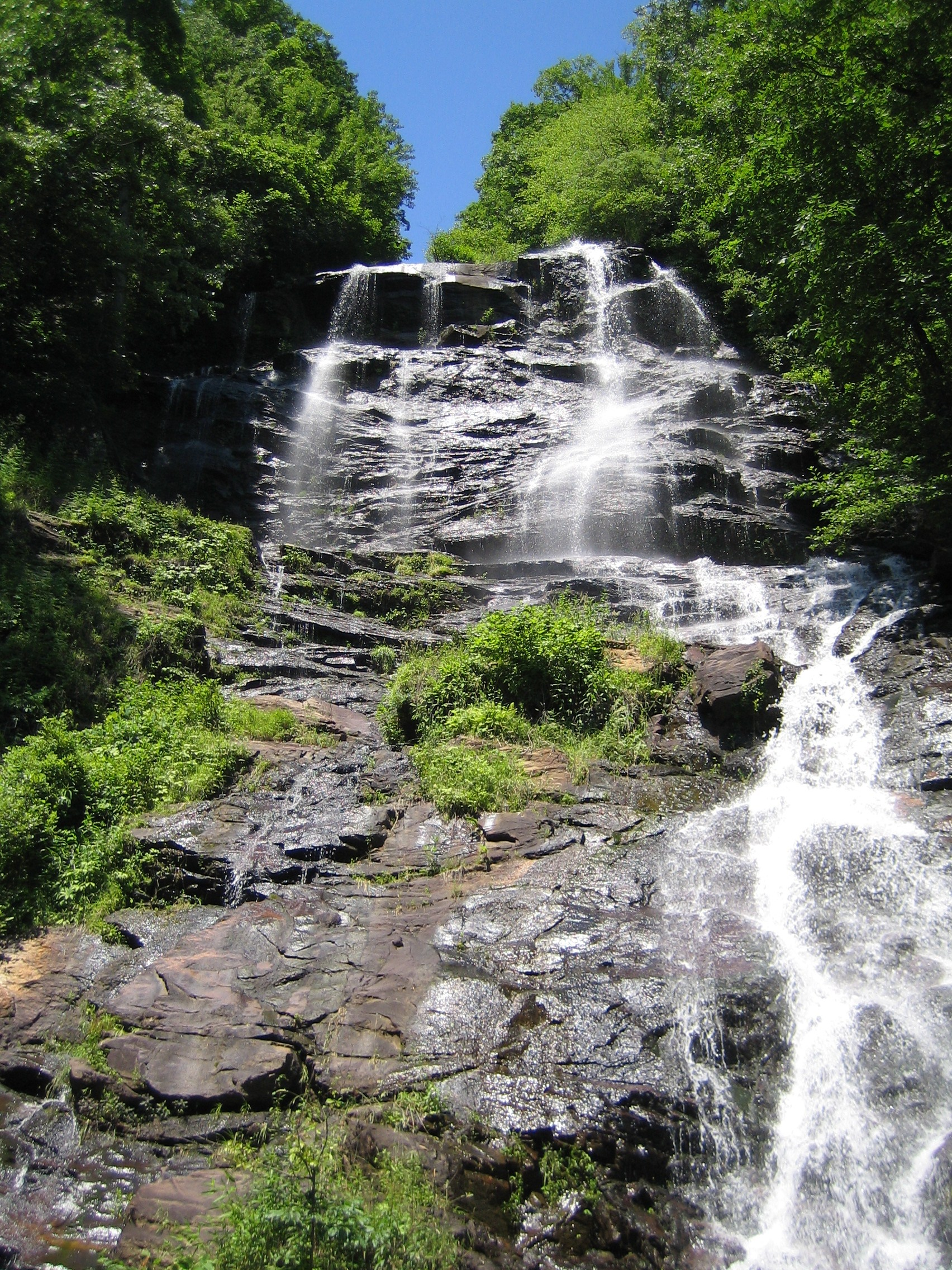
Closeup view

== See also ==
- List of waterfalls
- List of Waterfalls of Georgia (U.S. state)
