= Amicalola Creek =

Stream in Georgia, U.S.

Coordinates: 34°22′04″N 84°11′42″W

Amicalola Creek is a stream in the U.S. state of Georgia. It is a tributary to the Etowah River. Amicalola Falls, a tall waterfall on its course, lends its name to Amicalola Falls State Park.

"Amicalola" is a name derived from the Cherokee language meaning "tumbling waters". Many variant names have been recorded, including "Amakalola Creek", "Amicalola River", "Amicolola Creek", "Armacolola Creek", "Armi Caroli Creek", "Armicalola Creek", and "Ummah Caloloke Creek".
