= Karen Berger (writer) =

American writer (born 1959)

- Born: New York, N.Y.
- Citizenship: American
- Education: Northwestern University
- Occupation: Author
- Writing career
- Genres: Travel, Hiking, Adventure, Music
- Notable works: America's Great Hiking Trails, America's National Historic Trails, Great Hiking Trails of the World
- Notable awards: Lowell Thomas Travel Journalism Awards (gold), National Outdoor Book Award (silver)
- Website: www.karenberger.com

Karen Berger (born 1959) is an American writer, long-distance backpacker, and speaker. She is the author of adventure narratives, guidebooks, instructional books, and essays about the U.S. national scenic and historic trails, worldwide trails, and hiking and backpacking skills and techniques.

In 2000, she became the sixth woman to be recognized by the American Long Distance Hikers Association (West) for completing the Triple Crown of Hiking by hiking the Continental Divide Trail (1990), the Appalachian Trail (1994), and the Pacific Crest Trail (1997), a total of nearly 8,000 miles. She completed additional treks in the United States, Nepal, Japan, New Zealand, Kenya, Uganda, Tanzania, England, Scotland, France, Spain, the Netherlands, Belgium, Luxembourg, Italy, Switzerland, and Canada. These experiences, combined with her previous work experience as an editor, led to her career path as a writer specializing in hiking and adventure travel. She lives in the Berkshires of western Massachusetts.

== Biography ==
Berger was born in New York, New York. She grew up in New Rochelle, New York, and attended Northwestern University in Evanston, Illinois.

After graduating in 1980 with a Bachelor of Arts in music, Berger worked as an editor first for the Instrumentalist (a music magazine), and later, for Longman Financial Services Publishing. In between, she took gap years to travel, hike, write freelance articles, and teach in outdoor education programs. In 1987, she became a book acquisitions editor for Island Press, a Washington, D.C. based publisher specializing in environmental books. In 1988, she was married to Daniel R. Smith, a professor of history at Iona College in New Rochelle.

In 1990, Berger left Island Press and Smith took a sabbatical from Iona; the couple hiked the Continental Divide National Scenic Trail from Mexico to Canada. On their return, they co-authored Where the Waters Divide, a book about their journey, which received national attention. Reviews in regional media (San Francisco Chronicle, Flint Journal (Michigan), Rocky Mountain News,) and national media (The Wall Street Journal, E, the Environmental Magazine, Publishers Weekly) discussed how the book combined an adventure narrative with digressions into western American history, western water policy, grazing on public lands, fire suppression policy, and the Endangered Species Act.

With publication of Where the Waters Divide, Berger embarked on her career as an author specializing in hiking and adventure travel. She served as a technical consultant for Trailside, a PBS television show about outdoor adventure, for which she wrote three companion books published by W. W. Norton. She was a contributing editor for Backpacker magazine, where she wrote feature articles and three books published by the Mountaineers Books. Berger became the hiking expert at GORP.com, one of the first outdoor websites on the Internet to combine community forums with activity, skills, and destination content. She commissioned and edited articles, wrote feature stories, answered readers’ questions, and managed discussion groups. She was one of four writers featured in a chapter in the 1997 book edition of Writer's Market about how to be a successful freelancer; her career was also profiled in the American Society of Journalists and Authors publication, ASJA Monthly.

Berger and Smith collaborated on two more books but separated in 2003 and later divorced. Berger moved to the Berkshires of western Massachusetts, where she divided her time between writing and teaching piano. She wrote three books on music for Alpha Books' Complete Idiot's Guide series, as well as more books on hiking and adventure travel. Her articles for print and online periodicals were published in the Saturday Evening Post, NBC News, Outside, and others. From 2000 until 2009, she wrote the instructional “Outdoor Smarts” column for Boy Scouts of America's Scouting magazine. In 2012, she started the travel website, Buckettripper. Starting in 2014, she wrote a series of books for Rizzoli covering the 11 National Scenic Trails, the 19 National Historic Trails, and 38 major global trails. The series received national media coverage from such publications and organizations as USA Today, the Chicago Tribune,Frommer's, Forbes.com,Afar, the American Hiking Society, and the Partnership for the National Trails System, and was featured in best-of lists and in gift-book round-ups in The New York Times Book Review, in Associated Press-affiliated newspapers around the United States, and in People Magazine.

== Media and Speaking ==
Berger has appeared as a speaker for organizations such as the Continental Divide Trail Alliance (later reorganized as the Continental Divide Trail Coalition), the Appalachian Trail Conservancy, the Pacific Crest Trail Association, and the Smithsonian. In 2018, she added live piano music; her combination lecture-music-slide show was the opening night presentation at the annual meeting of the Appalachian Long Distance Hikers Association. As a result of her books, speaking, articles, and media about her activities, she became a resource for journalists writing about hiking-related subjects in such publications as The New York Times, Sports Illustrated, U.S.A. Today, and the San Francisco Chronicle. She has appeared as a guest on radio shows on NPR, the Martha Stewart Radio Network, and the Outside Radio Network, as well as local stations.

== Bibliography ==
=== Rizzoli Series ===
America's National Historic Trails

- Rizzoli, 2020. (ISBN 978-0-847-86885-8)
- Foreword by Ken Burns and Dayton Duncan, Photographs by Bart Smith

Great Hiking Trails of the World,

- Rizzoli, 2017. (ISBN 978-0-847-86093-7)
- Foreword by Bill McKibben

America's Great Hiking Trails

- Rizzoli, 2014. (ISBN 978-0-789-32741-3)
- Wandern in den USA, German edition published by National Geographic, 2014. (ISBN 978-3-86690-432-3)
- Foreword by Bill McKibben, Photography by Bart Smith
- New York Times Travel Books Bestseller

=== Outdoor Guidebooks and Instructional Books ===
Knots

- Adventure Publications, 2019. (ISBN 978-1-59193-899-6)

The Pacific Crest Trail: A Hiker's Companion (with Daniel R. Smith)

- Countryman Press (W.W. Norton imprint)
- 2nd edition, 2014. (ISBN 978-1-58157-212-4)
- 1st edition, 2000. (ISBN 978-0-88150-431-6)

Backpacking and Hiking

- DK Eyewitness Companions, 2005.
- US edition (ISBN 978-0-75660-946-7), UK edition (ISBN 978-1-40530-252-4)
- Translated into Danish, Norwegian, Swedish, Dutch, German, Italian, Spanish, French, Hungarian, Czech, and Slovak

Be Prepared: Hiking and Backpacking

- DK, with Boy Scouts of America, 2008. (ISBN 978-0-75663-522-0)

Hiking the Triple Crown

- Mountaineers Books, 2001. (ISBN 978-0-898-86760-2)

=== Backpacker Magazine Series ===
Hiking Light Handbook

- Mountaineers Books, 2004. (ISBN 978-0-89886-961-3)

More Everyday Wisdom

- Mountaineers Books, 2002. (ISBN 978-0-89886-899-9)

Everyday Wisdom

- Mountaineers Books, 1997. (ISBN 978-0-89886-523-3)

=== Trailside (PBS TV Show) Companion Books ===
Scuba Diving

- W.W. Norton, 2000. (ISBN 978-0-39331-944-6)

Advanced Backpacking

- W.W. Norton, 1998. (ISBN 978-0393317695)

Hiking and Backpacking

- W. W. Norton, 1995. reissued 2003. (ISBN 978-0-39331-334-5)

=== Outdoor Literature ===
Where the Waters Divide (with Daniel R. Smith)

- Paperback by Countryman Press (W.W. Norton imprint), 1997. (ISBN 978-0-88150-403-3
- Hardcover by Harmony Books (Crown imprint), 1993. (ISBN 978-0-51758-804-8)

Along the Pacific Crest Trail (with Daniel R. Smith, Photography by Bart Smith)

- Westcliffe Publishing, 1998.(ISBN 978-1-56579-277-7)

=== Music Books ===
The Complete Idiot's Guide to Piano Exercises

- Alpha-Penguin, 2011. (ISBN 978-1-61564-049-2)

The Complete Idiot's Guide to Teaching Music on Your Own

- Alpha-Penguin, 2010. (ISBN 978-1-59257-961-7)

The Pocket Idiot's Guide to Piano Chords

- Alpha-Penguin, 2006. (ISBN 978-1-59257-459-9)

=== Anthology Contributions ===
Journeys of a Lifetime, National Geographic, 2007. (ISBN 978-1-42620-125-7)

- "Heli-hiking in British Columbia
- "Captain Cook's Polynesia
- "Lewis and Clark"

Appalachian Trail Reader

- Anthology compiled by David Emblidge
- Oxford University Press, 1997. (ISBN 978-0-19510-090-7)
- Contribution: "Trail Days in Damascus"

You Can Do It! The Merit Badge Handbook for Grown Up Girls

- by Lauren Catuzzi Grandcolas,
- Chronicle Books, 2005. (ISBN 978-0-81184-635-6)
- Contribution: “Commune with Nature

== Awards ==
National Outdoor Book Award, Silver in 2021 in “Journeys” for America's National Historic Trails

Lowell Thomas Travel Journalism Award, Gold in 2015 for “Best Travel Book” for America's Great Hiking Trails

Foreword Reviews/Indie Book of the Year Awards

- Gold in 2020 for “History” for America's National Historic Trails
- Gold in 2017 for “Nature” for Great Hiking Trails of the World
- Gold in 2014 for “Adventure and Recreation” for America's Great Hiking Trails

North American Travel Journalists Association: 11 awards in 2012 and 2013.
