= Roadwalking =

Roadwalking is a thru-hiking term, indicating a walk on a road instead of a trail. It sometimes provides an easier way to reach a further point on the trail, for example by avoiding steep mountain ascents. A roadwalk is sometimes an unavoidable part of some long trail systems, such as the Appalachian Trail, North Country Trail and the partially unfinished Continental Divide Trail in the United States, and the Coast to Coast Walk in the United Kingdom.

== Safety and planning ==
Roadwalking can present different hazards from trail walking, particularly because hikers may be exposed to vehicle traffic, limited shoulders, and fewer opportunities for camping or water access. Long-distance trail organizations advise hikers to plan ahead for road sections and to use extra caution near roads and trailheads.

Some long-distance trail organizations also note that roadwalks are a routine part of route planning on certain trails.
