= Francis Tapon =

American writer

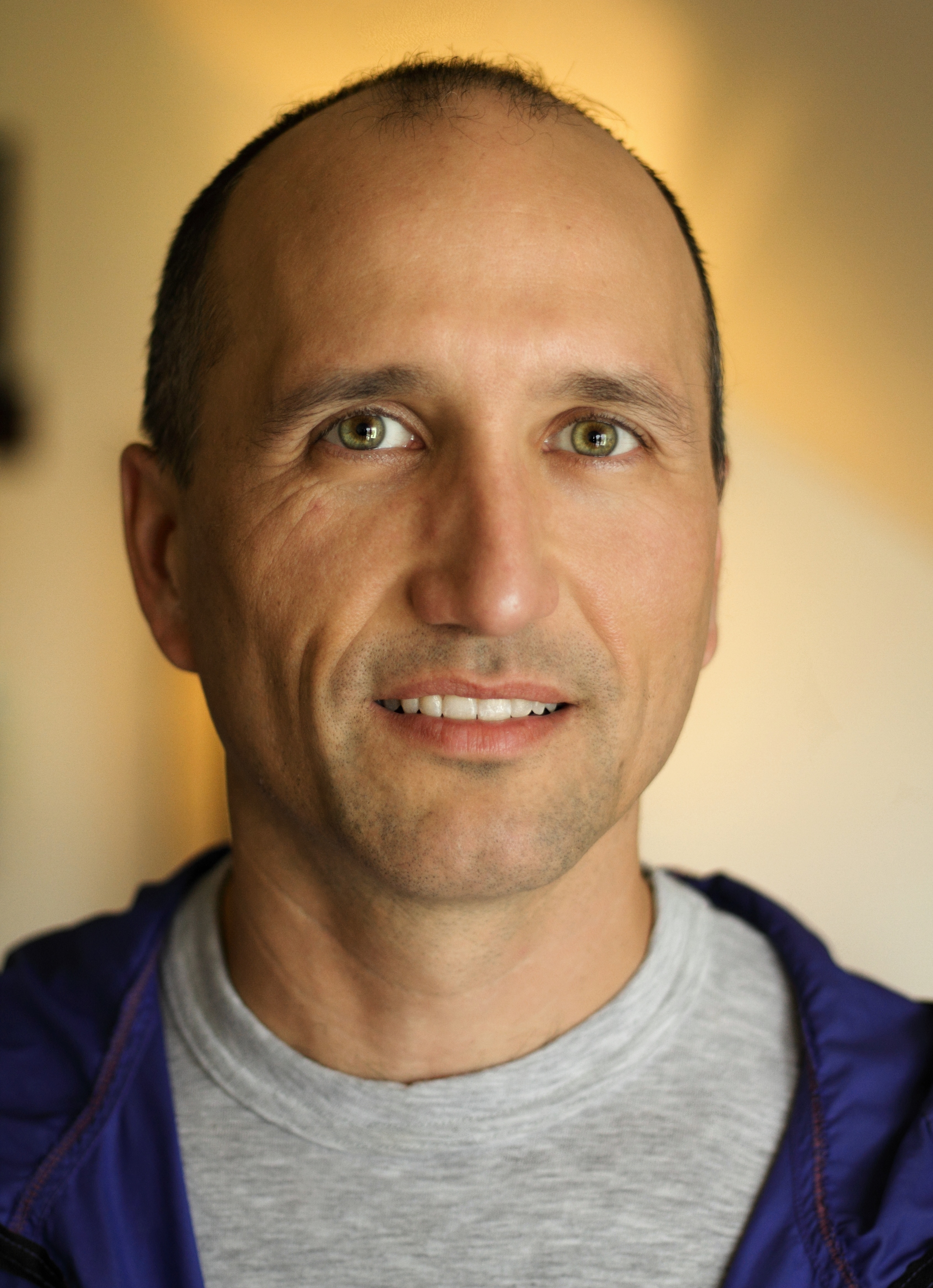
- Tapon in 2012
- Born: 10 March 1970 (age 56); San Francisco, California, United States
- Education: Amherst College (B.A.); Harvard Business School (MBA)
- Occupations: Author, nomad, public speaker, life coach
- Writing career
- Notable works: Hike Your Own Hike; The Hidden Europe
- Website: francistapon.com

Francis Tapon (born March 10, 1970) is an author, global nomad, and public speaker. He has walked across the United States four times via its three major mountain ranges. He also walked across Spain twice. He was the first person to do a round-trip backpacking the Continental Divide Trail. In addition, he thru-hiked the Pacific Crest Trail and Appalachian Trail southbound. He has traveled to over 100 countries of the world. He is the author of the self-help travelogue Hike Your Own Hike and the travel narrative The Hidden Europe: What Eastern Europeans Can Teach Us. He climbed the highest peaks in all 54 African countries from 2013 to 2018. In 2019, he was inducted into the California Outdoors Hall of Fame.

== Early life and career ==
Tapon's mother is from Chile and his father was from France. Tapon was born in San Francisco, where he went to the French American International School until 10th grade, and then graduated from Lick-Wilmerding High School.

He earned a Bachelor of Arts cum laude in Religion from Amherst College in 1992. He worked in Latin America for Hitachi Data Systems. In 1997, he received his MBA from Harvard Business School.

After Harvard, he co-founded a Silicon Valley robotic vision company that was covered by The New York Times. Later, he consulted for Microsoft for 18 months. In 2006, he became a full-time travel writer.

== Travels ==
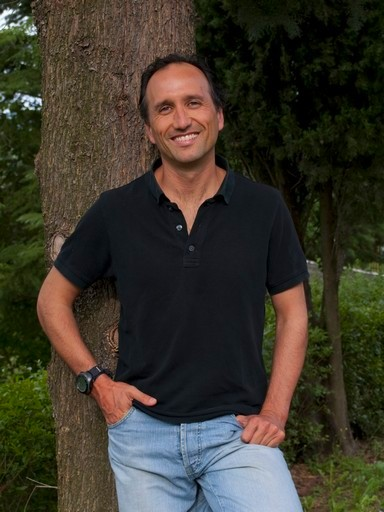
Tapon in Slovenia, August 2010

Below is a chronology of Tapon's most notable travel experiences, which inspired his two books.

In 2001, he hiked the Appalachian Trail. In 2004, he visited all the countries in Eastern Europe. In 2006, he backpacked the Pacific Crest Trail.

In 2007, he became the first person to walk from Mexico to Canada and back to Mexico along the Continental Divide Trail. This seven-month journey spanned over 5,600 miles. Francis took the most circuitous, scenic, high, difficult route north and while returning south took the more expedient route on the way down. He hiked ultralight since his pack, without food and water, weighed under 6 lbs (less than 3 kg). National Geographic listed Francis Tapon's round trip on the Continental Divide Trail among the most notable feats of 2007.

In 2009, he walked across Spain twice: once by traversing the Pyrenees from the Mediterranean Sea to the Atlantic Ocean, and then by hiking El Camino de Santiago.

In 2008–2011, he visited over 40 European countries, including all the Eastern European ones. He focused on finding Eastern European innovations.

In 2012, he summed up his travels to date and shared his lessons in his TEDx talk entitled, "How and Why Travel Transforms You." It has over 100,000 views.

In March 2013, he entered Morocco and began a five-year trip to all 54 African countries. He never left the African continent. Half way through his trip, he met and married a Cameroonian, Rejoice Tapon, who traveled 31 of African countries with him.

In October 2018, Tapon returned to a TEDx stage. He had just returned from 5.5 years of nonstop overland travel through all 54 African countries. Tapon shared a story about an African girl who was a "black sheep" in her society and what we can learn from it.

He returned to the United States in 2018. He plans to write his third book based on the experience. He filmed extensively and has raised over $24,000 to produce a pilot TV episode by November 2014. Amazon.com and Lincoln Mercury selected him as the best example of someone who is fulfilling the dream of traveling the world.

In January 2019, he was inducted in the California Outdoors Hall of Fame, which includes John Muir and Ansel Adams.

== Books ==
Tapon is the author of the WanderLearn Series, which is a series of books about his adventures. He has written two books so far:

- Tapon, Francis (2006), Hike Your Own Hike: 7 Life Lessons from Backpacking Across America, 351 pages, ISBN 978-0-9765812-0-8.
- Tapon, Francis (2012), The Hidden Europe: What Eastern Europeans Can Teach Us, 736 pages, ISBN 978-0976581222.

He also wrote two chapters in Hikers' Stories From the Appalachian Trail, edited by Kathryn Fulton, ISBN 978-0811712835 (2012) Stackpole Books. The chapters are entitled "The Final Stretch" and "A Thru-hiker's Motivation: Not Enlightenment, Just Ice Cream."
