= Continental Divide Trail Coalition =

Non-profit organization in the US

- Abbreviation: CDTC
- Formation: June 2012
- Type: Nonprofit organization
- Purpose: Trail completion, protection, and promotion
- Headquarters: Colorado, United States
- Region served: New Mexico, Colorado, Wyoming, Idaho, Montana

The Continental Divide Trail Coalition (CDTC) is a Colorado-based organization that works to complete, promote, and protect the Continental Divide National Scenic Trail (abbreviated as CDT or CDNST). The CDT is used by hikers, equestrians, and (in some sections) mountain bikers, and runs approximately 3,000-miles along the Continental Divide from Mexico to Canada. The trail crosses five states: New Mexico, Colorado, Wyoming, Idaho, and Montana, and is considered one of the three Triple Crown of Hiking trails in the United States (the others are the Appalachian Trail and the Pacific Crest Trail).

The Continental Divide Trail Coalition is the official non-profit organization that works under a memorandum of understanding signed in 2020 with the U.S.D.A. Forest Service, the Bureau of Land Management, and the National Park Service in 2020. CDTC activities include stewardship and trail protection advocacy, community building in towns along the corridor of the CDT, and the production and dissemination of trail information – via publications, its website, and in-person events throughout the region – for hikers, backpackers, and other outdoor recreationists.

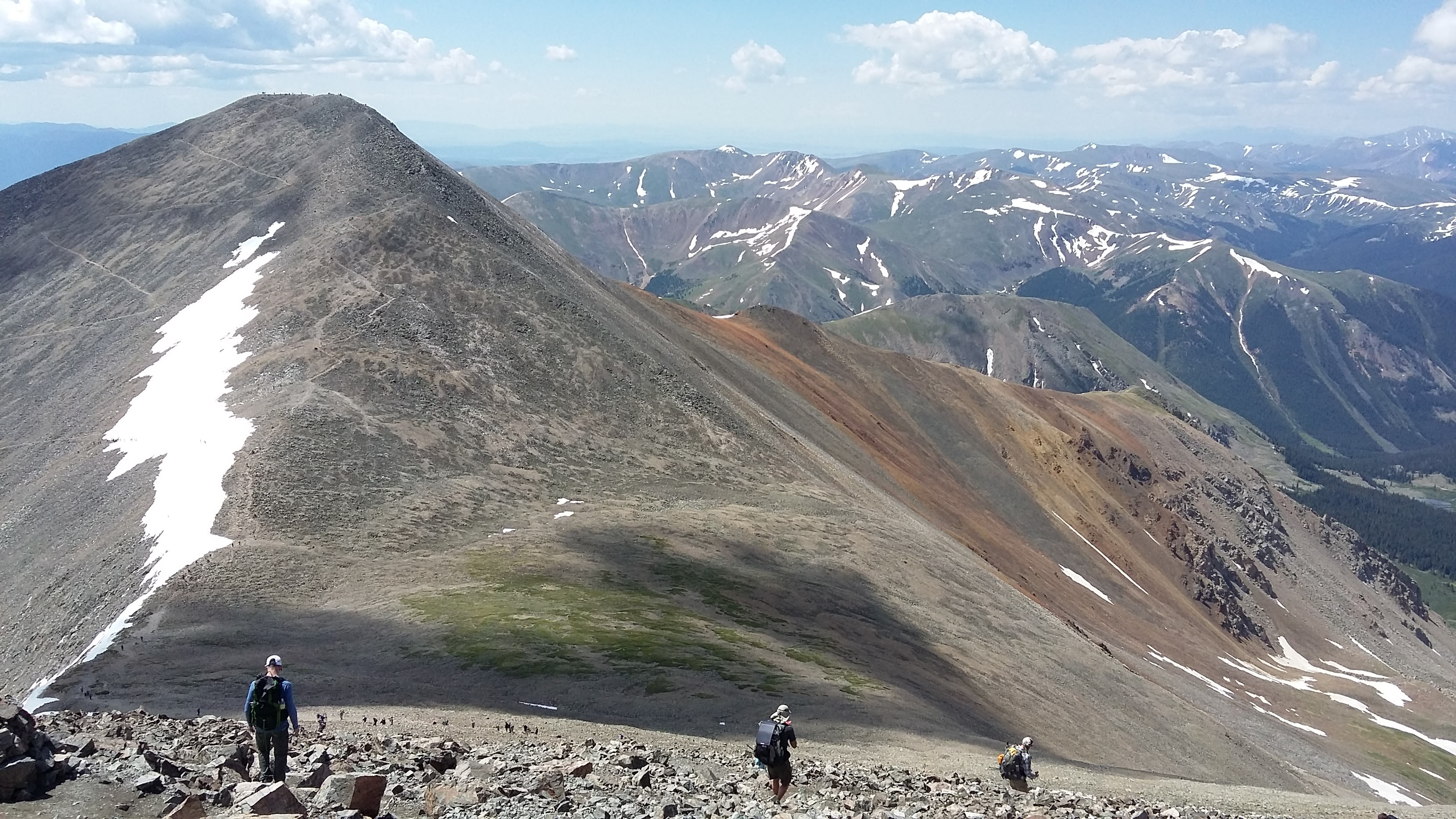
The Continental Divide Trail in Colorado

== History ==
The Continental Divide National Scenic Trail was established as a National Scenic Trail in 1978, when the U.S. Congress approved the expansion of the National Trails System Act of 1968. The National Trails System Act of 1968 established the first two national scenic trails (the Appalachian and the Pacific Crest trails) and designated other trails, including the CDT, to be studied for possible later inclusion in the system. At the time the CDT gained standing as a national scenic trail, it was not one unified trail. Rather, it existed as a hodgepodge of often unconnected and unmarked trails, many of which could only be linked together by cross-country travel or by walking on roads.

The Continental Divide Trail Society was the first organization to advocate for a unified continuous trail to be built along the Continental Divide, or, where that was impossible due to geography or land ownership, as close to the geographic divide as possible. Founded by Baltimore-based trail enthusiast Jim Wolf in 1978, the CDTS primarily served the needs of potential hikers by publishing early guidebooks, serving as a clearing house for information, and advocating for its preferred routes to the U.S.D.A. Forest Service, the lead agency charged with overall management of the trail.

However, the trail needed an organization to coordinate the efforts of trail volunteers and maintainers and to work with local communities. In 1995, the Continental Divide Trail Alliance was formed; in 1999, a Memorandum of Understanding was signed in Washington, D.C. establishing the CDTA as the leading non-governmental organization to partner with the U.S. government agencies in working toward the completion of the CDT. In 2012, the organization was disbanded subsequent to funding issues. The CDTC was formed in June, 2012, with the goal of replacing the CDTA and working toward completing, promoting, and protecting the Continental Divide National Scenic Trail; in 2020, with the signing of a new Memorandum of Understanding, the CDTC took on the official partnership role formerly held by the CDTA.

== Mission and advocacy ==
The CDTC's mission is to complete, protect, and promote the CDT. To encourage support for the trail, it creates reaches out to its stakeholders—a broad, geographically distanced conglomeration of local businesses, land managers, hikers, conservationists, trail community supporters, and other outdoor enthusiasts. In New Mexico, it worked with the New Mexico State Land Office to make it easier for CDT hikers and equestrians to obtain permits needed to cross state trust lands. In Wyoming, it worked to relocate a segment of trail in order to highlight Wyoming's mountain scenery. Early in 2022, The CDTC announced that it received a $150,000 grant from the Great Outdoors Colorado Board to fund a fellowship program that would support community engagement and trail stewardship by providing on-the-job training that would prepare young people for careers in the outdoors.

Trail completion has been a long-term issue facing the Continental Divide Trail. Like other multi-thousand-mile trails, which often take decades to finish, CDT advocates have faced issues such as trail continuity, relations with land owners suspicious of government projects, multiple-use debates, trail routing and relocation issues necessitated by land-use conflicts, development, and wildfires; and lack of volunteers to create and maintain trail. The CDT has partnered with corporate sponsors. Corporate sponsorships can include adopting a trail segment and partnering with the Forest Service, the coalition, and volunteers, to complete it. They also include organizing fundraising events in which the general public hike and trek to raise money for the CDTC. Support also comes from fundraising efforts by individual backpackers (often long-distance hikers) who are committed to the trail.

== CDTC Gateway Communities ==
To create mutually supportive relationships with local communities, the CDTC has created a Gateways Communities program, which publicizes the positive economic impact of proximity to an internationally recognized long-distance hiking trail. It participates at the local level to bring attention to the trail as a resource that benefits local businesses, local recreationists, and visitors. Partnership activities between the CDTC and the Gateway Communities depend on the needs of both the trail and the community: Projects include re-routing segments of trail to new and better locations, obtaining easements, organizing volunteers to build and maintain trail segments, and supporting hikers. For example, volunteers in Lake City, Colorado, provide free rides to hikers, and benefit from the money spent by hikers on lodging and food, and on gear sales and repair, shuttle and transportation services, and guide services. Calling the CDT "one of the most significant trail systems in the world," South Fork, Colorado, organizes volunteer projects and donates bicycles for hikers to use to get around town when they are resupplying.

== Hiker education and support ==
The CDT is the most remote and least used of the so-called Triple Crown Trails. In 2021, the CDTC estimated there were approximately 400 attempts to thru-hike in 2021. (A thru-hike is a hike of the entire length of the trail within a calendar year. The Appalachian Trail Conservancy estimates that approximately 4000 people attempted to thru-hike the AT in 2019; the Pacific Crest Trail Association reports that in 2019, nearly 1,200 thru-hikers completed the PCT.)

The CDTC supports long-distance backpackers with a website, publications, and maps that provide information necessary for planning a trip (of any length), including current information about water sources and trail conditions. It also organizes a shuttle service to the remote southern terminus of the trail in the spring (when northbound thru-hikers start their journeys), and in the fall (for those finishing a southbound hike). Its volunteers maintain water caches in some long waterless stretches of the trail. The organization also hosts an annual "trail days" celebration at the beginning of the thru-hiking season. This so-called "kick-off" is a combination of a community celebration and educational event in which hikers can meet and share information before they embark on their journeys.

In 2020, the CDTC asked long-distance backpackers to postpone their hikes because of the COVID-19 pandemic, concerned that hikers could spread the disease to rural communities that had limited medical facilities.

As a result of continuing concerns about COVID-19, in both 2020 and 2021 the CDTC's trail days celebration was virtual. While the original in-person event had been scheduled for Silver City, New Mexico, the virtual event was publicized along the entire length of the trail, from New Mexico to Colorado to Montana, and was available via online streaming.
