= Brian Robinson (hiker) =

American hiker

"Flyin' Brian" Robinson
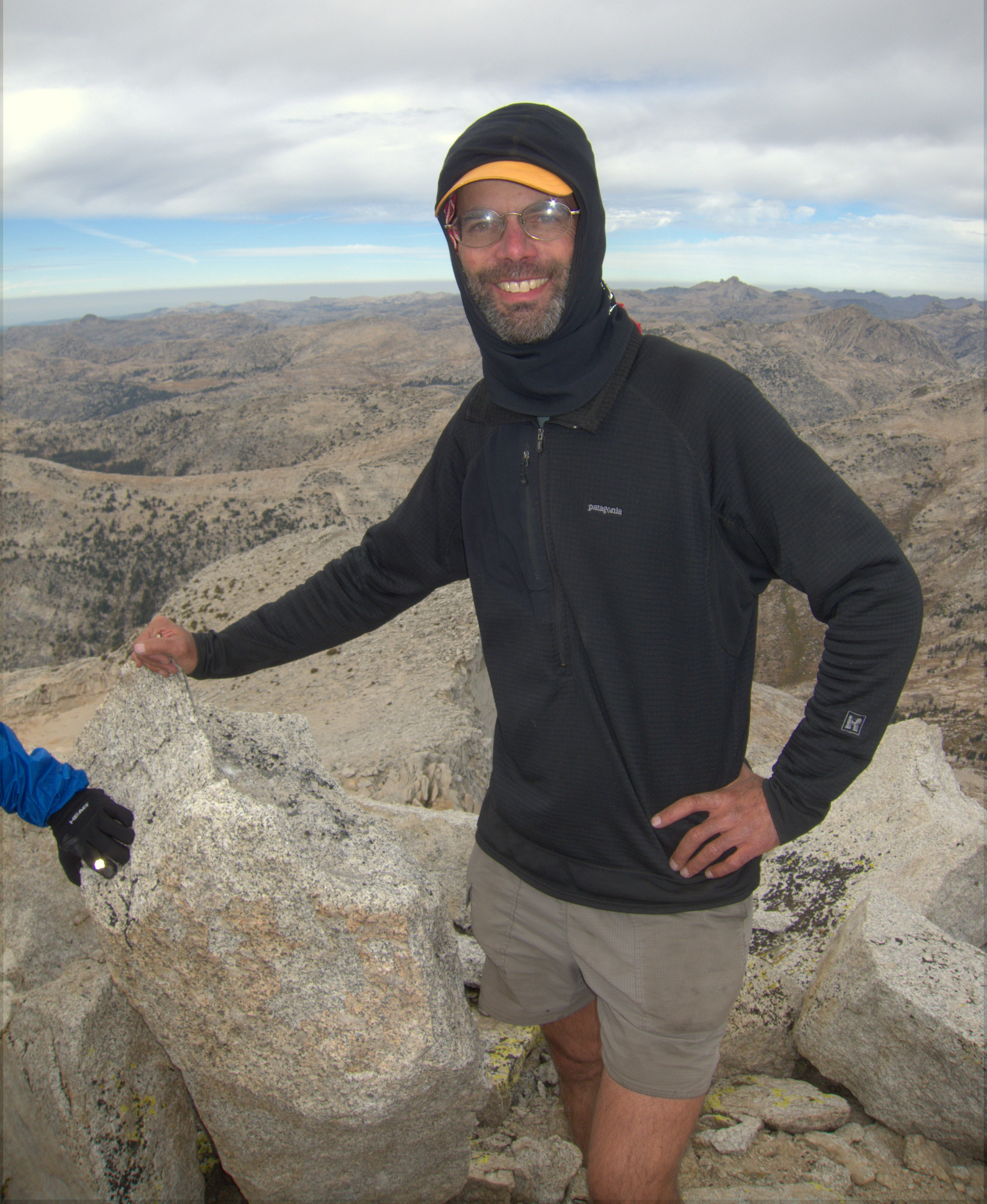
- Brian Robinson at Yosemite's Mt Whorl, 12,033 ft

Personal information
- Full name: Brian Robinson
- Nickname: Flyin' Brian
- Nationality: American

Sport
- Sport: Running
- Event(s): Trail Running, Ultramarathon

Achievements and titles
- Personal best: Hiker Triple Crown (2001, WR) Barkley Marathons: 55:42:27 (WR: 2008-2011)

Brian Robinson is a competitive distance hiker and long-distance runner, holding multiple world-firsts and ultramarathon world records. Robinson was the first person to hike the Triple Crown of Hiking (Pacific Crest Trail, Appalachian Trail, and Continental Divide Trail) in one year, a total distance of over 7,000 miles.

== Hiker Triple Crown ==
In 2000, Robinson decided to take a six-month leave of absence from his job at Compaq and attempt the Pacific Crest Trail with his father Roy, who himself is a seasoned backpacker. Midway through the trip, Brian realized the Hiker Triple Crown might be achievable in a single year.

Robinson completed the Triple Crown with support from his friends and family. Support for his pursuit ranged from notes of encouragement in trail registers, to regular food resupplies mailed to strategic points along the route, and even a complete equipment replacement by a near-stranger after his backpack, containing most of his original gear, was lost. His father maintained a website with frequent updates from his daily journal and the most current photographs. During Robinson's travail, he overcame several emotional obstacles including having his pack misrouted during a bus transfer, discovering on September 12, 2001 that the US had been attacked, and encountering a woman that might have been "the one." Because of his rapid hiking pace, his fellow through-hikers began calling him "Flyin' Brian", a trail name he continues to use.

== Ultramarathons ==
In the years following his calendar-year Hiker Triple Crown, Robinson became an active ultramarathoner. He has completed several 100-mile races, including the Western States 100 and the Hardrock Hundred Mile Endurance Run. In 2008 he set the record at the Barkley Marathons, a grueling 100+ mile course in Frozen Head State Park, Tennessee. His record time was held for four years, until surpassed in 2012. A feature in the Washington Post chronicles his attempt to finish the race in 2007.
