= Bart Smith =

- Citizenship: American
- Occupation: Photographer
- Writing career
- Genres: Hiking, Outdoors, National Trails, National Parks
- Notable works: America's Great Hiking Trails, America’s National Historic Trails
- Notable awards: Gold from Lowell Thomas Travel Journalism Awards program, Silver from National Outdoor Book Award
- Website: www.bartsmithphotography.com

Bart Smith (born 1959) is an outdoor photographer who concentrates on documenting America's National Trails System. Over the course of more than 25 years, he became the first person to hike and photograph all of the 11 national scenic trails and to traverse (mostly by hiking, but when necessary, by sailing, paddling, and bush plane) all of the 19 national historic trails. The 30 national trails go through all 50 states, with a total mileage of more than 50,000 miles.

Smith's photographs of the national trail system, along with other notable trails, call attention to the diversity of American trails, the landscapes they cross, and the need to protect them. He is the principal photographer of 10 books, and has contributed to many others.

== Biography ==
Smith's interest in hiking began with childhood Boy Scout trips. He told Backpacker magazine that he remembers becoming interested in the idea of long-distance trails when his Boy Scout troop crossed the Pacific Crest Trail and he learned that it was possible to walk all the way from his home in the Pacific Northwest to Mexico.

Starting in 1992, Smith spent five years hiking the Pacific Crest Trail and honing his skills as an outdoor photographer. In 1997, he successfully submitted a book proposal featuring his PCT photographs to Westcliffe Books, then a Colorado-based publisher of fine nature and outdoor photography books. (Westcliffe is now an imprint of Trails Books, which is itself an imprint of Denver-based Bower House.) The book, Along the Pacific Crest Trail, with text by Karen Berger and Daniel R. Smith, was published in 1998.

For his next book, Smith hiked the Appalachian Trail and partnered with Earl Shaffer, the Appalachian Trail's first thru-hiker, who wrote the text. The Appalachian Trail: Calling me Back to the Hills was published in 2002. Smith then hiked the Florida Trail, the Ice Age Trail, and finally, the rest of the national scenic trails. The total distance was more than 17,500 miles, according to Steve Elkinton, then the National Trails System program leader for the National Park Service. Having completed the national scenic trails, Smith then decided to hike, or, where hiking was not possible, travel by water or air, over the national historic trails network.

Smith's work and travels have been covered in and published by national and international media, including Backpacker, Smithsonian, Outside, and The Guardian.

Regional media and trail organizations closely followed Smith as he ticked off the trails in his quest to hike the entire national trails system. Media coverage focused on his overall project, as well as on the details of the trips (gear, packweight, logistics, dangers, camera equipment) and the characteristics and importance of individual trails. Examples include the Oregon Trail (Idaho State Journal ), the Lewis and Clark Trail, (Gateway Arch Park Foundation and the Helena (Montana) Independent Record), the El Camino Real de los Tejas (My San Antonio), the Santa Fe Trail (Santa Fe New Mexican and Examiner), and the Nez Perce Trail (Billings Gazette).

== Speaking and Trail Advocacy ==
In addition to his photography, Smith is a frequent speaker for hiking conferences, as well as at venues for the general public, ranging from bookstores to the Smithsonian Institution. His books, media coverage of his travels, and his lectures have brought attention to the diversity of the American trails network and the need to protect the trails and the landscapes they cross.

== Bibliography ==
America's National Historic Trails

- Rizzoli, 2020. (ISBN 978-0-847-86885-8)
- Text by Karen Berger, foreword by Ken Burns and Dayton Duncan
- Silver National Outdoor Book Award Winner, in Journeys; Gold Foreword/Indie Award Winner in History

Hiking Trails of the Pacific Northwest

- Rizzoli, 2020. (ISBN 978-0-847-86766-0)
- Text by Craig Romano and William Sullivan

The AT: Hiking the People's Path

- Rizzoli, 2017. (ISBN 978-0-847-85917-7)

The Pacific Crest Trail

- Rizzoli, 2016. (ISBN 978-0-847-86093-7)
- Text by Mark Larabee, foreword by Cheryl Strayed

America's Great Hiking Trails

- Rizzoli, 2014. (ISBN 978-0-789-32741-3)
- Text by Karen Berger, foreword by Bill McKibben
- Published in German as Wandern in den USA by National Geographic, 2014. (ISBN 978-3-86690-432-3)
- Gold Lowell Thomas Awards Winner, Gold Foreword/Indie Award Winner in Adventure
- New York Times Travel Books Bestseller

The Pony Express: An Illustrated History

- Two Dot, 2009. (ISBN 978-0-762-76202-6)
- Text by Carol Guthrie

Along Wisconsin's Ice Age Trail

- University of Wisconsin, 2008. (ISBN 978-0-299-22664-0)
- Text edited by Eric and Andrew Hanson III

Along the Florida Trail

- Westcliffe Publishing, 2003. (ISBN 978-1-565-79480-1)
- Text by Sandra Friend

The Appalachian Trail: Calling me Back to the Hills

- Westcliffe Publishing, 2002. (ISBN 978-1-565-79382-8)
- Text by Earl Shaeffer

Along the Pacific Crest Trail

- Westcliffe Publishing, 1998. (ISBN 978-1-56579-277-7)
- Text by Karen Berger and Daniel R. Smith
