= Chester Dziengielewski =

American hiker (died 2002)

Chester Dziengielewski (July 10, 1923 – August 7, 2002), was a machinist from Naugatuck, Connecticut, was the first person to successfully thru-hike the Appalachian Trail from Maine to Georgia in 1951. Dziengielewski had attempted a southbound thru-hike the previous year, but gave up the attempt at the Delaware Water Gap. He completed his hike on October 10, 1951, thereby becoming the third person to thru-hike the Trail in any direction, after Earl Shaffer (1948) and Gene Espy (1951), who both hiked from Georgia to Maine.

During his hike, Dziengielewski met Espy, who was traveling north that same year, at the Smith Gap Shelter in Pennsylvania, where they had dinner together and discussed their experiences on the Trail. Dziengielewski hiked the final two weeks of his trek with Bill Hall, who was also hiking southbound that year, but who had skipped forward 300 miles in order to catch up with Dziengielewski. When he reached the then southern terminus of the Trail at Mount Oglethorpe, Dziengielewski wrote in the register, "Success. Thank God. It's a long trail."

Dziengielewski died in 2002, at the age of 79.
