= Gene Espy =

American hiker (1927–2025)

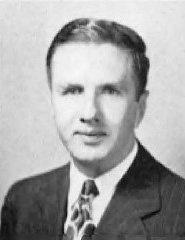
- A 1950 yearbook photo of Gene Espy
- Born: Eugene Marion Espy; April 14, 1927; Cordele, Georgia, U.S.
- Died: August 22, 2025 (aged 98); Atlanta, Georgia, U.S.
- Education: Georgia Institute of Technology
- Occupation: Engineer
- Known for: Second person to thru-hike the Appalachian Trail
- Spouse: Eugenia Bass (m. 1954)
- Children: 2

Eugene Marion Espy (April 14, 1927 – August 22, 2025) was an American hiker who is recognized as the second person to thru-hike the Appalachian Trail, making the entire 2,025-mile journey alone in one outing, covering 14 states in just over 123 days.

== Biography ==
Born and raised in Cordele, Georgia, Espy first heard about the Appalachian Trail from his seventh-grade teacher. Several years later, Espy and a friend hiked a section of the trail in the Great Smoky Mountains, but it was not until shortly after his graduation from the Georgia Institute of Technology that Espy decided to hike the entire Appalachian Trail.

=== Early life, education, and military service ===
He was born to parents who were a cotton buyer, his father Alto, and a music professor, his mother Iona (née Peterman), at Brenau University who taught organ and piano.

Espy was a boy scout as a youth and the first Eagle Scout from Cordele. He attended the Georgia Institute of Technology, interrupting his studies to enlist in the Navy during World War II, and graduating in 1950 with a bachelor's degree in industrial management and engineering.

=== Thru-hike ===
On May 31, 1951, Espy and a hometown friend set out from Mount Oglethorpe, Georgia, but after the first day Espy's friend dropped out, leaving Espy to hike the remainder of the trail alone. He would frequently go an entire week without seeing another person as the trail was relatively new, having been completed only a few years earlier. Espy traveled light, mailing replacement boots and other supplies to post office boxes at towns along the way and living off a diet of sandwiches, dehydrated potatoes, pudding and cornmeal, none of which required cooking. Espy arrived at the top of Mt. Katahdin, Maine, on September 30, 1951.

Espy's 1951 hike received some coverage in local newspapers. He did not realize the significance of his accomplishment until someone showed him a newspaper clipping describing him as the second thru-hiker.

During his hike, Espy chanced to meet Chester Dziengielewski, who was thru hiking southbound, at the Smith Gap Shelter in Pennsylvania on August 6, the first ever meeting of a northbound and a southbound thru hiker on the Appalachian Trail. Dziengielewski completed his hike 10 days after Espy.

The Appalachian Trail Museum honored Espy by including him in the first group of individuals inducted to the Appalachian Trail Hall of Fame. At the time of the inaugural ceremony, June 17, 2011, Espy was the only one of the six honorees still living.

== Personal life ==
Espy married Eugenia Bass in 1954. They had two daughters.

Espy died on August 22, 2025, in Atlanta, at the age of 98.

== Works ==
- The Trail Of My Life: The Gene Espy Story (2008) ISBN 1934144517
