= Great Western Loop =

Long-distance hiking trail in the United States

Coordinates: 40°24′N 106°37′W

Great Western Trail
- Length: 6,875 miles (11,064 km)
- Location: California, Oregon, Washington, Canada, Idaho, Montana, Wyoming, Colorado, New Mexico, Arizona
- Use: Hiking

The Great Western Loop is a hiking route that is 6,875 miles (11,064 km) long, and passes through several states of the Western United States.

== Route ==
It links together five long-distance hiking trails: the Pacific Crest Trail, the Pacific Northwest Trail, the Continental Divide Trail, the Grand Enchantment Trail, and the Arizona Trail. It traverses the Mojave Desert, the Sonoran Desert, 12 National Parks, and 75 wilderness areas.

It passes through nine states: Arizona, California, Oregon, Washington, Idaho, Montana, Wyoming, Colorado, and New Mexico.

== Successful hikes ==
The trail is only known to have been completed a few times:

- Andrew Skurka, a professional backpacker, was the first to complete the Great Western Loop. On April 9, 2007, Skurka began the route from the Grand Canyon. Averaging 33 miles (53 km) per day, Skurka arrived back at the Grand Canyon on November 3, 2007, 208 days after he began.
- Jeff Garmire became the second person to complete the route, doing so in 2018. Jeff Garmire started on April 30 and finished on November 24, totaling 208 days on the trail.
- In 2021, Niels Rabe completed a slightly different version of the Great Western Loop due to extensive wildfires in Washington and California. He became the first person to complete the route counter-clockwise after 222 days on trail.
- Also in 2021, Logan Demas (“Sandman”) completed the ‘Greatest Western Loop’ by hiking the original loop and adding sections to complete both the PCT and CDT. At almost 40 years old, he is also the oldest person to complete the Loop.
- A third hiker in 2021, Garry ("Phish Out of Water") Teesdale, completed a contiguous clockwise route of ~6200 miles that returned to the Grand Canyon from the CDT via the Hayduke Trail/AZT rather than the GET/AZT route originally followed by Skurka and Garmire.
- In 2022, Nick ("Chezwick") Gagnon established a new fastest known time and completed the trail in 197 days and 11 hours, beating Jeff Garmire's 2018 time and Andrew Skurka's 2007 time (both completed the route in 208 days).
