= Earl Shaffer =

American outdoorsman (1918–2002)

- Born: November 8, 1918; York, Pennsylvania, U.S.
- Died: May 5, 2002 (aged 83); Lebanon, Pennsylvania, U.S.
- Occupations: Hiker; soldier; carpenter

Earl Victor Shaffer (November 8, 1918 – May 5, 2002) was an American outdoorsman and author known from 1948 as The Crazy One (and eventually as The Original Crazy One) for attempting what became the first publicized claimed hiking trip in a single season over the entire length of the Appalachian Trail (AT). He also worked as a carpenter, a soldier specializing in radar and radio installation, and an antique dealer.

== Biography ==
Shaffer was born in rural York, Pennsylvania, which lies approximately twenty miles from the AT, and which he always made his home. In the late 1930s he hiked with a neighbor and close friend, Walter Winemiller, and they made plans to hike the whole of the AT together, after the war that they anticipated the US would eventually enter.

Shaffer enlisted in the army in 1941, was well along in his training at the time of the Pearl Harbor attack, and did arduous and risky service as a forward-area radioman in the South Pacific into 1945. His friend Winemiller served in the Pacific Theater as well, and died in the Iwo Jima landings. Shaffer said he did the trail to "walk the war out of my system".

In 1948, he began the journey from Mt. Oglethorpe, in Georgia (the trail's southern end at that time). With sparse equipment that would be regarded as grossly inadequate by most of the through-hikers since – he used worn boots, his army rucksack, and no stove or tent – he reached Mt. Katahdin in Maine, in 124 days, averaging 17 miles per day. Especially after he overcame the skepticism of Appalachian Trail Conference officials (who initially believed his claim of completing the route was obviously fraudulent), his trip raised public awareness of the Trail. He privately published his memoir of the experience; his book, Walking With Spring (ISBN 0-917953-84-3), reflects the experience of most AT hikers, that the project of making the whole trip in the northward direction (the most common choice), is furthered by a start timed to the weather in the Georgia mountains, and by continually taking advantage of the northward progress of milder weather.

In 1965 Shaffer hiked in 99 days from Maine to Springer Mountain, which had recently replaced Oglethorpe as the Trail's Georgia end, becoming the first person to claim a complete trip in each direction.

In 1982, the Appalachian Trail Conference published Shaffer's Walking With Spring commercially; it is now called "a classic trail diary".

In 1998, he claimed another northward through-hike (at age 79) from May 2 to October 21 (six days past official closing of the state park), in 173 days, for the 50th anniversary of his first one, with David Donaldson (known as "The Spirit of '48"). He later developed his notes from this trip, under the working title "Ode to the Appalachian Trail", into The Appalachian Trail: Calling Me Back To The Hills.

Shaffer was diagnosed with liver cancer, and died of its complications soon after on May 5, 2002, in Lebanon, Pennsylvania. Donaldson, his most recent through-hike companion, was at his bedside.

On 17 June 2011, he was inducted into the Appalachian Trail Hall of Fame at the Appalachian Trail Museum as a charter member.

== Long distance hiking ==
Earl Shaffer is best known as the first person to hike the entire length of the Appalachian Trail in one, continuous journey. Such hikes have come to be known as “thru-hikes” from the words, “hiking through.”

The original concept of a thru-hike was a continuous journey from one end of a long trail to the other. In the 21st century, however, the requirements with respect to the Appalachian Trail have been relaxed to recognize a hike of the entire Appalachian Trail completed within a single period of 12 months. This was not the case at the time of Earl’s A.T. thru hikes.

=== 1948: first thru-hike of the Appalachian Trail ===
Prior to 1948, only 7 people had hiked the entire length of the Appalachian Trail—more than 2,000 miles. They had done so by means of “section hiking”, consisting of shorter journeys of a month or a few weeks completed over the course of several years. Completing a hike of the entire trail in one journey was not considered feasible. Earl, however, believed it was possible, and set out do so on April 4, 1948.

Earl carefully documented his northbound hike through photography, entries into notebooks kept at trail shelters where he spent the night and, most importantly, detailed entries into the trail journal he called his “Little Black Book.”

The first indication that Earl was well on his way to completing his hike took the form of a postcard sent to the Appalachian Trail Conference (ATC) from Holmes, New York. On the postcard, Earl had sketched a view of the Pinnacles of Dan in Virginia (no longer on the AT) along with the following poem as his message:

The flowers bloom, the songbirds sing,

And though it sun or rain,

I walk the mountain tops with spring

From Georgia north to Maine.

Earl’s claim to have hiked the entire Appalachian Trail received careful scrutiny, particularly by the Appalachian Trail Conservancy (ATC) whose members had the most intimate knowledge of the Trail. After careful consideration of Earl’s documentation and other evidence, he was officially recognized by the ATC as the first person to hike the entire length of the Appalachian Trail without interruption.

Nevertheless, as Philip D'Anieri has written, subsequent research based on Shaffer's trail diary and other sources suggests that Shaffer "may have missed 20 percent or more of the southern AT in his travels, including two car trips that skipped over almost 25 miles of trail."

=== 1965: first person to thru-hike the Appalachian Trail in both directions ===
After many years of volunteer work related to the Appalachian Trail, Earl undertook a second thru-hike in 1965, starting from Mount Katahdin in Maine and finishing at Springer Mountain, which had recently been designated the Trail's southern terminus, replacing Mount Oglethorpe. On completing this hike, Earl Shaffer became the first person known to have completed thru-hikes of the Appalachian Trail in both directions: northbound, from Georgia to Maine, and southbound, from Maine to Georgia.

=== 1998: oldest person to thru-hike the Appalachian Trail ===
Fifty years after the completion of his historic 1948 hike, the mountains called Earl back for a final, northbound thru-hike that established him as the oldest person at the time to have completed a thru-hike of the Appalachian Trail. When Earl completed this “50 Anniversary” hike, he was 79 years old and just two weeks short of his 80th birthday.

Earl’s account of his 1948 hike, Walking with Spring, is published by the Appalachian Trail Conservancy. His final hike is recorded in two books published by the Earl Shaffer Foundation. Appalachian Trail: Calling Me Back to the Hills is a large format, “coffee table size” book that is richly illustrated with photographs of the Appalachian Trail taken by Bart Smith. Ode to the Appalachian Trail is a smaller, more personal account of Earl’s final hike written in a poetic, “ode” format. It is a limited, numbered printing for which copies are still available.

== Earl Shaffer's writing ==
During his groundbreaking first thru-hike of the Appalachian Trail in 1948, Earl Shaffer documented his adventures in vivid detail. Along with his photographs, Earl's trail diary was used to confirm that he was the first-ever person to complete the more than 2,000-mile long trail in one continuous journey. Filled with stories of interactions with locals and other hikers, stories of adventure, poetry, and reflections on the stillness he found in nature, this compilation was later published as his best-known book, Walking with Spring.

The original "Little Black Book" is part of the Smithsonian Institution's permanent collection at the National Museum of American History in Washington, D.C. along with many of Earl's belongings. Earl's 1948 trail journal has been both scanned and transcribed by volunteers and is available to read in its entirety as an online exhibit here.

== Earl Shaffer's poetry ==
Before Earl "walked with spring" he documented his entire Army experiences in a poetic journal. A portion of the journal was written in a fast moving "marching" rhythm with ballad quatrains and end rhyme. It is titled "The Doughboy Odyssey." In other sections of his journal, he experimented with different poetic forms such as the difficult English and Heroic sonnet forms as well as free verse and the ballad. He had with him a Bible, rhyming dictionary, and a book of Rudyard Kipling poetry. Through his poetic journal, he not only documented his South Pacific odyssey from island to island as a Signal Corps man, but also specific battles, war machinery, war time news, and island cultures. These poems have been compiled into two volumes. Before I Walked With Spring includes "The Doughboy Odyssey" which is a ballad review of his entire military career. South of the Sunset specifically describes the war in the Pacific Theater with eyewitness accounts of battles and cultures.

== Appalachian Trail volunteer ==
As teens Earl, along with his neighbor Walter Winemiller and younger brother Evan Shaffer, frequently walked the section of the Appalachian Trail from Caledonia off Route 30 to Dillsburg, PA. Before Walter entered the US Marines and Earl the US Army, they made a pact to walk the entire Appalachian Trail when they returned home. Pearl Harbor and World War II intervened and only one of the two returned home.

The decision to attempt hiking the entire length of the Appalachian Trail in 1948 was not only the challenge of doing something never done before, but also to honor his friend Walter and "walk off the war" as he described his own war trauma. Every year thousands of recent war veterans begin their trek on the Appalachian Trail for the same reason. Publicity following Earl Shaffer’s 1948 thru-hike increased public awareness of the Appalachian Trail and brought to it many new hikers.

Following his thru-hike, Earl became active in the work the Appalachian Trail Conference (ATC), which he had joined prior to his hike. Earl’s contributions as an Appalachian Trail volunteer are recorded in his authorized biography by Donaldson and Forrester, A Grip on the Mane of Life.

== Musician ==
While he concentrated much of his time on writing poetry, Earl Shaffer enjoyed setting many of his poems to song. In his later years, Earl recorded many of these songs while playing his acoustic guitar, steel string guitar and mandolin. Many of his songs are dedicated to his experience and love of the Appalachian Trail, and to his experience as a soldier during WWII.

His music is compiled into albums that include Always in April and Trail of the Tropic Moon.

Always in April is an album of songs primarily focused on Earl's experience on the Appalachian Trail. Trail of the Tropic Moon contains music written by Earl while he was stationed in the South Pacific during World War II and after he returned home to Pennsylvania.

Earl's music can be downloaded digitally on the Earl Shaffer Foundation website.
