= Backpacking Light Magazine =

Ultralight backpacking magazine

Backpacking Light
- Publisher: Ryan Jordan
- Founded: 2000
- Company: Beartooth Media Group, Inc.
- Country: United States
- Based in: Estes Park, Colorado
- Language: English
- Website: www.backpackinglight.com
- ISSN: 1550-4417

Backpacking Light is an online hiking magazine, guided trekking outfitter, and outdoor skills education provider founded in 2000 by Ryan Jordan, a backcountry adventurer, engineer, and outdoor educator. The print version was discontinued in October 2008. The Sierra Club has named it a major player in the ultralight backpacking subculture. Articles are written by scientists, engineers, and experienced hikers. Backpacking Light has developed outdoor leadership training programs and workshops for a variety of groups and organizations including the Boy Scouts of America, search and rescue teams, and the National Outdoor Leadership School.
