= Pacific Crest Trail Association =

Non-profit organization in the US

- Abbreviation: PCTA
- Formation: 1992 (as Pacific Crest Trail Association); 1971 (as Pacific Crest Trail Club)
- Type: Nonprofit organization
- Purpose: Conservation and management of the Pacific Crest Trail
- Headquarters: Sacramento, California, United States
- Region served: California; Oregon; Washington
- Methods: Trail maintenance; volunteer coordination; education; advocacy; land acquisition
- Key people: Liz Bergeron (former Executive Director)
- Affiliations: United States Forest Service; National Park Service; Bureau of Land Management; California Department of Parks and Recreation

The Pacific Crest Trail Association (PCTA) is a nonprofit organization dedicated to the conservation and management of the Pacific Crest National Scenic Trail (usually abbreviated as the PCT), a 2,650-mile hiking and equestrian trail in the western United States that runs through California, Oregon, and Washington. The southern terminus is in Campo, California at the Mexican border approximately 50 miles east of San Diego. The northern terminus is at the US–Canadian border at E.C. Manning Provincial Park, which lies just north of the border between Washington and British Columbia.

== History ==
The PCT was established as a national scenic trail by the National Trails Systems Act of 1968. In 1971, the Pacific Crest Trail Club was founded, and in 1977 the Pacific Crest Trail Conference was incorporated. The two groups merged in 1987, and in 1992, the name was changed to the Pacific Crest Trail Association. The Association hired its first paid staff in 1993.

The PCTA works under a Memorandum of Understanding with the U.S.D.A Forest Service (the lead agency responsible for governmental oversight of the trail), and other federal agencies.

The PCTA is headquartered in Sacramento, California.

== Mission and partnerships ==
The PCTA's mission is to protect, preserve and promote the Pacific Crest National Scenic Trail as a world-class experience for hikers and equestrians, and for all the values provided by wild and scenic lands.

The USDA Forest Service, the governmental agency charged with overseeing federal oversight of the trail, elaborates that the PCTA fulfills this mission by 1) promoting the use and protection of the Pacific Crest Trail to reflect its world-class significance for the enjoyment, education and adventure of hikers and equestrians 2) publishing information on the PCT including books, guidebooks, maps, condition reports, videos, and permits 3) sponsoring a wide variety of public service volunteer projects and programs in cooperation with agency partners such as the USDA-Forest Service, the National Park Service, the Bureau of Land Management, California State Parks, and others.

In 2021, along with the USDA Forest Service and the National Park Service, the PCTA collaborated on a Foundation Document to identify the significance of and fundamental resources for the entire 2,650 miles of the Pacific Crest Trail (PCT). The project considers the perspectives of stakeholders and organizations including the U.S.D.A. Forest Service, the National Park Service, the Bureau of Land Management, California State Parks, the PTCA, Backcountry Horseman of America, 60 Indian tribes whose current and ancestral lands are along the trail, hiking clubs, volunteers, thru-hikers, trail towns, and others.

== Education and trail support activities ==
The PCTA serves as a clearinghouse for information about trail conditions, threats to the trails, and issues that affect hikers and equestrians. In 2019, the Trust for Public Land announced that in partnership with the PCTA, it had protected 17 miles of trail in northern California, and identified climate change and fires, timber cutting, increased usage, threats to wildlife from human interaction, and maintaining funding from the federally administered Land and Water Conservation Fund as key management priorities.

Through media campaigns and its own outreach, the PCTA educates hikers about issues that affect the trail. These issues can include temporary closures, or can be more global. For example, the PCT makes hikers aware of how climate change is affecting large-scale western forest fires, which can destroy hundreds of miles of trail and create life-threatening conditions that force hikers to abandon their itineraries.

Additionally, the PCTA website contains comprehensive information about trail closures, conditions, relocations, events, books, maps, and upcoming trail events that educate hikers in safe backcountry travel and Leave No Trace principles. In 2017, in cooperation with some of its donors, it operated a program it called P3 (Preserve, Protect, and Promote—taken from its mission statement), which highlighted ten Pacific Crest Trail thru-hikers who would help promote and advocate for the PCT via blogs and social media during their thru-hikes.

== Trail maintenance and continuity ==
The Pacific Crest Trail Association takes a lead role in maintaining the trail and keeping it open and passable as a continuous foot and bridle path from Mexico to Canada. Maintaining the trail requires clearing undergrowth and fallen trees, repairing damage from storms and flooding, building new trail that needs to be relocated because of damage, treadway improvement, or land ownership issues; and maintaining trail signage. Speaking as the executive director of the PCTA in 2016, Liz Bergeron, told ESPN that PCTA volunteers logged 96,500 hours in the previous year, the majority of which were spent on trail maintenance. She estimated that PCTA volunteers probably covered about 50 percent of what is needed every year, or about 1300 miles of the trail's nearly 2700 mile length. The PCTA additionally runs a trail skills course that educates volunteers about trail maintenance, tools, and safety.

The PCTA has also had a role in protecting the integrity of the trail as a continuous footpath, for example, negotiating easements and trail routings with private landowners. While a Golden Spike ceremony in 1993 celebrated the completion of the PCTA, it was later learned that a missing easement in the Stevens Pass (Washington) area threatened the continuity of the trail. A private landowner had been considering fencing off a segment of trail and cutting off public access. In 2017 the Pacific Crest Trail Association bought more than 400 acres for $1.6 million to keep the trail open to the public.

== The Wild phenomenon ==
Cheryl Strayed’s book, Wild, was published in 2012 and became a best-seller; the effect on the trail was initially modest with a small increase in inquiries to the PCTA. But in 2014, a movie based on the book came out, and had a much larger effect. According to a 2015 Associated Press article (which was published in newspapers throughout the United States, e.g.: the New York Daily News, the Santa Fe New Mexican, and The Florida Times-Union), the PCTA saw a dramatic increase in the number of hikers attempting to hike the entire trail. Liz Bergeron, executive director of the Pacific Crest Trail Association, told Conde Nast Traveler that the PCTA saw increased numbers everywhere within a year of the movie's release—more day hikers, doubled website traffic, and more permit requests for thru-hiking; she said that nearly 2,000 people attempted a thru-hike in 2014, double the previous year. In response, the PCTA launched a campaign, with Strayed's support, using the hashtag #responsiblywild to promote safety and Leave No Trace practices.

They also implemented a new permit system to limit the number of long-distance backpackers in order to spread out the usage. Speaking to Seattle Backpackers Magazine, Bob Woods, the North Cascades Regional Director for the Pacific Crest Trail Association, explained that the new permit regulations were necessary because it was anticipated that the increased awareness of the trail would result in record breaking use in the next few years.

The PCTA also published information about the benefits of southbound itineraries, which could help to lessen the impact by spreading out hikers.

== COVID-19 and the PCT ==
Immediately subsequent to the increase of traffic on the trail after the Wild phenomenon, the PCTA took a leading role in determining how trail policies would respond to the COVID-19 pandemic. Outdoor spaces nationwide saw a large uptick of visitor use by people looking for safe spaces in which to recreate. But in April 2020, the PCTA asked long-distance hikers to postpone their 2020 thru-hikers, or, if they had already started, to leave the trail.

The PCTA was concerned about the potential for the virus to spread among hikers, because the trail is, in part, a social experience, and hikers often congregate close together. Long-distance hikers were also viewed as potential disease vectors who could spread the virus to rural communities with limited medical facilities that were already strained. Additionally, the PCTA was concerned about the inherent dangers of PCT hiking; the trail crosses high mountains and harsh environments, and at least 15 people have died on the trail, nine of them from either falls or heatstroke. The PCTA judged that it was more responsible to avoid the kinds of accidents that could require emergency services to operate in the wilderness environment, which could expose both victims and rescuers to the virus from necessary contact with each other, and which would take health workers away from much needed jobs on the front lines of the pandemic. While the PCTA has no legal authority to close the trail, it does have the authority to grant permits for long-distance trips. In August 2020, the PCTA again delayed the opening of the permit cycle for 2021.
