= Lowell Thomas Travel Journalism Awards =

Annual literary awards

- Awarded for: Excellence in travel journalism, including editing (newspaper, magazine, website travel coverage); writing (magazines, online, newspapers, books); and multi-media (broadcasting, special packages podcasts, video, photography, radio).
- Date: Annual
- Presented by: Society of American Travel Writers Foundation
- Website: http://www.satwf.org

The Lowell Thomas Travel Journalism Awards are administered by the U.S.-based Society of American Travel Writers Foundation (SATW Foundation), a nonprofit organization founded in the early 1980s to recognize excellence in travel journalism. The first awards were given in 1985 for work done in 1984. The competition is named after Lowell Thomas, the celebrated 20th century travel journalist and broadcaster. It is open to journalists from around the world and is considered one of the premier professional awards programs for travel journalists and communicators. Entrants (in the early 2020s, more than 1200 annually) include major media outlets, staff writers and editors, freelancers, book authors, digital communicators, and journalism fellows from such institutions as the Pulitzer Center. The competition honors works in more than two dozen categories, including print, digital, audio, video and photography. Winners are announced at the SATW (Society of America Travel Writers) annual convention and receive cash prizes.

The competition attracts entries from, and is covered by, major media, including the New York Times, Chicago Tribune, Los Angeles Times, Orange County Register, Washington Post,Cleveland Plain Dealer, Oregonian, Outside magazine, and Globe and Mail.

== Categories ==
The Grand Award (Travel Journalist of the Year) is given to an editor or writer whose work excels in at least five of the awards categories. In 1985 (the first year awards were given), there were 15 categories. In the intervening years, new categories, including blogging, websites, video, and multi-media, were added to reflect the changing journalism landscape. For the awards announced in 2021, a new category travel for health and safety was added, and the list had expanded to 27 categories: Grand Award, Travel Health/Safety Coverage, Newspaper Travel Coverage, Travel Magazines, Travel Coverage in General Magazines, U.S./Canada Travel, Foreign Travel, Photo Illustration of Travel, Special Packages/Series, Cruise Travel, Adventure Travel, Travel News/Investigative Reporting, Service-Oriented Consumer Work, Environmental and Sustainable Tourism, Cultural Tourism, Personal Comment, Special-Purpose Travel, Short Work on Travel, Culinary-Related Travel, Travel Book, Guidebook, Travel Journalism Websites, Travel Audio, Travel Audio (Podcasts and Guides), Travel Video, Travel Blogs, Multimedia Single Work.

== Judging ==
Entries are judged by members of the journalism faculty of an accredited U.S. university, each of which takes on the project for five or six years. Previous judges have included members of the faculties of the University of Missouri School of Journalism, the University of North Carolina-Chapel Hill School of Journalism and Mass Communication, the Northwestern University Medill School of Journalism, and the University of Florida College of Journalism and Communications. In 2015, judging returned to the University of Missouri, which had judged the competition for two previous terms.

== Grand Award winners ==
Grand Award winners
Year	Journalist	Outlet
2025	Natalie Compton	The Washington Post
2024	Natalie Compton	
2023	Stephanie Pearson	Freelance
2022	Stephen Hiltner	The New York Times
2021	Katherine LaGrave	Afar
2020	Kevin West	Freelance
2019	Elaine Glusac	Freelance
2018	Christopher Solomon	Freelance
2017	Christopher Reynolds	The Los Angeles Times
2016	Aaron Teasdale	Freelance
2015	Todd Pitock	Freelance
2014	Jill Schensul	The Record (New Jersey)
2013	Mary Jo McConahay	Freelance
2012	Jill Schensul	The Record (North Jersey)
2011	Rick Steves	Rick Steves Europe
2010	Andrew McCarthy	Freelance
2009	Joe Ray	Freelance
2008	Christopher P. Baker	Freelance
2007	Tom Haines	The Boston Globe
2006	Jane Wooldridge	The Miami Herald
2005	Tom Haines	The Boston Globe
2004	Rosemary McClure	The Los Angeles Times
2003	Tom Haines	The Boston Globe
2002	Wayne Curtis	Freelance
2001	Harry Shattuck	The Houston Chronicle
2000	Peter Guttman	Freelance
1999	Jill Schensul	The Record (North Jersey)
1998	Alan Solomon	The Chicago Tribune
1997	Christopher Reynolds	The Los Angeles Times
1996	William Ecenbarger	Freelance
1995	Christopher Reynolds	The Los Angeles Times
1994	Jack Schnedler	The Chicago Sun-Times
1993	Jim Molnar	The Seattle Times
1992	Jim Molnar	The Seattle Times
1991	Jim Molnar	The Seattle Times
1990	Catherine Watson	The Star Tribune (Minneapolis)
1989	Laura Bly	The Orange County Register
1988	Bob O’Sullivan	Freelance
1987	Carol Barrington	Freelance

== Multiple Lowell Thomas Award Winners ==
The SATW Foundation maintains a list of all winners by year; the following publications and individuals have garnered the most awards as of 2021:

=== Publications ===
National Geographic Traveler: 122

Seattle Times: 86

Minneapolis Star Tribune: 62

Chicago Tribune: 59

Islands magazine: 59

Los Angeles Times: 52

Outside magazine: 47

San Francisco Chronicle: 40 (20 as Examiner-Chronicle)

Boston Globe: 39

Record (NJ): 39

Travel + Leisure: 38

National Geographic Adventure: 37

Oregonian: 36

Frommer's: 36 (varying media)

Washington Post: 35

Orange County Register: 35

USA Today :28

New York Times: 27

Miami Herald: 22

Dallas Morning News: 21

Lonely Planet: 19

Chicago Sun-Times: 18

Afar: 17 (since 2010)

New Orleans Times-Picayune: 16

Southern Living magazine: 16

=== Individuals ===
Catherine Watson: Minneapolis Star Tribune 29.

Jill Schensul: (The Record/North Jersey Media Group) 29

Alan Solomon: 25 (Chicago Tribune) 25

Chris Welsch: (Minneapolis Star Tribune) 19

Gary Stoller: (Conde Nast Traveler and USA Today) 12

Christopher Reynolds: (Los Angeles Times) 11

Don George: (various media) 10
