= Continental Divide Trail =

Long-distance scenic trail in the western United States

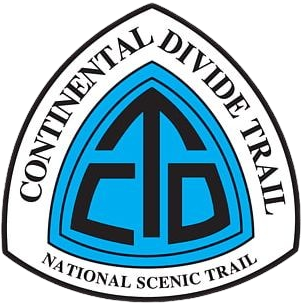
- Length: 3,028 mi (4,873 km)
- Location: United States
- Designation: National Scenic Trail in 1978
- Trailheads: Northern: Waterton Lakes National Park, Alberta, Glacier National Park, Montana, at the U.S.–Canada border Southern: Crazy Cook Monument, Big Hatchet Mountains, New Mexico, at the U.S.–Mexico border
- Use: Hiking some Horseback riding some Mountain biking
- Highest point: Grays Peak, Colorado, 14,278 ft (4,352 m)
- Lowest point: Lordsburg, New Mexico, and Waterton Lakes, Alberta, 4,200 ft (1,300 m)
- Months: April to October
- Sights: Continental Divide
- Hazards: Avalanches; Black bears Dehydration; Falling; Grizzly bears Hypothermia; Landslides; Lightning; Mountain lions Severe weather Snow

Trail map
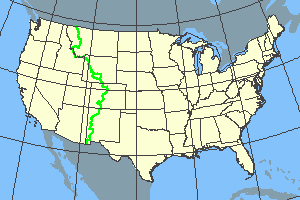

The Continental Divide National Scenic Trail (in short Continental Divide Trail, CDT) is a United States National Scenic Trail with a length measured by the Continental Divide Trail Coalition of 3,028 miles (4,873 km) between the U.S. border with Chihuahua, Mexico, and the border with Alberta, Canada. Frequent route changes and a large number of alternate routes result in an actual hiking distance of 2,700 miles (4,300 km) to 3,150 miles (5,070 km). The CDT follows the Continental Divide of the Americas along the Rocky Mountains and traverses five U.S. states — Montana, Idaho, Wyoming, Colorado, and New Mexico. In Montana near the Canadian border the trail crosses Triple Divide Pass (near Triple Divide Peak, from which waters may flow to either the Arctic Ocean (via Hudson Bay), Atlantic Ocean or Pacific Ocean).

In 2021, the CDT was about 70 percent complete, with a combination of dedicated trails and dirt and paved roads. Hikers can continue north into Alberta and British Columbia via the Great Divide Trail to Kakwa Lake in Kakwa Provincial Park and Protected Area, B.C., north of Jasper National Park.

The CDT was described in 2013 by a Triple Crown hiker as "Raw, wild, remote and unfinished; it is a trail that will make use of all the skills of an experienced backpacker. It is also a trail that is beautiful, stunning and perhaps the most rewarding of the major long-distance hiking trails." Distances given are approximate as sections of the trail are uncompleted and the trail is sometimes re-routed.

Two-time CDT thru-hiker and professional backpacker, Jeff Garmire, trail name Legend, described the trail by saying, "If you’re into suffering in solitude, the CDT is a perfect match."

== History ==
The establishment of the Appalachian Trail and the Pacific Crest Trail inspired proposals to create a Continental Divide Trail. The first section of the proposed trail was laid out in Colorado in 1962 by the Rocky Mountain Trails Association. In 1965, President Lyndon Johnson proposed a national system of trails and in 1968 the U.S. Congress adopted the National Trails System Act.

In 1978, the Continental Divide Trail was formally established with the responsibility for management given to the U.S. Forest Service. Portions of the trail already existed and a few hikers claimed to have walked from Mexico to Canada on the informal trail, among them Jim Wolf, a Baltimore lawyer who had hiked the Appalachian Trail in 1971, and whose account of that journey appears in the two-volume book, Hiking the Appalachian Trail. Wolf envisioned a similar trail running along the Continental Divide, and in 1978, he organized the Continental Divide Trail Society, which advocated for the newly designated National Scenic Trail and published several early guidebooks.

Progress in completing the trail was slow and interest in hiking the complete trail was minimal. By 1995, only 15 people were recorded as having hiked the whole trail, still largely unfinished. In that same year, the Continental Divide Trail Alliance (CDTA) was created and with volunteers built or improved the route of the trail. In 2012, the Continental Divide Trail Coalition replaced the CDTA to coordinate the efforts of several regional partners engaged in constructing and maintaining the trail. Thru-hikers increased from four in 1999 to more than 150 in 2019, and uncounted thousands hiked sections of the trail every year. Horseback riding is permitted on the trail; mountain biking is permitted on 65% of the trail.

Thru-hikers of the Continental Divide Trail, the Appalachian Trail (AT) and the Pacific Crest Trail (PCT) achieve what is known as the Triple Crown of Hiking. As of the end of the application period in late 2025, 837 hikers have been designated Triple Crowners since 1994 by the American Long Distance Hiking Association—West. More than 1,000 thru-hikers completed either the AT or PCT in 2019 compared to 150 completing the CDT, a reflection of the isolation and difficulty in hiking the CDT.

== Thru-hiking ==
Successfully thru-hiking the entire Continental Divide Trail takes an average of five months. The definition of a thru-hike is left to the judgment of the hikers. The purists hike a "continuous and unbroken footpath between Mexico and Canada," but about 50 percent of the thru-hikers admit to having skipped small sections of road-walking or because the trail was closed, mostly due to forest fires or snow. All hikers must replenish their food every few days, often hitchhiking from a road crossing of the trail into a town to buy food and supplies. Most hikers occasionally take a "zero", a day without hiking, or a "nearo" ( from "near zero"), a day with little hiking, to rest and recuperate. "Trail angels" (volunteers) at locations along the trail assist hikers with food, water, and transportation to and from resupply points to trail heads. A few hikers, especially those attempting to set speed records, are "supported," meaning they have helpers who meet or accompany them along the trail and perform non-hiking tasks, such as food preparation. Permits are required to hike or camp along some sections of the trail and a passport is needed to cross the Canadian border.

Most thru-hikers begin the hike in April in New Mexico, hike northbound, and finish at the Canadian border in August or September. If hikers begin too early they may encounter heavy and near impassable snow conditions in the southern San Juan and San Juan Mountains of Colorado, and if the hiker finishes too late they may encounter heavy and near impassable snow in Glacier National Park near the Canadian border. A few thru-hikers hike southbound (SOBO) from the Canadian border beginning in June and finishing in October or November. They may also encounter adverse weather conditions. A few hikers "flip-flop," hiking different sections of the trail when the weather is most favorable rather than sequentially. The most common problems reported by thru-hikers are injury and snow. The average base weight of a thru-hiker's backpack in 2018 was 16.4 lb (7.4 kg). Added to that, the thru-hiker carries up to a one-week supply of food weighing about 2 lb (0.91 kg) per day and, in drier areas especially New Mexico, up to five liters of water weighing 11 lb (5.0 kg). Extra equipment carried might include an ice ax and bear spray.

In 2019, the respondents to a survey of CDT thru-hikers were two-thirds male with a median age of 31. Three-quarters were from the United States and the remainder came from eleven other countries. The average number of days (including "zeros") to complete the hike was 147.

Although there are earlier claimants, Dave Odell is the first hiker officially credited with completing the still-undefined CDT in 1977. In 1978 three women hiked the entire trail: Nancy Andujar and the team of Jean Ella and Lynne Wisegart. In 2007, Francis Tapon became the first person to do a round backpacking trip "yo-yo" on the Continental Divide Trail when he through-hiked from Mexico to Canada and back to Mexico on the CDT. This seven-month journey spanned over 5,600 miles. Tapon took the most circuitous, scenic, high, difficult route north and while returning south, took the more expedient route. Andrew Skurka completed the trail as part of the 6,875-mile Great Western Loop in 2007. Olive "Raindance" McGloin yo-yoed in 2020 becoming the first woman on her second attempt (McGloin also yo-yoed the PCT in 2014).

The youngest person to thru-hike the trail is Reed Gjonnes, who hiked the trail with her father Eric Gjonnes from April 15, 2013 to September 6, 2013 in one continuous northbound hike at age 13.

== Route ==
The Continental Divide Trail closely follows the Continental Divide, but has a large number of approved alternate routes, some of which are more utilized than the official trail. The official trail is called the "Red Line." Alternates are called by other colors such as "Blue Line" or "Orange Line." The trail is incomplete in a few sections, especially in New Mexico, which requires walking on roads. Ninety-five percent of the trail is located on public land, including National Parks, National Forests, and land managed by the Bureau of Land Management. There are few facilities along the trail itself, and it is usually necessary for the hiker to leave the trail to resupply or find lodging.

Seventy percent (2,170 miles) of the trail is through land managed by the U.S. Forest Service. The Bureau of Land Management manages 12% or 372 miles of the trail, the National Park Service manages 10% or 310 miles, and state and private lands total 8% or 248 miles.

=== New Mexico ===
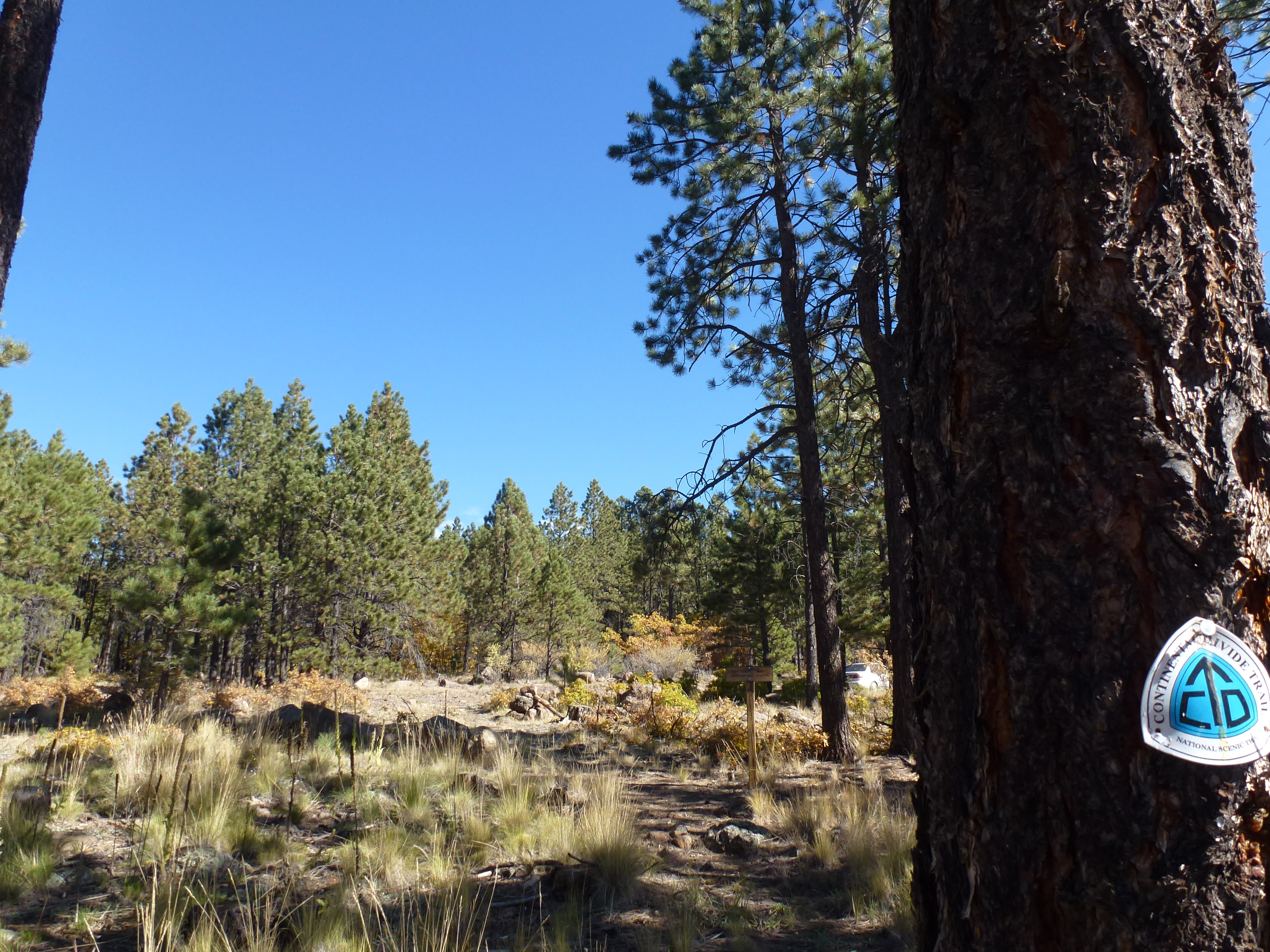
The official CDT trail marker on a pine tree in Cibola National Forest, New Mexico.

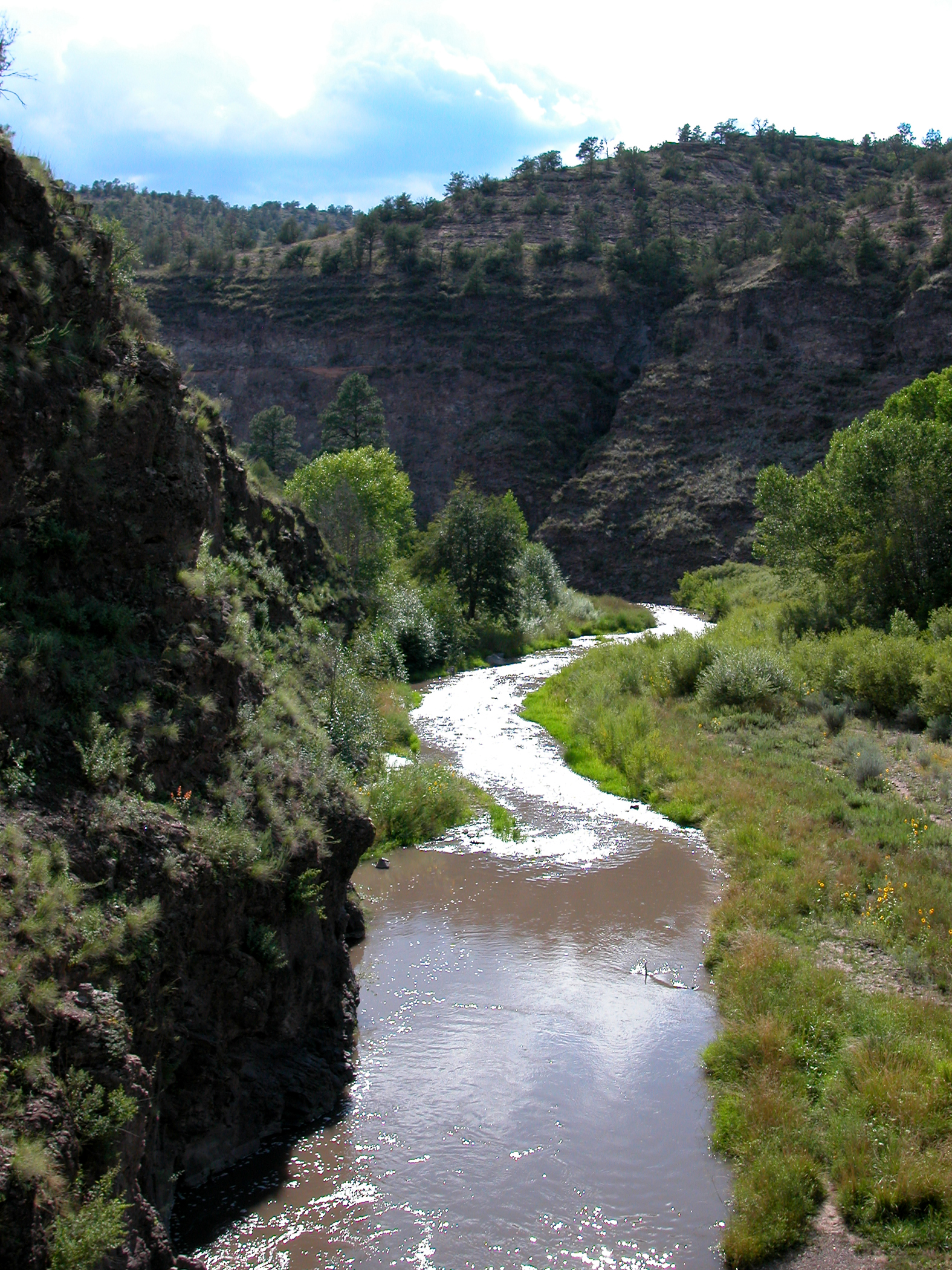
Most CDT hikers take an alternate route through the Gila Wilderness, New Mexico rather than following the official CDT.

Forest fires are a danger to hikers. Sections of the trail are often closed to hikers because of fire danger. In 2022, for example, more than 300 miles of the CDT were closed for one month due to drought conditions causing fire hazards.

The official route of the CDT in New Mexico is 794.5 miles (1,278.6 km) long, although many alternate routes shorten or lengthen that distance. The lowest elevation of the trail in New Mexico is 4,189 feet (1,277 m) in the town of Lordsburg and the highest elevation in New Mexico is 11,301 feet (3,445 m) at the summit of Mount Taylor. Much of the CDT route in New Mexico traverses desert and dry mountains. Finding drinking water is a challenge for hikers.

Three southern termini of the trail exist: 1) Crazy Cook Monument, the official CDT southern terminus, east of the Big Hatchet Mountains; 2) Antelope Wells, New Mexico; and 3) near Columbus, New Mexico. The Crazy Cook Monument in New Mexico's bootheel is the most commonly used starting or finishing point of the CDT, but due to its remote location lacks lodging and other services. As of October 7, 2025, the area near the Crazy Cook Monument has been declared a "National Defense Area" under the control of the U.S. Army. Crazy Crook is not accessible to hikers without a permit from the Army. A shuttle for hikers is permitted to approach to within 1.1 miles (2 km) of the Crazy Cook terminus. Only U.S. citizens will be granted permits to travel to the Crazy Cook terminus.

In northernmost New Mexico, the CDT crosses into Colorado near Cumbres Pass at an elevation of 10,022 feet (3,055 m). The trail is unfinished and many miles of the hike require road walking.

Notable points on the CDT in New Mexico from south to north include:

- Crazy Cook Monument. The CDT begins here at the border with Mexico at an elevation of 4,297 feet (1,310 m) and is accessed only by a dirt road.
- Animas and Playas Valleys. In the Chihuahua Desert water is scarce and the trail route is mostly informal.
- Big Burro Mountains. The first wooded areas on the CDT for the north-bound hiker.
- Silver City, New Mexico. The CDT passes through the town, a rest and resupply center.
- Gila Wilderness. Ninety-five percent of thru-hikers take the Gila River alternate trail which goes through the scenic canyon of the river. Voted third among favorite sections of the CDT by hikers in 2019.
- Pie Town. A hiker and biker-friendly hamlet on the trail with a hostel (the "Toaster House") supported by hiker's donations and a restaurant which serves pie.
- El Malpaís National Monument. Most hikers take a shorter alternate route by-passing many of the lava fields of El Malpais.
- Grants, New Mexico. A rest and resupply center. The CDT crosses Interstate 40 here.
- Mount Taylor. Most thru-hikers summit Mount Taylor, the highest point on the CDT in New Mexico.
- San Pedro Parks Wilderness. North bound hikers find here the first sizeable accumulations of snow on the trail until about 1 June at elevations of more than 10,000 feet (3,000 m).
- Ghost Ranch. A retreat and education center, the former home of artist Georgia O'Keeffe, and a popular site for filming Western movies.
- Chama, New Mexico. A resupply center and near the beginning of the long and difficult hike through the San Juan Mountains of southern Colorado.

=== Colorado ===
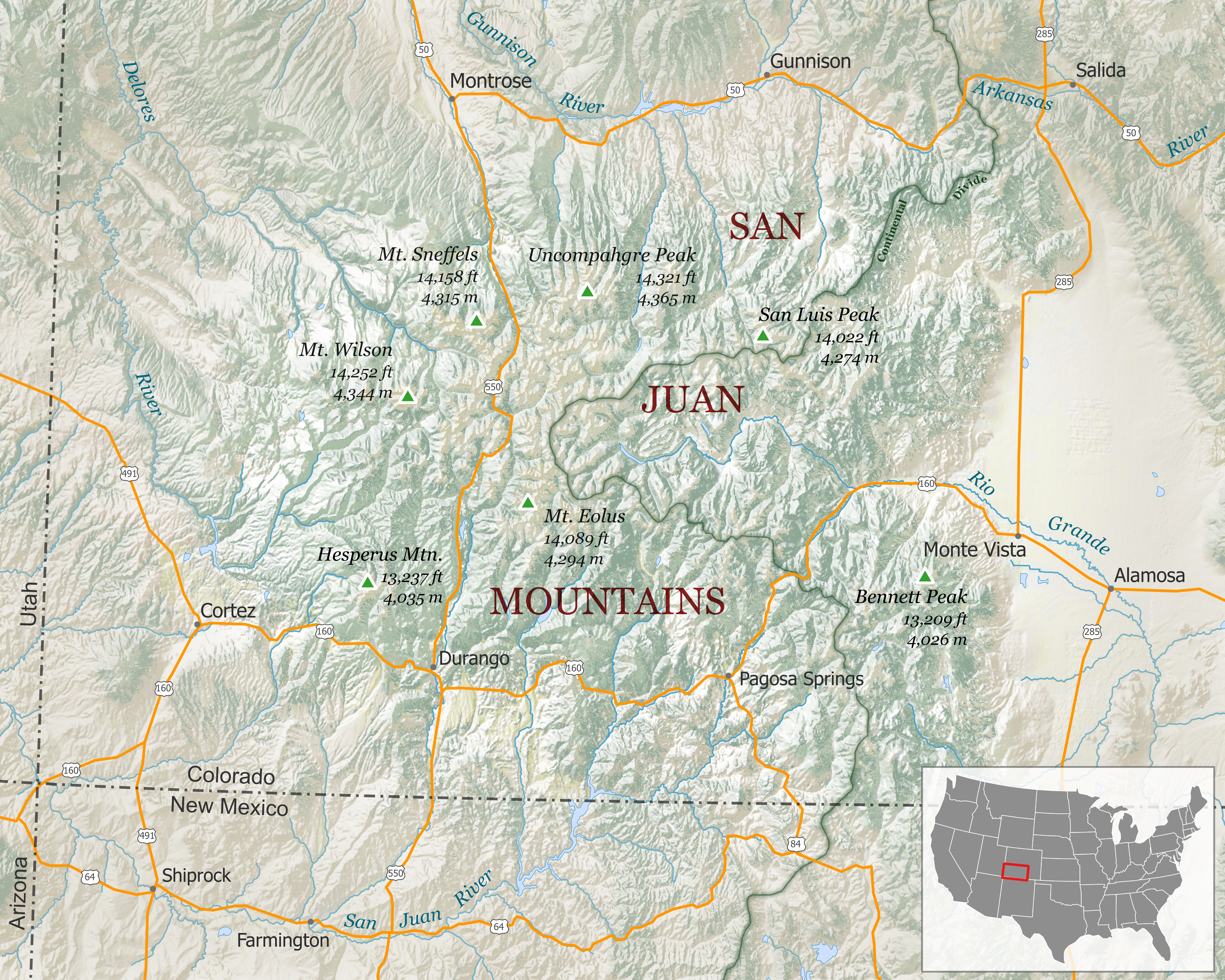
The San Juan Mountains and the Continental Divide Trail (green) in southern Colorado.

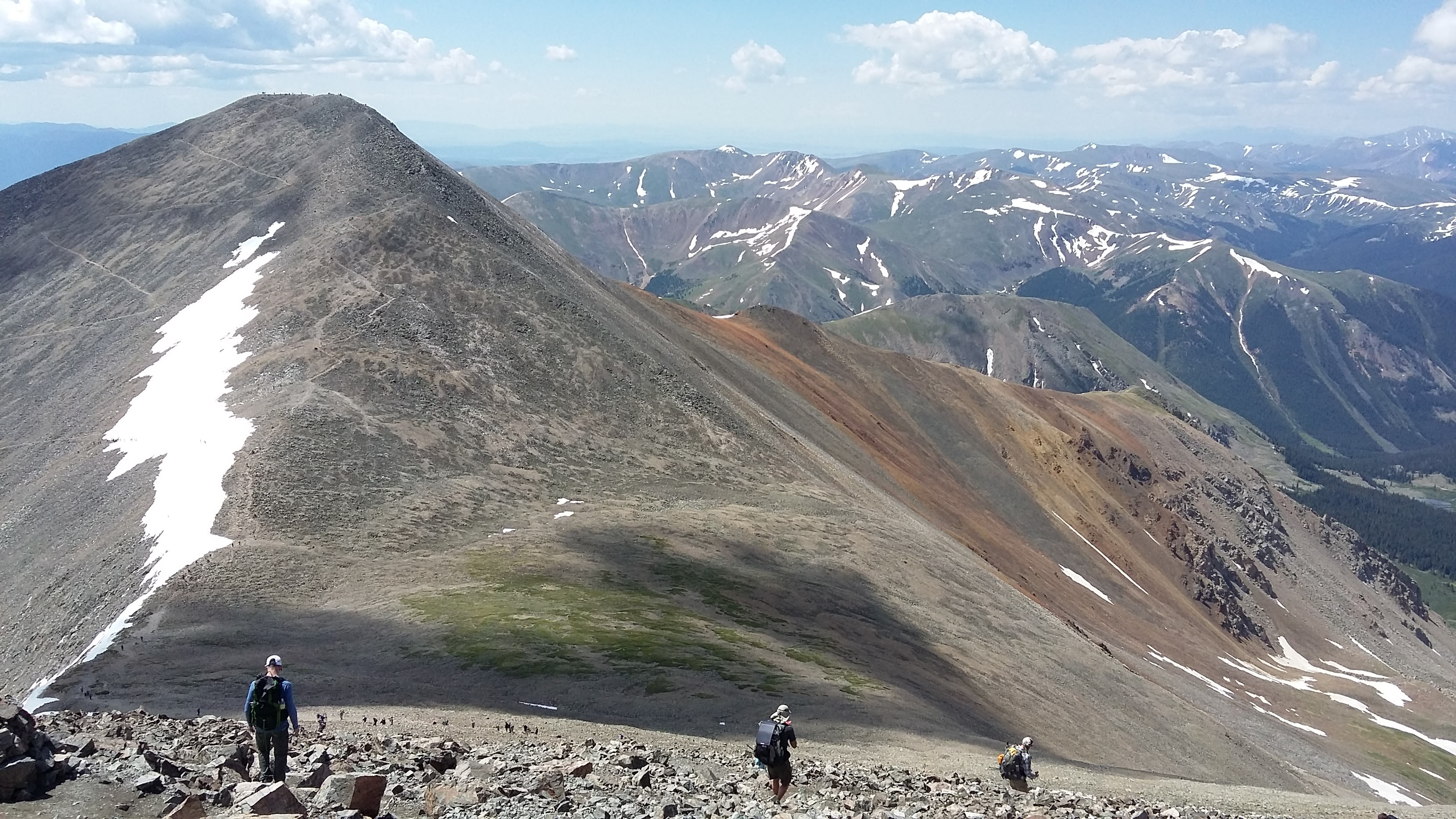
Grays Peak, Colorado is the highest point on the CDT (4 July 2016).

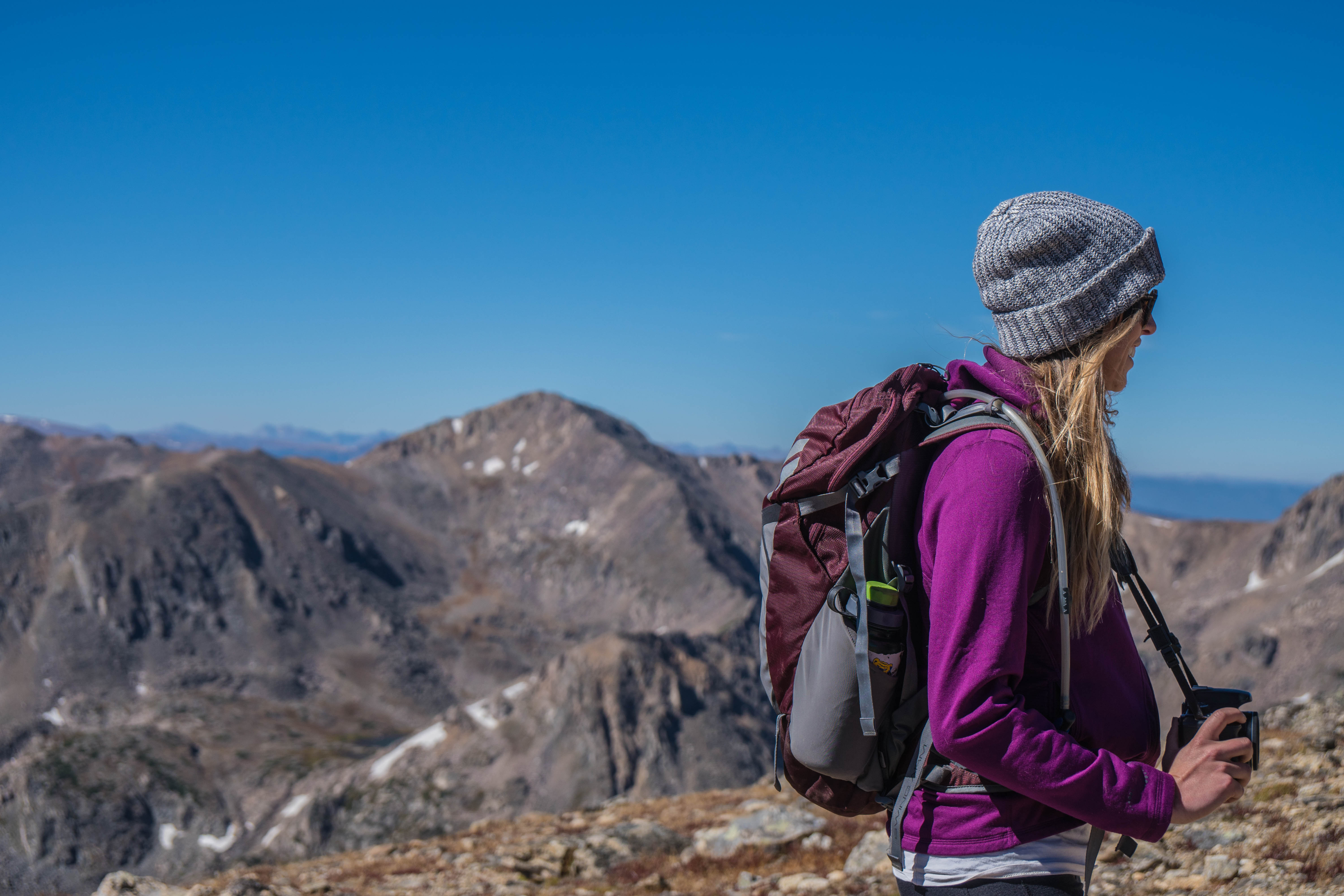
A hiker near James Peak, Colorado.

The official route of the CDT in Colorado is 735.5 miles (1,183.7 km) long, although several alternate routes shorten or lengthen that distance. The lowest elevation of the trail in Colorado is 8,044 feet (2,452 m) along the Middle Fork of the Elk River near the border with Wyoming and the highest elevation in Colorado is 14,278 feet (4,352 m) at the summit of Gray's Peak. Several additional mountains with elevations of more than 14,000 feet (4,300 m) are near the trail

Colorado was voted the most difficult state for thru-hikers by 81.2 percent of 235 respondents in a 2022 survey. The CDT traverses many of the highest and wildest mountain ranges of Colorado, frequently at elevations near or above timberline which is about 12,000 feet (3,700 m) in southern Colorado and 10,500 feet (3,200 m) in northern Colorado. In most areas the CDT is well marked. It is concurrent with the Colorado Trail for approximately 200 miles (320 km). Mountain bikes are allowed on parts of the Colorado Trail. Depending on any given year's snow-pack and a hiker's individual schedule, alternative routes are available. Forest fires often result in parts of the trail being closed and the hiker must take alternative routes. Another hazard to hikers is Colorado's 'monsoon season' with violent afternoon thunderstorms that are common in July and August on high mountain ridges

Notable points on the CDT in Colorado from south to north include:

- Cumbres and Toltec Scenic Railroad. The CDT crosses the narrow-gauge heritage railroad 3 miles (4.8 km) inside Colorado.
- South San Juan Wilderness. The hiker entering the southern San Juan Mountains until mid-June often finds nearly impassable snow-packs and hazardous conditions. Many take a lower and less difficult route.
- Wolf Creek Pass. The CDT crosses U.S. Highway 160 near a ski area.
- Creede cut off. Due to snow or forest fires in the San Juan Mountains many hikers choose to take this lower and shorter route which follows the Rio Grande River through Creede and rejoins the main CDT at Spring Creek Pass
- San Juan Mountains and Weminuche Wilderness. The CDT follows high ridgelines at elevations of more than 12,000 feet (3,700 m). A 32 mi (51 km) section of the CDT never drops below 12,000 ft (3,700 m). In a 2019 survey, the San Juans were voted fourth among favorite sections of the CDT. Snow can be a major problem for hikers, requiring alternate routes, until late June and again in October.
- Salida. In a 2019 survey, Salida was voted the most popular resupply town near the CDT.
- Collegiate Peaks Wilderness. Mount Harvard, Mount Yale, Mount Princeton, Mount Columbia and Mount Oxford, all more than 14,000 feet (4,300 m) in elevation, are near the CDT.
- Twin Lakes. At mile number 369 in Colorado for north-bound hikers, Twin Lakes is the first town in Colorado located on the CDT and is a rest and resupply center.
- Mount Elbert and Mount Massive. Colorado's highest peaks are near the CDT.
- Grays Peak. The highest summit on the CDT has an elevation of 14,278 feet (4,352 m)
- Grand Lake. The CDT follows the shorelines of Lake Granby, Shadow Mountain Lake, and Grand Lake to the rest and resupply village of Grand Lake.
- Rocky Mountain National Park. The CDT passes through a corner of the park. Numerous side trails lead to other locations.
- Parkview Mountain. The 12,301 feet (3,749 m) peak is the most northern place where the CDT reaches an elevation of 12,000 feet (3,700 m) (although peaks near the trail in Wyoming exceed that elevation). The trail to the summit is the steepest mile on the official CDT, a 1,400 feet (430 m) climb in 1.1 miles (1.8 km). (Some approach and alternate trails of the CDT are steeper.)
- Elk River. The lowest elevation of the CDT in Colorado is 8,044 feet (2,452 m) near the border with Wyoming

=== Wyoming ===
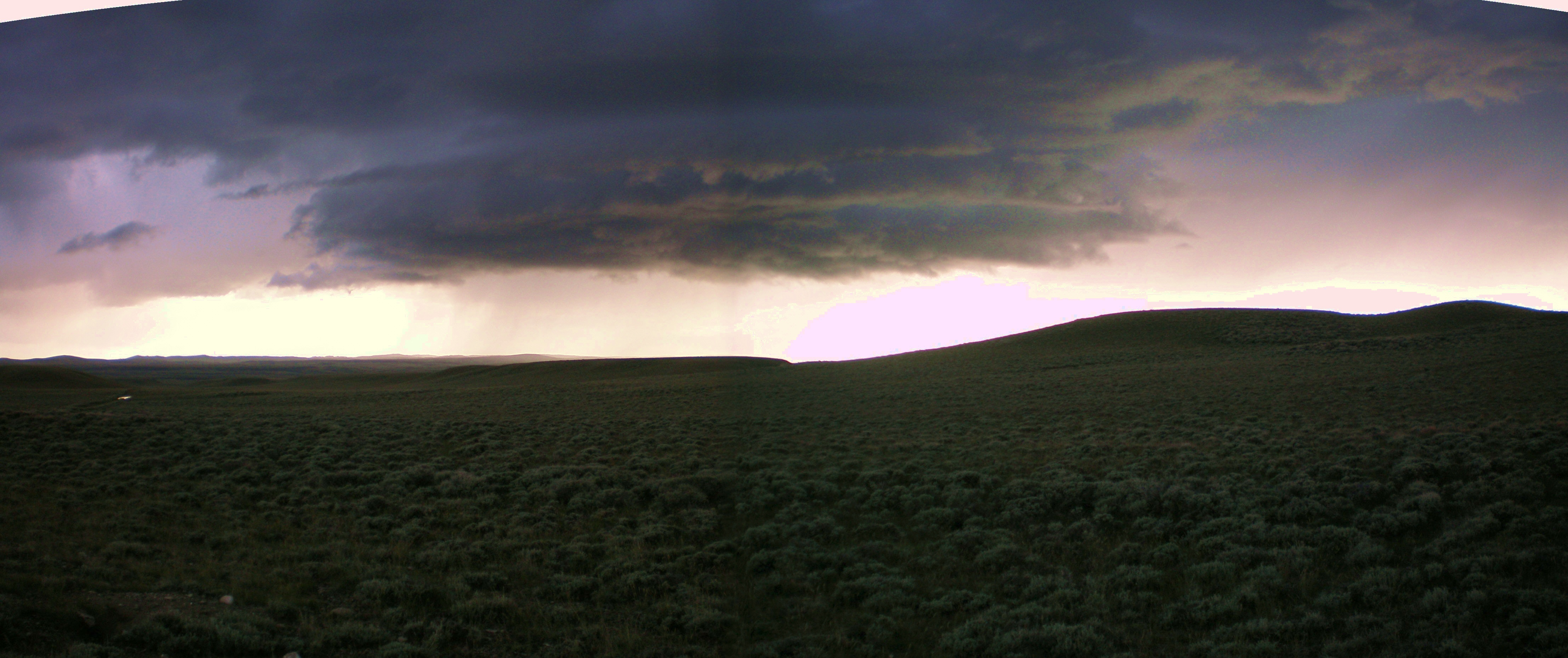
Lightning and hail storms appear with little warning in the Great Divide Basin of Wyoming; there is no place to hide.

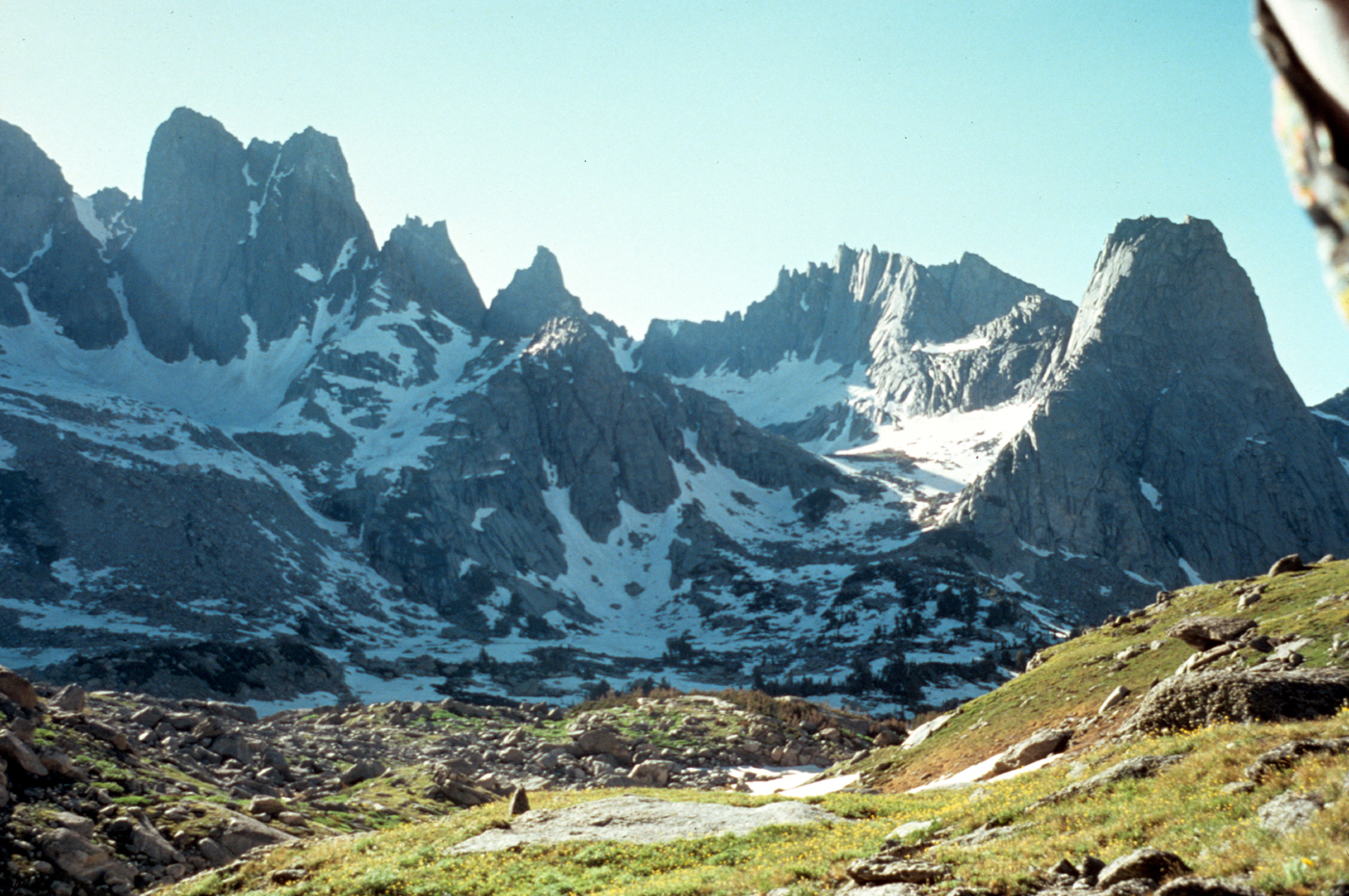
The Cirque of the Towers in the Wind River Range of Wyoming is one of the scenic highlights near the trail.

The official route of the CDT in Wyoming is 513 miles (826 km) long, although several alternate routes shorten or lengthen that distance. The lowest elevation of the trail in Wyoming is 6,522 feet (1,988 m) about 12 miles (19 km) north of Rawlins. and the highest elevation in Wyoming is 11,115 feet (3,388 m) at Lester Pass in the Bridger Wilderness of the Wind River Range.

The Rocky Mountains of Colorado terminate in southern Wyoming and the CDT passes through a long section of desert range-land in the middle of the state, known as the Great Divide Basin. Hikers must decide on a route through the Great Divide Basin as the actual Continental Divide forks, forming an endorheic basin. The shortest route is through the middle where water availability is uncertain in most years. Leaving the Basin, the CDT traverses the remote and rugged 'bench' of the Wind River Range, climbing to above timberline which is about 10,000 feet (3,000 m) in this area, and then through the Absaroka Range in the northwest portion of the state. The grand finale of the CDT in Wyoming is Yellowstone National Park. The trail exits west to Idaho. Grizzly bears become a possible danger from the Wind River Range northward, especially in and near Yellowstone Park.

Notable points in Wyoming on the CDT from south to north include:

- Bridger Peak. At 11,004 feet (3,354 m) the last major summit of the Rocky Mountains before descending into the Red Desert.
- Rawlins. The CDT passes through this resupply center and crosses Interstate 80.
- Great Divide Basin. For more than 100 miles from Rawlins to the Wind River Range, the CDT runs through the gently-rolling, water-scarce Red Desert.
- South Pass. The Oregon Trail, the California Trail and the Mormon Trail traversed this area in the 19th century.
- Wind River Range. More than 120 miles (190 km) of the CDT runs along the flanks of the rugged Winds, voted in 2019 the favorite section of the CDT. Wilderness areas comprise 730,000 acres (300,000 ha) of roadless land dotted with lakes, glaciers and peaks rising near the trail to a maximum of 13,810 feet (4,210 m)
- Cirque of the Towers. 3 miles (4.8 km) from the CDT, regarded as the most scenic vista of the Wind River Range.
- Lester Pass. At an elevation of 11,315 feet (3,449 m), the highest point reached by the CDT in Wyoming.
- Teton Wilderness. Near the CDT is the most remote place in the contiguous United States, 18.76 miles (30.19 km) from the nearest road.
- Yellowstone Park. Traversing the southern part of the Park, the CDT passes by Old Faithful and numerous other geysers and hot springs.

=== Idaho/Montana border ===
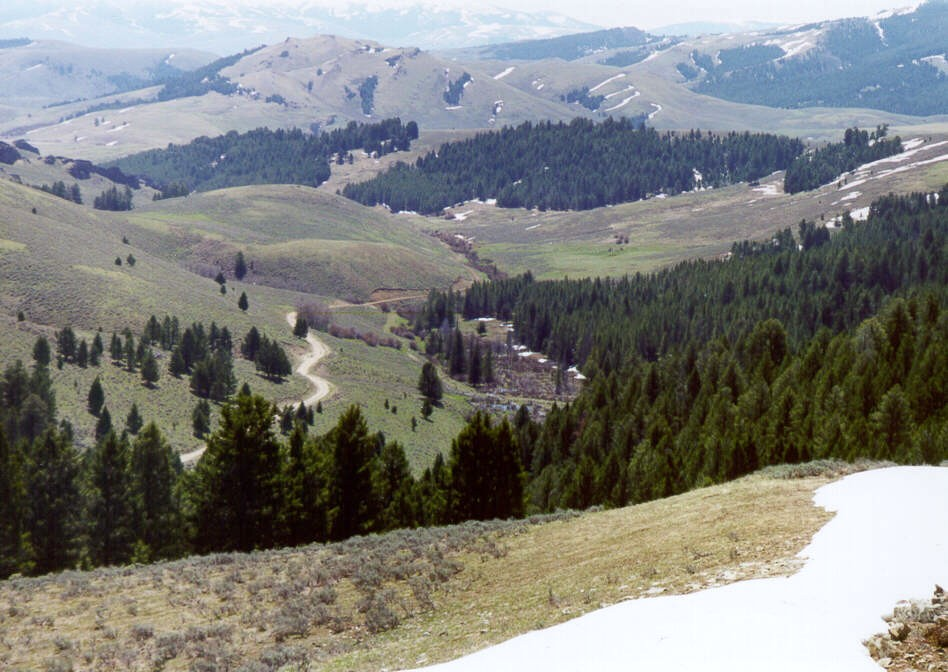
Crossing the Continental Divide at Lemhi Pass; the Lewis and Clark Expedition traversed the pass on August 12, 1805

Northbounders leaving Yellowstone National Park in Wyoming enter the Centennial Mountains of Idaho. For the next 358 miles (576 km) the trail closely follows the border of Idaho and Montana, which is also the Continental Divide. The lowest elevation of the trail on the Idaho/Montana border is 5,764 feet (1,757 m) along the North Fork of Sheep Creek in Idaho and the highest elevation is 10,091 feet (3,076 m) at the summit of Elk Mountain. Timberline along this section of the trail is 8,500 feet (2,600 m) to 9,000 feet (2,700 m) in elevation. Much of the CDT follows high, grassy ridges with some walking on dirt roads required. Water can be scarce and grizzly bears are found near Yellowstone Park.

Notable points on the CDT from south to north along the Idaho/Montana border include:

- Targhee Peak. The peak is near the CDT and has an elevation of 10,300 feet (3,100 m).
- Interstate 15. The CDT crosses the highway at an elevation of 6,756 feet (2,059 m).
- Lemhi Pass. In 1805, Meriwether Lewis of the Lewis and Clark Expedition traversed this pass.
- Elk Mountain. The CDT achieves an elevation of 10,091 feet (3,076 m), the most northerly place on the trail to reach an elevation of more than 10,000 feet (3,000 m).
- Homer Young's Peak. The peak, near the CDT, is the highest along this section of the CDT with an elevation of 10,621 feet (3,237 m).
- North Fork of Sheep Creek. The CDT drops 3,000 feet (910 m) from the Continental Divide to the lowest point on the Idaho/Montana trail, 5,764 feet (1,757 m).
- Chief Joseph Pass. Chief Joseph and the Nez Percé people, pursued by the U.S. Cavalry, crossed from Idaho into Montana near this pass in 1877 during their flight toward Canada.

=== Montana ===
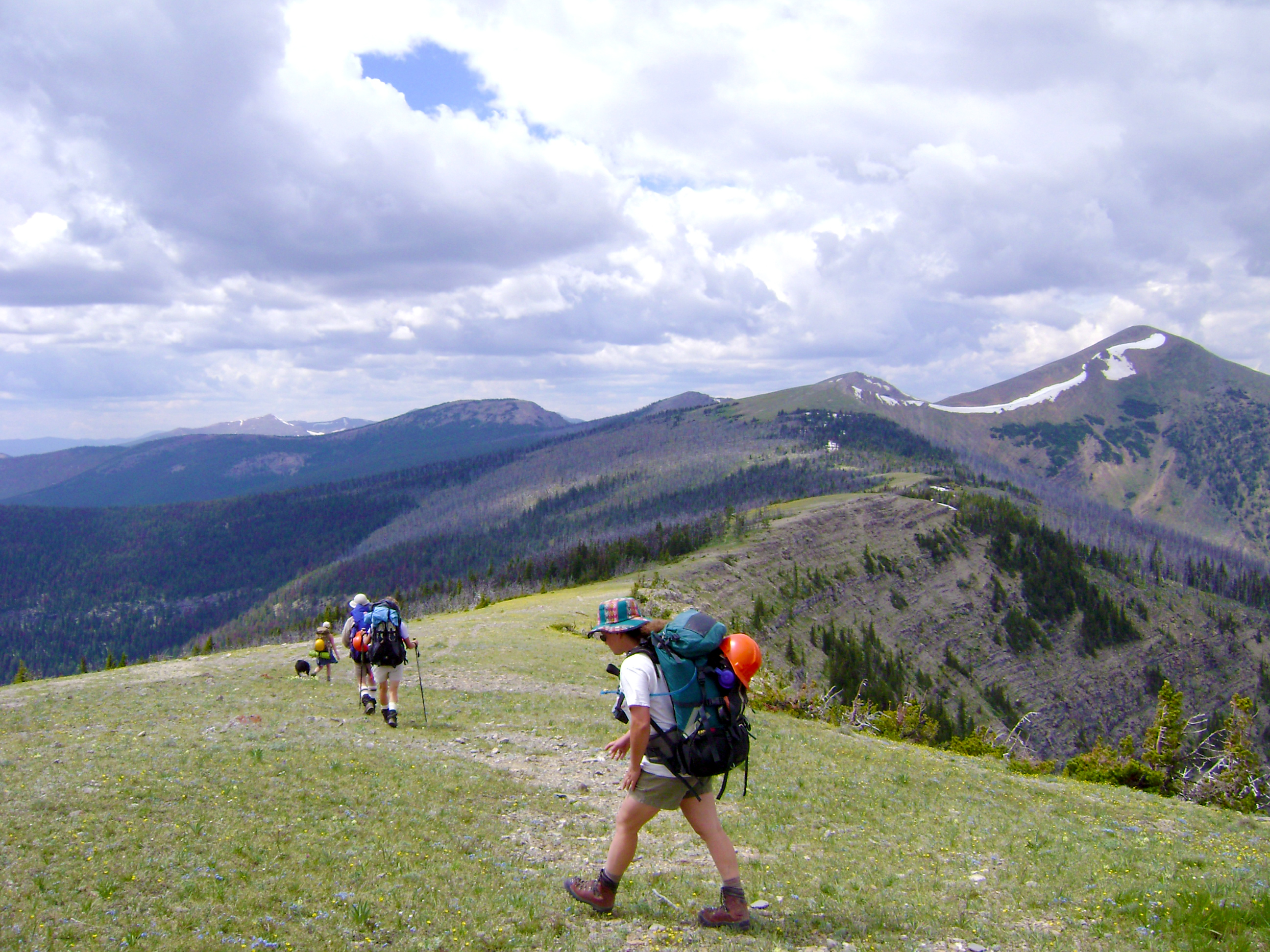
Volunteers hike to camp in the Bob Marshall Wilderness, Montana. The Montana Wilderness Association coordinates free volunteer vacations through its trail program, CDT Montana.

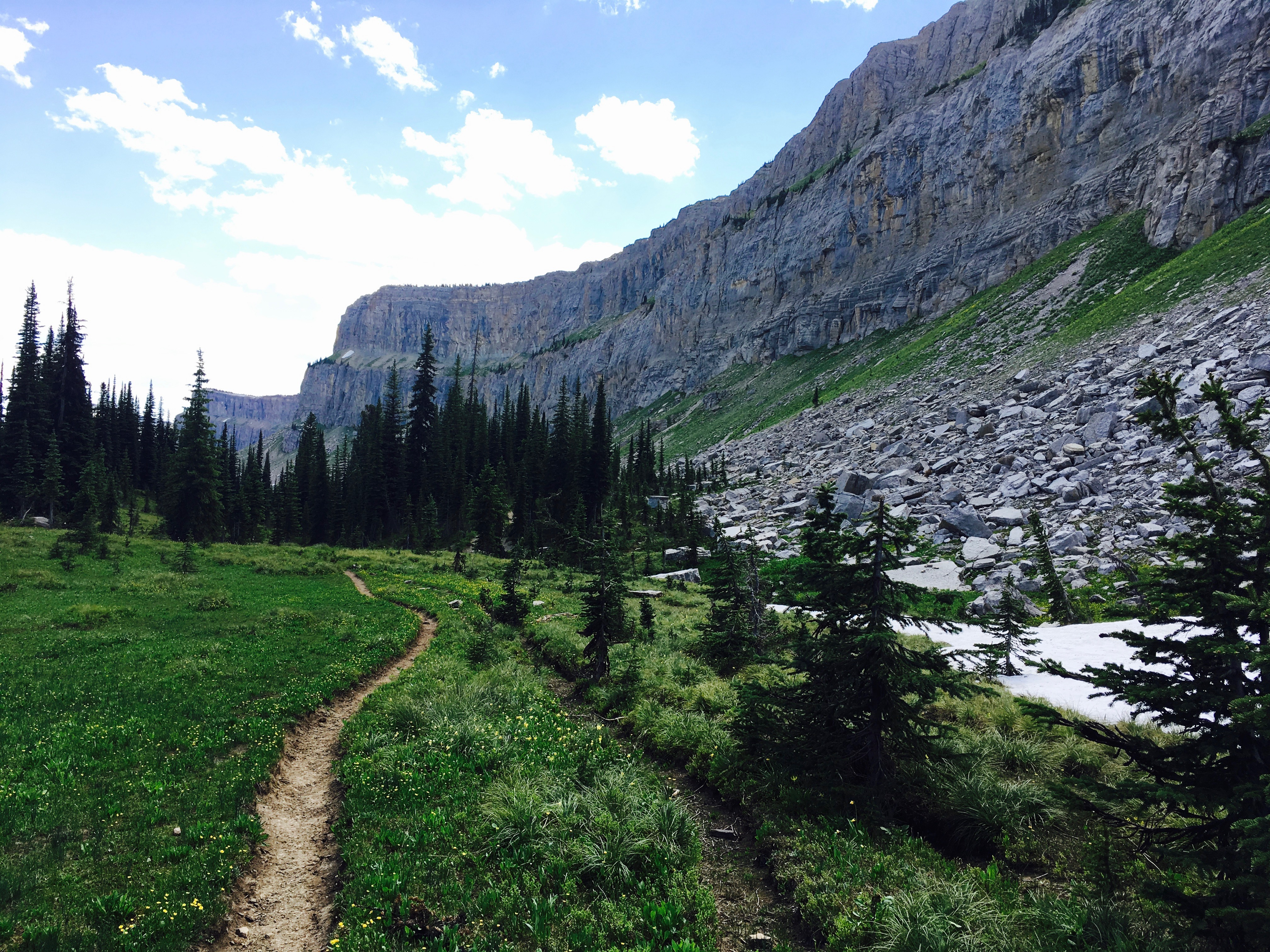
The Chinese Wall looms over the CDT in the Bob Marshall Wilderness Area (8 July 2017).

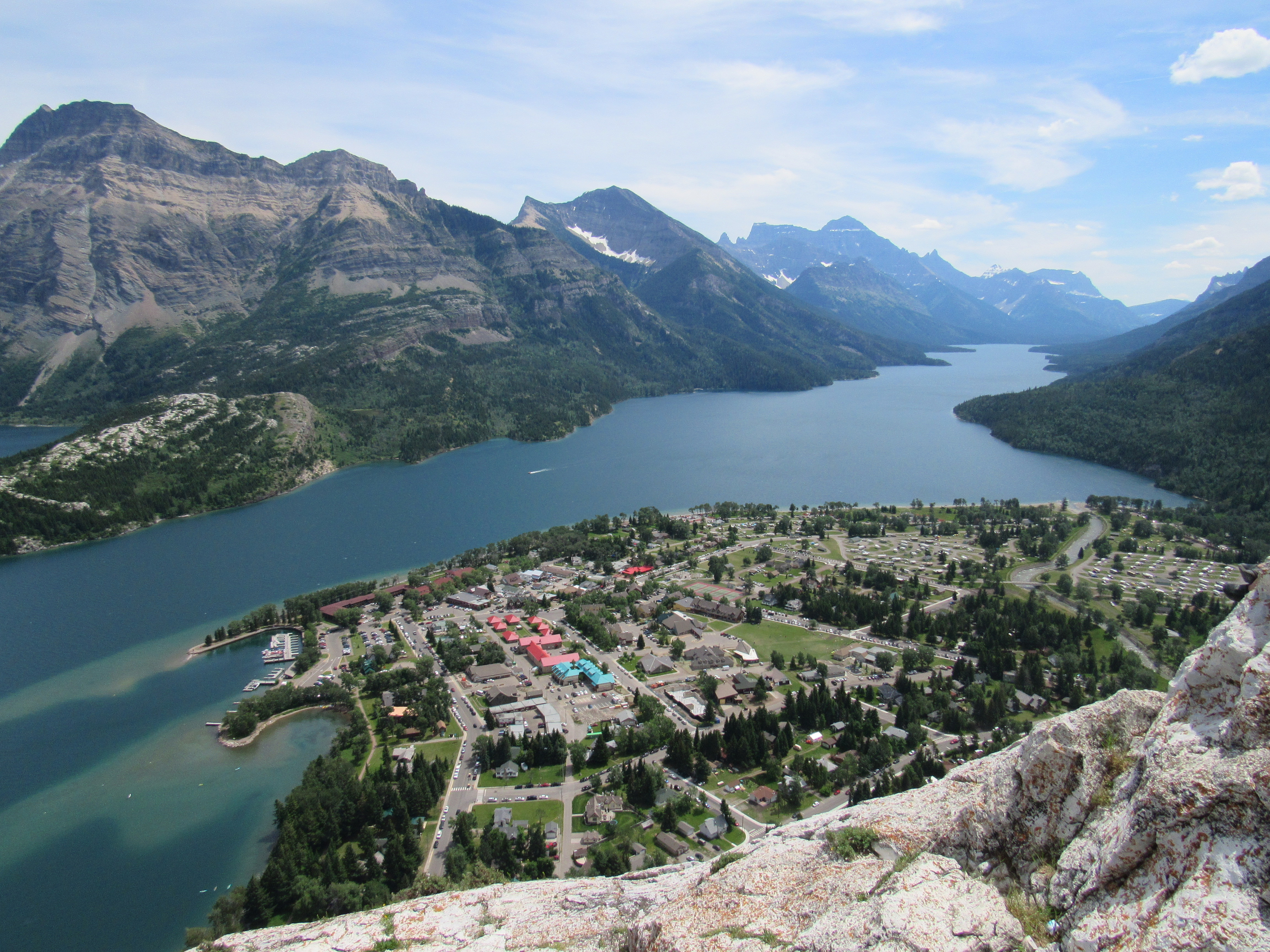
Many hikers begin or end their journey at Waterton, 4 miles (6.4 km) inside Canada.

Leaving the Idaho/Montana border, the Montana portion of the CDT is 627 miles (1,009 km) in length although several alternate routes shorten or lengthen that distance. The lowest elevation of the trail in Montana after leaving the Idaho/Montana border is 4,215 feet (1,285 m) at Upper Waterton Lake which straddles the U.S./Canada border. The highest elevation is 9,324 feet (2,842 m) in the Anaconda-Pintler Wilderness. Timberline can be as low as 6,000 feet (1,800 m) in Glacier National Park at the Canadian border and as high as 9,000 feet (2,700 m) in the southern part of Montana. The Montana Wilderness Association is the leading non-profit partner for the northern section of the CDT. MWA staff work to maintain the CDT in Montana and Idaho with the help of volunteers and agency partners.

The CDT trail goes east from the Idaho border, circles around the city of Butte, then turns north toward Glacier National Park via the Lewis and Clark National Forest and through three National Wilderness areas. Several alternate trails shorten the meandering route of the official CDT in Montana. Some road walking is required on the alternate routes. Frequent forest fires in late summer often force closure of sections of the trail and early snowfalls in late September may make the trail in Glacier National Park impassable.

Notable points from south to north on the CDT in Montana include:

- Anaconda-Pintler Wilderness. West Goat Peak, 10,793 feet (3,290 m), is the highest point near the trail in Montana.
- Anaconda cutoff. Most thru-hikers take this alternate route, which is 60 miles (97 km) shorter than the official CDT and passes through the town of Anaconda.
- Interstate 15. The CDT crosses the highway at an elevation of 5,684 feet (1,732 m).
- Interstate 90. The CDT crosses the highway at an elevation of 6,359 feet (1,938 m).
- Interstate 15. The CDT crosses Interstate 15 again at an elevation of 6,299 feet (1,920 m).
- Bob Marshall Wilderness complex. Most of the 177 miles (285 km) between the CDT crossings of Highways 200 and 2 are in the Scapegoat, "The Bob," and Great Bear wilderness areas The only resupply point near the CDT is the Benchmark Wilderness Ranch, 57 miles (92 km) north of Highway 200.
- Chinese Wall. In the Bob Marshall Wilderness the limestone cliffs of the Chinese Wall rise 1,000 feet (300 m) above the CDT for 22 miles (35 km).
- East Glacier Park Village. At the entrance of Glacier National Park, the CDT is routed through the village and hikers resupply here for long treks whether going north or south.
- Glacier National Park. The park was voted second among favorite sections of the CDT by hikers in 2019. The trails in the park are well-maintained and sometimes crowded. Grizzly bears are present. Due to snow in late September north-bound thru-hikers may take alternate routes to reach the Canadian border by road walking.
- Waterton Park. The village, four miles inside Canada in Waterton Lakes National Park, is the official starting and ending point of the CDT.

== See also ==
Other Triple Crown trails

- Appalachian Trail
- Pacific Crest Trail

Connected National Scenic Trail

- Pacific Northwest Trail - Shares a common start/end point with the CDT in Glacier National Park.

Connected National Historic Trails

- California Trail
- Lewis and Clark National Historic Trail
- Mormon Pioneer Trail
- Nez Perce Trail
- Old Spanish Trail
- Oregon Trail
- Pony Express National Historic Trail

Connected U.S. long-distance trails

- Colorado Trail - the two trails coincide for about 200 miles (320 km)
- Great Divide Mountain Bike Route - parallel, sometimes shared tread
