= Triple Crown of Hiking =

Three major U.S. long-distance hiking trails

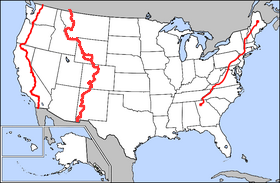
(From left to right) Pacific Crest Trail, Continental Divide Trail and Appalachian Trail

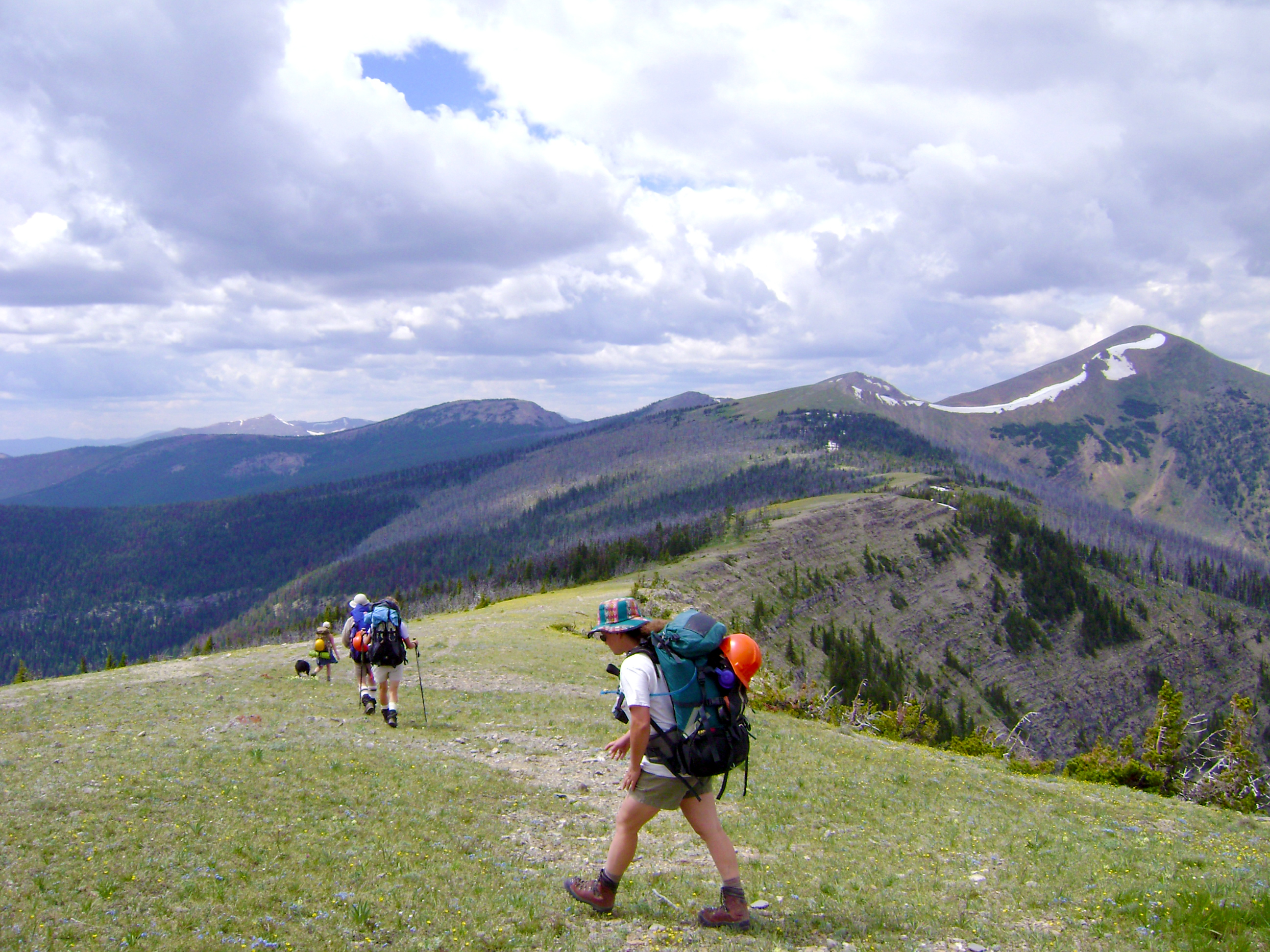
Hikers on the Continental Divide Trail in the Bob Marshall Wilderness Area, Montana.

The Triple Crown of Hiking refers to hiking the entire length of three major U.S. National Scenic Trails:

- Appalachian Trail – 2,194 miles (3,531 km), between Springer Mountain in Georgia and Mount Katahdin in Maine and traversing North Carolina, Tennessee, Virginia, West Virginia, Maryland, Pennsylvania, New Jersey, New York, Connecticut, Massachusetts, Vermont, and New Hampshire.
- Pacific Crest Trail – 2,653 miles (4,270 km), between Mexico and Canada following the highest portion of the Sierra Nevada and Cascade Range and traversing Washington, Oregon, and California.
- Continental Divide Trail – 3,028 miles (4,873 km), between Mexico and Canada following the Continental Divide along the Rocky Mountains and traversing Montana, Idaho, Wyoming, Colorado, and New Mexico.

These three trails were the first designated National Scenic Trails in the National Trails System. Their total length is about 7,875 miles (12,674 km); vertical gain is more than 1,000,000 feet (300,000 m). A total of 22 states are visited if the three trails are completed. The American Long Distance Hiking Association – West (ALDHA–West) is the only organization that recognizes this hiking feat. At the ALDHA–West gathering, held each fall, the Triple Crown honorees are recognized and awarded plaques noting their achievement. As of the end of the application period in 2024, 775 hikers have been designated Triple Crowners by ALDHA-West since 1994.

== History ==
The first person to ever achieve The Triple Crown of Hiking was Eric Ryback. Ryback completed the Appalachian Trail in 1969 as a 16-year-old. He completed the Pacific Crest Trail in 1970 and chronicled it in his 1971 book The High Adventure of Eric Ryback: Canada to Mexico on Foot. Ryback completed a route approximating today's Continental Divide Trail in 1972 and chronicled it in his second book, The Ultimate Journey (now out of print).

In 2013, Reed Gjonnes, age 13, became the youngest person to thru-hike the official routes of all 3 trails to complete the Triple Crown. A thru-hike is defined as completing a long trail in a single trip. She hiked all three trails as continuous northbound hikes in one hiking season each. Along with her father Eric Gjonnes, she hiked The Pacific Crest Trail in 2011, the Appalachian Trail in 2012, and the entire 3,100 mile official route of the Continental Divide Trail in 2013.

The title of Youngest Triple Crown Hiker belongs to Christian "Buddy Backpacker" Geiger, who was aged 9, when he finished all three trails in 2018. Buddy and his family hiked every single official mile on all three long trails. Along with his step-father Dion Pagonis, the two completed the Appalachian Trail in 2013 when Buddy was 5, the Pacific Crest Trail when he was 6 in 2014, and completed the Continental Divide Trail in two trips. He began the spring of 2016 and completed it in September 2017 when he was 9.

In 2023 Juniper Netteburg (aged 7 at the completion of her family's hike), is the youngest person to have hiked almost all of the three long trails, skipping few sections on the CDT and PCT, as well as using alternate routes. Netteburg, known by her trail name The Beast, completed all three trails with her mother (Danae), father (Olen) and her four other siblings, the youngest being two at the end. Together they completed the Appalachian Trail in 2020 (Juniper aged 4), the Continental Divide Trail using official and alternate routes, when she was 6 in 2022, and began the Pacific Crest Trail in May 2023 and completed it in November 2023 just days before she turned 8.

In 2018, Elsye Walker, known as Chardonnay on the trail, became the first African American to complete the Triple Crown. She thru-hiked the Pacific Crest Trail in 2015, the Appalachian Trail in 2016/2018, and in 2017 she thru-hiked the Continental Divide Trail.

On September 15, 2019, combat veteran Will Robinson, age 38, became the first African American man to complete the Triple Crown. Will thru-hiked the Pacific Crest Trail in 2017, the Appalachian Trail in 2018, and completed the Continental Divide Trail in 2019. Will's trail name is Akuna, from the Swahili phrase Hakuna Matata meaning "no worries", and made popular by a song in The Lion King.

== Calendar-year Triple Crown ==
A prestigious accomplishment in long-distance hiking is the completion of the Triple Crown of Hiking in a single calendar year (January 1 through December 31). The first person to hike the Triple Crown in a calendar year was "Flyin" Brian Robinson, who completed the Triple Crown in 2001. The first woman to complete the challenge was Heather "Anish" Anderson in 2018.

By the end of 2018, only ten people had completed the Triple Crown within one calendar year, Anderson being the only woman. The three long distance hikes can technically be done continuously in one season—however, because of snow, they are generally attempted in sections. Most CYTC (calendar-year triple crown) finishers "flip flop" across the three trails through the year, hiking sections that are the best suited for the time of year. In 2005, Matt "Squeaky" Hazely was the first person to complete a CYTC without flipping, where he hiked each trail in its entirety (either northbound or southbound) before progressing to the next one.

== See also ==
- Appalachian Long Distance Hikers Association (ALDHA–East)
- Backpacking (hiking)
- European long-distance paths, 11 European long-distance paths
- Long-distance trail
- Long-distance trails in the United States
- National Millennium Trails, 16 trails reflecting U.S. history and culture
- Thru-hiking
