= Thru-hiking =

Continuous end-to-end hiking of a long-distance trail

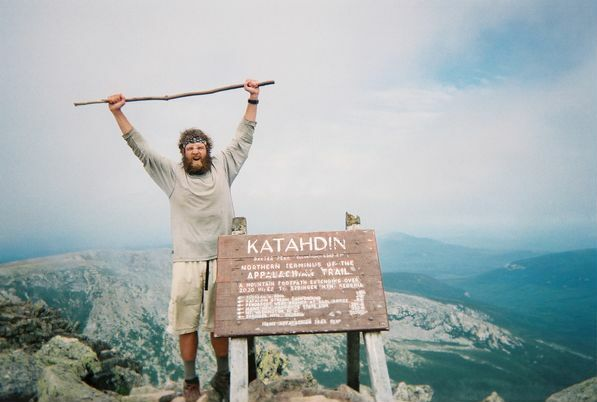
A hiker completes the Appalachian Trail

Thru-hiking, or through-hiking, is the continuous end-to-end hiking of an established long-distance trail. The term is used especially in North America in reference to trails such as the Appalachian Trail (AT), the Pacific Crest Trail (PCT), and the Continental Divide Trail (CDT). Similar end-to-end hikes are also undertaken on long-distance footpaths in other parts of the world, including Te Araroa in New Zealand, the Camino de Santiago in Spain and France, the Via Francigena in Europe, the Great Divide Trail in Canada, and the Great Himalaya Trail in Nepal.

A hike completed over multiple trips rather than in one continuous journey is generally known as section hiking.

== History ==
During the late 19th and early 20th centuries, long-distance walking and hiking became increasingly popular in the United States. This period saw the establishment of dedicated trails such as the Long Trail in Vermont and the John Muir Trail in California.

The trail most closely associated with the development of thru-hiking in the United States is the Appalachian Trail, proposed in 1921 by Benton MacKaye and completed in 1937. Myron Avery, an early promoter of the trail, traversed its full length in sections while helping to develop and mark the route. In 1948, Earl Shaffer completed what is generally regarded as the first continuous south-to-north thru-hike of the Appalachian Trail. In 1951, Chester Dziengielewski completed a continuous north-to-south thru-hike.

Emma "Grandma" Gatewood became one of the best-known early thru-hikers after completing the Appalachian Trail in 1955 at the age of 67. Her hike, undertaken with relatively simple equipment, has often been cited in discussions of the history of lightweight and ultralight backpacking.

== Practice ==
A thru-hike typically takes several months to complete and often requires planning in advance. Hikers may rely on mailed resupply packages or purchase food and other necessities in towns near the trail.

According to the Appalachian Trail Conservancy, only a minority of Appalachian Trail thru-hike attempts are completed; the organization reported completion rates of about 25% in recent years. The most common reasons for abandoning a thru-hike include injury, financial constraints, limited time, and loss of motivation.

Ultralight backpacking is popular among thruhikers. Lightweight shelters and backpacks made out of dyneema are increasingly common. Many hikers discard excess gear along the way, with successful PCT hikers shedding an average of 2 pounds of gear over the course of the trail in 2025.

Long-distance hikers who have completed the Appalachian Trail, Pacific Crest Trail, and Continental Divide Trail are known as Triple Crowners.

== Related terms ==
Flip Flopping refers to hiking sections of a trail out of order, such as first hiking north from the midpoint of the trail, then traveling to the midpoint again and hiking south.

NOBO and SOBO are commonly used to describe hiking direction of northbound or southbound on a thruhike, especially on the triple crown trails. Less common variants include EABO and WEBO for eastbound and westbound such as on the Pacific Northwest Trail, or CLOBO and COCLOBO for clockwise bound and counter-clockwise bound such as on the Tahoe Rim Trail.

Section hiking is the completion of a long-distance trail over multiple trips rather than in a single continuous journey. In common usage, a section hike is distinguished from a thru-hike by the lack of continuity between sections.

== See also ==
- Backpacking (hiking)
- Long-distance trail
- List of long-distance footpaths
- Triple Crown of Hiking
- Tramping in New Zealand
