= Cove Mountain =

Cove Mountain may refer to:

- Cove Mountain, Virginia, a wildland area in the George Washington and Jefferson National Forests of western Virginia
- Cove Mountain, Down, a 655 m mountain in the Mourne Mountains in County Down in Ireland
- Cove Mountain, Pennsylvania, a mountain in the Ridge and Valley region of the Appalachian Mountains, located near Duncannon
