= Murders of Molly LaRue and Geoff Hood =

1990 murders in the United States

Molly LaRue (February 10, 1965 – September 13, 1990) and Geoff Hood (c. 1964 – September 13, 1990) were thru-hikers on the Appalachian Trail. The couple began their southbound journey in Maine with plans to complete the entire trail before starting graduate school. They were murdered by Paul David Crews on September 13, 1990, and their bodies were discovered in Perry County, near Duncannon, Pennsylvania.

== Life ==
Molly Ann LaRue, an avid backpacker and climber since age 12, was born in Ohio to Jim, a minister, (c. 1937-) and Connie (c. 1938-2006), a nurse. LaRue's 1982 stamp design won the US Post Office national stamp design contest for students and was issued October 1, 1984 in her hometown of Shaker Heights. She was a fine arts student at Ohio Wesleyan University and graduated in 1987. LaRue was an emergency medical technician and licensed Outward Bound instructor.

Geoffrey Hood was from Signal Mountain, Tennessee and graduated with a teaching degree from the University of Tennessee. He was the son of Glenda and had a younger sister, Marla.

LaRue and Hood met in Salina, Kansas, while working for a church-sponsored program designed to introduce at-risk children to nature. They had planned to build a life together, including starting their own organization to help children. They intended to start graduate school in January 1991, after hiking the Appalachian Trail together.

On June 4, 1990, they began their trip at the northern terminus of the trail at Mount Katahdin, Maine, having climbed the mile-high peak the previous day. LaRue and Hood shared a journal and wrote in trail registers, using the trail names Nalgene and Clevis, respectively. LaRue wrote in a logbook entry, “If you’re behind us you will pass us.” The couple stopped to look at plants and animals, take photographs and even bake bread.

On September 11, 1990, LaRue and Hood stayed in Duncannon at the Doyle Hotel. The next day, they went to lunch with LaRue’s great-aunt Kathryn Barnitz, and Barnitz’s cousin and his wife. LaRue and Hood talked about their hike so far, their previous teaching jobs and future plans. They also mentioned that they were looking forward to reuniting with their families in Harper’s Ferry the following week. After lunch, LaRue and Hood posed for pictures before returning to the trail to continue their trek.

== Murders ==
On the morning of September 13, 1990, LaRue and Hood were murdered by Paul David Crews. LaRue was found with rope around her neck and her hands tied behind her back, having been raped and stabbed 8 times in the neck, throat, and back. Hood had been shot three times with a .22 caliber pistol.

Their bodies were discovered in the Thelma Marks Shelter on Cove Mountain, in Perry County, Pennsylvania, by Cindi, also a teacher, and Brian “Biff” Bowen. The Bowens were another southbound thru-hiker couple who had been following LaRue and Hood’s journey progress in trail registers, having heard about them from other hikers and believed they would eventually catch up with them on the trail.

Friday, September 21, 1990, a man claiming to be David “Casey” Horn was taken into custody while hiking near Harper’s Ferry, West Virginia and charged with the homicide of LaRue and Hood. He had been reported for looking out of place with a large backpack. In custody under the alias David Horn, he was identified after his fingerprints, photo, and shoulder tattoo were linked to an outstanding arrest warrant for Paul David Crews in connection with a 1986 Florida homicide and robbery.

== Conviction ==
Crews was convicted on two counts of first-degree murder and sentenced to death. Following several appeals, the prosecution agreed to forgo the death penalty and Crews was instead sentenced to two consecutive life sentences. He died in prison in July 2022 at the age of 70.

== Legacy ==
In October 2000, Jim and Connie LaRue and Glenda Hood hiked Cove Mountain, where along with 40 other hikers, they dedicated a new shelter to LaRue and Hood, named Cove Mountain Shelter. The new shelter replaced the Thelma Marks Shelter.

The Reds. the Yellows. the Blues., a book LaRue had written and illustrated in the late 1980s while she was a student at Ohio Wesleyan University was published November 3, 2018 by her father.
