= Appalachian Trail =

Hiking trail going through 14 US states

- Appalachian Trail logo
- Length: 2,197.4 mi (3,536.4 km) in 2024
- Location: Appalachian Mountains
- Designation: National Scenic Trail
- Trailheads: Springer Mountain, Georgia; Mount Katahdin, Maine
- Use: Hiking, backpacking
- Highest point: Kuwohi, 6,643 ft (2,025 m)
- Lowest point: Bear Mountain State Park, 124 ft (38 m)
- Difficulty: Easy to strenuous
- Season: Early spring to autumn for thru-hikers; year-round for other users
- Hazards: Severe weather American black bears Tick-borne diseases Mosquitos; Yellowjackets; Biting flies Chiggers; Steep grades Limited water Dangerous fordings Diarrhea from water Poison ivy Venomous snakes
- Website: Appalachian National Scenic Trail

Trail map
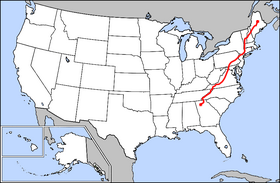

The Appalachian Trail, also called the A.T., is a hiking trail in the Eastern United States, extending almost 2,200 miles (3,540 km) between Springer Mountain in Georgia and Mount Katahdin in Maine, and passing through 14 states. The Appalachian Trail Conservancy claims the Appalachian Trail to be the world's longest hiking-only trail. More than three million people hike segments of it each year.

The trail was first proposed in 1921 and completed in 1937. Improvements and changes have continued since then. It became the Appalachian National Scenic Trail under the National Trails System Act of 1968.

The trail is maintained by 31 trail clubs and multiple partnerships and managed by the National Park Service, United States Forest Service, and the nonprofit Appalachian Trail Conservancy. Most of the trail is in forest or wild lands, but some parts traverse towns, roads, and farms. From south to north it passes through Georgia, North Carolina, Tennessee, Virginia, West Virginia, Maryland, Pennsylvania, New Jersey, New York, Connecticut, Massachusetts, Vermont, New Hampshire, and Maine.

Thru-hikers walk the entire trail within a 12-month period. The number of thru-hikes per year has increased steadily since 2010, with 715 northbound and 133 southbound thru-hikes reported in 2017. The Appalachian Trail Conservancy estimates there are over 3,000 attempts to traverse the entire trail each year, about 25% of which succeed. Many books, documentaries, and websites are dedicated to the pursuit. Some hike from one end to the other, then turn around and thru-hike the other way, a "yo-yo".

Affiliated trail sections extend from either end from the north as the International Appalachian Trail into Canada and beyond, and from the south as the Eastern Continental Trail into the Southeastern states of Alabama and Florida.

The Appalachian Trail, the Continental Divide Trail, and the Pacific Crest Trail informally constitute the Triple Crown of Hiking in the United States.

== History ==
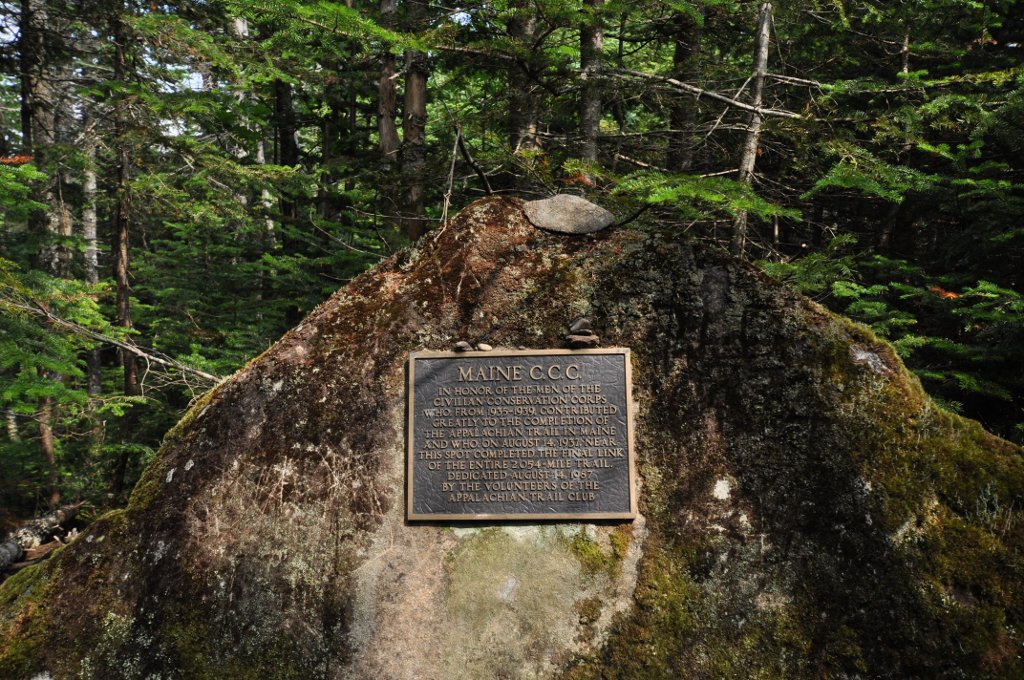
A marker on the trail near Sugarloaf Mountain in Maine

The trail was conceived by Benton MacKaye, a forester who wrote his original plan—called "An Appalachian Trail, A Project in Regional Planning"—shortly after his wife's death in 1921. MacKaye's idea detailed a grand trail that would connect a series of farms and wilderness work/study camps for city-dwellers along the Appalachian Mountains from the highest point in the North (Mount Washington in New Hampshire) to the highest in the South (Mount Mitchell in North Carolina). Hiking was an incidental focus of his plan. In 1922, at the suggestion of Major William A. Welch, director of the Palisades Interstate Park Commission, his idea was publicized by Raymond H. Torrey with a story in the New York Evening Post under a large headline reading "A Great Trail from Maine to Georgia"

On October 7, 1923, the first section of the trail, from Bear Mountain west through Harriman State Park to Arden, New York, was opened. MacKaye then called for a two-day Appalachian Trail conference to be held in March 1925 in Washington, D.C. This meeting inspired the formation of the Appalachian Trail Conference, now called the Appalachian Trail Conservancy (ATC). Arthur Perkins, a retired judge, and his younger associate Myron Avery took up the cause.

In 1929, Perkins, who was also a member of the Connecticut Forest and Park Association and its Blue Blazed Trails committee, found Ned Anderson, a farmer in Sherman, Connecticut, who took on the task of mapping and blazing the Connecticut leg of the trail (1929–1933). It ran from Dog Tail Corners in Webatuck, New York, which borders Kent, Connecticut, at Ashley Falls, 50 miles (80 km) through the northwest corner of the state, up to Bear Mountain at the Massachusetts state line. A portion of the Connecticut trail has since been rerouted (1979–1983) to be more scenic, adhering less to highways and more to wilderness, and includes the Ned K. Anderson Memorial Bridge.

Anderson's efforts helped spark renewed interest in the trail, and Avery, who led the project after Perkins's death in 1932, was able to bring other states on board. Upon taking over the ATC, Avery adopted the goal to build a simple hiking trail. He and MacKaye clashed over the ATC's response to the construction of a road that overlapped part within Shenandoah National Park; MacKaye left the organization, while Avery was willing to reroute the trail. Avery served as Chair of the ATC from 1932 to 1952, the year he died. He was the first to walk the trail end-to-end, though not as a thru-hike, in 1936. In August 1937, the trail was completed to Sugarloaf Mountain in Maine, and the ATC shifted its focus toward protecting the trail lands and mapping the trail for hikers.

In 1977, the Appalachian Trail Conference honored Paul M. Fink as "the guiding influence" in establishing the Trail in Tennessee and North Carolina in the 1920s. Fink was inducted into the Appalachian Trail Hall of Fame in 2019. In 1922, only a year after MacKaye's article proposing an Appalachian Trail was written, Fink began corresponding with hiking leaders in New England about building the Trail. When Avery began planning the Trail's route in the south, Fink was the first person he contacted.

Many of the trail's present highlights were not part of the trail in 1937: Roan Mountain, North Carolina and Tennessee; the Mount Rogers high country, including Grayson Highlands, Virginia; the Pochuck Creek swamp, New Jersey; Nuclear Lake, New York; Thundering Falls, Vermont; and Saddleback Mountain, Maine. Except for places where the Civilian Conservation Corps was brought in (mostly in Shenandoah National Park, the Great Smoky Mountains, and Maine), the original trail often climbed straight up and down mountains, creating rough hiking conditions and a treadway prone to severe erosion. The ATC's trail crews and volunteer trail-maintaining clubs have relocated or rehabilitated miles of trail since then.

In 1936, a 121-day Maine to Georgia veteran's group funded and supported thru-hike was reported to have been completed, with all but three miles of the new trail cleared and blazed, by six Boy Scouts from New York City and their guides. The thru-hike was much later recorded and accepted by the Appalachian Long Distance Hikers Association. In 1938, the trail sustained major damage from a hurricane that went through the New England area. This was soon before the start of World War II, and many of the people working on the trail were called to active duty.

In 1948, Earl Shaffer of York, Pennsylvania, brought a great deal of attention to the project by publicizing the first claimed thru-hike. The claim was later criticized for the hike's omission of significant portions due to shortcuts and car rides. Shaffer later claimed the first north-to-south thru-hike, the first to claim to do so in each direction. Chester Dziengielewski was later named the first southbound thru-hiker. In 1998, Shaffer, nearly 80 years old, hiked the trail, making him the oldest person to claim a completed thru-hike. The first woman to walk the trail in a single season was Peace Pilgrim in 1952, while the first solo woman to complete the hike was 67-year-old Emma Gatewood, who did it northbound in 1955, taking 146 days. She repeated the achievement two years later, and then section-hiked it in 1964.

In the 1960s, the ATC made progress toward protecting the trail from development, thanks to efforts of politicians and officials. Wisconsin senator Gaylord Nelson offered legislation to protect the route. The National Trails System Act of 1968 designated the Pacific Crest Trail and Appalachian Trail as the first national scenic trails and paved the way for a series of such trails within the national park and national forest systems. Trail volunteers worked with the National Park Service to map a permanent route for the trail, and by 1971 a permanent route had been marked, though minor changes continue to this day. By the close of the 20th century, the Park Service had completed the purchase of all but a few miles of the trail's span.

== Extensions ==
The International Appalachian Trail is a 1,900-mile (3,100 km) extension running northeast from Maine into New Brunswick and Quebec's Gaspé Peninsula, where it ends at Forillon National Park. It is a separate trail and not an official extension of the Appalachian Trail. Other branches are designated in parts of Nova Scotia, Prince Edward Island, and along the western shore of Newfoundland, to the northern end of the Appalachian Mountain range, where it enters the Atlantic Ocean, near L'Anse aux Meadows National Historic Site. The route has since been extended to Greenland, Europe, and Morocco.

Although the Appalachian Trail ends in Georgia, the Appalachian Mountains continue south to Flagg Mountain in Alabama. In 2008, the Pinhoti National Recreation Trail in Alabama and Georgia, which terminates at Flagg Mountain, was connected to the southern terminus of the Appalachian Trail via the Benton MacKaye Trail. Promoters of the Southern extension refer to MacKaye's statement at the 1925 conference that the Georgia to New Hampshire trail should, in the future, extend to Katahdin, and "then to Birmingham, Alabama". As of March 2015, The Pinhoti Trail terminates at the base of Flagg Mountain, near Weogufka in Coosa County, 50 miles (80 km) east of Birmingham. In 2010, the Alabama state legislature formed the Alabama Appalachian Mountain Trail Commission to provide state resources for trail improvements, although officially designating Pinhoti as part of the Appalachian Trail would require an act of the United States Congress.

The 8.8-mile (14.2 km) Appalachian Approach Trail in Georgia begins at Amicalola Falls State Park's visitor center and ends at Springer Mountain. Because Springer Mountain is in a remote area, the Approach Trail is often the beginning of North bound thru-hike attempts. Much of the Approach Trail was originally built as part of the Appalachian Trail, before the southern terminus was relocated from Mount Oglethorpe to Springer Mountain in 1958.

== Flora and fauna ==
The Appalachian Trail is home to thousands of species of plants and animals, including 2,000 rare, threatened, endangered, and sensitive plant and animal species.

=== Animals ===
The American black bear (Ursus americanus), among the largest animals along the Appalachian Trail, rarely confronts people. The black bear is the largest omnivore that may be encountered on the trail, and it inhabits all regions of the Appalachians. Bear sightings on the trail are uncommon, except in certain sections, especially Shenandoah National Park and portions of New Jersey, New York, Connecticut, and Massachusetts sections, where bear populations have increased steadily since 1980; confrontations are rarer still.

Other hazards include venomous snakes, including the Eastern timber rattlesnake and copperhead, which are common along the trail. Both snakes are generally found in drier, rockier sections of the trail. The copperhead's range extends north to around the New Jersey–New York state line, while rattlesnakes are commonly found along the trail in Connecticut and have been reported, although rarely, as far north as New Hampshire. Other large mammals commonly sighted include deer; elk, reintroduced in the Smoky Mountains; and moose, which may be found in the vicinity of Massachusetts and northward.

Small mammal species that inhabit along the trails are beaver, squirrel, river otter, chipmunk, porcupine, bobcat, two species of fox, boar, woodchuck, raccoon, and coyote. Bird species that reside in the trails are wild turkey, ruffed grouse, mourning dove, raven, two species of eagle, wood duck, three species of owl, and three species of hawk as well as warblers. There are different kinds of squirrels along the Appalachian Trail as well, especially in Maine. They are generally smaller and very territorial, and produce a loud call if approached.

For most hikers, the most persistent pests along the trail are ticks, mosquitos, and black flies along with the mice that inhabit shelters.

=== Plants ===
Plant life along the trail is varied. The trail passes through several different biomes from south to north, and the climate changes significantly, particularly dependent upon elevation. In the south, lowland forests consist mainly of second-growth; nearly the entire trail has been logged at one time or another. There are a few old growth locations along the trail, such as Sages Ravine straddling the Massachusetts-Connecticut border and atop higher peaks along the trail on either side of the same border, the Hopper (a glacial cirque westward of the trail as it traverses Mt. Greylock in Massachusetts), and "The Hermitage", near Gulf Hagas in Maine.

In the south, the forest is dominated by hardwoods, including oak and tulip trees, also known as yellow poplar. Farther north, tulip trees are gradually replaced by maples and birches. Oaks begin to disappear in Massachusetts. By Vermont, the lowland forest is made up of maples, birch and beech, with colorful foliage displays in September and October. While the vast majority of lowland forest south of the White Mountains is hardwood, many areas have some coniferous trees as well, and in Maine, these often grow at low elevations.

There is a drastic change between the lowland and subalpine, evergreen forest, and another, higher break, at tree line, above which only hardy alpine plants grow. The sub-alpine region is far more prevalent along the trail than true alpine conditions. While it mainly exists in the north, a few mountains in the south have subalpine environments, which are typically coated in an ecosystem known as the Southern Appalachian spruce-fir forest.

Southern ranges and mountains where sub-alpine environments occur include the Great Smoky Mountains, where sub-alpine environments only begin around 6,000 feet (1,800 m) in elevation, Roan Highlands on the North Carolina-Tennessee border, where sub-alpine growth descends below 6,000 feet (1,800 m), and Mount Rogers and the Grayson Highlands in Virginia, where there is some alpine growth above 5,000 feet (1,500 m). Appalachian balds are also found in the Southern highlands, and are believed to occur due to fires or grazing in recent centuries, or in some cases due to thin, sandy soils. Several balds are sprouting trees, and on some, the National Forest service actually mows the grasses periodically in order to keep the balds free of trees.

== Geography ==
A diagram of the Appalachian Mountain system

There are no subalpine regions between Mount Rogers in Virginia and Mount Greylock in Massachusetts, mainly because the trail stays below 3,000 feet (910 m) from Shenandoah National Park in Virginia to Mount Greylock. But Mount Greylock has a large subalpine region, the only such forest in Massachusetts, extending down to 3,000 feet (910 m), which in the south would be far from the subalpine cutoff. This is especially low because Greylock is exposed to prevailing westerly winds, as the summits along its ridgeline rise about 200 to 650 feet (61 to 198 m) higher than any other peak in Massachusetts. Farther north, several peaks in Vermont reach into the subalpine zone, the bottom of which steadily descends as one proceeds northward, so that by the White Mountains in New Hampshire, it often occurs well below 3,000 feet (910 m). At Mount Moosilauke, which summits at 4,802 feet (1,464 m), the first alpine environment on the trail is reached, where only thin, sporadic flora are interspersed with bare rocks. Between the two regions is the krummholz region, where stunted trees grow with their branches oriented away from the winter's prevailing northwest wind, giving the appearance of flags; they are sometimes called "flag trees". This region resembles lowland terrain hundreds of miles north in Canada. It also contains many endangered and threatened species. The trail has been rerouted over New Hampshire's Presidential Range so the Appalachian Mountain Club can protect certain plant life. The alpine cutoff in the Whites is generally between 4,200 and 4,800 feet (1,300 and 1,500 m). Mountains traversed by the A.T. above treeline include Mount Moosilauke, several miles along the Franconia Range and along the Presidential Range. In the Presidentials, the trail climbs as high as 6,288 feet (1,917 m) on Mount Washington and spends about 13 miles (21 km) continuously above treeline, in the largest alpine environment in the United States east of the Rocky Mountains.

The segments of the trail through Pennsylvania are so rocky that hikers call the region "Rocksylvania". The rocks are abundant and jagged and are the result of erosion that has worn away the dirt along the trails. Hikers find the trail to be tough on feet and ankles and damaging to shoes.

In Maine, the trail extends into even harsher environments, and subalpine and alpine growth descends to lower elevations. Alpine growth in the state ranges from around 2,500 feet (760 m) in the Mahoosuc Range to below 1,000 feet (300 m) in parts of the Hundred-Mile Wilderness, where nearly every area higher than 1,000 feet (300 m) is evergreen forest. These forests include more species of evergreen, as well. In addition to the white pine, spruce, and hemlock prevalent farther south, Maine has many cedar trees along the trail. Near the northern terminus, there are even some tamarack (larch), a coniferous, pine-needled deciduous tree, which provides displays of yellow in the late fall after the birches and maples have gone bare. The hemlocks in Maine are also notable, as the woolly adelgid, which has ravaged populations farther south, has not come into the state yet, and may be unable to make it so far north due to the cold climate.

Maine also has several alpine regions. In addition to several areas of the Mahoosuc Range, the Baldpates, and Old Blue in southern Maine have alpine characteristics despite elevations below 4,000 feet (1,200 m). Saddleback Mountain and Mount Bigelow, farther north, extend only a bit above 4,000 feet (1,200 m), but each has long alpine areas, with no tree growth on the summit and unobstructed views on clear days. From Mount Bigelow, the trail extends for 150 miles (240 km) with only a small area of alpine growth around 3,500 feet (1,100 m) on the summit of White Cap Mountain.

Mount Katahdin, the second-largest alpine environment in the eastern United States, has several square miles of alpine area on the flat "table land" summit as well as the cliffs and aretes leading up to it. Treeline on Mount Katahdin is only around 3,500 feet (1,100 m). This elevation in Massachusetts would barely be a subalpine region, and, south of Virginia, consists of lowland forest. This illustrates the drastic change in climate over 2,000 miles (3,200 km).

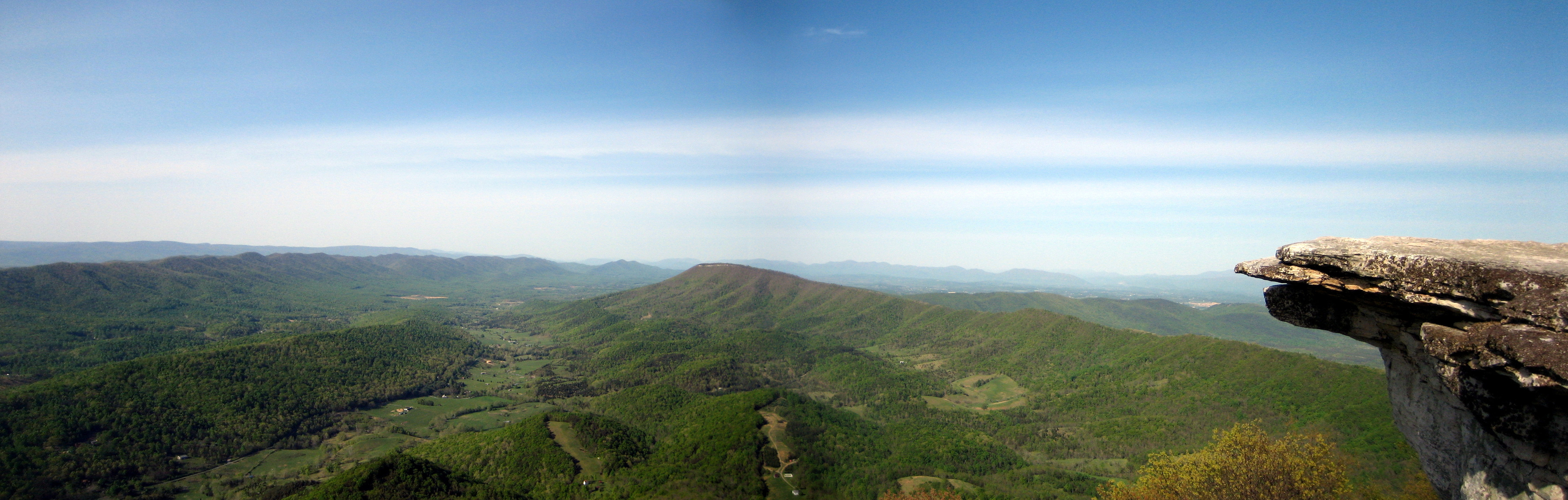
Panoramic image of the Catawba Valley from the McAfee Knob overlook

== Hiking the trail ==
Bicycles are prohibited from most of the trail, except for the sections that follow the Chesapeake and Ohio Canal (C&O Canal) in Maryland and the Virginia Creeper Trail in Virginia. Horses and pack animals are prohibited except horses on the C&O Canal and in the Great Smoky Mountains National Park. Several short segments of the trail, in towns and scenic natural areas, were built to ADA accessibly standards for wheelchair use.

=== Navigation ===
Throughout its length, the AT is marked by white paint blazes that are 2 by 6 inches (5 by 15 cm). Side trails to shelters, viewpoints and parking areas use similarly shaped blue blazes. In past years, some sections of the trail also used metal diamond markers with the AT logo.

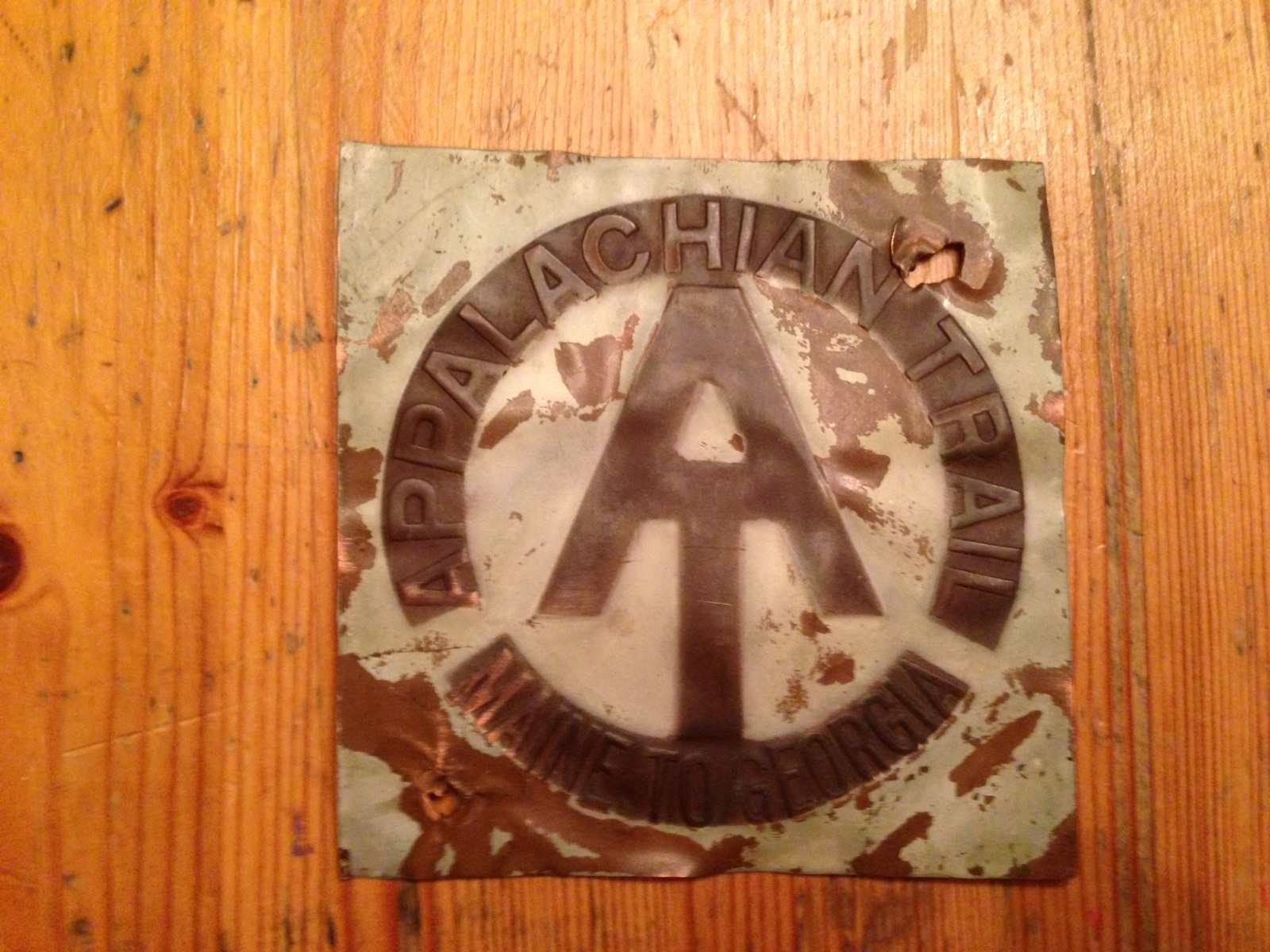
Original 1930 ATC copper marker from a tree in New Jersey

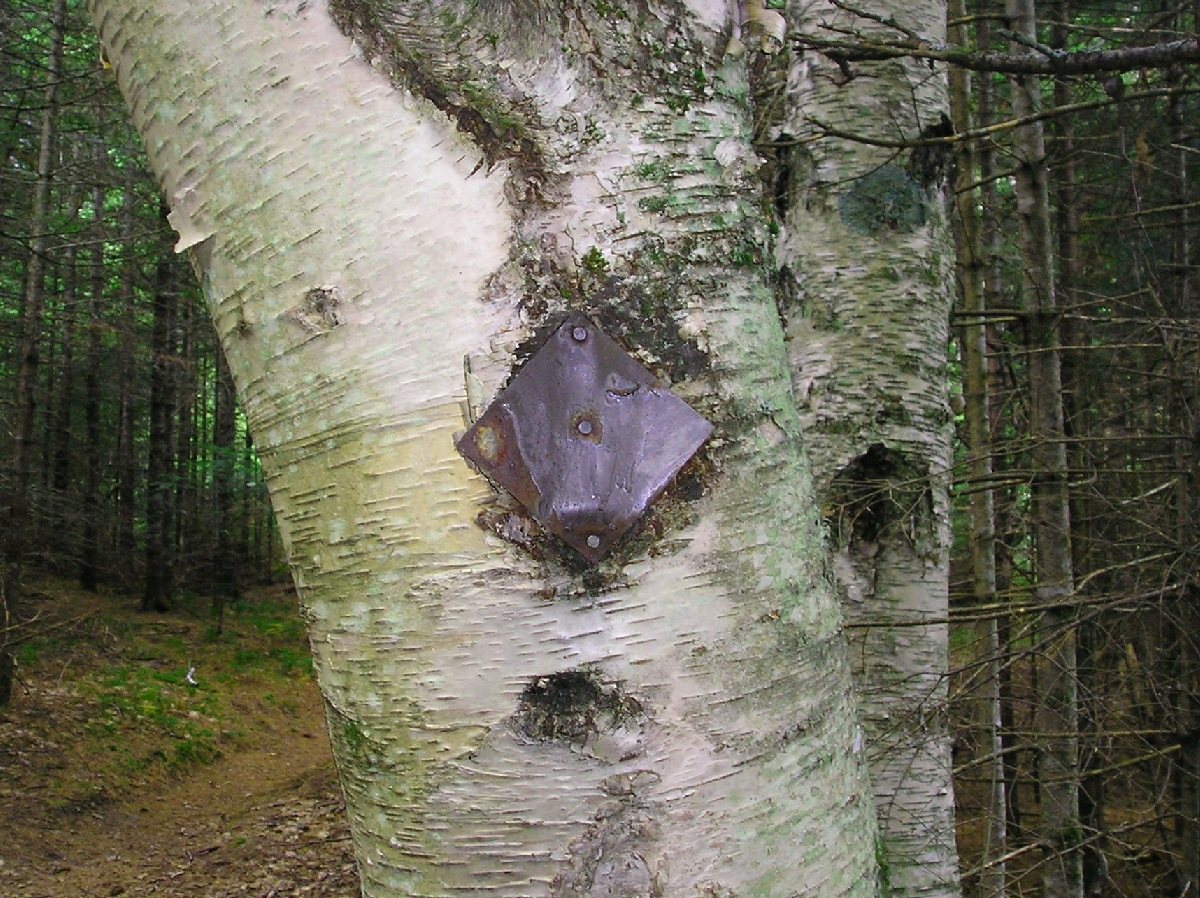
An old metal diamond marker beside the trail in Maine

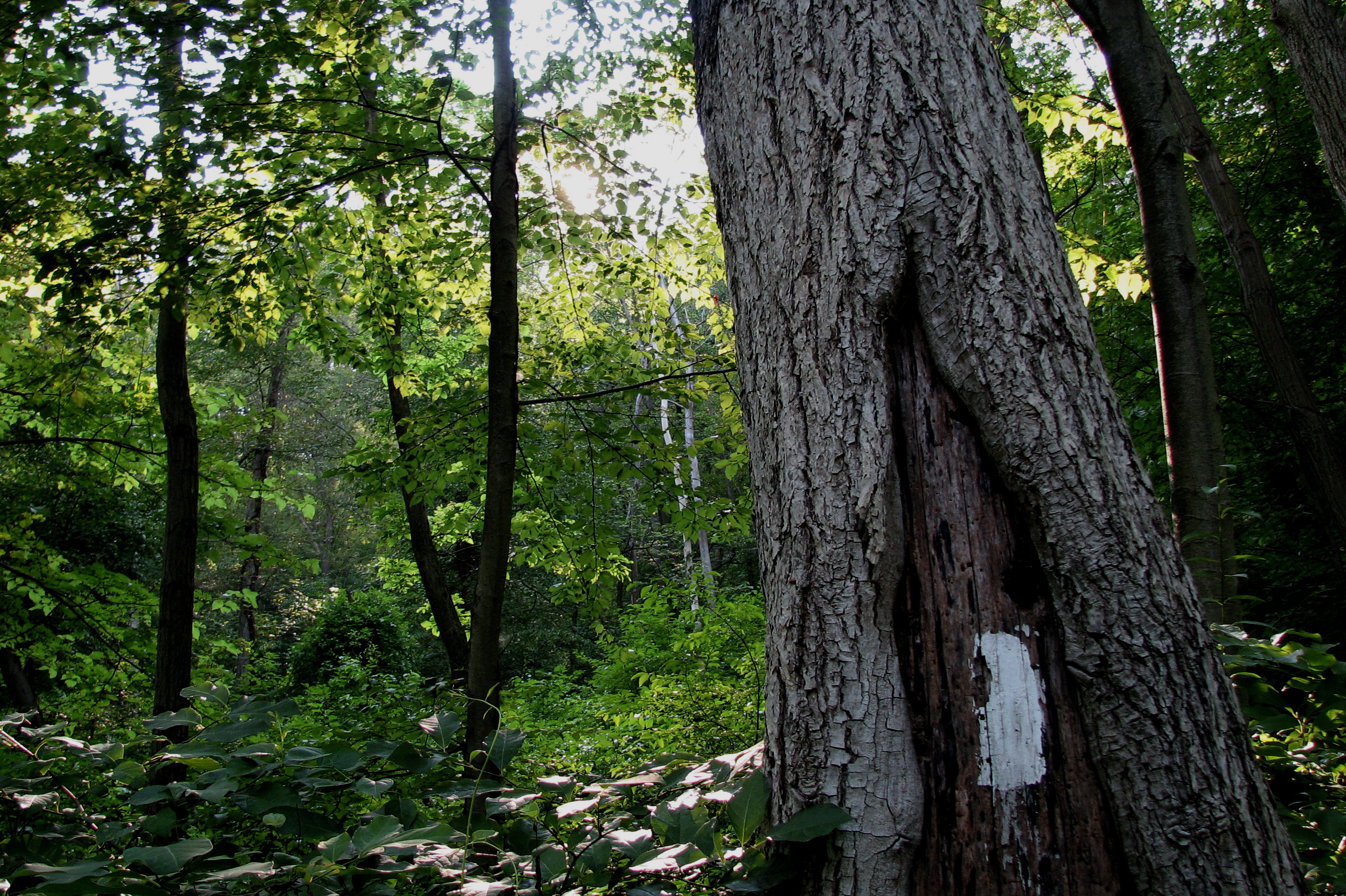
A typical white AT blaze along the trail in Pennsylvania

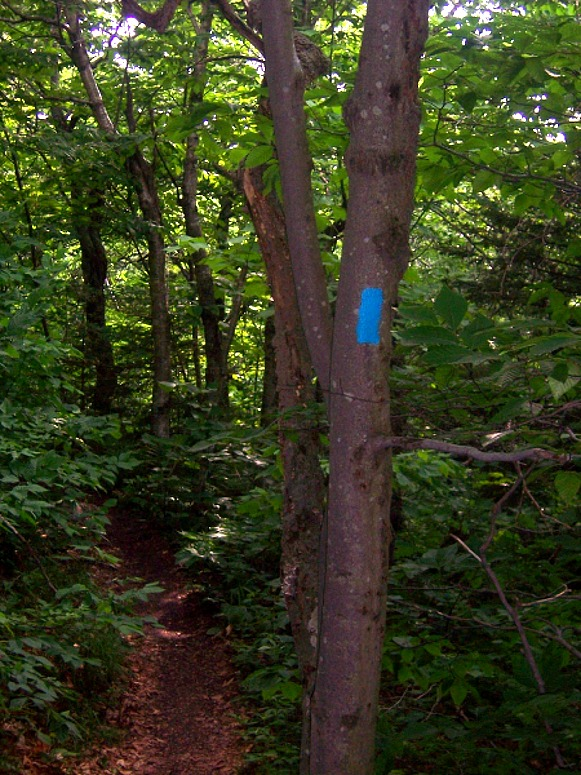
A blue side-trail blaze on Mount Greylock, MA

=== Lodging and camping ===
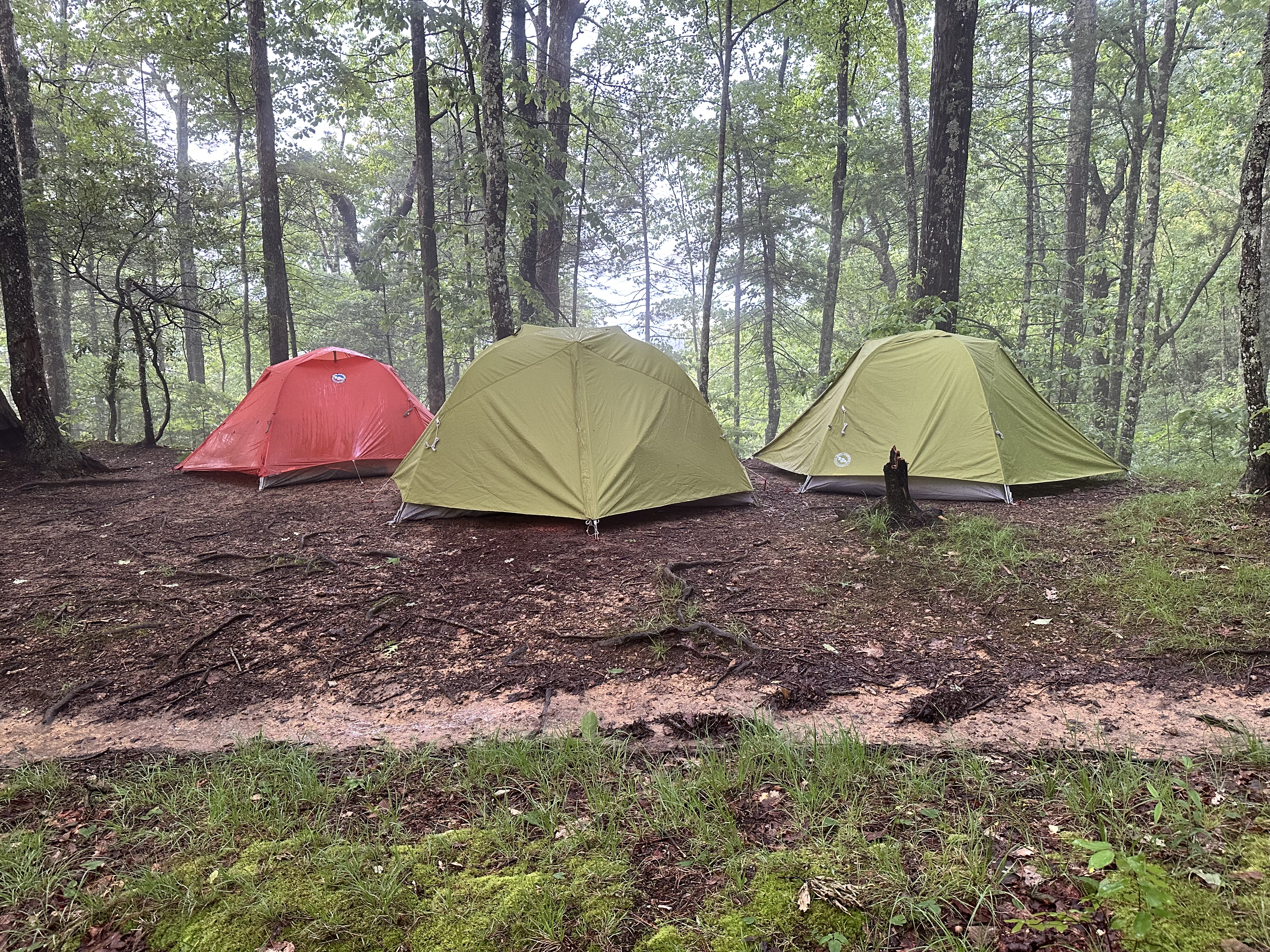
Tents at a campsite alongside the trail near Hot Springs, North Carolina

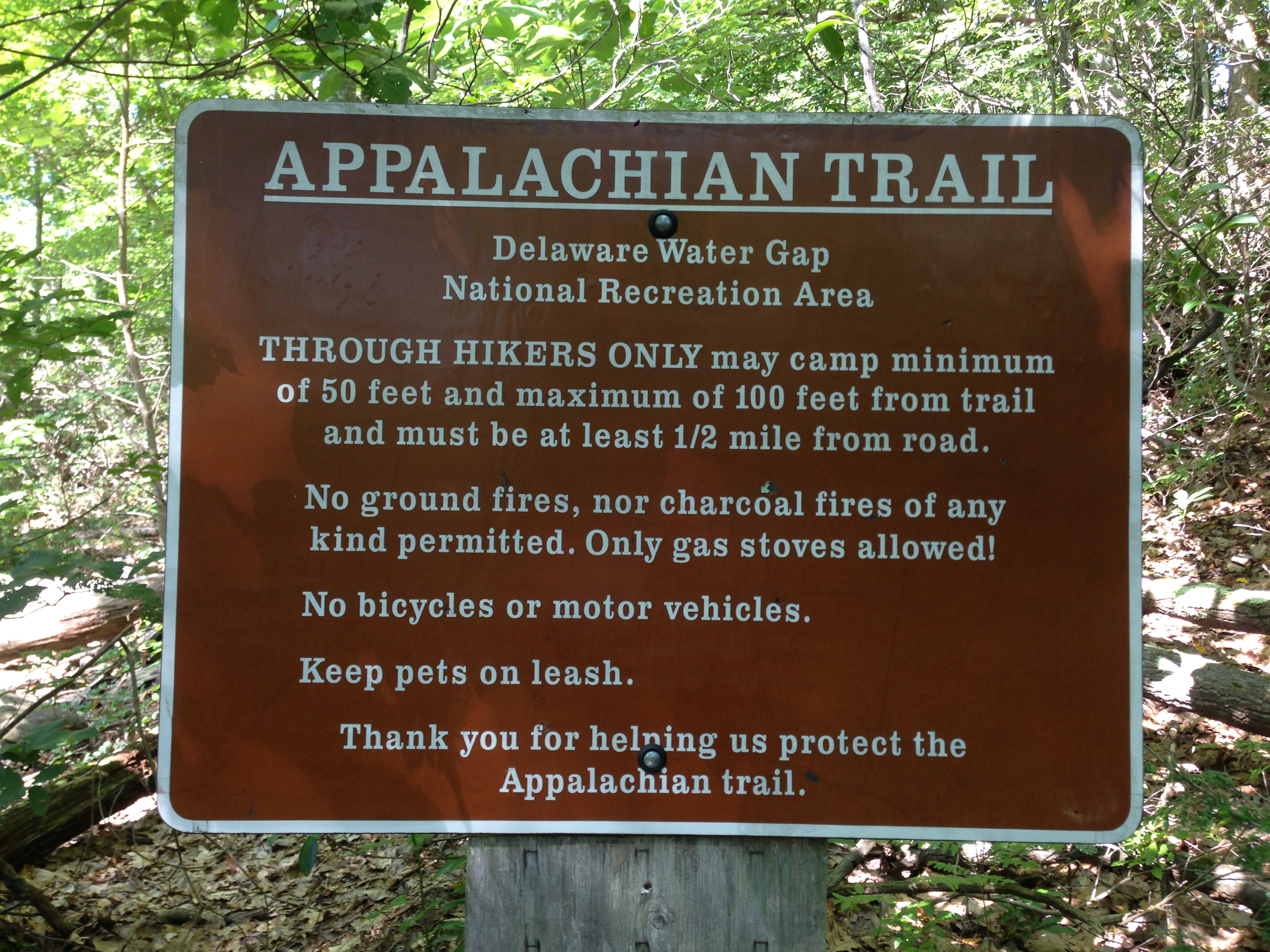
Camping regulations in the Delaware Water Gap National Recreation Area of New Jersey

Most hikers carry a lightweight tent, tent hammock or tarp. The trail has more than 250 shelters and campsites available for hikers. The shelters, sometimes called lean-tos (in Maine, Massachusetts, and Connecticut), huts (in Shenandoah National Park), or Adirondack shelters, are generally open, three-walled structures with a wooden floor, although some shelters are much more complex in structure. Shelters are usually spaced a day's hike or less apart, most often near a water source (which may be dry) and with a privy. They generally have spaces for tent sites in the vicinity as the shelters may be full. The Appalachian Mountain Club (AMC) operates a system of eight huts along 56 miles (90 km) of New Hampshire's White Mountains. These huts are significantly larger than standard trail shelters and offer full-service lodging and meals during the summer months. The Fontana Dam Shelter in North Carolina is more commonly referred to as the Fontana Hilton because of amenities (e.g. flushable toilets) and its proximity to an all-you-can-eat buffet and post office. Several AMC huts have an extended self-service season during the fall, with two extending self-service seasons through the winter and spring. The Potomac Appalachian Trail Club maintains trail cabins, shelters, and huts throughout the Shenandoah region of Virginia.

Shelters are generally maintained by local volunteers. Almost all shelters have one or more pre-hung food hangers (generally consisting of a short nylon cord with an upside-down tuna can suspended halfway down its length) where hikers can hang their food bags to keep them out of the reach of rodents. In hiker lingo, these are sometimes called "mouse trapezes".

Most shelters also contain "unofficial registries", which are known as shelter logs. These logs usually come in the form spiral-bound notebooks that are kept in containers in shelters all along the trail, and signing in them is not required. These logs give hikers a way to leave day-to-day messages while they are on the trail to document where they have been, where they are going, and who/what they have seen. The logs provide a space for informal writing and can also be used to keep track of people on the trail. Most of all, they provide a system of communication for a network of hikers along the trail.

Shelter logs—entries written in log books at certain shelters—can provide proof of who summits certain mountains and can warn about dangerous animals or unfriendly people in the area. Hikers may cite when a certain water source is dried up, providing crucial information to other hikers.

In addition to official shelters, many people offer their homes, places of business, or inns to accommodate AT hikers. One example is the Little Lyford Pond camps maintained by the Appalachian Mountain Club. Inns are more common in sections of the trail that coincide with national parks, most notably Virginia's Shenandoah National Park.

=== Trail communities ===
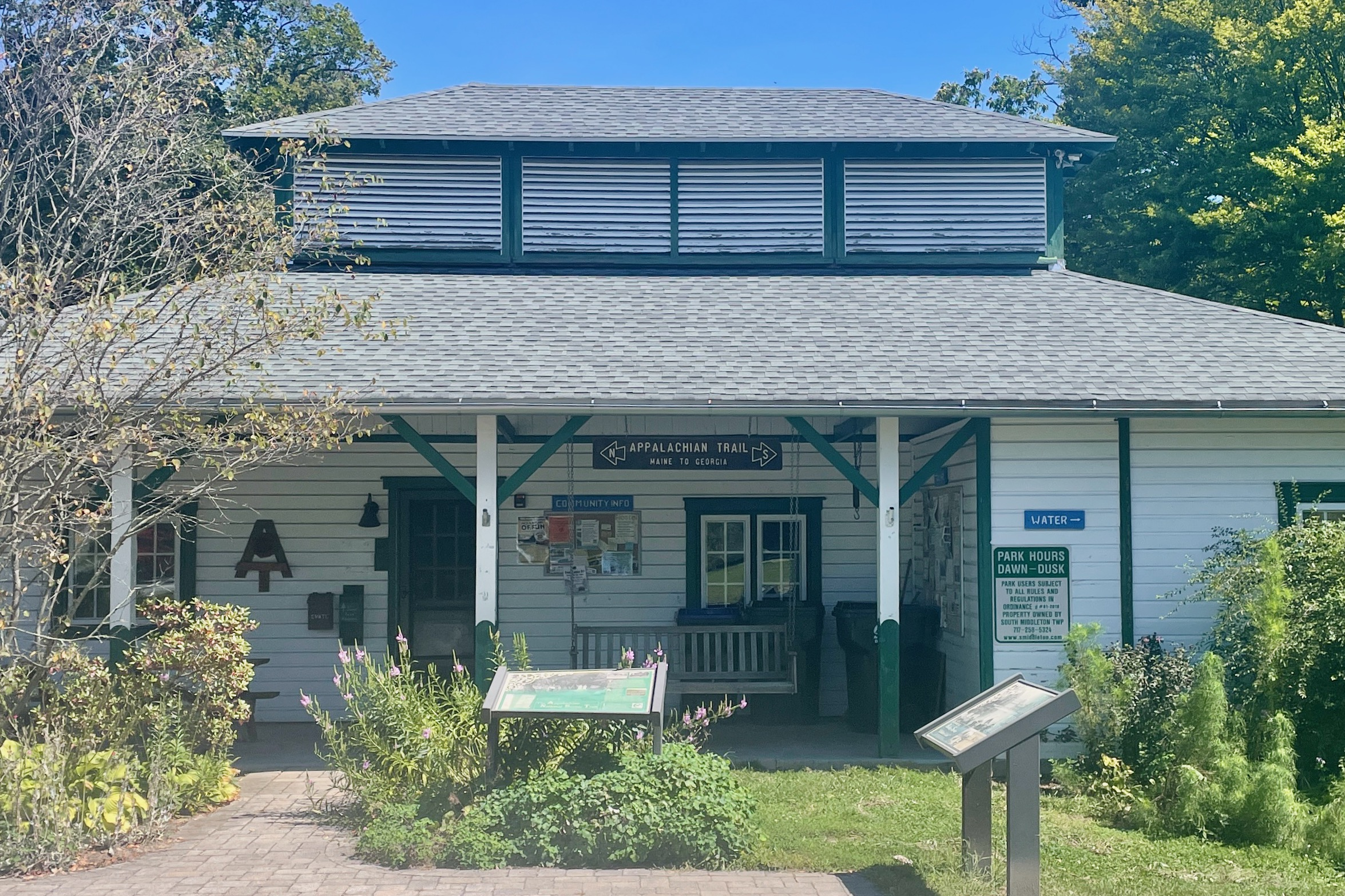
ATC visitor center in Boiling Springs, Pennsylvania

The trail crosses many roads, providing opportunity for hikers to hitchhike into town for food and other supplies. The Appalachian Trail Conservancy lists over 50 communities that have qualified as part of the organization's "A.T. Community" program, having become recognized for providing food, supplies and accommodations for passers-through. In the areas of the trail closer to trail towns, many hikers have experienced what is sometimes called "trail magic", or assistance from strangers through kind actions, gifts, and other forms of encouragement. Trail magic is sometimes done anonymously. In other instances, persons have provided food and cooked for hikers at a campsite.

=== Hazards ===
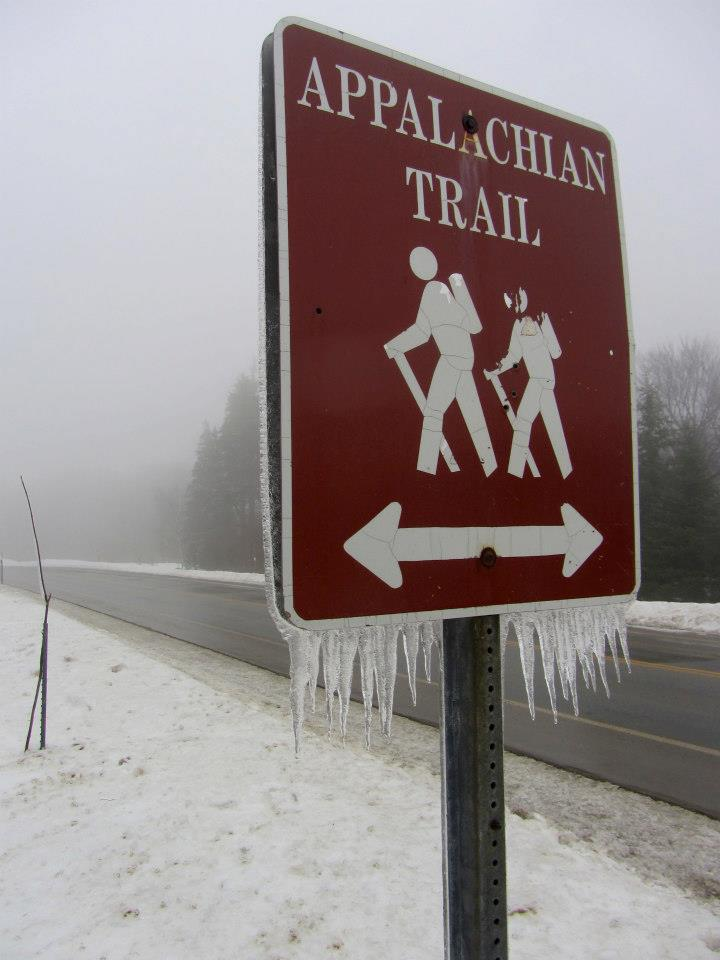
AT crossing sign on New Hampshire State Route 112

The Appalachian Trail is relatively safe. Most injuries or incidents are consistent with comparable outdoor activities. Most hazards are related to weather conditions, human error, plants, animals, diseases, and hostile humans encountered along the trail.

Many animals live around the trail, with bears, snakes, and wild boars posing the greatest threat to human safety. Several rodent- and bug-borne illnesses are also a potential hazard. In scattered instances, foxes, raccoons, and other small animals may bite hikers, posing risk of rabies and other diseases. There has been one reported case (in 1993) of hantavirus pulmonary syndrome (HPS), a rare but dangerous rodent-borne disease affecting the lungs. The affected hiker recovered and hiked the trail the following year. The section of the trail that runs through the Mid-Atlantic and New England states has a very high population of deer ticks carrying Lyme and other tick-borne diseases, and corresponds to the highest density of reported Lyme disease in the country.

The weather is a major consideration for hikers. Hiking season of the trail generally starts in mid-to-late spring, when conditions are much more favorable in the South. However, this time may also be characterized by extreme heat, sometimes in excess of 100 °F (38 °C). Farther north and at higher elevations, the weather can be characterized by low temperatures, strong winds, hail or snow storms and reduced visibility. Prolonged rain, though not typically life-threatening, can undermine stamina and ruin supplies. In March 2015, a hiker was killed on the trail in Maryland when a large tree blew over and fell onto him.

Violent crime is rare but has occurred in a few instances. The first reported homicide on the trail was in 1974 in Georgia. In 1981, the issue of violence on the Appalachian Trail received national attention when Robert Mountford, Jr. and Laura Susan Ramsay, both social workers in Ellsworth, Maine, were murdered by Randall Lee Smith. In 1990, Molly LaRue and Geoff Hood were murdered by Paul David Crews in a trail overnight shelter on Cove Mountain in Pennsylvania. Another homicide occurred in May 1996, when two women were abducted, bound and murdered near the trail in Shenandoah National Park. The primary suspect was later discovered harassing a female cyclist in the vicinity, but charges against him were dropped and the case remained unsolved until 2024.

In May 2019, Oklahoman Ronald S. Sanchez Jr., 43 years old, was murdered at a campsite near Mount Rogers National Recreation Area in western Virginia Jefferson National Forest. A female hiker who has not been identified was also injured by an assailant there. James L. Jordan, 30, of West Yarmouth, Massachusetts was found not guilty of the crimes by reason of insanity.

Human error can lead to casualties as well. In July 2013, 66-year-old lone hiker Geraldine Largay disappeared on the trail in Maine. Largay became lost and survived 26 days before dying. Her remains were found two years later in October 2015. In October 2015, a hiker visiting from England was killed on the trail by falling while taking photos at the Annapolis Rocks overlook in Maryland.

The 2020 COVID-19 pandemic prompted the Appalachian Trail Conservancy to discourage use of the trail and the National Park Service to close all AT-managed hiking shelters from Virginia to Maine. The withdrawal of volunteers and trail-maintenance crews left the trail unprepared for the influx of users escaping home isolation. In 2021, the conservancy suspended issuing hang tags for through-hikers for a period during the continuing pandemic.

=== Trail completion ===
Trail hikers who attempt to complete the entire trail in a single season are called "thru-hikers"; those who traverse the trail during a series of separate trips are known as "section-hikers". Rugged terrain, weather extremes, illness, injury, and the time and effort required make thru-hiking difficult to accomplish. As of 2017, the Appalachian Trail Conservancy estimated that 3,839 hikers set out from Springer Mountain, northbound, 497 from Mount Katahdin, southbound, and reported 1,186 completions of hiking the entire trail, which includes those by both section and through hikers.

Most thru-hikers walk northward from Georgia to Maine, and generally start out in early spring and follow the warm weather as it moves north. These "north-bounders" are also called NOBO (North-bound) or GAME (Georgia-to-Maine), while those heading in the opposite direction are termed "south-bounders" (also SOBO or MEGA).

A thru-hike generally requires five to seven months, although some have done it in three months, and several trail runners have completed the trail in less time. Trail runners typically tackle the AT with automobile support teams, without backpacks, and without camping in the woods.

Thru-hikers are classified into many informal groups. "Purists" are hikers who stick to the official AT trail, follow the white blazes, except for side trips to shelters and camp sites. "Blue Blazers" cut miles from the full route by taking side trails marked by blue blazes. The generally pejorative name "Yellow Blazers", a reference to yellow road stripes, is given to those who hitchhike to move either down or up the trail.

Part of hiker subculture includes making colorful entries in logbooks at trail shelters, signed using pseudonyms called "trail names".

The Appalachian Trail Conservancy gives the name "2000 Miler" to anyone who completes the entire trail. The ATC's recognition policy for "2000 Milers" gives equal recognition to thru-hikers and section-hikers, operates on the honor system, and recognizes blue-blazed trails or officially required roadwalks as substitutes for the official, white-blazed route during an emergency such as a flood, forest fire, or impending storm on an exposed, high-elevation stretch. As of 2018, more than 19,000 people had reported completing the entire trail. The northbound completion rate of hiking the trail in twelve months or fewer varied from 19% to 27% from 2011 to 2018. The southbound completion rate varied between 27% and 30% during the same period.

The Appalachian Trail, the Continental Divide Trail, and the Pacific Crest Trail form what is known as the Triple Crown of long-distance hiking in the United States. In 2001, Brian Robinson became the first one to complete all three trails in a year. In 2018, Heather Anderson (trail name "Anish") became the first woman to complete the three Triple Crown trails in a calendar year.

=== Speed records ===
Fastest known times for self-supported attempts (meaning no vehicle or crew support, like a traditional through-hiker):

- Jeff "Legend" Garmire completed the trail southbound on September 21, 2025 in 45 days, 8 hours and 37 minutes.
- Heather "Anish" Anderson completed the trail southbound on September 24, 2015, in 54 days, 7 hours, and 48 minutes.

Fastest known times for supported attempts (the athletes travel light, relying on a support crew with food, shelter, medical treatment, etc.):

- Tara Dower completed the trail southbound on September 21, 2024 in 40 days, 18 hours, and 5 minutes.
- Karel Sabbe completed the trail northbound on August 29, 2018, in 41 days, 7 hours, and 39 minutes.

=== Age records ===
Dale Sanders, known by his trail name "Grey Beard", first set the oldest hiker record in 2017 at age 82. On November 8, 2021, M.J. "Nimblewill Nomad" Eberheart broke that record, becoming the oldest person to hike the entire Appalachian Trail at age 83.

On August 31, 2026, Sanders, at age 91, reclaimed the record as the oldest person to complete the Appalachian Trail. He began his thru-hike on September 6, 2025, in West Virginia, and finished at the summit of Mount Katahdin in Maine.

On October 13, 2020, Juniper Netteburg is believed to be the youngest person to hike the entire Appalachian Trail under her own power at age 4.

== Route ==
The trail is protected along more than 99% of its course by federal or state ownership of the land or by right-of-way. The trail is maintained by a variety of organizations, environmental advocacy groups, governmental agencies and individuals. Annually, more than 4,000 volunteers contribute over 175,000 hours of effort on the Appalachian Trail, an effort coordinated largely by the Appalachian Trail Conservancy (ATC) organization. The AT passes through eight national forests and two national parks.

In the course of its journey, the trail follows the ridge line of the Appalachian Mountains, crossing many of its highest peaks and running through wilderness with only a few exceptions. The trail once traversed many hundreds of miles of private property, but today 99% of the trail is on public land.

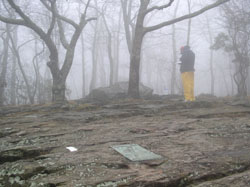
A hiker signs the register on Springer Mountain, GA, southern terminus of the trail.

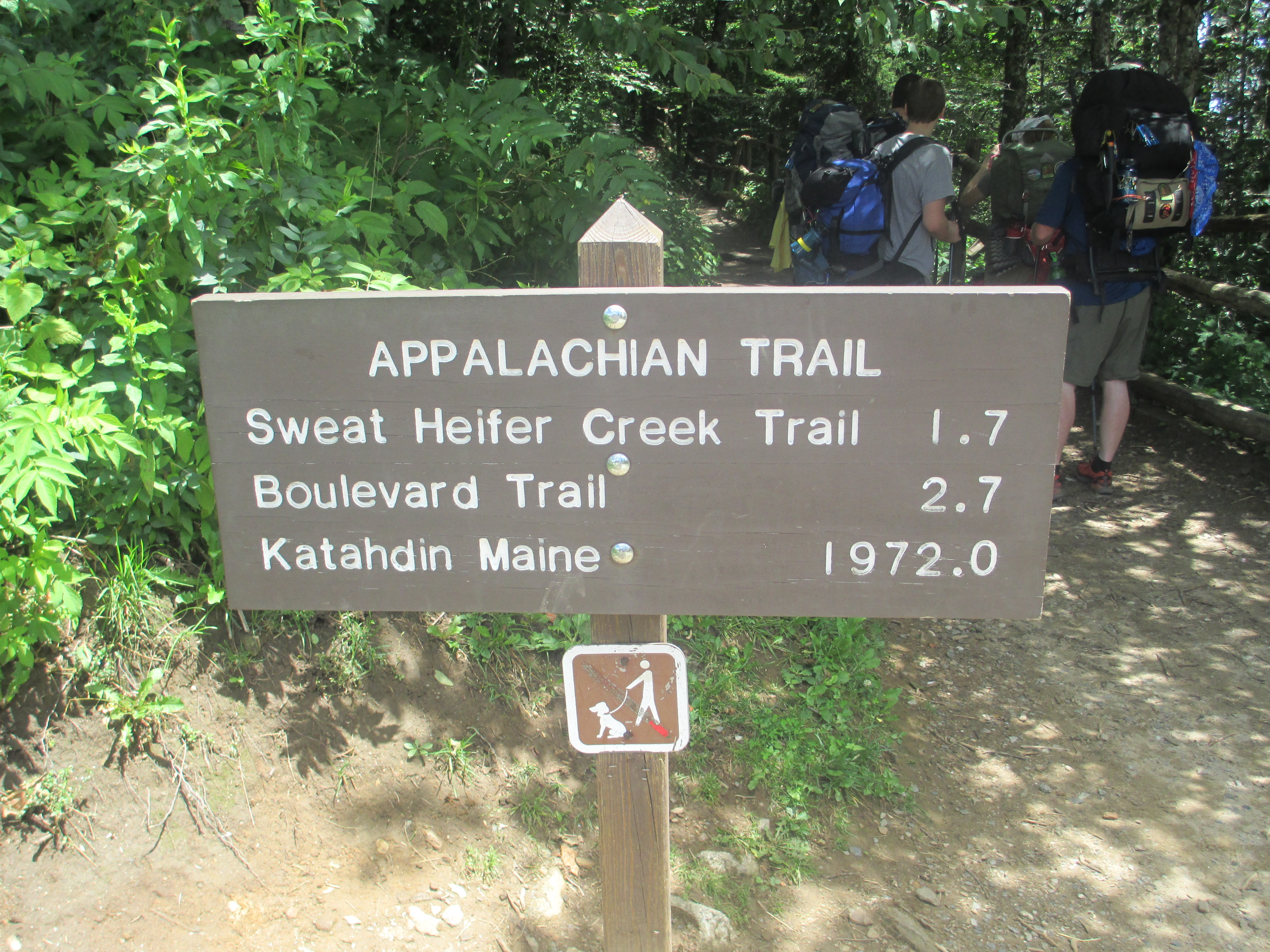
The Appalachian Trail at Newfound Gap in the Great Smoky Mountains National Park, NC

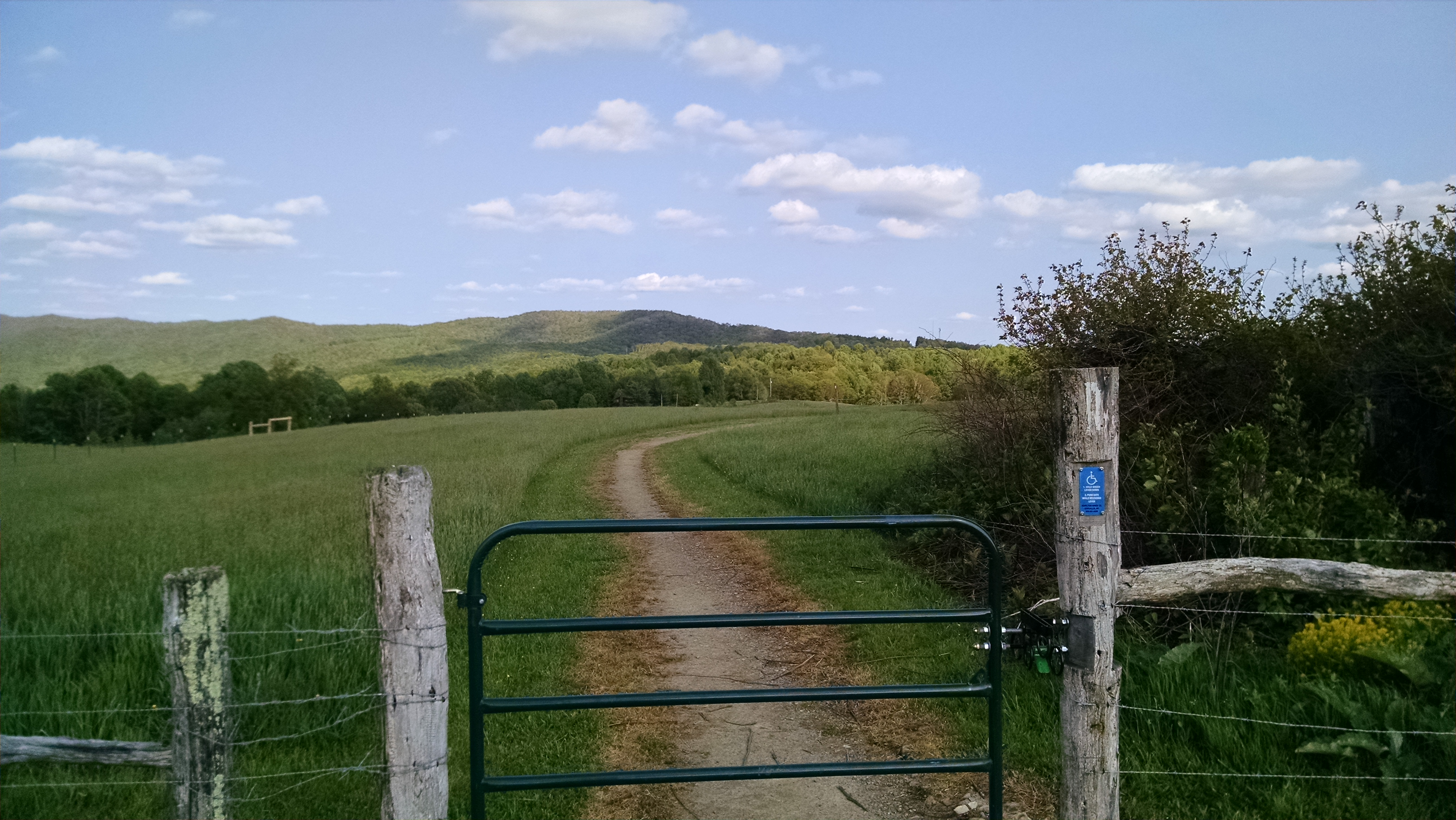
A wheelchair accessible portion of the trail on Cross Mountain, near Shady Valley, Tennessee

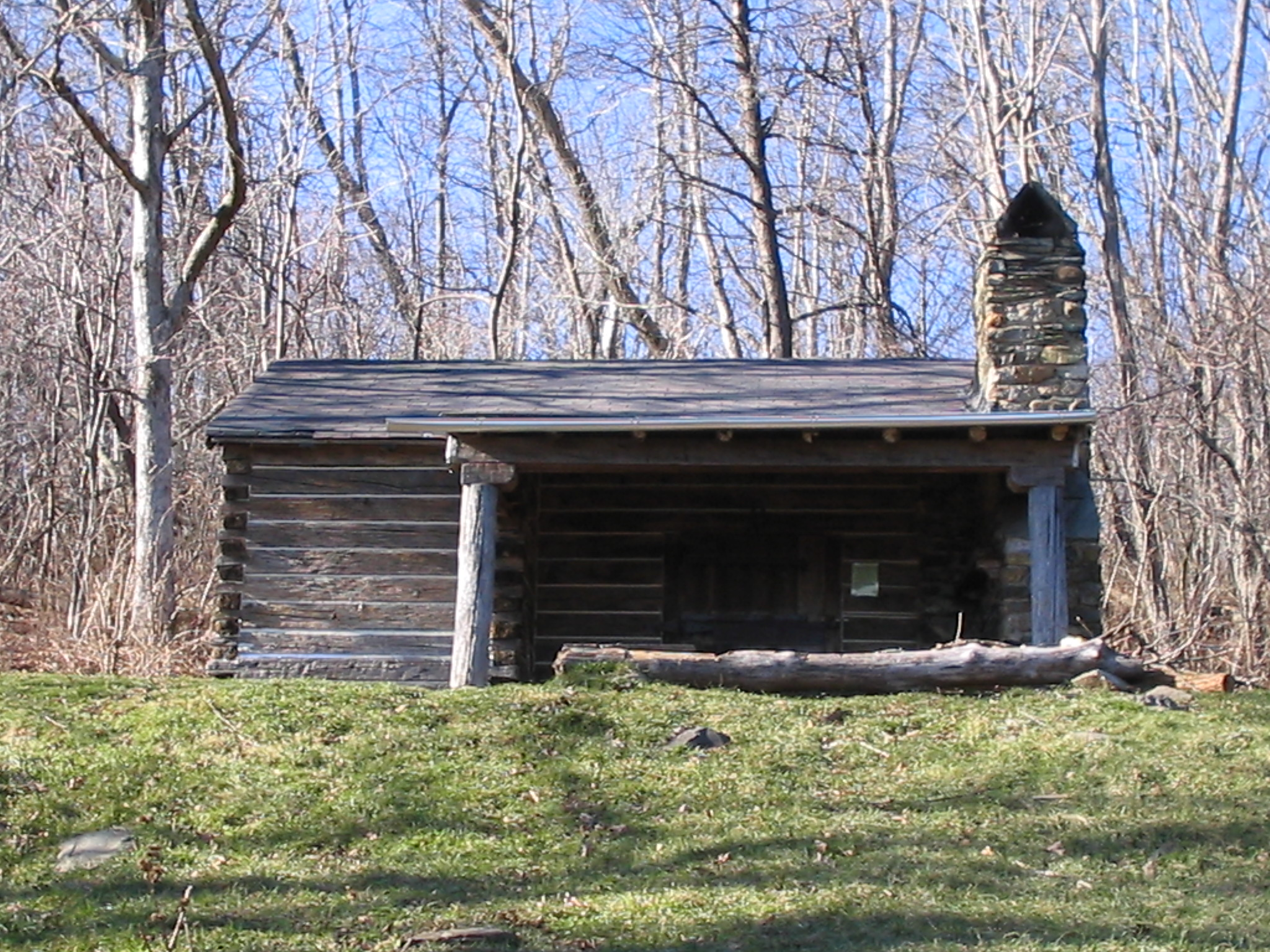
The Pocosin cabin along the trail in Shenandoah National Park, Virginia

=== Georgia ===
Georgia has 75 miles (121 km) of the trail, including the southern terminus at Springer Mountain at an elevation of 3,782 feet (1,153 m). At 4,461 ft (1,360 m), Blood Mountain is the highest point on the trail in Georgia. The AT and approach trail, along with many miles of blue blazed side trails, are managed and maintained by the Georgia Appalachian Trail Club. See also: Georgia Peaks on the Appalachian Trail.

=== North Carolina ===
North Carolina has 95.7 mi (154.0 km) of the trail, not including more than 200 miles (320 km) along the Tennessee state line. Altitude ranges from 1,725 to 5,498 ft (526 to 1,676 m). The trail enters from Georgia at Bly Gap, ascending peaks such as Standing Indian Mountain, Mt. Albert, and Wayah Bald. It then goes by Nantahala Outdoor Center at the Nantahala River Gorge and the Nantahala River crossing. Up to this point, the trail is maintained by the Nantahala Hiking Club. Beyond this point, it is maintained by the Smoky Mountains Hiking Club. 30 mi (48 km) further north, Fontana Dam marks the entrance to Great Smoky Mountains National Park.

=== Tennessee ===
Tennessee has 71 mi (114 km) of the trail, not including more than 200 mi (320 km) along or near the North Carolina state line. The section that runs just below the summit of Kuwohi in Great Smoky Mountains National Park is along the North Carolina and Tennessee state line and is the highest point on the trail at 6,643 ft (2,025 m). The Smoky Mountains Hiking Club (Knoxville, TN) maintains the trail throughout the Great Smoky Mountains National Park to Davenport Gap. North of Davenport Gap, the Carolina Mountain Club (Asheville, NC) maintains the trail to Spivey Gap. The remaining Tennessee section is maintained by the Tennessee Eastman Hiking & Canoeing Club (Kingsport, TN).

=== Virginia ===
Virginia has 550.3 mi (885.6 km) of the trail, one quarter of the entire trail, including more than 20 mi (32 km) along the West Virginia state line. With the climate, and the timing of northbound thru-hikers, this section is wet and challenging because of the spring thaw and heavy spring rainfall. Substantial portions of the trail closely parallel Skyline Drive in Shenandoah National Park and, further south, the Blue Ridge Parkway.

The Appalachian Trail Conservancy considers a well-maintained 104 mi (167 km) section of the trail that the Civilian Conservation Corps constructed in Shenandoah National Park as excellent for beginning hikers. Climbs in this section rarely exceed 1,000 ft (300 m). In the southwestern portion of the state, the trail goes within one half mile of the highest point in Virginia, Mount Rogers, which is a short side-hike from the AT.

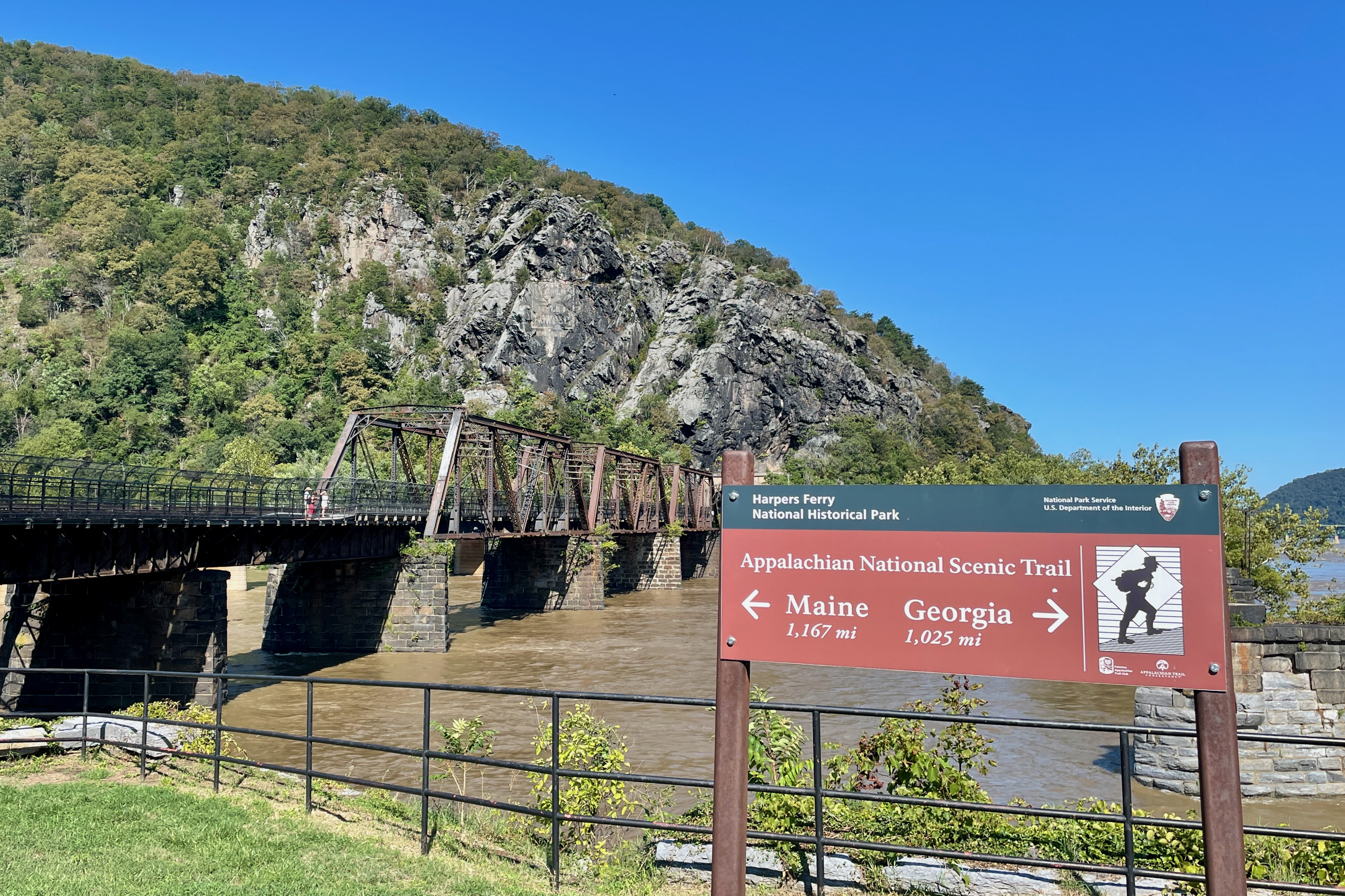
Crossing the Potomac River at Harpers Ferry, West Virginia, "psychological midpoint" of the trail

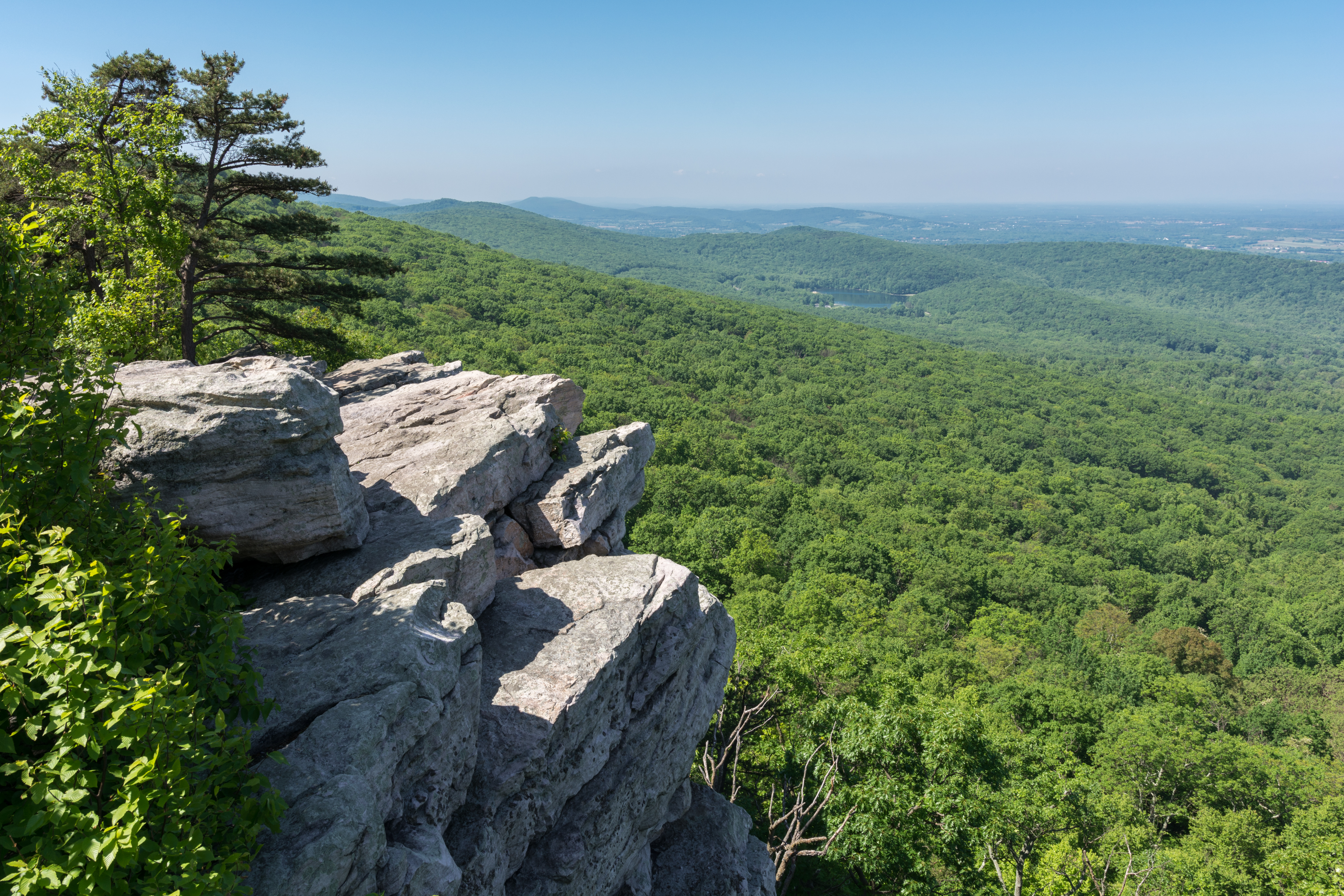
Annapolis Rock Overlook, along the trail in South Mountain State Park, Maryland

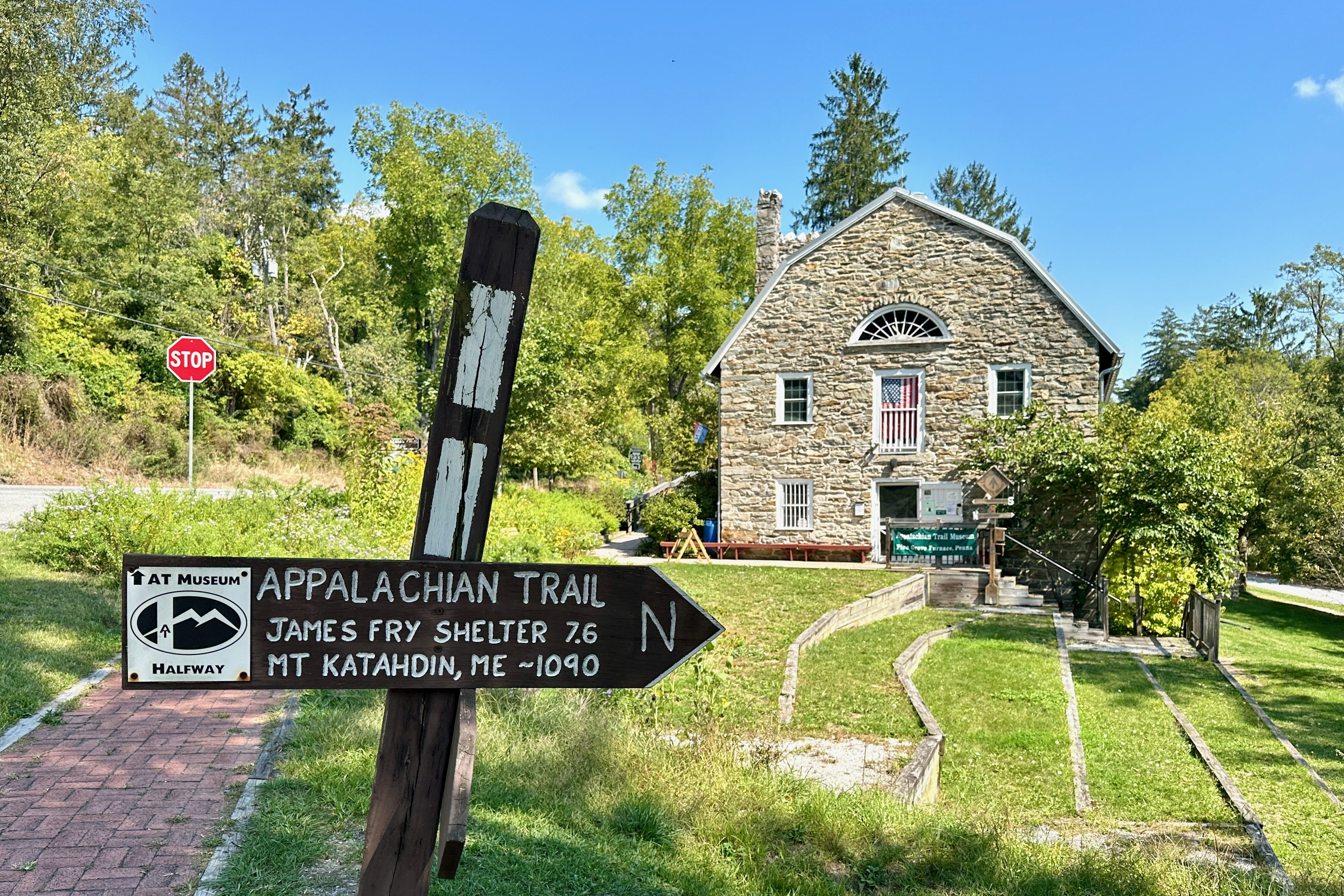
The Appalachian Trail Museum near the midpoint in Pine Grove Furnace State Park, Pennsylvania

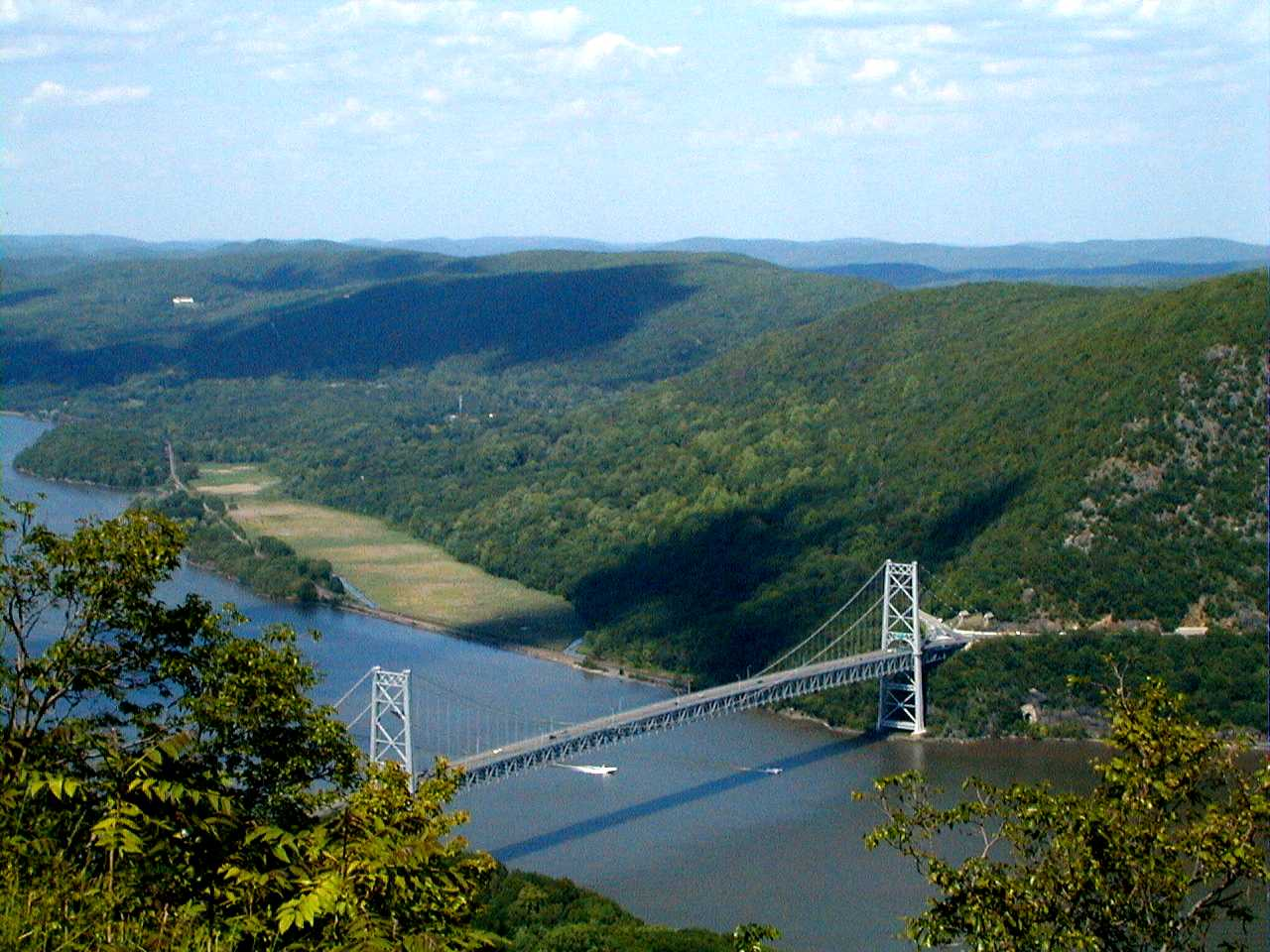
Bear Mountain Bridge, New York

=== West Virginia ===
West Virginia has 4 mi (6.4 km) of the trail, not including about 20 mi (32 km) along the Virginia state line. Here the trail passes through the town of Harpers Ferry, headquarters of the Appalachian Trail Conservancy. Harpers Ferry is what many consider to be the "psychological midpoint" of the trail's length. The actual midpoint is about 75 mi (121 km) further north in southern Pennsylvania.

A CSX train derailment in December 2019, damaged the pedestrian footbridge over the Potomac River at Harpers Ferry, severing the trail between West Virginia and Maryland. The foot crossing reopened in July 2020.

=== Maryland ===
Maryland has 41 mi (66 km) of the trail, with elevations ranging from 230 to 1,880 ft (70 to 573 m). Most of the trail runs along the ridgeline of South Mountain in South Mountain State Park. Hikers are required to stay at designated shelters and campsites. The trail runs through the eastern edge of Greenbrier State Park. This can serve as stop point for a hot shower and a visit to the camp store. The trail runs along the C&O Canal Towpath route for 3 miles (4.8 km). Hikers will also pass High Rock, which offers extensive views and is also used as a hang-gliding site. The section ends at Pen Mar Park, which sits on the state line of Maryland and Pennsylvania.

=== Pennsylvania ===
Pennsylvania has 229.6 mi (369.5 km) of the trail. The trail extends from the Pennsylvania-Maryland line at the village of Pen Mar, northeast to the Delaware Water Gap at the Pennsylvania-New Jersey state line. In the south-central region of the state, the trail passes through Pine Grove Furnace State Park, which is often considered the symbolic mid-point of the Appalachian Trail. For much of its length in Pennsylvania, the trail is known for its very rocky terrain, which slows many hikers down while causing injuries and placing strain on equipment. Hikers have dubbed the state "Rocksylvania" and "where boots go to die".

=== New Jersey ===
New Jersey is home to 72.2 mi (116.2 km) of the trail. The trail enters New Jersey from the south on a pedestrian walkway along the Interstate 80 bridge over the Delaware River, ascends from the Delaware Water Gap to the top of Kittatinny Mountain in Worthington State Forest, and passes Sunfish Pond. It continues north through the Delaware Water Gap National Recreation Area and Stokes State Forest and eventually reaches High Point State Park, the highest peak in New Jersey. A side trail is required to reach the actual peak.

It then turns in a southeastern direction along the New York state line for about 30 mi (48 km), passing over long sections of boardwalk bridges over marshy land. It enters Wawayanda State Park and then the Abram S. Hewitt State Forest, just before entering New York near Greenwood Lake. In New Jersey, the New York - New Jersey Trail Conference maintains and updates the Appalachian Trail. Black bear activity along the trail in New Jersey increased rapidly starting in 2001. Hence, metal bear-proof food storage boxes are in place at all New Jersey shelters.

=== New York ===
New York's 88.4 mi (142.3 km) of trail contain very little elevation change compared to other states. From south to north, the trail summits many small mountains under 1,400 ft (430 m) in elevation. Its highest point in New York is Prospect Rock at 1,433 ft (437 m), only 3,000 ft (910 m) from the state line with New Jersey. The trail continues north, climbing near Fitzgerald Falls, passing through Sterling Forest, and then entering Harriman State Park and Bear Mountain State Park.

The lowest point on the entire Appalachian Trail is in the Bear Mountain Zoo at 124 ft (38 m). It crosses the Hudson River on the Bear Mountain Bridge. It then passes through Fahnestock State Park, and continues northeast and crosses the Metro-North Railroad's Harlem Line. This track crossing is the site of the only train station along the trail's length.

It enters Connecticut via the Pawling Nature Reserve. The section of the trail that passes through Harriman and Bear Mountain State Parks is the oldest section of the trail, completed in 1923. A portion of this section was paved by 700 volunteers with 800 granite-slab steps, followed by over a mile of walkway supported by stone crib walls with boulders lining the path. The project took four years, cost roughly $1 million, and opened in June 2010. The project was done by the New York–New Jersey Trail Conference, which maintains and updates the Appalachian Trail in New York.

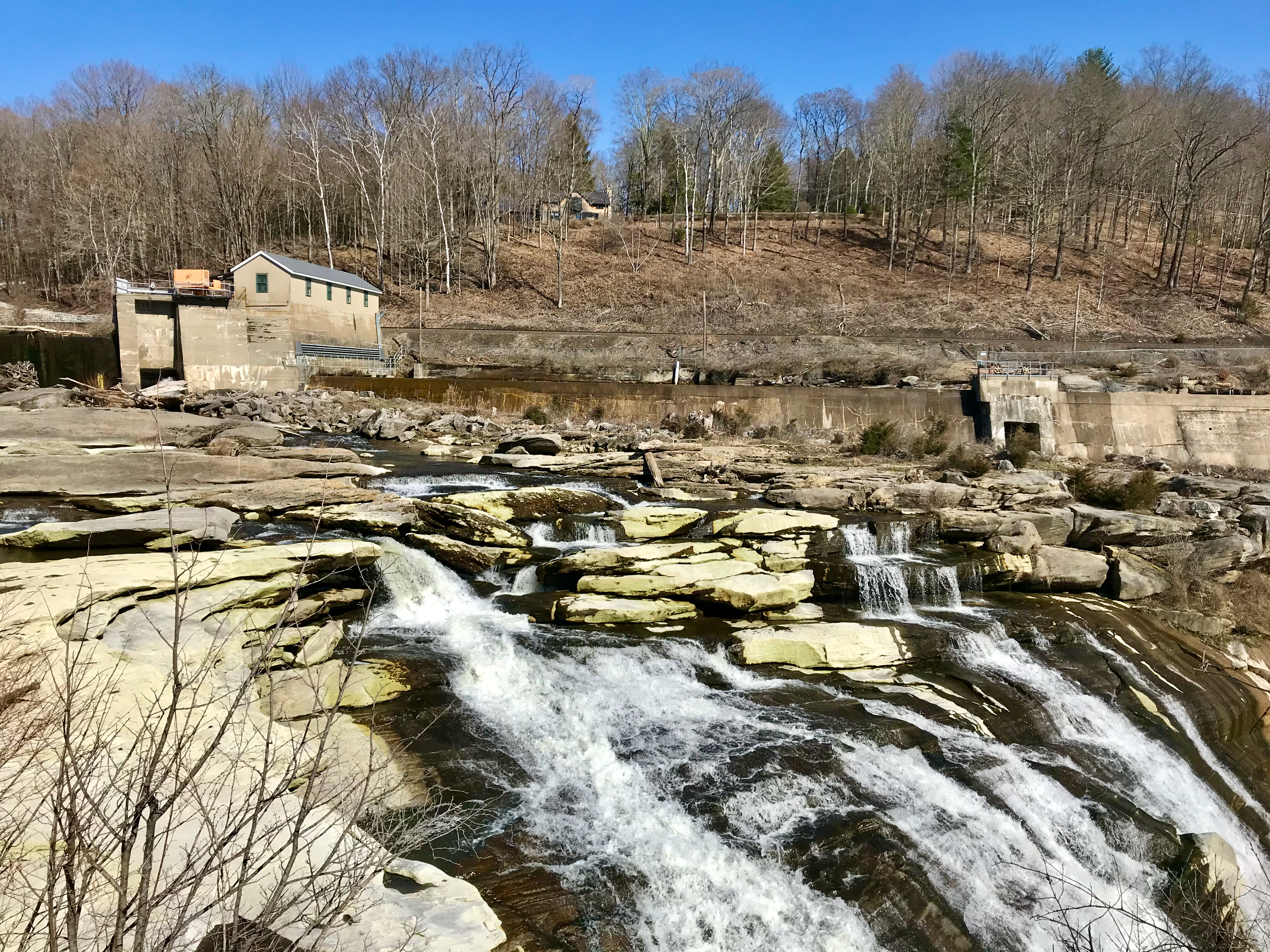
Housatonic River's Great Falls in Falls Village, Connecticut, seen from the Appalachian Trail.

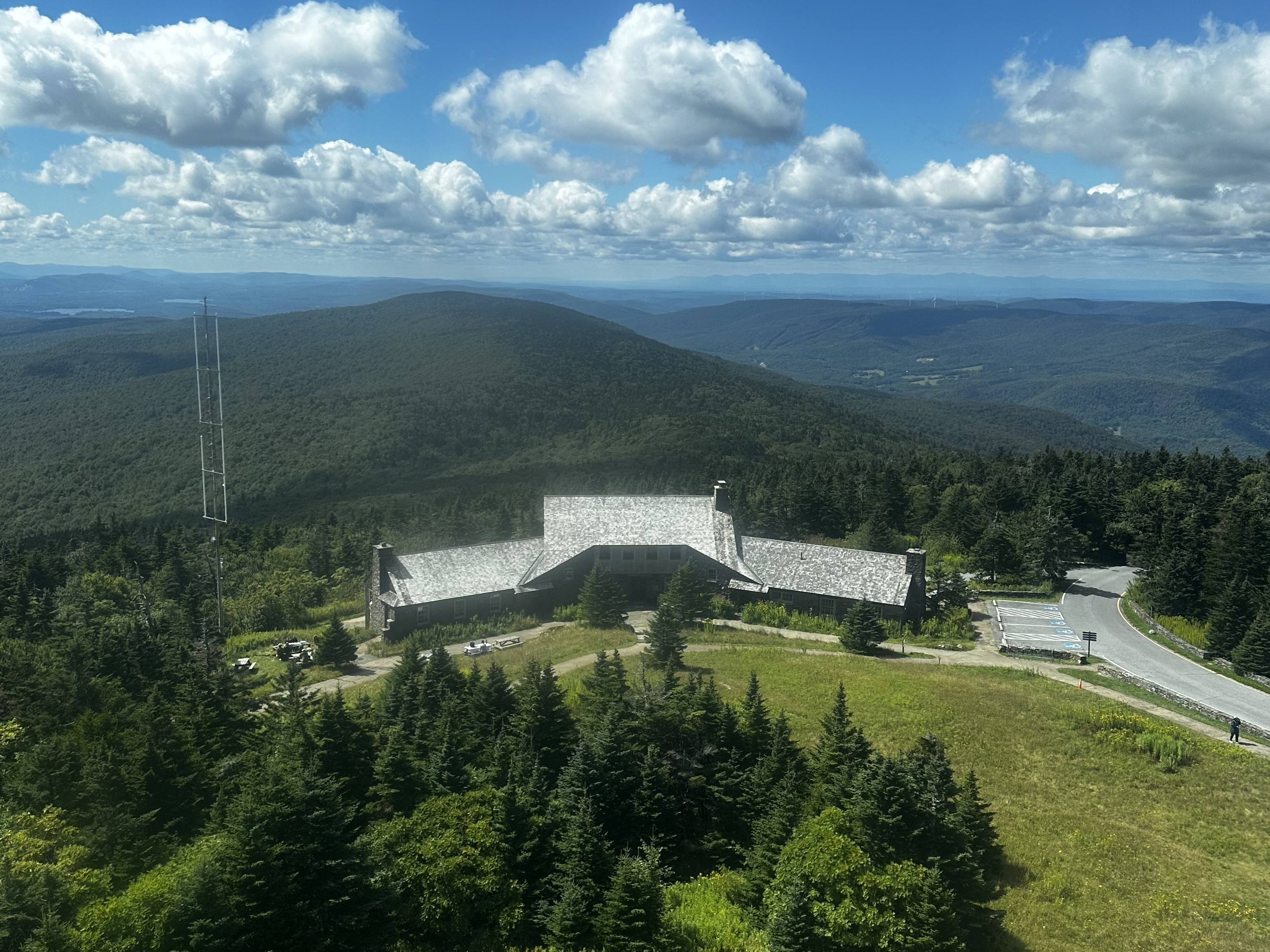
A view from Mount Greylock in Massachusetts

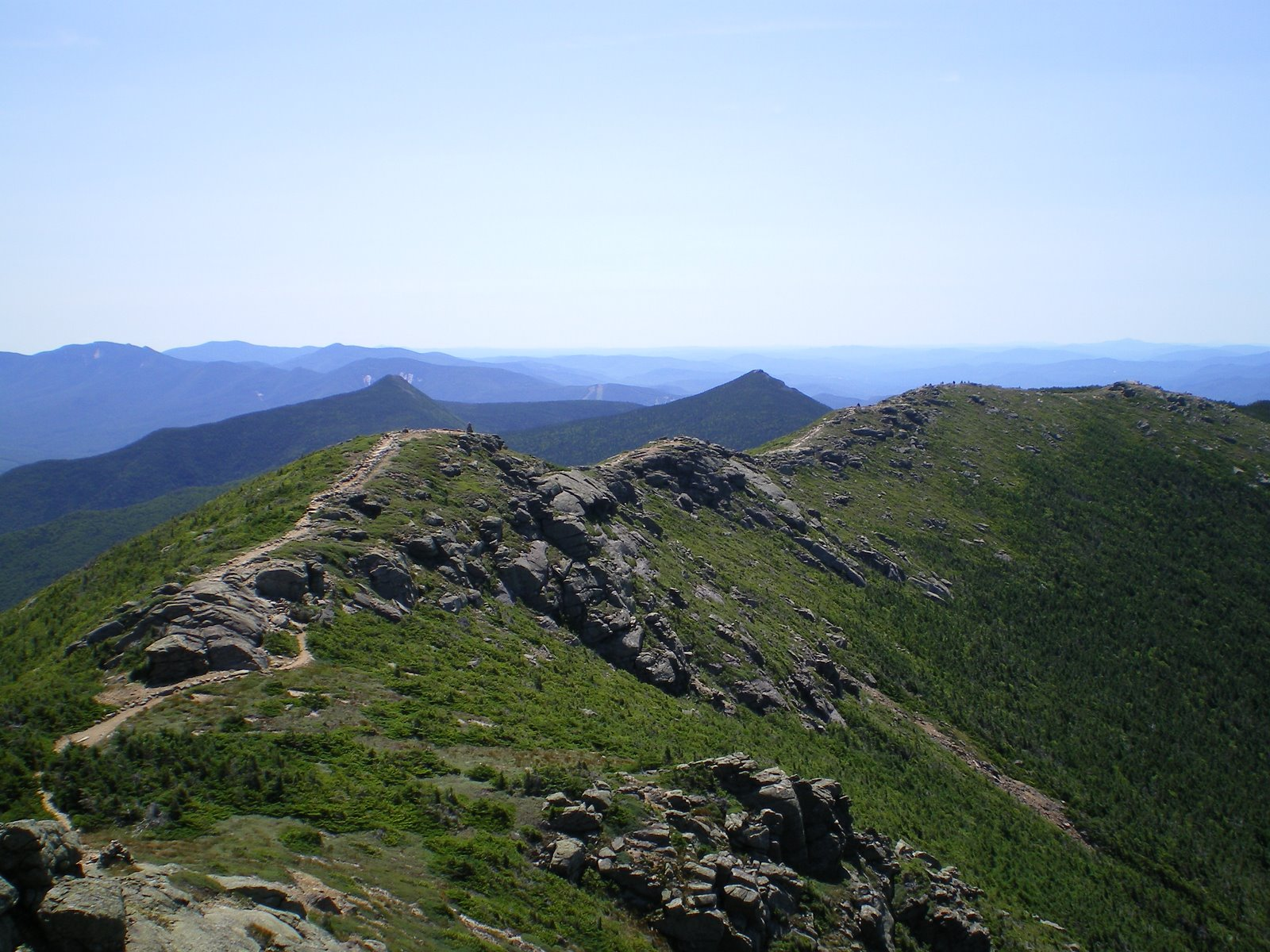
Franconia Ridge, a section of the Appalachian Trail in New Hampshire

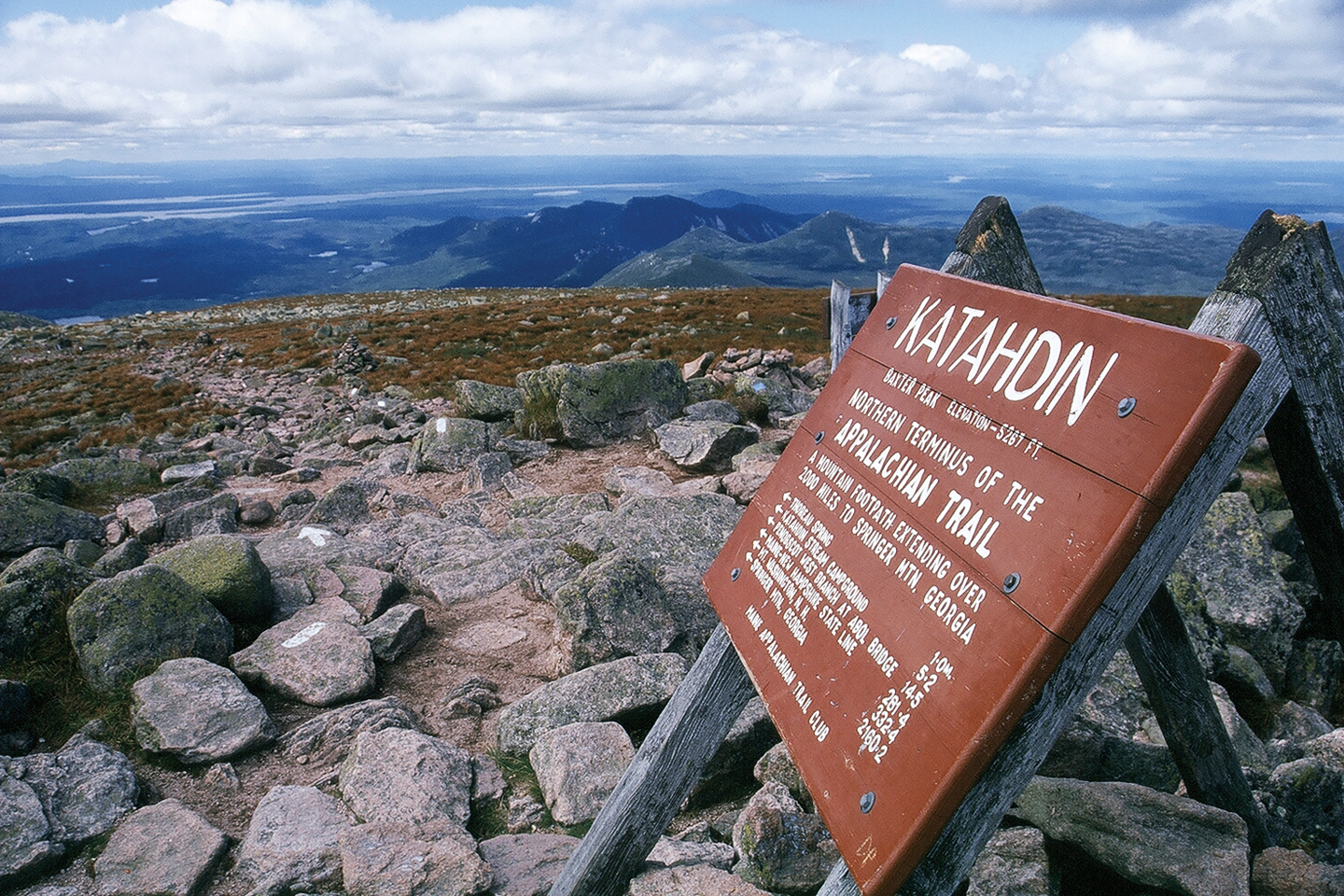
The northern terminus of the trail atop Mount Katahdin in Maine

=== Connecticut ===
Connecticut's 52 mi (84 km) of trail lie almost entirely along the ridges to the west above the Housatonic River valley.

The state line is also the western boundary of a 480 acres (190 ha) Connecticut reservation inhabited by Schaghticoke Indians. Inside it, the AT roughly parallels its northern boundary, crossing back outside it after 2,000 ft (610 m). The trail proceeds northward through the Housatonic River valley and hills to its west, veering northwesterly. At Salisbury, it ascends the southern Taconic mountains. At Lion's Head there is a view northeasterly towards Mt. Greylock and other points in Massachusetts.

At Bear Mountain, the trail is over 2,000 ft (610 m) in elevation for the first time since Pennsylvania, with views across the Hudson River valley to the Catskills, and across the broad expanse of the Housatonic valley and the Berkshire and Litchfield Hills to the east. Just north of Bear, the trail, as it crosses into Massachusetts, descends into Sages Ravine, a deep gorge in the eastern Taconic ridgeline, which is home to a fragile old growth forest. As the trail crosses the brook in the ravine, it leaves the area maintained by the Connecticut section of the Appalachian Mountain Club.

=== Massachusetts ===
Massachusetts has 90 mi (140 km) of trail. The entire section of trail is in western Massachusetts's Berkshire County. It summits the highest peak in the southern Taconic Range, Mount Everett (2,604 ft or 794 m), then descends to the Housatonic River valley and skirts the town of Great Barrington. The trail passes through the towns of Dalton and Cheshire, and summits the highest point in the state at 3,491 ft (1,064 m), Mount Greylock. It then quickly descends to the valley within 2 mi (3.2 km) of North Adams and Williamstown, before ascending again to the Vermont state line. The trail throughout Massachusetts is maintained by the Berkshire Chapter of the Appalachian Mountain Club.

=== Vermont ===
Vermont has 150 mi (240 km) of the trail. Upon entering Vermont, the trail coincides with the southernmost sections of the generally north–south-oriented Long Trail. It follows the ridge of the southern Green Mountains, summitting such notable peaks as Stratton Mountain, Glastenbury Mountain, and Killington Peak. At Maine Junction, the AT reaches an intersection with the eastern end of the North Country National Scenic Trail, with that trail and the next segment of the Long Trail departing to the north.

The AT then turns in a more eastward direction, crossing the White River, passing through Norwich, and entering Hanover, New Hampshire, as it crosses the Connecticut River. The Green Mountain Club maintains the AT from the Massachusetts state line to Route 12. The Dartmouth Outing Club maintains the trail from VT Route 12 to the New Hampshire state line.

=== New Hampshire ===
New Hampshire has 161 mi (259 km) of the trail. The New Hampshire AT is nearly all within the White Mountain National Forest. According to the Appalachian Trail Conservancy, New Hampshire has more trail above tree-line than any other Appalachian State.

For northbound thru-hikers, it is the beginning of the main challenges that go beyond enduring distance and time: in New Hampshire and Maine, rough or steep ground are more frequent and alpine conditions are found near summits and along ridges. The trail crosses 15 of the 48 four-thousand footers of New Hampshire, including 6,288 ft (1,917 m) Mount Washington, the highest point of the AT north of Tennessee and most topographically prominent peak in eastern North America.

The trail passes within half a mile of 9 additional 4,000-footer peaks in the Whites. One summit is only 60 yards from the trail. Entering the alpine zone on the summit of Mount Pierce, from the south, the trail continues in alpine or near-alpine scrub continuously along the high Presidential ridge until descending the southeast flank of Mount Madison into the Great Gulf Wilderness over 12 miles northward.

This region is subject to extremes of weather with little natural shelter and only occasional human-made shelter from the elements. The threat of severe and cold conditions in the Presidentials and across the New Hampshire Section is present year-round and requires hikers' careful attention to weather forecasts and planning, provisions and gear.

The Dartmouth Outing Club maintains the Appalachian Trail from the Vermont state line past Mount Moosilauke to Kinsman Notch, northwest of Woodstock, New Hampshire, Randolph Mountain Club maintains 2.2 miles from Osgood Trail near Madison Hut to Edmands Col, with the AMC maintaining the remaining miles through the state.

=== Maine ===
Maine has 281 mi (452 km) of the trail. The northern terminus of the Appalachian Trail is on Mount Katahdin's Baxter Peak in Baxter State Park.

In some parts of the trail in Maine, even the strongest hikers may only average 1 mph (1.6 km/h), with places where hikers must hold on to tree limbs and roots to climb or descend, which is especially hazardous in wet weather. The western section includes a mile-long (1.6 km) stretch of boulders, some of which hikers must pass under, at Mahoosuc Notch, sometimes called the trail's hardest mile.

Although there are dozens of river and stream fords on the Maine section of the trail, the Kennebec River is the only one on the trail that requires a boat crossing. The most isolated portion of the Appalachian Trail, known as the "Hundred-Mile Wilderness", occurs in Maine. It heads east-northeast from the town of Monson and ends outside Baxter State Park just south of Abol Bridge.

Park management strongly discourages thru-hiking within the park before May 15 or after October 15.

The AMC maintains the AT from the New Hampshire state line to Grafton Notch, with the Maine Appalachian Trail Club responsible for maintaining the remaining miles to Mt. Katahdin. The international extension, called the International Appalachian Trail begins at Mt. Katahdin.

== Major intersections ==
A map of the Appalachian Trail

Listed from south to north.

Southern terminus: Springer Mountain, Georgia

- SR 60 at Woody Gap in Northeast Georgia
- US 19 / US 129 / SR 11 at Neels Gap in Northeast Georgia
- SR 348 at Tesnatee Gap in Northeast Georgia
- SR 17 / SR 75 at Unicoi Gap in Northeast Georgia
- US 76 / SR 2 at Dicks Creek Gap in Northeast Georgia
- US 64 at Winding Stair Gap in North Carolina
- US 19 / US 74 at Nantahala Outdoor Center in North Carolina
- NC 143 at Stecoah Gap in North Carolina
- NC 28 in Fontana Dam, North Carolina
- US 441 / SR 71 at Newfound Gap along the North Carolina/Tennessee state line
- SR 32 at Davenport Gap along the North Carolina/Tennessee state line
- I-40 along the North Carolina/Tennessee state line
- US 25 / US 70 / NC 209 in Hot Springs, North Carolina
- US 25 / US 70 at Tanyard Gap in North Carolina
- SR 70/ NC 208 at Allen Gap along the North Carolina/Tennessee border
- NC 212/ SR 352 at Devil Fork Gap along the North Carolina/Tennessee border
- I-26 / US 23 at Sams Gap along the North Carolina/Tennessee state line
- US 19W at Spivey Gap in North Carolina
- SR 395/ NC 197 at Indian Grave Gap along the North Carolina/Tennessee border
- SR 107/ NC 226 at Iron Mountain Gap along the North Carolina/Tennessee border
- SR 143/ NC 261 at Carvers Gap along the North Carolina/Tennessee border
- US 19E near Roan Mountain, Tennessee
- US 321 / SR 67 at Watauga Lake, Tennessee
- SR 91 at Cross Mountain Gap in Tennessee
- US 421 / SR 34 at Low Gap in Tennessee
- US 58 / SR 91 in Damascus, Virginia
- US 58 near Damascus, Virginia
- US 58 at Summit Cut in Virginia
- SR 600 in Grayson County, Virginia
- SR 603 in Grayson County, Virginia
- SR 650 in Smyth County, Virginia
- SR 672 in Smyth County, Virginia
- SR 670 in Smyth County, Virginia
- SR 601 in Smyth County, Virginia
- SR 16 at Mount Rogers National Recreation Area in Virginia
- SR 622 in Smyth County, Virginia
- SR 686 twice near Atkins, Virginia
- SR 615 near Atkins, Virginia
- SR 729 near Atkins, Virginia
- I-81 / US 11 / SR 683 in Atkins, Virginia
- SR 617 near Atkins, Virginia
- SR 610 in Smyth County, Virginia
- SR 742 in Bland County, Virginia
- SR 42 in Bland County, Virginia
- SR 625 in Bland County, Virginia
- I-77 / US 52 near Wytheville, Virginia
- US 460 in Pearisburg, Virginia
- I-81 near Roanoke, Virginia
- US 501 along the James River near Eagle Rock, Virginia
- US 60 near Buena Vista, Virginia
- I-64 / US 250 near Waynesboro, Virginia
- US 33 in Shenandoah National Park
- US 211 near Luray, Virginia
- US 522 near Front Royal, Virginia
- I-66 in Front Royal, Virginia
- US 17 / US 50 near Waterloo, Virginia
- US 340 in Harpers Ferry, West Virginia
- US 340 in Sandy Hook, Maryland
- I-70 / US 40 near Hagerstown, Maryland
- US 30 near Fayetteville, Pennsylvania
- I-76 / I-81 / US 11 in Middlesex Township, Pennsylvania
- US 11 / US 15 / US 22 / US 322 in Duncannon, Pennsylvania
- I-81 near Fort Indiantown Gap, Pennsylvania
- I-476 near Slatington, Pennsylvania
- I-80 along the Pennsylvania/New Jersey state line
- US 206 near Frankford Township, New Jersey
- I-87 (New York State Thruway) near Harriman, New York
- US 6 / US 9W / US 202 near Fort Montgomery, New York
- US 9 near Garrison, New York
- Taconic State Parkway near Shenandoah, New York
- I-84 near Whaley Lake, New York
- US 7 near Falls Village, Connecticut
- US 44 near Salisbury, Connecticut
- US 7 near Great Barrington, Massachusetts
- I-90 (Massachusetts Turnpike) / US 20 near Lee, Massachusetts
- US 4 near Rutland, Vermont
- I-89 near West Hartford, Vermont
- I-91 / US 5 in Norwich, Vermont
- I-93 / US 3 near Franconia, New Hampshire
- US 302 in the White Mountain National Forest
- NH 16 at Pinkham Notch in the White Mountain National Forest
- US 2 near Gorham, New Hampshire
- US 201 in Caratunk, Maine

Northern terminus: Mount Katahdin, Maine

== Management ==
The Appalachian Trail Conservancy, originally, Appalachian Trail Conference, and the National Park Service oversee the entire length of the Appalachian National Scenic Trail via memoranda of understanding with other public agencies through whose land the trail runs, including the U.S. Forest Service, national parks, national forests, the Tennessee Valley Authority, state parks, and others, who help administer portions of the trail corridor. The estimated annual contribution of volunteer services for trail upkeep is $3 million.

== Use in research ==
The Appalachian Trail has been a resource for researchers in a variety of disciplines. Portions of the trail in Tennessee were used on a study on trail maintenance for the trail's "uniform environmental conditions and design attributes and substantial gradient in visitor use." Beginning in 2007, various organizations, including the Appalachian Trail Conservancy and the American Hiking Society, began a study to monitor environmental changes that have resulted from higher ozone levels, acid rain, smog, and other air quality factors. Such research has been supported by the National Park Service, U.S. Forest Service, Cornell University, the National Geographic Society, and Aveda Corporation.

Behavioral studies have also been conducted on hikers themselves. A 2007 study on hikers found that most persons hike the trail "for fun and enjoyment of life and for warm relationships with others" and that "environmental awareness, physical challenge, camaraderie, exercise, and solitude" were chief results among hikers. Since the highest single demographic of thru-hikers are males between the ages of 18 and 29, one informal study sought to find the correlation between this group and male college drop-outs. A study in 2018 found that around 95 percent of thru-hikers identified their race or ethnicity as white.

== In popular culture ==
- The trail was the setting for the 1998 Bill Bryson book, A Walk in the Woods, and for its 2015 film adaptation of the same name.
- The phrase, "hiking the Appalachian Trail", became a euphemism for having an affair after it was used as a cover for Mark Sanford's whereabouts during his 2009 extramarital affair.
- North to Maine is a 2009 play about the Appalachian Trail and the thru-hikers who walk it.

== See also ==
Connected U.S. long-distance trails

- Allegheny Trail
- American Discovery Trail
- Benton MacKaye Trail
- Horse Shoe Trail
- International Appalachian Trail
- Long Path
- Long Trail
- Potomac Heritage Trail
- Mason-Dixon Trail
- Mountains-to-Sea Trail
- North Country Trail
- Pinhoti National Recreation Trail
- Tuscarora Trail
- Virginia Creeper Trail

Connected National Historic Trails

- Overmountain Victory National Historic Trail
- Lewis and Clark National Historic Trail

Other U.S. long-distance trails

- Pacific Crest Trail
- Continental Divide Trail
