= North to Maine =

2009 play by Brenton Lengel

North to Maine: A Journey on the Appalachian Trail
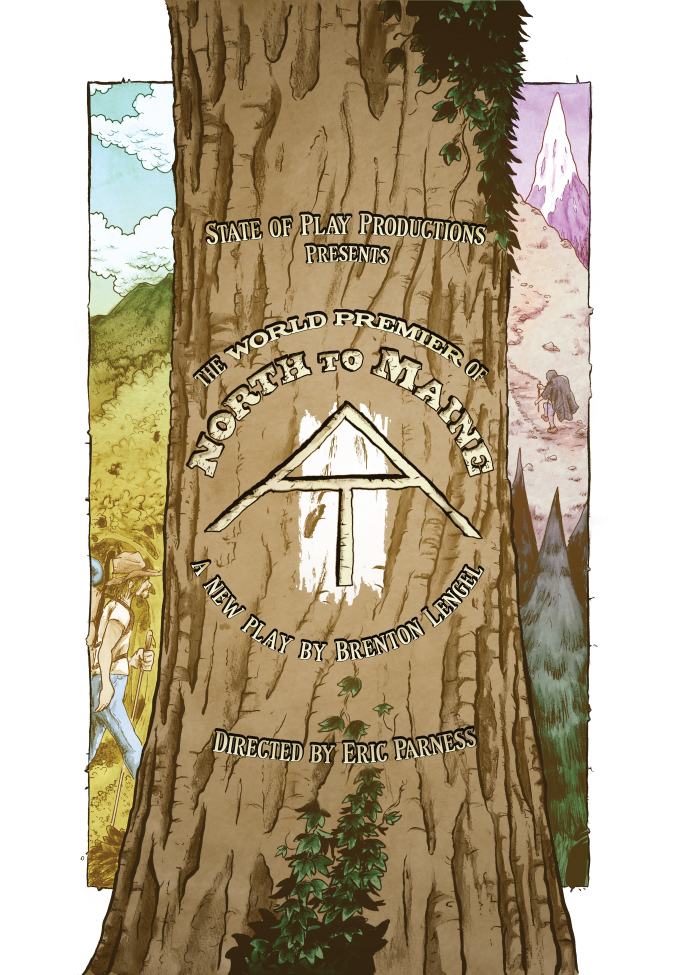
- Original Production Poster
- Original language: English
- Written by: Brenton Lengel
- Characters: Kevin Nick/Creature Man Adam/Frodo Alice/Juice Box Rockstabber
- Genre: Drama
- Setting: Appalachian Trail, May to August, 2008

Premiere
- Date: June 2013
- Place: The Living Theatre; New York, New York

North to Maine is a 2009 play by American playwright Brenton Lengel. It is the first play ever written about the Appalachian Trail and the thru-hikers who walk it. The play is sprawling and epic, with scenes taking place over the course of several months and many states, culminating with the ascent of Katahdin, the northern terminus of the Appalachian Trail.

== Plot ==
Set entirely on the Appalachian Trail, sometime during the second Gulf War, the play follows the journey of Adam, a.k.a. "Frodo," a young college graduate lacking purpose and searching for adventure along with several other thru-hikers, all of whom are similarly unmoored. Together this impromptu fellowship struggles with nature, each other, and themselves as they make the journey from Georgia north to Maine.

As the play progresses, these disparate individuals pull together and slowly reveal more of themselves to each other and the audience. Each character's story builds upon the others, and several experience moments of crisis which are solved by building human connections between them. This eventually culminates in a mad dash through the woods at night to save a hallucinating member, who is dying of an untreated spider bite, and ultimately in Adam/Frodo's ascent of Katahdin.

The plot of North to Maine lacks traditional protagonists and antagonists; as one critic puts it:

"...there are no traditional heroes or villains in this play: these people are not doing battle or even trying to master nature but rather simply become at one with it, and they are likewise never antagonists to each other, except in the heat of random particular moments; they must finally only collaborate to climb these mountains and reach the end of their journey. Their only true battles are within themselves ... "

— Martin Denton, Nytheatre.com

== Characters ==
Adam/Frodo: A young man running from a world which he perceives as forcing him into a soulless career, preferring instead the romance and high adventure contained within the work of J.R.R. Tolkien.

Nick/Creature Man: An intense and judgmental entrepreneur who lost his business and maybe some of his mind in the process.

Kevin: A sagacious former Marine looking for a way to make peace with his violent past.

Alice/Juice-box: A young woman hiking by herself, who as a result finds herself highly sought after as one of the few single women on the trail.

Rock-Stabber: A socially stunted former Marine/jazz singer/gear tester with several odd habits, including a refusal to wear trousers and the almost compulsive need to sing everywhere he goes.

== Philosophic and literary allusions ==
Throughout the play, Lengel continually references J. R. R. Tolkien's The Lord of the Rings in both its literary and cinematic incarnations. The main character's Trail Name is "Frodo," he carries a copy of The Fellowship of the Ring, and he wears a replica of The One Ring around his neck, which at the end is left hanging from the sign on top of Katahdin. During the second act, the characters remark that "The Lord of the Rings is basically a thru-hike," and Nick/Creature Man refers to the band of hikers as "the Fellowship."

Before the climax of the first act, the philosophy of Friedrich Nietzsche is referenced in a monologue comparing Adam/Frodo's Romantically inspired journey with Nietzsche's philosophy of aestheticism: living one's life as a work of art.

The play's title is taken from the final line of a poem by Earl Shaffer, the first person to walk the Appalachian Trail in its entirety:

The flowers bloom, the songbirds sing, and though it be sun or rain,
I walk the mountaintops with spring from Georgia north to Maine.

— Earl Schaffer, 1948

== Production history ==
North to Maine's premier was produced by State of Play Productions Inc. at The C.O.W. Theater (Formerly The Living Theatre), New York, NY, on June 5, 2013. It was directed by Eric Parness of Resonance Ensemble and ran for two weeks. It then went on to a three-week run at the American Theatre of Actors on 54th Street (Manhattan) from July 16-August 3, 2014.

== Critical reception ==
North to Maine's World Premier was covered by both Backpacker and Outside Magazine as well as The Leader, the internal magazine published by NOLS-WMI. The Play's development was covered by AT Journeys Magazine.

Gina Femia of New York Theatre Review wrote that it was:

"A carefully crafted and incredibly moving story ... that digs deep into the heart [and] encapsulates the human condition ... Lengel has written a timeless story that reaches out and grabs all who long for an adventure."
