= Tesnatee Gap =

Coordinates: 34.7258°N 83.8474°W

Tesnatee Gap is a mountain pass in the U.S. state of Georgia.

Tesnatee is a name derived from the Cherokee language meaning "wild turkey". Variant names are "Tessantee Gap" and "Tosnata Gap". The pass is crossed by the Appalachian Trail.
