= Maine Appalachian Trail Club =

Hiking club

The Maine Appalachian Trail Club (MATC) is a non-profit organization responsible for maintaining the Appalachian Trail between Grafton Notch and Mount Katahdin. It builds and maintains trails and trail structures as well as providing basic public information and education for the AT in the state of Maine.

The Appalachian Trail south of Grafton Notch is maintained by the Appalachian Mountain Club.
