= Paul M. Fink =

Historian, explorer, hiker, and author

Paul Mathes Fink
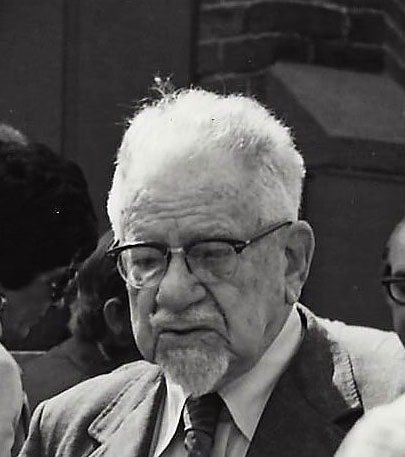
- Born: Paul Mathes Fink; June 8, 1892; Jonesborough, Tennessee
- Died: March 29, 1980; Jonesborough, Tennessee
- Spouse: Lena S. Fink
- Children: Sarah S. Fink; Elizabeth M. Fink
- Awards: Fink was inducted into the Appalachian Trail Hall of Fame in 2019

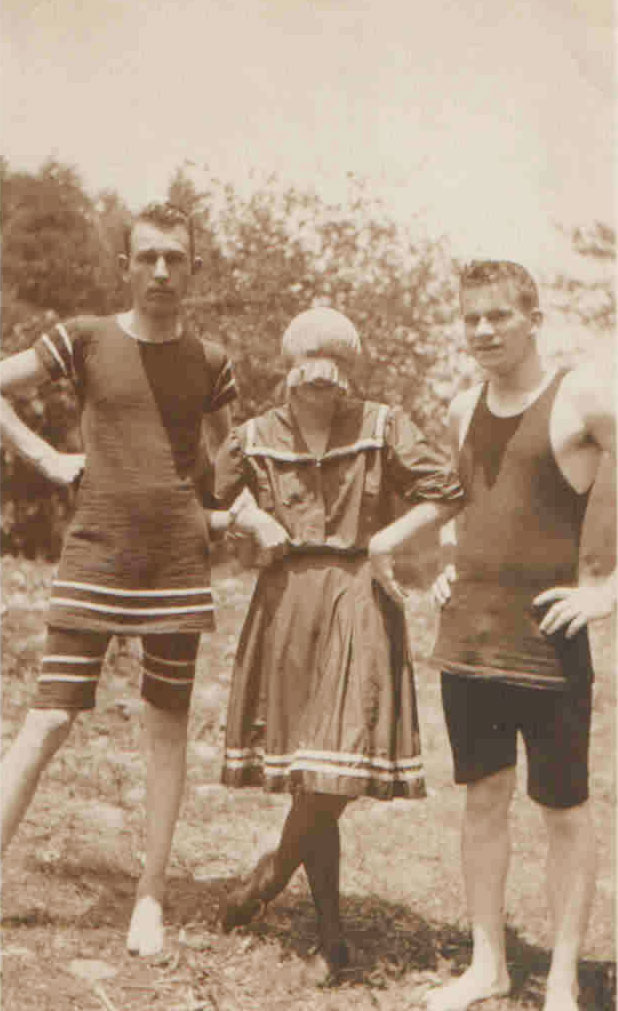
Robert McCall, Frances-Hawkins, and Paul-Fink at swimming hole

Paul M. Fink (1892–1980) was a historian, explorer, hiker, and author. He was a lifelong resident of Jonesborough, Tennessee. The official historian of Washington County, he was a prime mover in the Historic Jonesborough restoration program. His research into the history of the Town and County has been included in numerous articles in publications of the Tennessee Historical Society, the East Tennessee Historical Society and elsewhere. He served as vice president of the Tennessee Historical Society, the Tennessee Archaeological Society and the Tennessee Folklore Society. He was married to Lena S. Fink, and had two daughters, Sara and Elizabeth.

Paul Fink was honored in 1977 by the Appalachian Trail Conference as "the guiding influence" in establishing the Trail in Tennessee and North Carolina in the 1920s. Fink was inducted into the Appalachian Trail Hall of Fame in 2019. In 1922, only a year after Benton MacKaye's famous article proposing an Appalachian Trail was written, Fink began corresponding with hiking leaders in New England about building the Trail. When Myron Avery began planning the route of the Appalachian Trail in the south, Fink was the first person he contacted.

Based on letters exchanged with Horace Kephart in 1919 and the early 1920s, Fink was also an early advocate for the creation of the Great Smoky Mountains National Park, through which the Appalachian Trail travels along the Tennessee-North Carolina border. A book written by Paul Fink details many backpacking and camping trips he made into the Smokies and nearby mountain ranges, beginning in 1914 and continuing through the 1930s. Fink and his lifelong companion Walter Diehl were pioneers in backpacking in the rugged mountains of East Tennessee and Western North Carolina. Fink worked closely with David C. Chapman, Kephart, and others in promoting the Great Smokies as a national park in the early 1920s and continuing throughout the park movement. Working with George Masa and others, he was largely responsible for routing the Appalachian Trail through the Great Smokies and nearby mountain ranges. The initial proposal was to route the trail through Mt. Mitchell and the Black Mountains, staying entirely out of TN. Fink was an active leader in the Appalachian Trail Conference, serving on its Board from 1925 to 1949.

== Bibliography ==
1. "Early explorers in the Great Smokies by Paul M Fink (1932)
2. "Smoky Mountains history as told in place-names" (1934)
3. "Arnold Guyot's explorations in the Great Smoky Mountains" (1936)
4. "The nomenclaure of the Great Smoky Mountains" (1937)
5. "The early press of Jonesboro" (1938)
6. "The Bumpass Cove mines and Embreeville" (1944)
7. Back Packing Made Easy, Argosy Oct 1948
8. Build Your Own Portable Campfire Oven, Argosy Apr 1949
9. "Fifty years of freemasonry, 1823-1873 : Rhea Lodge No. 47, Jonesboro, Tennessee (1947)
10. "Samuel Cole Williams" (1948)
11. "Methodism in Jonesboro, Tennessee" (1950)
12. "That's why they call it; the names and lore of the Great Smokies" (1956)
13. "Some phases of the history of the state of Franklin" (1957), Tennessee Historical Quarterly, Vol. 16, No. 3 (September, 1957), pp. 195–213
14. "The great seal of the State of Tennessee : an inquiry into its makers", Tennessee Historical Quarterly, Vol. 20, No. 4 (DECEMBER, 1961), pp. 381–383
15. "Jacob Brown of Nolichucky" (1962)
16. "Russell Bean, Tennessee's first native son" (1965)
17. "Jonesborough, the first century of Tennessee's first town" (1972)
18. "The rebirth of Jonesboro", Tennessee Historical Quarterly, Vol. 31, No. 3 (FALL 1972), pp. 223–239
19. "Bits of mountain speech" (1974)
20. "Backpacking was the only way : a chronicle of camping experiences in the Southern Appalachian Mountains" (1975)
21. The Railroad Comes to Jonesboro, Tennessee Historical Quarterly, Vol. 36, No. 2 (Summer 1977), pp. 161–179
