= Disappearance of Gerry Largay =

2013 disappearance in Maine, U.S.

Gerry Largay
- Born: September 10, 1946
- Disappeared: July 22, 2013 (aged 66)
- Died: August 2013; Redington Township, Franklin County, Maine
- Cause of death: Starvation, exposure
- Body discovered: October 14, 2015
- Spouse: George Largay
- Children: 2

Geraldine Anita Largay was a retired nurse and U.S. Air Force veteran from Brentwood, Tennessee, who was flip-flop thru-hiking the Appalachian Trail. On July 24, 2013, she was reported overdue at a trail crossing on State Route 27 in Carrabassett Valley in Maine by her husband. One of the largest searches in the state's history ensued but was unable to locate Gerry or any clues related to her disappearance. Led by the Maine Warden Service, the initial search was suspended on July 30, with efforts scaled down on August 4, the 12th day of the search.

On October 14, 2015, a forester contracted by the U.S. Navy to survey navy property south of Mount Redington discovered a tent site that contained human remains. The remains were confirmed to be those of Largay and the Maine Medical Examiner concluded she had died from lack of food and water and environmental exposure. The site was approximately 3,000 feet (910 m) from the trail in dense woods. A journal recovered from the campsite revealed that Gerry had survived at least 19 days, until at least August 10. Canine search teams had on three occasions come to within 100 yards (91 m) of the site.

== Disappearance and search ==
Largay began hiking northbound on the Appalachian Trail in April 2013, from Harpers Ferry, West Virginia, with her trail partner, Jane Lee, though Lee had to depart the trail in New Hampshire on June 30 due to a family emergency. Lee stated that Largay had a poor sense of direction and expressed concerns about her continuing on alone. Largay's family, however, later argued that she was an experienced and capable hiker. Largay was last seen at the Poplar Ridge lean-to on the morning of July 22. She had planned to hike eight miles (13 km) to the Spaulding Mountain lean-to for the night and then hike the remaining 13 miles (21 km) to State Route 27 to meet George. By the afternoon of July 24, with Gerry overdue, George hailed a passing police officer and a search was initiated. Wardens quickly determined that Gerry was not on the trail.

It was reported that a woman had called a motel in Stratton stating she had spent the night of July 23 with Gerry at the Spaulding lean-to and to try to get word to Gerry's husband that she was going to be late. Additionally, wardens encountered three southbound hikers who thought they had passed Gerry the afternoon of July 22 a few miles south of Spaulding lean-to. The search therefore initially focused on the area past Spaulding Mountain. However, it was soon determined that the three hikers actually saw a different woman who had stayed with Gerry at Poplar Ridge on July 21 and began hiking north after Gerry had left, but never passed her nor saw her at Spaulding Mountain that night. With this new conclusion, together with data from communication with Gerry's cell phone, the search re-focused on the area north of Poplar Ridge. By the weekend, the search had grown to include over 100 volunteers, finding numerous potential clues, though ultimately none could be attributed to Gerry. The search was drastically scaled down after August 6, the 12th day of the search, though investigation and smaller-scale searches would continue. The search was featured on an episode of North Woods Law.

== Discovery and fate ==
On October 14, 2015, a forester conducting a survey of U.S. Navy property in Redington Township south of Mount Redington, used for cold weather Survival, Evasion, Resistance and Escape training, located an old campsite with what appeared to be human remains. The site is approximately 3,000 feet (910 m) from the Appalachian Trail. Upon reaching the site, the search coordinator, Lt. Adam, was immediately all but certain the campsite and remains were Largay's. Undelivered text messages recovered from her cell phone revealed she had left the trail to go to the bathroom. In another text message the following day, Largay stated she was off the trail by three or four miles (4.8 or 6.4 km), much further than the 3,000 feet (910 m) she was from the trail in reality. Largay's journal entry dated August 6 revealed she had resigned herself to her fate and made a plea to share her final location and belongings with loved ones. A final journal entry was dated August 18, though Adam was skeptical about the accuracy of that date. Previously, Lee stated that Gerry always left her backpack on the trail when relieving herself, but in this instance Gerry had apparently kept her backpack with her.

Evidence at the scene suggested Gerry had attempted to ignite nearby trees on fire to signal for help. The site was in dense woods, difficult to see from far away, though nearby was a break in the forest canopy where a campsite would have been easier to see from the air. While staying in one spot once lost to await rescue was the correct choice initially, experts discussed that after days without rescue, Largay could have chosen to move on in an effort to reach safety, such as by following a nearby stream to larger streams and eventually road crossings and civilization.

== See also ==
- Lists of people who disappeared
