= Cove Mountain, Pennsylvania =

Pair of mountain ridge lines in Perry County, Pennsylvania

Coordinates: 40°21′09″N 77°05′23″W

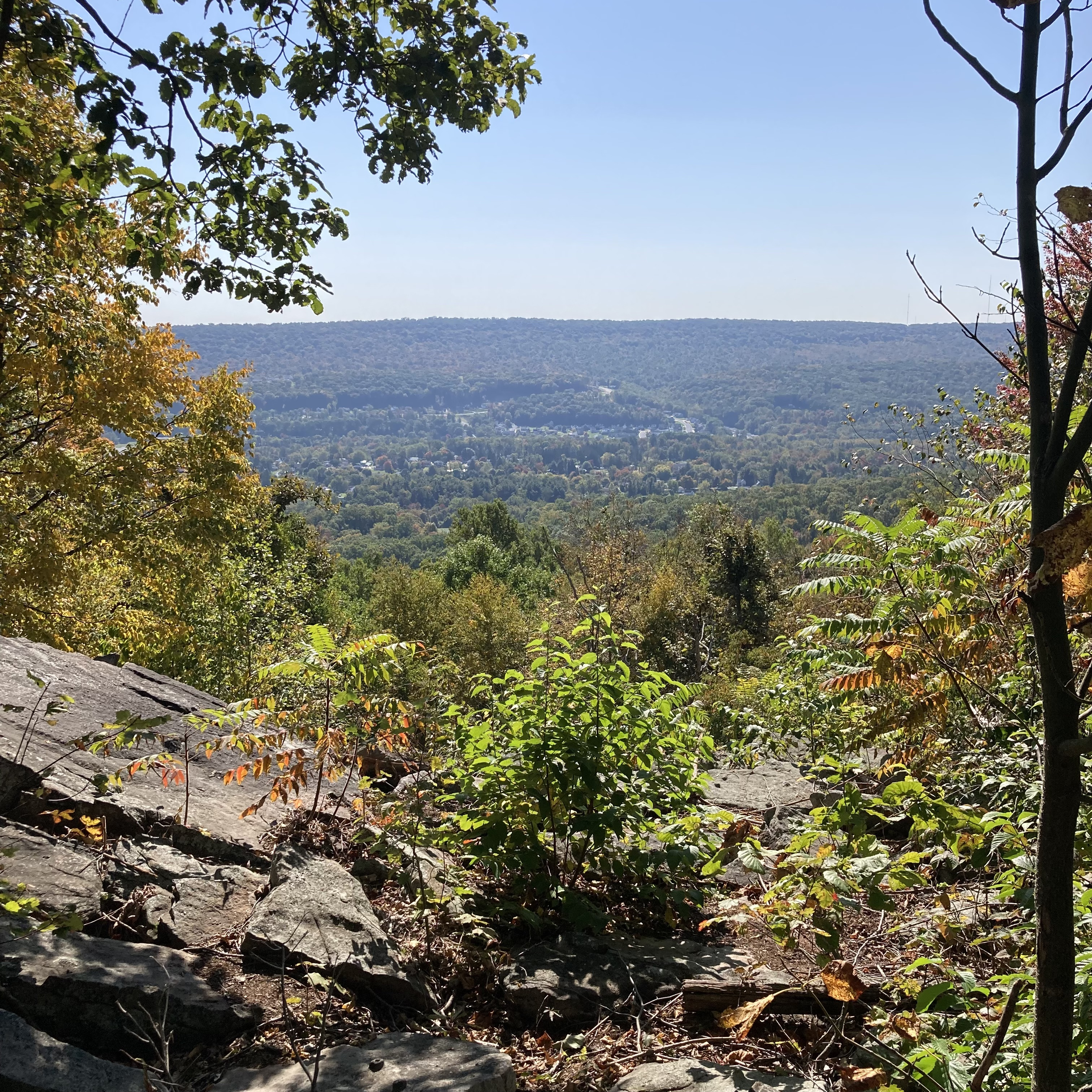
View of Marysville from Cove Mountain

Cove Mountain is a pair of mountain ridge lines in Perry County, south central Pennsylvania, in the United States. A part of the Ridge-and-Valley region of the Appalachian Mountains, Cove Mountain is a syncline that is located near the borough of Duncannon, and is approximately 15 miles (24 km) north of the state capital of Harrisburg. A 353-acre (143 ha) portion of the mountain was purchased by the Pennsylvania chapter of the Nature Conservancy in 2017, and is operated as a nature preserve that is open to the public.
