= Kendall Peak =

Mountain in Washington (state), United States

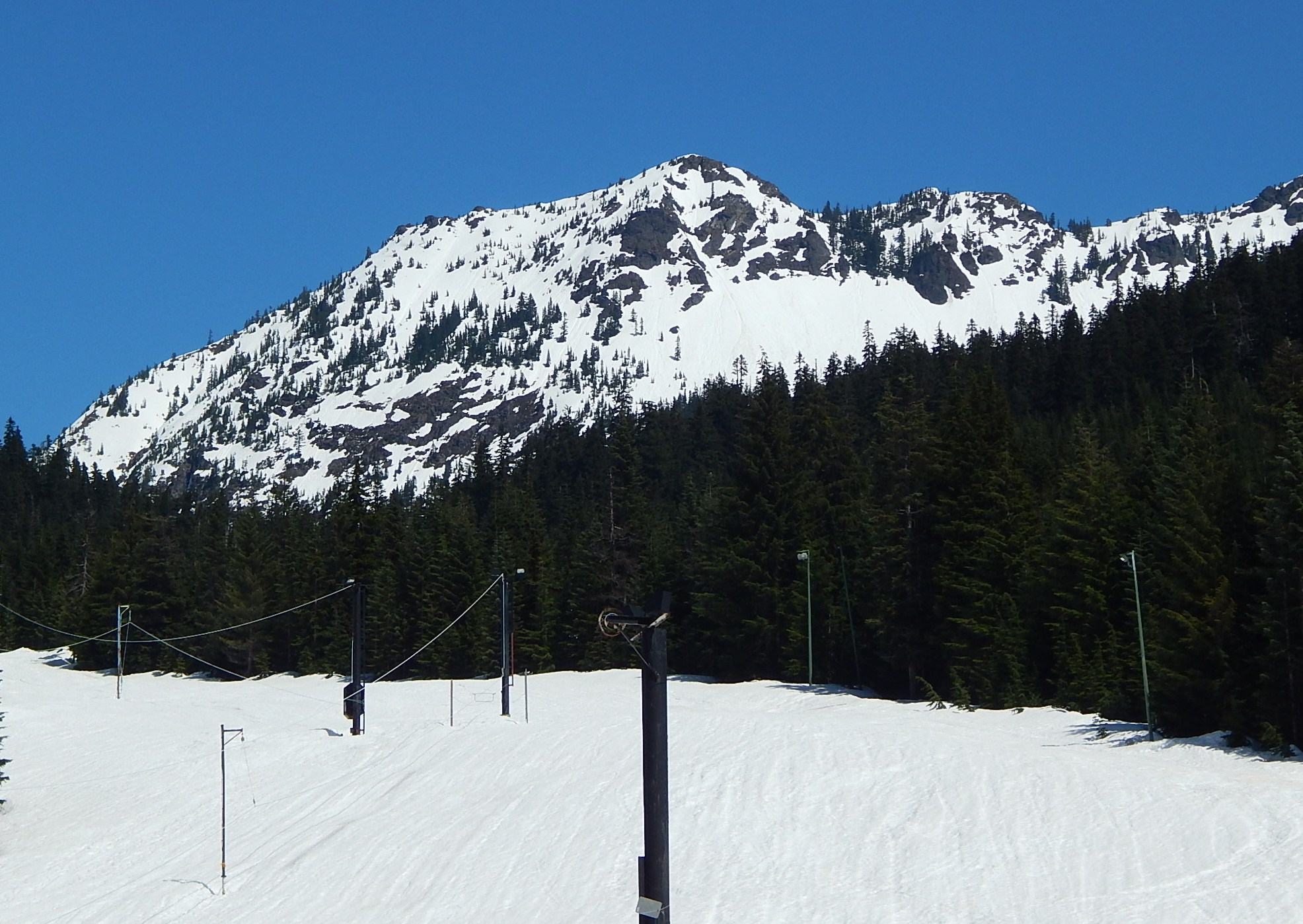
- Kendall Peak seen from Sahalie Ski Club

Highest point
- Elevation: 5,799 ft (1,768 m)
- Prominence: 383 ft (117 m)
- Coordinates: 47°26′35″N 121°23′05″W

Geography
- Location within Washington (state) Location within the United States
- Country: United States of America
- State: Washington
- County: King / Kittitas
- Protected area: Alpine Lakes Wilderness
- Parent range: Cascade Range
- Topo map: USGS Snoqualmie Pass

Climbing
- Easiest route: Scrambling

Kendall Peak is a mountain located on the county line separating King County and Kittitas County of Washington state. It is within the Alpine Lakes Wilderness on the crest of the Cascade Range. Kendall Peak is situated two miles northeast of Snoqualmie Pass on land managed by Mount Baker-Snoqualmie National Forest. Precipitation runoff on the east side of the mountain drains into Silver Creek and makes its way to the Columbia River via Yakima River, whereas the west side of the mountain drains into the South Fork Snoqualmie River via Commonwealth Creek. The Pacific Crest Trail traverses its west flank and an exposed section of the trail called Kendall Katwalk has seen tragic deaths over the years, most recently September 5, 2018. The nearest higher peak is Red Mountain, 0.9 miles (1.4 km) to the north-northwest.

== Climate ==
Kendall Peak is located in the marine west coast climate zone of western North America. Weather fronts originating in the Pacific Ocean travel northeast toward the Cascade Mountains. As fronts approach, they are forced upward by the peaks of the Cascade Range (orographic lift), causing them to drop their moisture in the form of rain or snowfall onto the Cascades. As a result, the west side of the Cascades experiences high precipitation, especially during the winter months in the form of snowfall. During winter months, weather is usually cloudy, but due to high pressure systems over the Pacific Ocean that intensify during summer months, there is often little or no cloud cover during the summer. Because of maritime influence, snow tends to be wet and heavy, resulting in high avalanche danger.

== Geology ==
The Cascades feature rugged topography with craggy peaks, ridges, and deep glacial valleys. Geological events occurring many years ago created the diverse topography and drastic elevation changes over the Cascade Range leading to the various climate differences. These climate differences lead to vegetation variety defining the ecoregions in this area. The history of the formation of the Cascade Mountains dates back millions of years ago to the late Eocene Epoch. With the North American Plate overriding the Pacific Plate, episodes of volcanic igneous activity persisted. During the Pleistocene period dating back over two million years ago, glaciation advancing and retreating repeatedly scoured the landscape leaving deposits of rock debris. The U-shaped cross section of the river valleys is a result of recent glaciation. Uplift and faulting in combination with glaciation have been the dominant processes which have created the tall peaks and deep valleys.

== Gallery ==
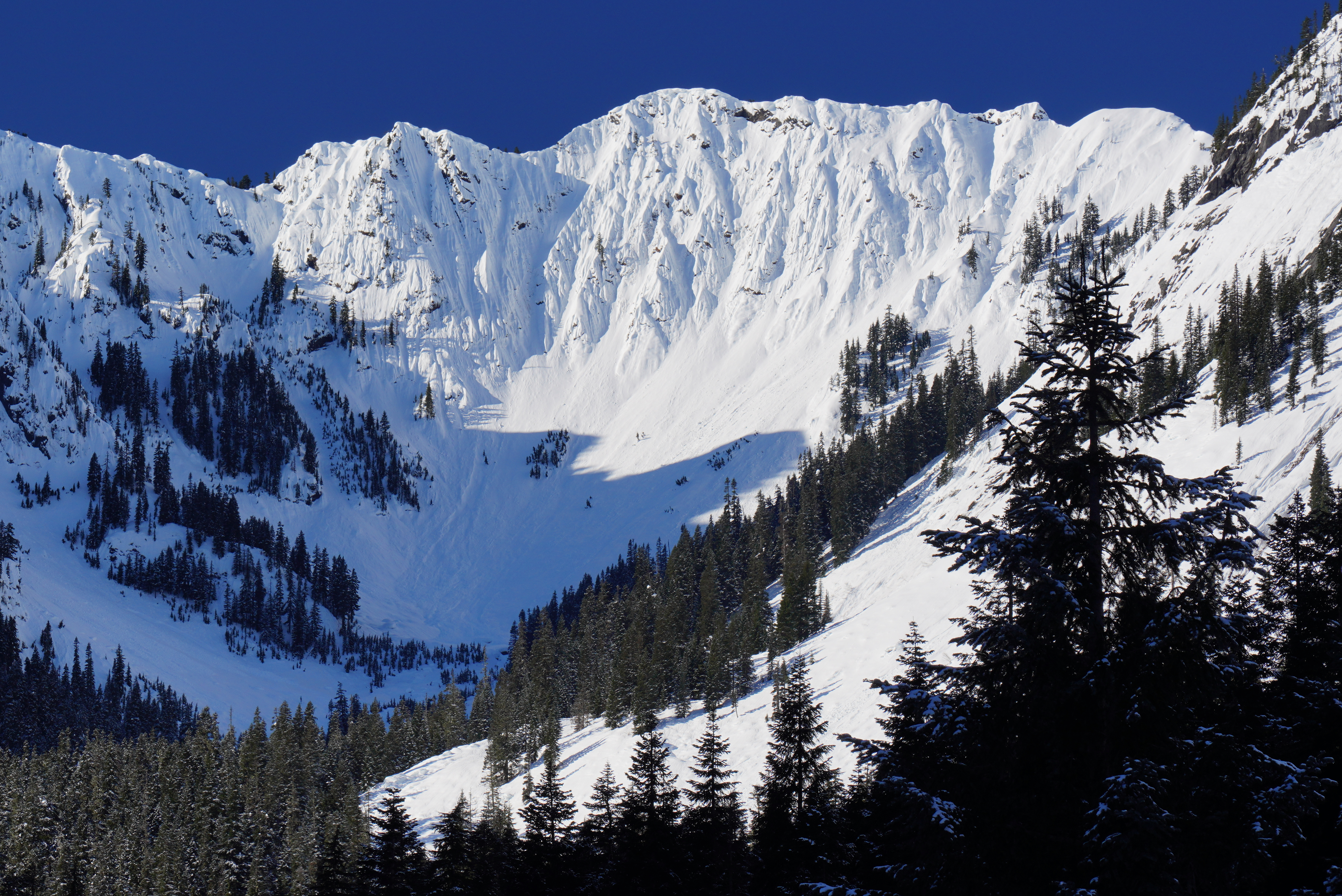
Kendall Peak, east aspect in winter

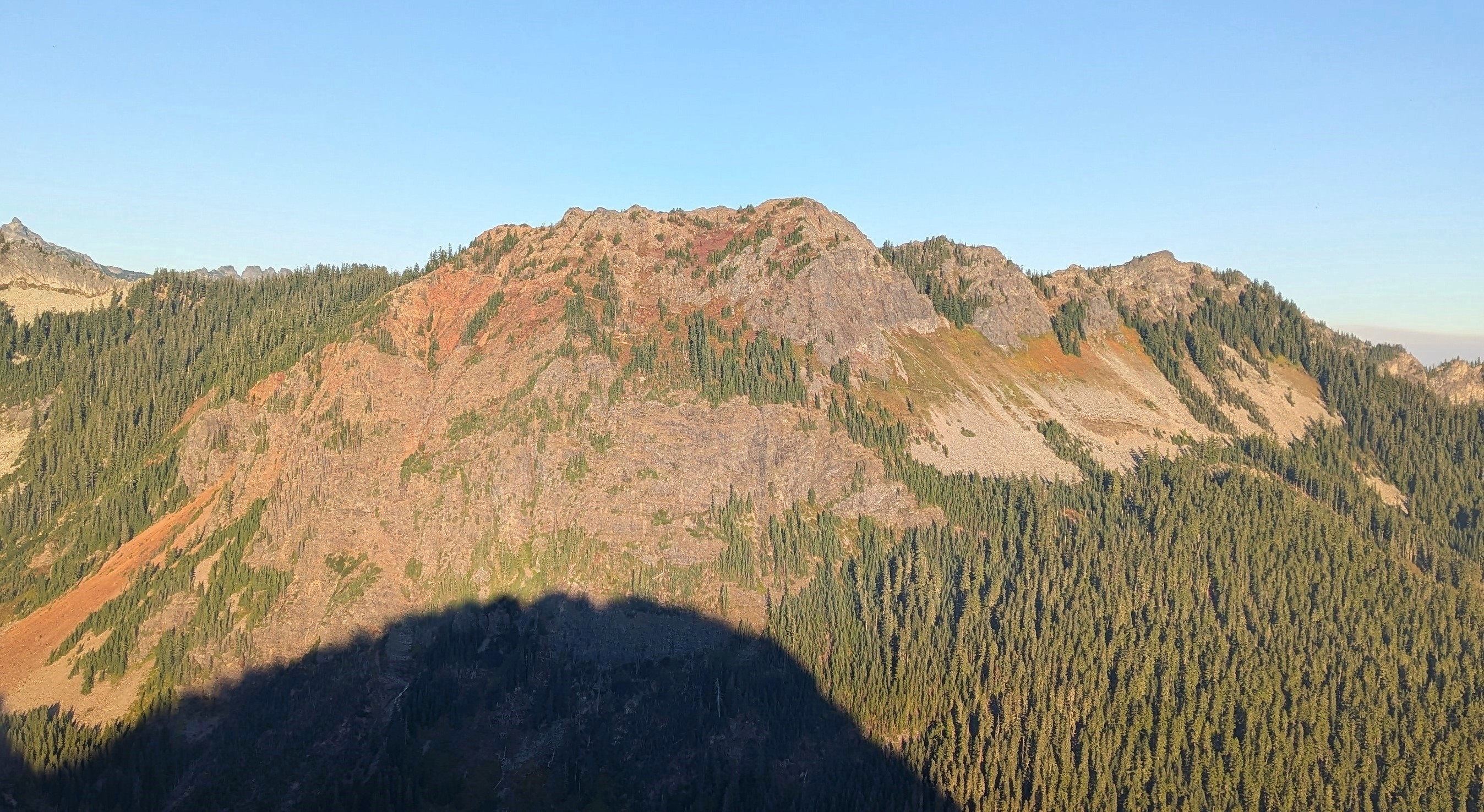
Kendall Peak viewed from Guye Peak

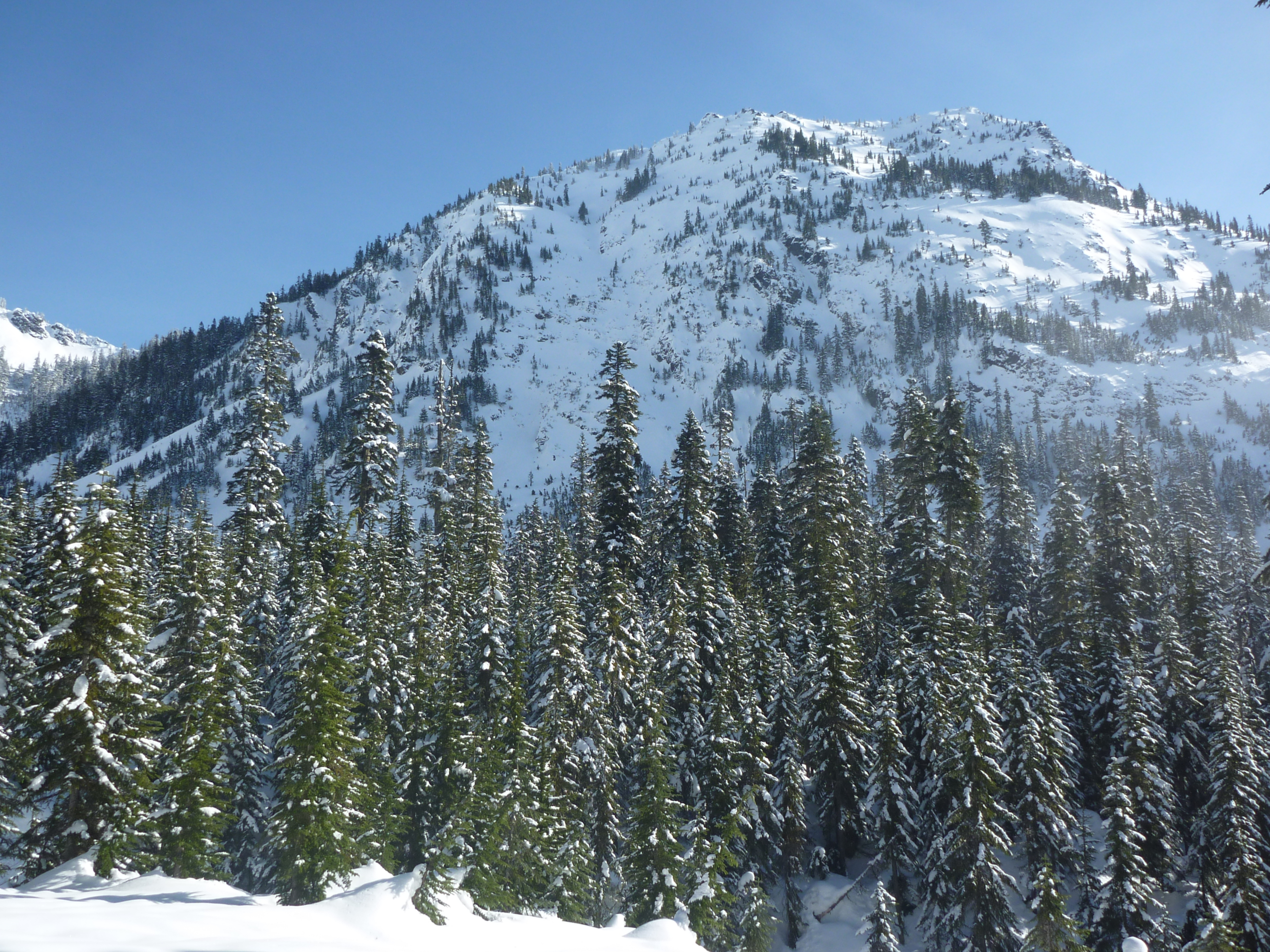
Kendall Peak

== See also ==
- List of peaks of the Alpine Lakes Wilderness
