= Oregon Skyline Trail =

Long-distance trail in the Cascade Mountains of Oregon

Coordinates: 45.8238°N 121.8562°W

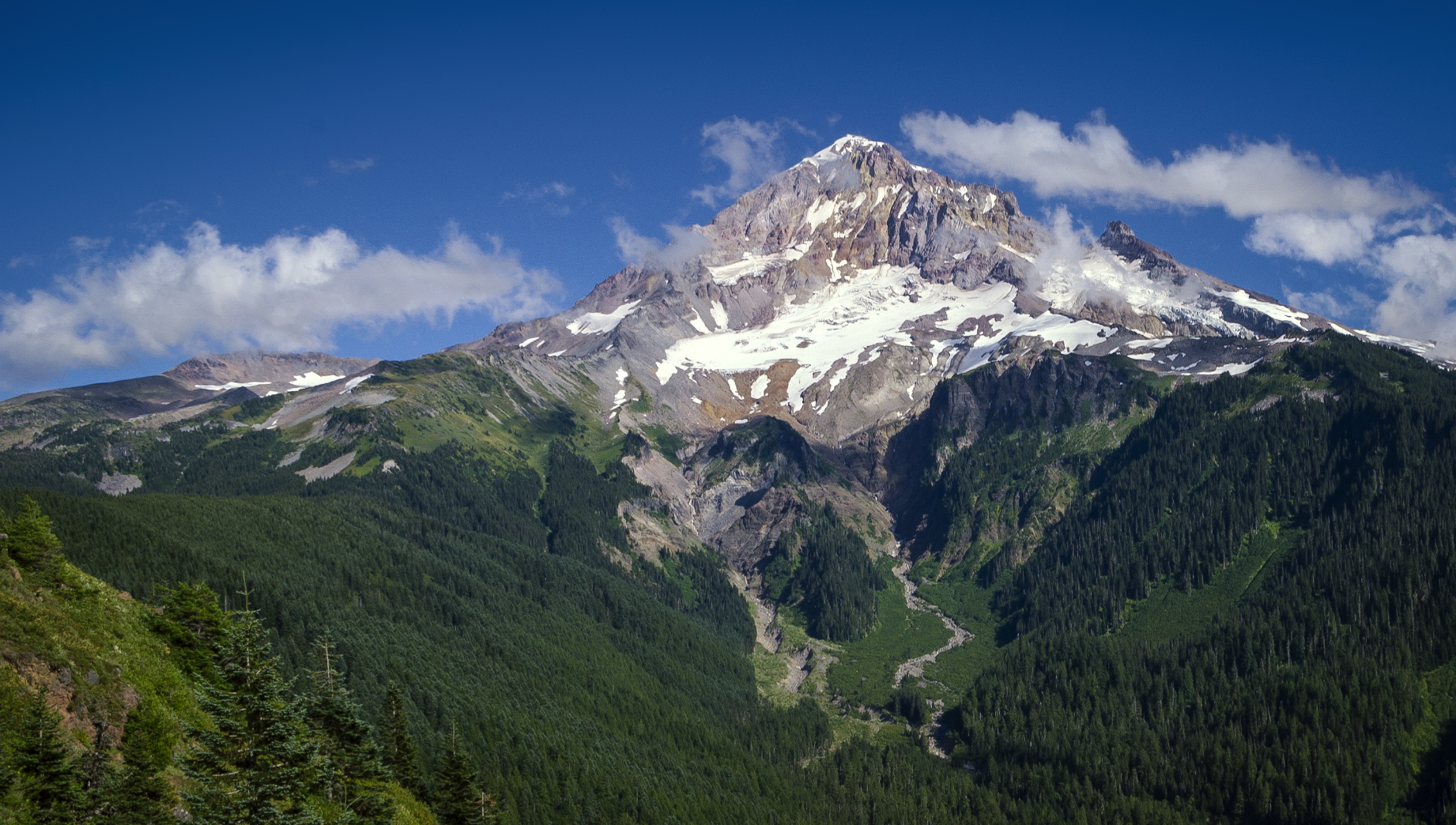
- Mount Hood viewed from the Oregon Skyline Trail/Pacific Crest Trail near Bald Mountain
- Length: 428 mi (689 km)
- Location: Oregon, United States
- Trailheads: Cascade Locks, Oregon, Siskiyou Summit, Oregon
- Use: backpacking, hiking, horseback riding
- Elevation change: 62,840 ft (19,154 m)
- Highest point: Saddle north of Mount Thielsen, 7,560 ft (2,304 m)
- Lowest point: Cascade Locks, 220 ft (67 m)
- Difficulty: Moderate to strenuous
- Months: July to September
- Sights: Columbia River Gorge, Cascade Mountains, Crater Lake National Park, Cascade-Siskiyou National Monument
- Hazards: Snowmelt and icy slopes early in the season, severe weather, dehydration

The Oregon Skyline Trail is a long-distance trail in the Cascade Mountains of Oregon. The trail extends 428 miles (689 km) from Cascade Locks on the Columbia River south to Siskiyou Summit near the Oregon-California border. The century-old trail is a foot and equestrian path that passes through nine wilderness areas, Crater Lake National Park, and Cascade-Siskiyou National Monument. Historically known as the Oregon Skyline Trail or Skyline Trail, the entire length of the trail was incorporated into the Pacific Crest National Scenic Trail in 1968.

== History ==
The Oregon Skyline Trail was established in 1920 when a United States Forest Service team led by ranger Fredrick William Cleator explored and marked a 260-mile (420 km) route between Mount Hood and Crater Lake. The route was described as “a combination or connection of rough mountain trail and road, located or constructed in disjointed manner, at different times by forest rangers, stockmen, miners, trappers and Indians.”

In 1926 the idea of a continuous trail extending from Canada to Mexico was proposed, and creation of a Pacific Crest Trail System was underway. This system was to link several existing long-distance trails including the Cascade Crest Trail in Washington; the Oregon Skyline Trail; and the Tahoe–Yosemite Trail and John Muir Trail in California.

By 1936 the Oregon Skyline Trail had been extended to reach across the state, from the Columbia Gorge Ranger Station near the town of Cascade Locks south to beyond Soda Mountain, just a few miles from the California border. The trail was then about 400 miles (640 km) long and had been extensively relocated to more closely follow the backbone of the mountains, thereby affording hikers and equestrians more scenic views.

In 1968 the Pacific Crest Trail System was designated as the Pacific Crest National Scenic Trail or Pacific Crest Trail (PCT). The Oregon Skyline Trail was integrated into the new trail and was then referred to as the Oregon Section of the Pacific Crest National Scenic Trail. Today the name Oregon Skyline Trail is more often used in a historical context.

== Route ==
The Oregon Section of the PCT (Oregon Skyline Trail), as it is currently routed, extends 428 miles (689 km). The northern terminus is at the Bridge of the Gods in Cascade Locks, Oregon. The trail then courses south at or near the crest of the Cascade Mountains, passing prominent volcanoes and natural features. The trail passes through the Mark O. Hatfield, Mount Hood, Mount Jefferson, Mount Washington, Three Sisters, and Diamond Peak Wilderness Areas, Crater Lake National Park, the Sky Lakes Wilderness, and Cascade-Siskiyou National Monument, which includes the Soda Mountain Wilderness. Near Pilot Rock, the trail comes to within two miles of the California border before extending further west to its southern terminus at Siskiyou Summit. The low point of the trail is at Bridge of the Gods (elevation 220 ft (67 m)), and the high point of the trail is on a saddle north of Mount Thielsen (elevation 7,560 ft (2,304 m)). Altogether, there is 62,840 feet (19,154 m) of elevation gain and 58,780 feet (17,916 m) of elevation loss on a north-to-south trip.

Many stretches of the Oregon Skyline Trail have been rerouted since its inception in 1920. Some of the old paths are still in use today and are considered alternate paths to the standard PCT route. Other segments have been abandoned and nature has rendered them nearly undetectable. These old paths continue to be of interest to those studying the history of the Oregon Skyline Trail.

=== Southern Terminus ===
The southernmost 38 miles (61 km) of the trail were the last to be developed. The 1934 reconnaissance report of William Royer and the 1936 Forest Service trail map indicate an intent to route the trail from Old Baldy to the southwest toward Soda Mountain and Pilot Rock near Siskiyou Summit. This route would have kept the trail primarily on public lands.

However, by 1945 the trail had been oriented in a more southerly direction, primarily along unpaved roads and through private property, to Copco Lake in northern California. Here the trail was connected to a path that continued the Pacific Crest Trail System south into California.

In 1973, the announced route of the newly designated Pacific Crest National Scenic Trail showed the trail once again oriented southwest from Old Baldy and on to Siskiyou Summit. Siskiyou Summit is identified as the southern terminus of the Oregon Section of the PCT.

== Hiking ==
Permits are required for overnight stays in some wilderness areas along the Oregon Skyline Trail/PCT and the alternate routes. These free, self-issued permits can be obtained while on the trail, usually at the wilderness boundary. Camping in the backcountry of Crater Lake National Park requires a permit. Signing the register where the trail enters the Park serves as a permit for Oregon Skyline Trail/PCT thru hikers.

The trail crosses paved roads at or near Barlow Pass, Santiam Pass, McKenzie Pass, Willamette Pass, Crater Lake National Park, Fish Lake, and Green Springs Summit, which facilitates resupplying for thru hikers and provides trail access for section hikers. Multiple resupply options are available near the trail. Access to water in southern Oregon can be limited and long stretches of waterless trail can be expected.

== See also ==
- John Muir Trail
- Long-distance trails in the United States
- Tahoe–Yosemite Trail
