= Kendall Katwalk =

1979 man made narrow cliff face trail, Washington, US

Coordinates: 47.451796°N 121.378716°W

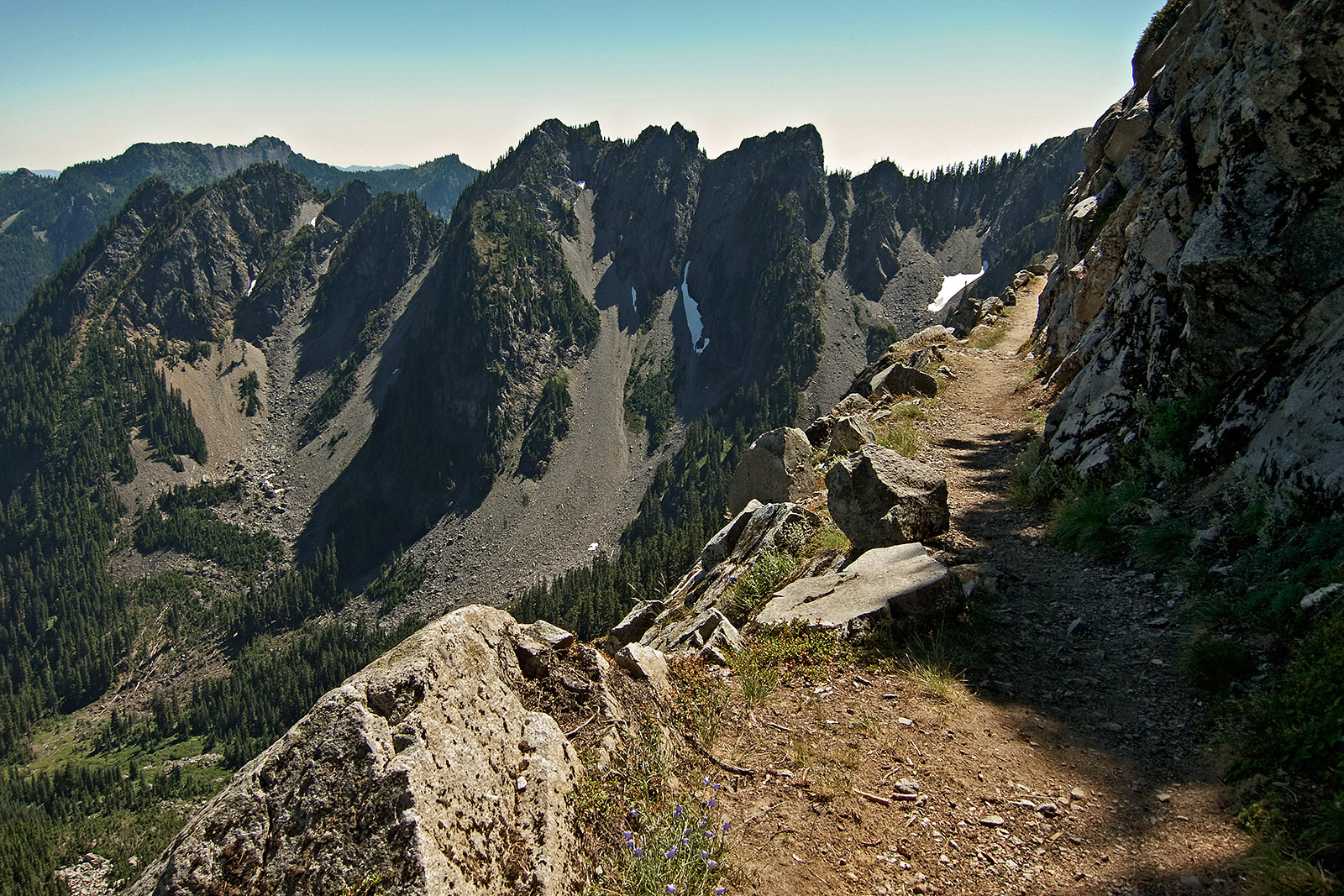
- Kendall Katwalk
- Length: Approx. 150 yards (140 m)
- Location: Kittitas County, Washington
- Trailheads: Snoqualmie Pass
- Use: Hiking, Trail running, Backpacking
- Highest point: 5,440 feet (1,660 m)
- Lowest point: Base, 5,440 feet (1,660 m)
- Difficulty: Moderate
- Season: June to October
- Hazards: Severe weather

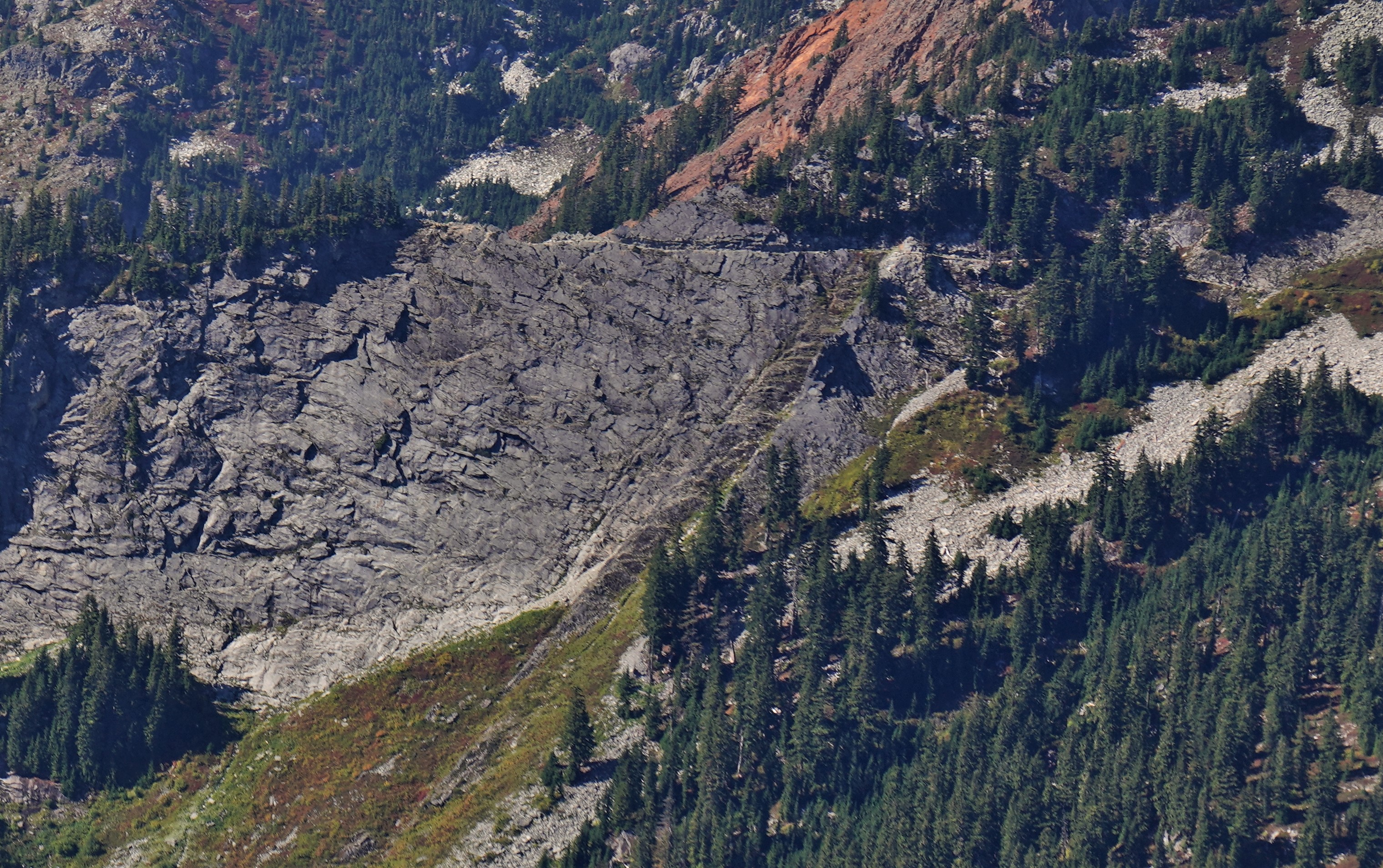
Kendall Katwalk seen from Alta Mountain

Kendall Katwalk is a 150 yard long narrow pathway blasted out of a steeply sloped granite rock face on the north ridge of Kendall Peak approximately 6 miles northeast of Snoqualmie Pass. It is a segment of Section J of Pacific Crest Trail and the construction was completed in 1975. It is a popular destination for day hikers, trail runners, and backpackers

== See also ==
- Mount Katahdin's Knife Edge
