= Scott Williamson (hiker) =

American thru-hiker

Scott Williamson is an American thru-hiker, most noted for being the first person to complete a continuous one-season round trip of the Pacific Crest Trail (PCT). He is also noted for his speed records for hiking the PCT.

== Hiking accomplishments ==
In 1995, Williamson completed the hiking “Triple Crown”, a coveted achievement among thru-hiker community. The “Triple Crown” consists of thru-hiking the "Big 3" National Scenic Trails: The Pacific Crest Trail (PCT), the Continental Divide Trail (CDT), and the Appalachian Trail (AT). Williamson completed the PCT in 1993 by using a lightweight style of hiking, with a pack base weight of 15 pounds (6.8 kg). Williamson completed a thru-hike of the CDT in 1994, after a training hike of 1,000 miles (1,600 km) on the PCT. Finally, Williamson completed a thru-hike of the AT in 1995, by starting at the southern tip of Florida, hiking northward on the Florida Trail, continuing northward 400 miles (640 km) to get to the official start of the AT in Georgia at Springer Mountain, then completing the entire AT.

After attempting to perform a round-trip, or "yo-yo" of the PCT in 1996, 1997, 2000, and 2003, Williamson became the first person to perform a round-trip of the PCT in 2004. That trip started at the Mexico–US border, went to the Canada–US border, then returned to Mexico, for a total of 5,300 miles (8,500 km) in 205 days.

In 2006, Williamson became the first person to repeat the feat of "yo-yo"ing the PCT by becoming the second person to complete a PCT "yo-yo", doing it in 191 days.

In 2007, Williamson married his longtime girlfriend Michelle Turley and the newlyweds celebrated their honeymoon by thru-hiking the PCT southbound from Canada to Mexico.

In 2008, Williamson and Joe Kisner broke the unsupported speed record of the PCT, breaking Kisner's previous record-of 79 days, 21 hours and 42 minutes by over 8 days. The new record they set was 71 days, 2 hours and 41 minutes. This equates to an average distance of just under 38 miles (61 km) per day. In this case, "unsupported" means in the style of a thru-hiker, where supplies are obtained by hiking off the trail.

In 2009, Williamson and Adam Bradley broke simultaneously two PCT speed records for both the unsupported effort and the supported (assisted by a support crew for supplies, food and shelter) speed record of ultramarathon runner David Horton. Horton's previous record was 66 days, 7 hours, and 16 minutes, which Williamson and Bradley broke by about 21 hours. The new double record they set was 65 days, 9 hours, and 58 minutes. This equates to an average distance of approximately 40.5 miles (65.2 km) per day. Williamson and Bradley did their hike of the PCT without taking any detours or re-routes due to trail conditions. In addition, Williamson and Bradley did not accept any rides to re-supply in trail towns, which added approximately 20 miles (32 km) to their total walking distance.

In 2011, Williamson set a new PCT speed record, unsupported, by completing the trek in 64 days, 11 hours, 19 minutes. Like the 2009 record, this new record broke both the supported and unsupported speed records. The new record equates to an average distance of approximately 41.1 miles (66.1 km) per day. Unlike the record set in 2009, this PCT speed record was set going from north to south. Williamson finished at the Mexican border October 11. And finally as in 2009, Williamson did the hike of the PCT without taking any detours or re-routes due to trail conditions, nor accepted rides for re-supply.

As of 2011, Williamson has had over a 19 year hiking career, logged over 47,000 miles (76,000 km) and thru-hiked the PCT 13 times.

== Personal life ==
In 1996, while working at a convenience store in Richmond, California, Williamson was shot in the face during an attempted robbery. The bullet is still lodged in his head.

Williamson states, “being shot, coming that close to death, that made me focus more on what I felt was important in my life,” and “if the hiking is very important to me, I’m going to pursue that, regardless of what other people may think. It made me more willing to just follow my passion.”

Williamson also states, “I don’t own a home. I’m self-employed. I drive derelict vehicles I have to work on every weekend, but it’s been well worth it. The sacrifices I’ve had to make to get out on the trail every summer has been well worth it.”

Williamson is married and lives in California with his wife.

== See also ==
- Ultralight backpacking
- Pacific Crest Trail
