= Tahoe–Yosemite Trail =

Long-distance trail in California, US

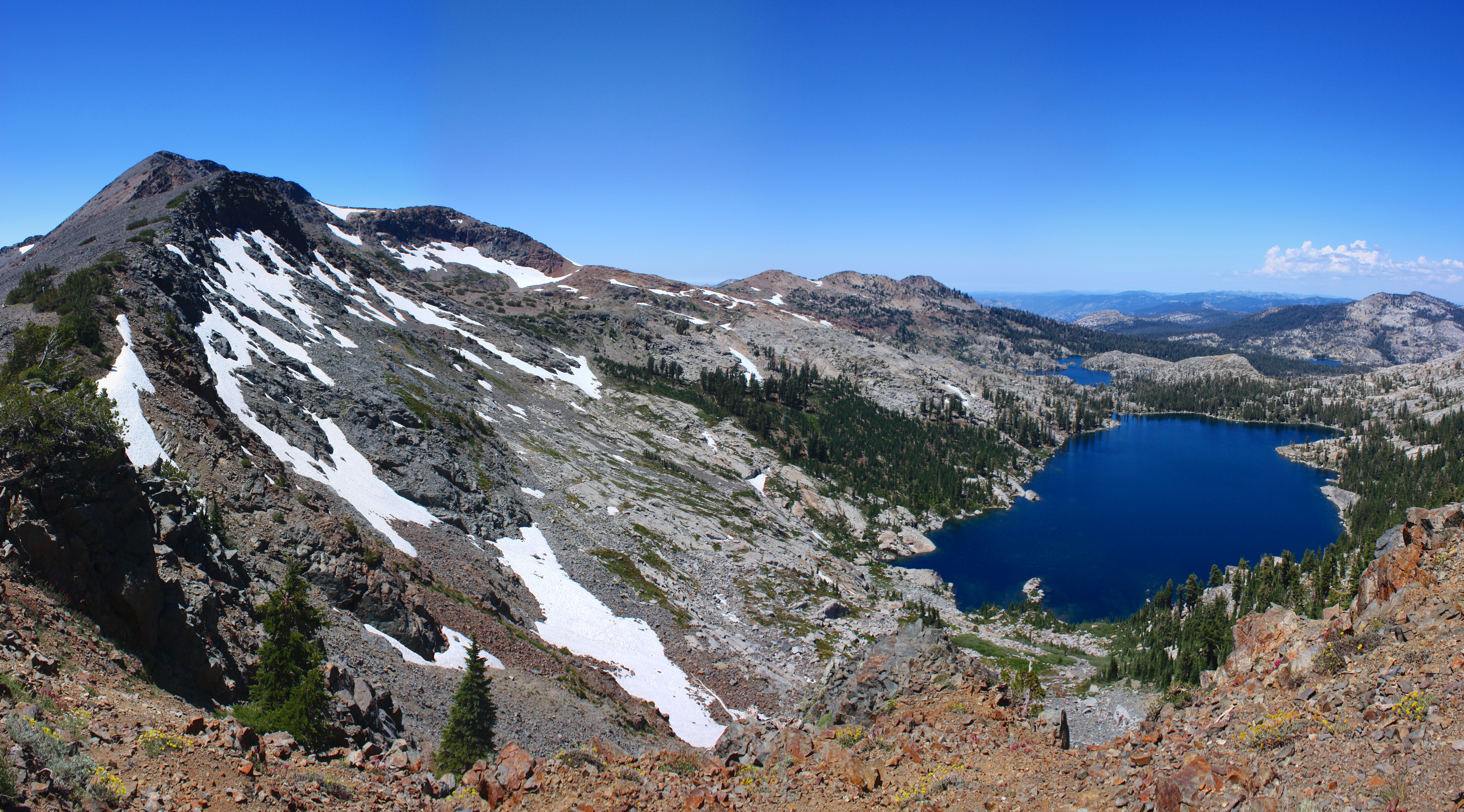
- Looking northwest from the Tahoe-Yosemite Trail at Dick's Pass.
- Length: 186 mi (299 km)
- Location: California, United States
- Trailheads: Meeks Bay trailhead, Tuolumne Meadows trailhead
- Use: backpacking, hiking, trail running, horseback riding, pack trains
- Difficulty: Moderate to strenuous
- Months: July to September
- Sights: Lake Tahoe, Yosemite National Park, Sierra Nevada
- Hazards: Snowmelt, icy slopes, and river crossings in early season; thunderstorms; altitude

The Tahoe–Yosemite Trail (TYT) is a long-distance trail in the Sierra Nevada mountain range of California. The trail courses 186 miles (299 km) from Meeks Bay at Lake Tahoe to Tuolumne Meadows in Yosemite National Park. The trail is a foot and equestrian path that passes through the Desolation, Mokelumne, Carson-Iceberg, Emigrant, and Yosemite Wilderness Areas and the Meiss Country (Dardanelles) Roadless Area.

== History ==
The United States Forest Service had begun work on the Tahoe–Yosemite Trail by 1916 with the intent of providing a path from Meeks Bay at Lake Tahoe to the northern boundary of Yosemite National Park. The expectation was that the National Park Service would then complete the trail south to Tuolumne Meadows and connect it to the John Muir Trail (JMT). Work on the trail was interrupted in 1918 due to the country's involvement in World War I.

The Pacific Crest Trail (PCT) was first proposed in the 1920s and was to link several existing long-distance trails to create a continuous path from Canada to Mexico. Early maps and descriptions of the PCT delineate these trail segments, which included the TYT and adjacent JMT. The PCT path described in the Federal Register in 1973, however, does not make reference to the TYT, and today the TYT is considered an unofficial path.

== Routes ==
=== The Winnett Route ===
First published in 1970, Thomas Winnett's The Tahoe-Yosemite Trail popularized the trail. He described a 186-mile (299 km) route that combined segments of the PCT path, historical TYT/PCT paths that had long been rerouted off roads and moved onto newly constructed trail, and altogether new routes chosen by the author. The result was a route that included Forest Service and Park Service maintained trails, road walks, trails no longer maintained, and cross-country routes through trailless terrain. Winnett hoped the book would encourage the Forest Service to officially recognize his TYT route, but even with five editions, the last published in 1987, the TYT remained an unofficial route.

There is continued interest in Winnett's route for hikers seeking remoteness, the challenge of route finding and cross-country travel, and the opportunity to visit lower-elevation ecosystems as the route detours west of and below the Sierra Crest.

=== The PCT Route ===
Hiking from Meeks Bay to Tuolumne Meadows can be done on officially recognized and maintained trails. The Forest Service recognizes the beginning of the TYT as the Meeks Bay Trailhead. The trail runs 12 miles (19 km), generally southwest, to join the PCT one mile north of Middle Velma Lake. The PCT is then followed 171 miles (275 km) south to Tuolumne Meadows. This route is 183 miles (295 km) long with the lowest elevation being 6,240 feet (1,900 m) at the Meeks Bay Trailhead and the highest elevation being 10,880 feet (3,320 m) on the ridge south of Sonora Pass. The total elevation gain along the trail is 35,100 feet (10,700 m) and the elevation loss is 32,700 feet (10,000 m).

== Hiking ==
A permit is required to hike the TYT and can be obtained from the Lake Tahoe Basin Management Unit for hikers beginning at the Meeks Bay Trailhead and from Yosemite National Park for hikers beginning at Tuolumne Meadows. Food must be stored in approved hard-sided bear canisters within the backcountry of Yosemite National Park.

The TYT crosses paved roads at or near Echo Summit, Carson Pass, Ebbetts Pass, and Sonora Pass, which facilitates resupplying for thru hikers and provides trail access for section hikers.

== See also ==
- Ecology of the Sierra Nevada
- John Muir Trail
- Long-distance trails in the United States
- Pacific Crest Trail
- Tahoe Rim Trail
