= Pacific Crest Trail =

Long-distance hiking and equestrian trail in the western US

- Length: 2,653 mi (4,270 km)
- Location: Mexico (border) / California / Oregon / Washington, US / British Columbia, Canada
- Designation: National Scenic Trail
- Trailheads: Campo, California; Manning Park, British Columbia
- Use: Hiking; Horseback riding
- Elevation change: 489,000 ft (149,000 m)
- Highest point: Forester Pass, 13,153 ft (4,009 m)
- Lowest point: Cascade Locks, 140 ft (43 m)
- Months: Late April to Late September
- Sights: Sierra Nevada (U.S.); Cascade Range
- Hazards: Severe weather Dehydration; Avalanches; Falling; Forest fires Landslides; Volcanic ash (rare); Black bears Venomous snakes Hypothermia; Mountain lions Diarrhea from water Lightning strike
- Website: Pacific Crest National Scenic Trail

Trail map
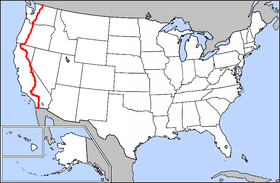

The Pacific Crest Trail (PCT), officially designated as the Pacific Crest National Scenic Trail, is a long-distance hiking and equestrian trail closely aligned with the highest portion of the Cascade and Sierra Nevada mountain ranges, which lie 100 to 150 miles (160 to 240 km) east of the U.S. Pacific coast. The trail's southern terminus is next to the Mexico–United States border, just south of Campo, California, and its northern terminus is on the Canada–US border, upon which it continues unofficially to the Windy Joe Trail within Manning Park in British Columbia; it passes through the states of California, Oregon, and Washington.

The Pacific Crest Trail is 2,653 mi (4,270 km) long and ranges in elevation from roughly 110 feet (34 m) above sea level near the Bridge of the Gods on the Oregon–Washington border to 13,153 feet (4,009 m) at Forester Pass in the Sierra Nevada. The route passes through 25 national forests and 7 national parks. Its midpoint is near Chester, California (near Mt. Lassen), where the Sierra and Cascade mountain ranges meet. The overall elevation gain for the Pacific Crest Trail is approximately 489,000 ft (149,000 m).

It was designated a National Scenic Trail in 1968, although it was not officially completed until 1993. The PCT was conceived by Clinton Churchill Clarke in 1932. It received official status under the National Trails System Act of 1968.

The Pacific Crest Trail, the Appalachian Trail, and the Continental Divide Trail form what is known as the Triple Crown of Hiking in the United States. The Pacific Crest Trail is also part of the 6,875-mile (11,065 km) Great Western Loop.

== Route ==
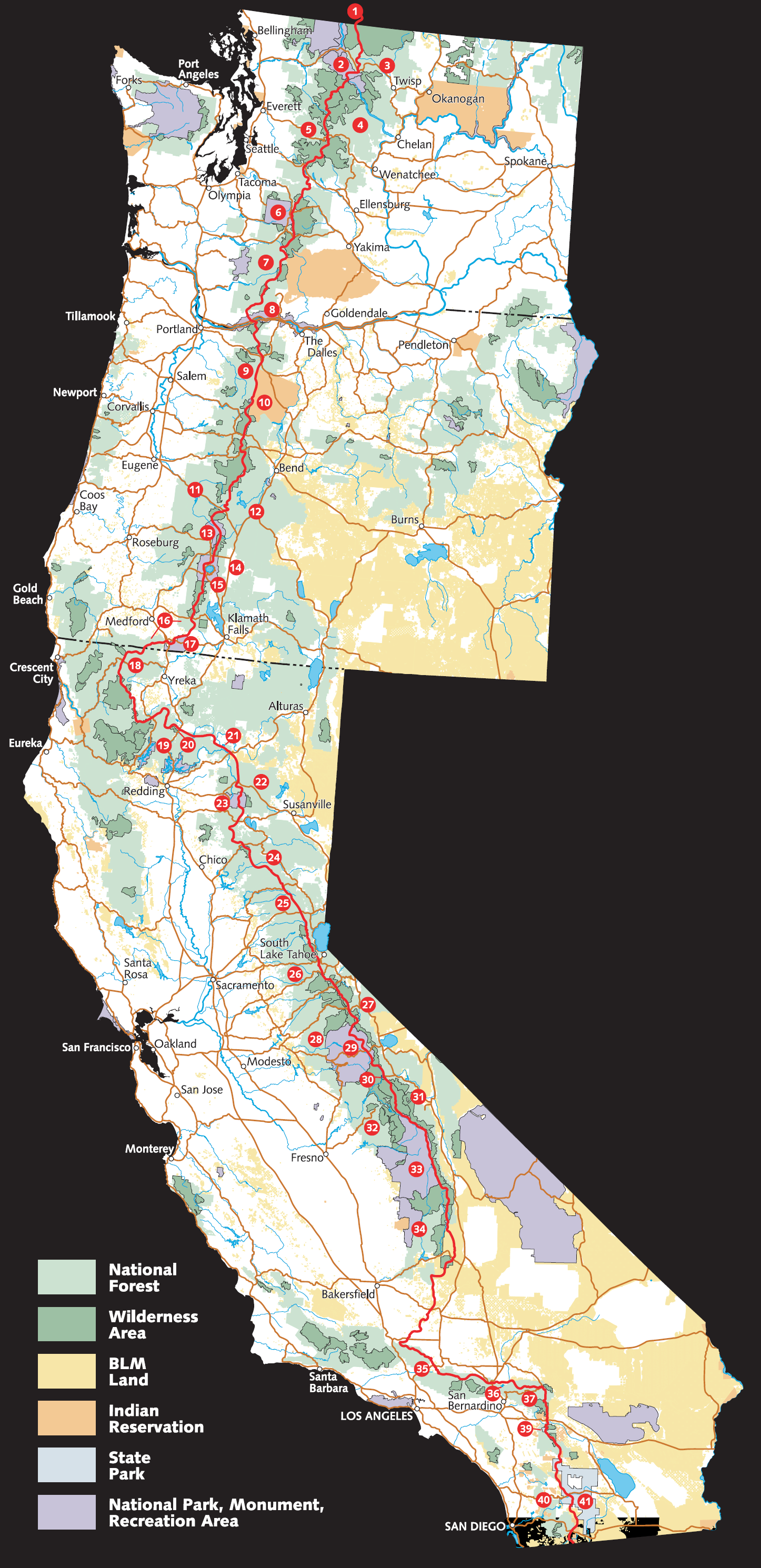
PCT overview from Forest Service brochure

The route is mostly through National Forest and protected wilderness. It also passes through seven national parks: Kings Canyon, Sequoia, Yosemite, Lassen Volcanic, Crater Lake, Mt. Rainier, and North Cascades. The trail avoids civilization and covers scenic and pristine mountainous terrain with few roads. It passes through the Laguna, Santa Rosa, San Jacinto, San Bernardino, San Gabriel, Liebre, Tehachapi, Sierra Nevada, and Klamath ranges in California, and the Cascade Range in California, Oregon, and Washington.

== History ==
The Pacific Crest Trail (PCT) was inspired by the Appalachian Trail in the Eastern U.S. In 1926 Catherine T. Montgomery, an outdoorswoman from Bellingham, Washington, proposed that the Mountaineers build a trail through the mountains of the Western U.S. from Canada to Mexico. Montgomery's contributions to the initial concept of the PCT have only been uncovered in recent years, earning her the moniker "Mother of the Pacific Crest Trail".

Montgomery explained her idea to the mountaineer Joseph Hazard, and he raised it with Bellingham's Mount Baker Club the same day. Over the next couple years, the club worked with others throughout the Pacific Northwest, like the Mountaineers, to devise the trail. Hazard credited the Forest Service with providing early support for preparing the northernmost segment from Canada to the Columbia River. Fred. W. Cleator had led the Forest Service's design of the Skyline Trail through Oregon beginning in 1920 and planned an extension through Washington.

In 1932 Clinton C. Clarke, chairman of the Mountain League of L.A., organized the Pacific Crest Trail System Conference to unite outdoor groups in advocating for the trail. Clarke is known as the "Father of the Pacific Crest Trail" for this reason. The first conference included the Boy Scouts, YMCA, Sierra Club, Mountaineers, and many others, with Ansel Adams on the executive committee.

Clarke proposed to link the John Muir Trail, the Tahoe–Yosemite Trail (both in California), the Skyline Trail (in Oregon) and the Cascade Crest Trail (in Washington). He asked the Civilian Conservation Corps to build out connections between the trails. From 1935 through 1938, YMCA groups explored the 2,000 miles (3,200 km) of potential trail and planned a route, which has been closely followed by the modern PCT route. 40 groups of teenagers, led by Warren Rogers, logged their journeys between Mexico and Canada. Clarke remained president of the conference for 25 years, and Rogers eventually became its executive secretary.

In 1968, President Lyndon B. Johnson defined the PCT and the Appalachian Trail with the National Trails System Act. The PCT was then constructed through cooperation between the federal government and volunteers organized by the Pacific Crest Trail Association. In 1993, the PCT was officially declared finished.

The Trust for Public Land has purchased and conserved more than 3,000 acres (12 km^{2}) along the PCT in Washington. Consolidation of this land has allowed for better recreational access as well as greater ease to manage conservation lands.

A bicycle touring route has been developed to parallel the PCT on paved and unpaved roads.

== Thru-hiking ==
Thru-hiking is a term used in referring to hikers who complete long-distance trails from end to end in a single trip. Thru-hiking is a long commitment, usually taking between four and six months, that requires thorough preparation and dedication. The Pacific Crest Trail Association estimates that it takes most hikers between six and eight months to plan, train, and get ready for their trips. It is estimated the average completion rate is around 14%.

While most hikers travel from the southern terminus at the Mexico–US border northward to Manning Park, British Columbia, some hikers prefer a southbound route. In a normal weather year, northbound hikes are most practical due to snow and temperature considerations. Additionally, some hiker services are seasonal and may be better timed for northbound hikers. If snowpack in the Sierra Nevada is high in early June and low in the Northern Cascades, some hikers may choose to 'flip-flop.' Flip-flopping can take many forms but often describes a process whereby a hiker begins at one end (on the PCT, usually the southern end) of the trail and then, at some point, like reaching the Sierra, 'flips' to the end of the trail at the Canada–US border and hikes southbound to complete the trail. However, it is not currently possible to legally cross the border in either direction on the trail.

Hikers also have to determine their resupply points. Resupply points are towns or post offices where hikers replenish food and other supplies such as cooking fuel. Hikers can ship packages to themselves at the U.S. Post Offices along the trail, resupply at general and grocery stores along the trail, or any combination of the two. The final major logistical step is to create an approximate schedule for completion. Thru hikers have to make sure they complete enough miles every day to reach the opposite end of the trail before weather conditions make sections impassable. For northbound thru-hikers, deep snow pack in the Sierra Nevada can prevent an early start. The timing is a balance between not getting to the Sierra too soon nor the Northern Cascades too late. Most hikers cover about 20 miles (32 km) per day.

In order to reduce their hiking time and thereby increase their chances of completing the trail, many hikers try to substantially reduce their pack weight. Since the creation of the Pacific Crest Trail there has been a large movement by hikers to get away from large heavy packs with a lot of gear. There are three general classifications for hikers: Traditional, Lightweight, and Ultralight.

== Notable hikers ==
Before the PCT became an official trail, Martin Papendick was the first known person to hike across three states of the PCT in 1952. After being one of the first to finish the Appalachian Trail in 1951, Papendick hiked between July 4 and December 1, 1952, from British Columbia to the Mexico–US border over the crests of the mountains along the Pacific Coast, a feat he reported in a periodical under the title "Pacific Crest Trails".

On October 16, 1970, Eric Ryback, an 18-year-old student, completed the first PCT thru-hike. His personal congratulations came by telegram from Edward P. Cliff, Chief of the U.S. Forest Service. Ryback is credited, recognized, and has been honored by the Pacific Crest Trail Association as the official first thru-hiker of the entire trail. Ryback completed the Appalachian Trail in 1969 (as a 16-year-old); the Pacific Crest Trail in 1970; and a route approximating today's Continental Divide Trail in 1972. Ryback's 1971 book The High Adventure of Eric Ryback: Canada to Mexico on Foot focused public attention on the PCT. Ryback carried an 80-pound (36 kg) pack on his 1970 thru-hike. He had only five resupply packages on the entire trip and was loaded with 40 pounds (18 kg) of food at the start of each leg. He often ran out of food and foraged or went hungry. Ryback also helped the Forest Service lay out future plans for the PCT.

Ryback's claim is disputed. When the guidebook publisher Wilderness Press stated that Ryback had used motor transport in places along the PCT, Ryback sued for $3 million but withdrew the suit after Wilderness Press revealed statements from the people who claim to have picked up the young hiker along highways parallel to the 2,600-mile trail (4,200 km). Ryback is in Smithsonian's top 9 list of people Cheating Their Way to Fame though it notes that "the claims that Ryback 'cheated' are still doubted by some".

Richard Watson, who completed the trail on September 1, 1972, was often credited as the first PCT thru-hiker because Papendick was generally unknown and Ryback may have accepted rides. The first woman to complete the PCT was Mary Carstens, who finished the journey later in 1972, accompanied by Jeff Smukler.

The first person to thru-hike the entire PCT both ways in a single continuous round-trip was Scott Williamson, who completed the "yo-yo" circuit on his fourth attempt in November 2004. Williamson traveled a total of 5,300 miles (8,530 km) in 197 days, covering an average of 35 to 40 miles (56 to 64 km) per day when not in snow – an overall average of 27 miles (43 km) per day – wearing an extremely ultra-lightweight pack, which "without food, weighed about 8.5 pounds (3.9 kg)". Williamson then went on to complete a second round trip on November 28, 2006, cutting two weeks off his 2004 time.

In 2014, Olive McGloin (from Ireland) became the first woman to thru-hike the PCT both ways in a single continuous round-trip.

The youngest person to hike the trail is Christian Thomas Geiger, who at the age of 6 completed the trail with his parents Andrea Rego and Dion Pagonis. Christian, also known by his trail name Buddy Backpacker, was also the youngest person to hike the Appalachian Trail until 2020.

Other notable young hikers include Sierra Burror and Reed Gjonnes. Burror, who completed a continuous thru-hike of the trail in 2012 at the age of 9, is the youngest girl to thru-hike the trail. She completed her hike with her mother, Heather Burror. Gjonnes, who thru-hiked the trail in 2011 at age 11, went on to complete the Triple Crown of Hiking, becoming the youngest person ever to do so.

Teddi Boston hiked from Canada to Mexico on the PCT in 1976 at the age of 49. She was one of the first women to hike the trail alone.

An autobiographical account of a woman hiking a portion of the PCT alone in 1995 at age 26 was written by Cheryl Strayed. Her memoir Wild: From Lost to Found on the Pacific Crest Trail was published in 2012 and reached #1 on the New York Times Best Sellers list. Her hike is the subject of the 2014 film Wild, starring Reese Witherspoon.

The first two reported deaths on the Pacific Crest Trail were in November 1995, when thru-hikers Jane and Flicka Rodman were killed during a detour down California State Route 138 in Southern California, when they were struck by a motorist who lost control of his vehicle. They were less than 400 miles (640 km) from their goal of reaching the Mexico–US border.

In 2019, German independent film makers Oliver Heise and Sabine Willmann hiked the PCT and conducted 250 interviews with hikers, some of whom they followed up later at their homes. Their documentary named Lauf!" screened in German movie theatres in November 2026. The oldest person to thru-hike the trail is not fully established, with multiple competing claims.

=== Fastest known times ===
==== Self-supported ====
On August 7, 2013, Heather "Anish" Anderson of Bellingham, Washington, set the self-supported speed record. She completed the PCT in 60 days, 17 hours, 12 minutes, beating the previous record by almost 4 days. She documented this journey in her book Thirst. In 2018 she became the first woman to complete the Triple Crown of Hiking in a single calendar year.

Exactly nine years later, on August 7, 2022, Josh Perry improved upon the self-supported speed record, completing the PCT in 55 days, 16 hours and 54 minutes.

In 2023, Nick Fowler set a new self-supported record of 52 days, 9 hours and 18 minutes. While he was in the Sierra Nevada, Hurricane Hilary hit California, and he needed to spend 41 hours sheltering in a cave from the weather.

Three years later, in 2026, Fowler bested his self-supported record by completing the trail in 45 days, 17 hours and 47 minutes, covering an average of 57 miles per day. He went through 15 pairs of shoes, traveling from the Canadian border to southern California. Fowler said he spent the previous year training for the big hike.

==== Supported ====
On August 10, 2014, Joseph McConaughy of Shoreline, Washington, set a new supported speed record and the overall fastest known time for the PCT. The distance was covered in 53 days, 6 hours, and 37 minutes. This surpassed the previous record of 59 days, 8 hours, 14 minutes, set by Josh Garret on August 8, 2013, by more than 6 days. Joe was supported by a team of three hikers.

McConaughy's record was broken on August 14, 2016, by Karel Sabbe, a 27-year-old dentist from Ghent, Belgium. He covered the distance in 52 days, 8 hours, and 25 minutes, averaging over 50 miles (80 km) a day and shaving almost a day (22 hours) off the previous record set by McConaughy. Sabbe was supported by his friend Joren Biebuyck.

On July 22, 2021, 37-year-old ultra-runner Timothy Olson broke Sabbe's record with a time of 51 days, 16 hours and 55 minutes, fifteen and a half hours faster than Sabbe's time. Olson was crewed by a small group of family and friends.

On August 26, 2023, Karel Sabbe took back his record with a time of 46 days, 12 hours and 56 minutes, more than five days faster than Olson's time.

== Equestrian use ==
Don and June Mulford made the first verifiable equestrian Thru-Ride of the PCT in 1959. In that year the Pacific Crest Trail stretched a poorly-marked 2,400 miles (3,900 km) from Mexico to Canada. More concept than footpath, the trail was an oft-broken, high-ridge track disappearing regularly from map and terrain. On April 19, 1959, on an empty scrub sage plain seven miles east of Tijuana, with four horses, Don and June Mulford began their journey north to the Washington–Canada border. The Mulfords went to Hollywood for three months immediately after the ride and were featured on network television. June's old press book yields a half-dozen TV-Guide pages, and she recalls, "Art Linkletter was such a nice man. We appeared on his 'House Party' show and he had coffee with us afterward". High Road to Danger, a syndicated TV show, made an episode on their ride. Even after they had returned home to the Northwest, there was continued TV coverage. A January 1961 TV Guide records their appearance on Portland's KOIN Red Dunning Show. The Mulfords even made a 90-minute movie and showed it around 12 western states for 10 years.

The Murray family (Barry, Bernice, Barry Jr. and Bernadette) completed the trek on horseback on October 7, 1970.

== Alterations and connections ==
In 2008, an agreement for realignment through Tejon Ranch in Southern California was reached. This realignment would relocate 37 miles (60 km) of the PCT from the Mojave Desert floor to the more scenic Tehachapi Mountains. While an agreement was reached, the realignment is a long-term project; many details remain to be determined, as well as an Optimal Location Review, a lengthy process through which the ideal path for the new section of the trail is specified.

Portland, Oregon's 40-Mile Loop proposes to extend the Springwater Corridor hiking and bicycling spur trail to connect the Pacific Crest Trail with the proposed Cazadero Trail. Plans are currently in progress to add a dedicated pedestrian/equestrian lane to the Bridge of the Gods across the Columbia River. Currently, PCT hikers and equestrians must cross the bridge walking in vehicle traffic lanes, a potential danger which the new lane will eliminate. The completion date for this project is unknown.

== Permits ==
The Pacific Crest Trail can require several different permits. If thru-hiking, the only permits needed are the PCT Long-distance Permit and the California Fire Permit. The Long-distance Permit allows hikers the convenience of only having to get one permit to cover all the areas that they would otherwise need a local permit for. Up to 8,000 Long-distance permits are issued each year, with the most popular type, northbound from south of Sonora Pass, being limited to 50 per day during the months of March, April, and May. Local permits are required on many parts of the trail for people hiking less than 500 contiguous miles. The California Fire Permit allows the use of a camping stove or lantern. Campfires are allowed only on some parts of the PCT due to the high fire risk.

The Canada PCT entry permit allowed hikers to end their hike about 8 miles into Canada but was discontinued by the Canadian Border Services Agency as of January 31, 2025.

== Notable locations ==
The following notable locations are found along or adjacent to the route of the Pacific Crest Trail. They are listed from south to north to correspond with the itinerary typically followed by thru-hikers to take advantage of the best seasonal weather conditions. The numbers in parentheses correspond to the numbers on the PCT overview map above.

=== California ===
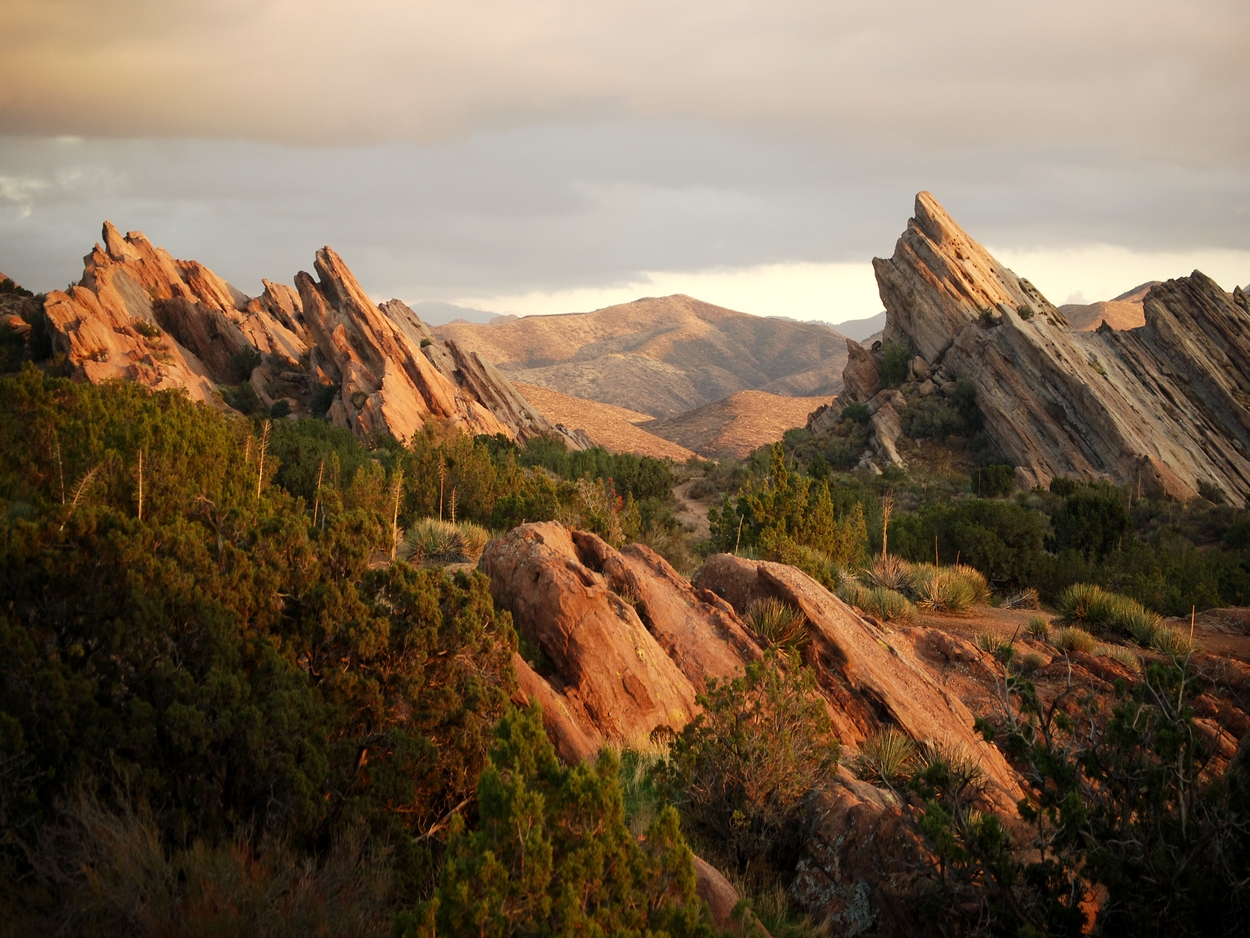
Vasquez Rocks

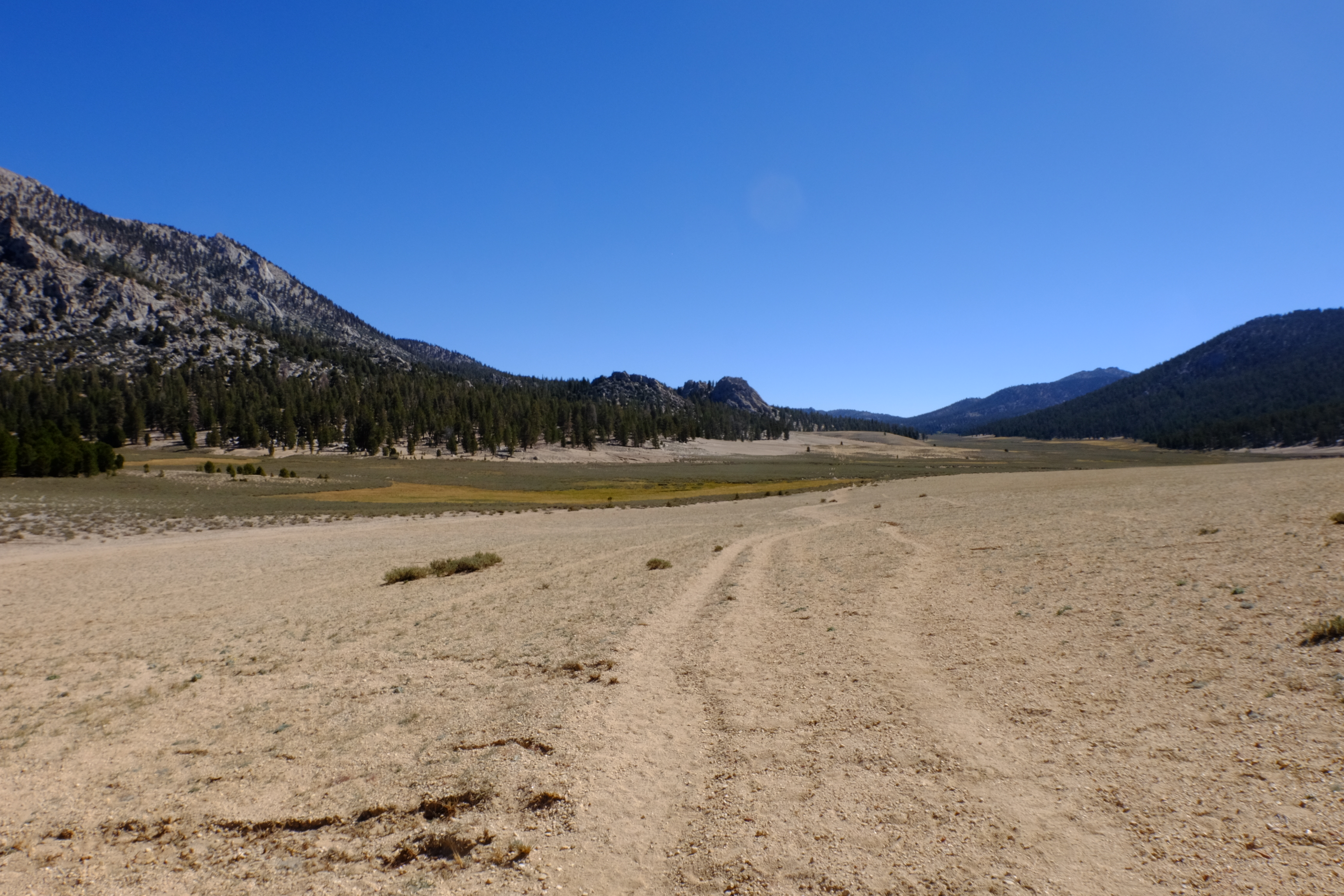
Golden Trout Wilderness

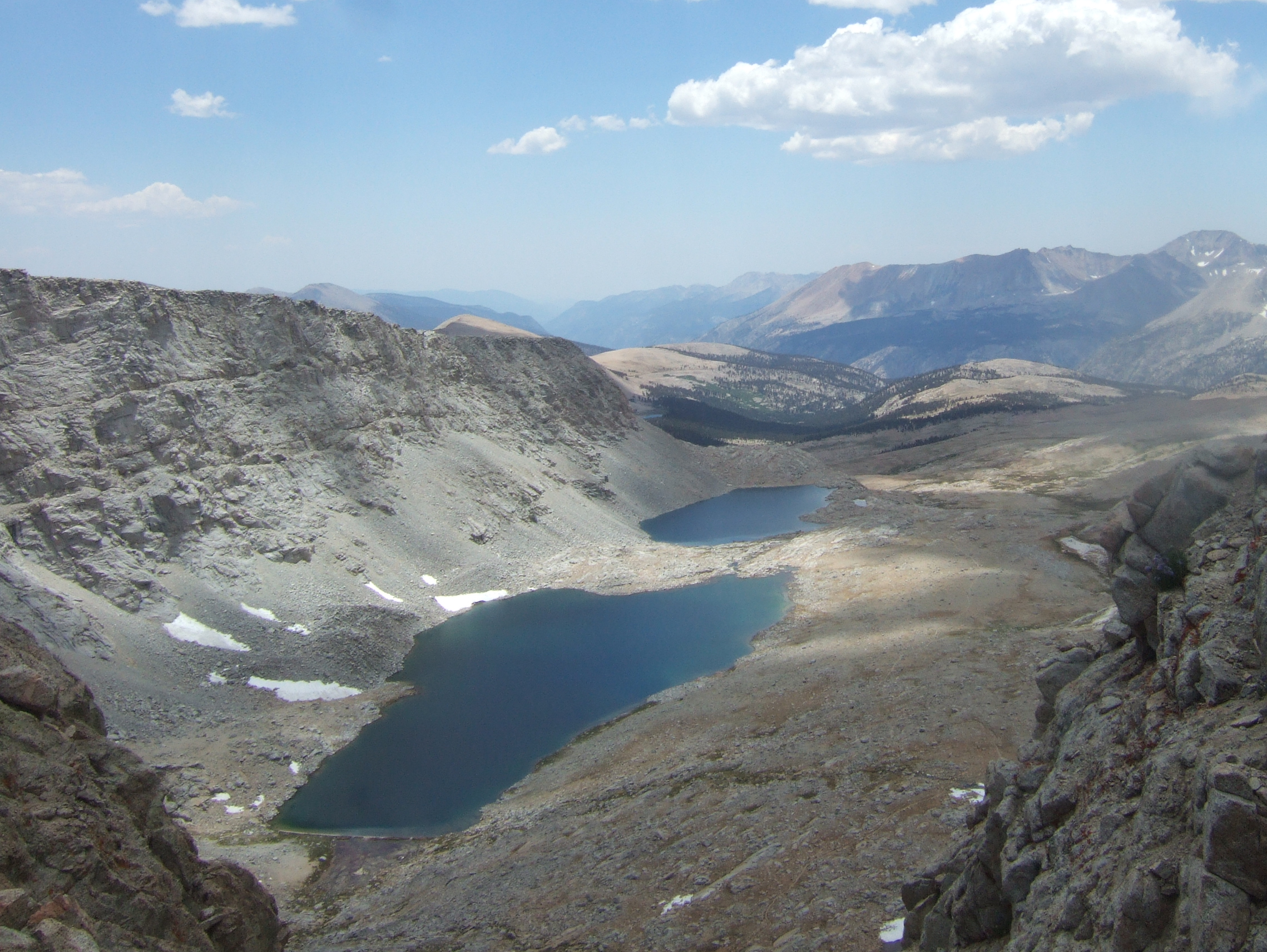
Forester Pass

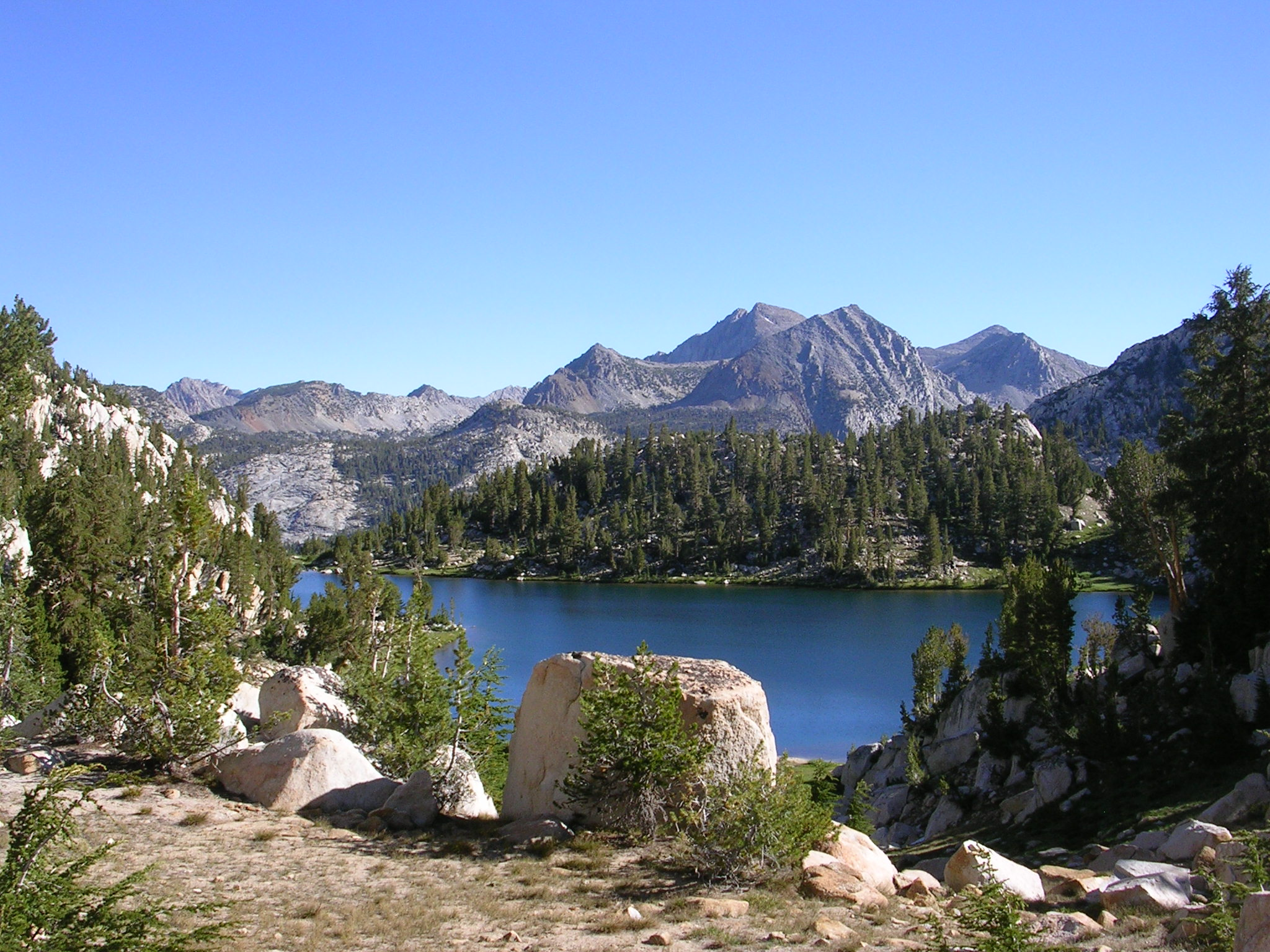
John Muir Wilderness

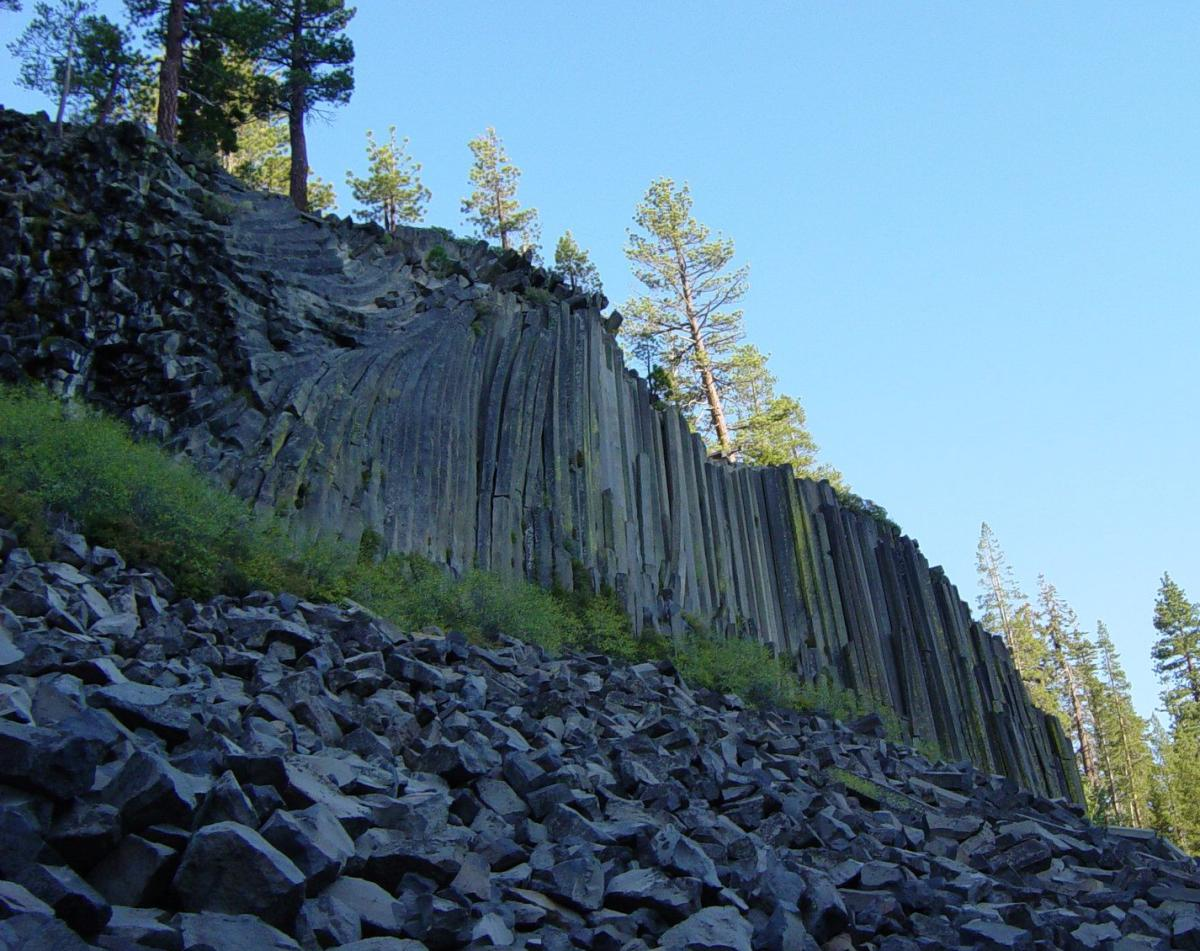
Devils Postpile National Monument

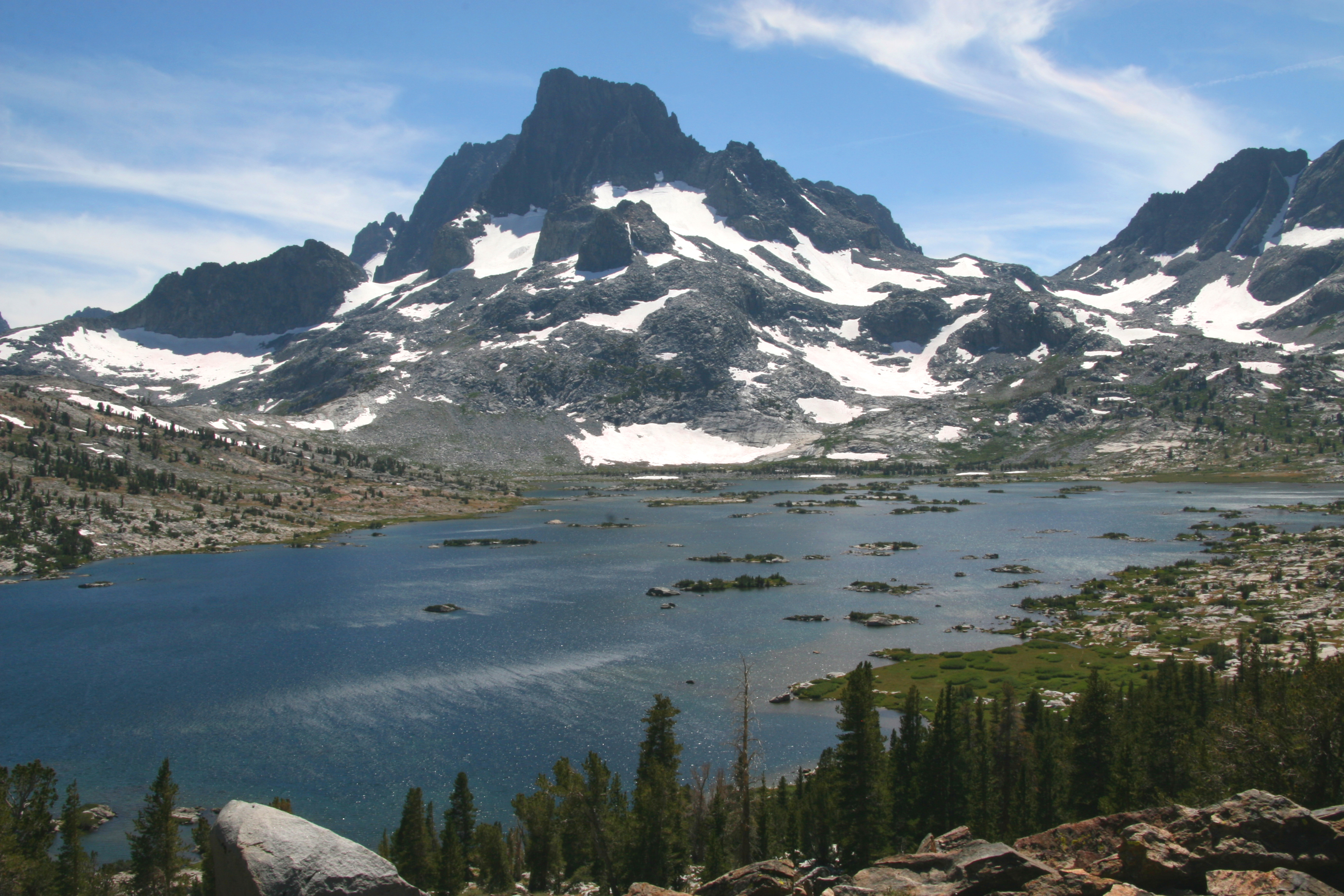
Ansel Adams Wilderness

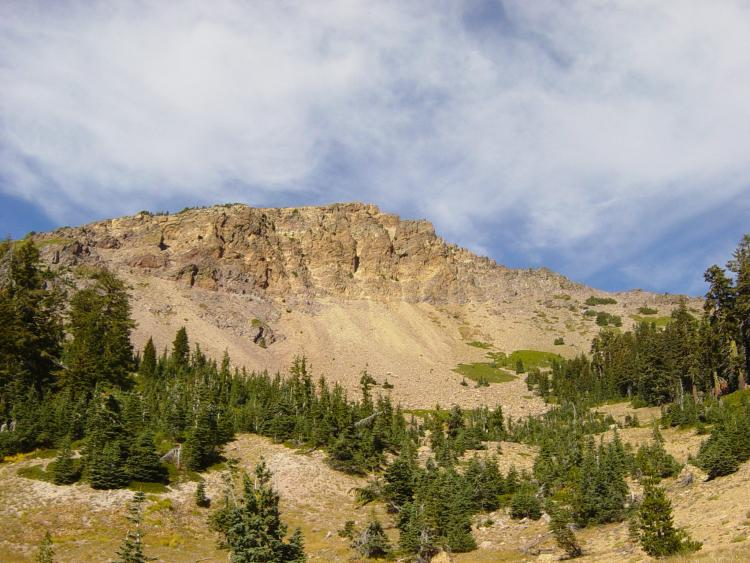
Lassen Volcanic National Park

Klamath Mountains, Russian Wilderness

- Campo, California, near the trail's southern terminus at the Mexico–United States border
- Lake Morena
- Anza-Borrego Desert State Park (41)
- Eagle Rock (near Warner Springs)
- Cleveland National Forest (40)
- Crystal Lake Recreation Area
  - Windy Gap Trail (Angeles National Forest)
- Mount San Jacinto State Park (39)
- San Gorgonio Pass and Interstate 10 near Cabazon
- Big Bear Lake (37)
- Cajon Pass (36)
- Angeles National Forest (35)
- Vasquez Rocks
- Agua Dulce
- Tehachapi Pass
- Walker Pass
- Owens Peak Wilderness (34)
- South Sierra Wilderness (34)
- Golden Trout Wilderness (34)
- Kings Canyon National Park (33)
  - Forester Pass, highest point on the trail
- John Muir Wilderness (31)
- Ansel Adams Wilderness (30)
  - Devils Postpile National Monument
- Yosemite National Park (29)
  - Tuolumne Meadows
- Sonora Pass, Ebbetts Pass, Carson Pass
- Desolation Wilderness
- Lassen National Forest (22)
  - Lassen Volcanic National Park (23)
- McArthur-Burney Falls Memorial State Park (21)
- Shasta-Trinity National Forest (19)
  - Castle Crags Wilderness (20)
- Klamath Mountains
  - Trinity Alps Wilderness
  - Russian Wilderness
  - Marble Mountain Wilderness

=== Oregon ===
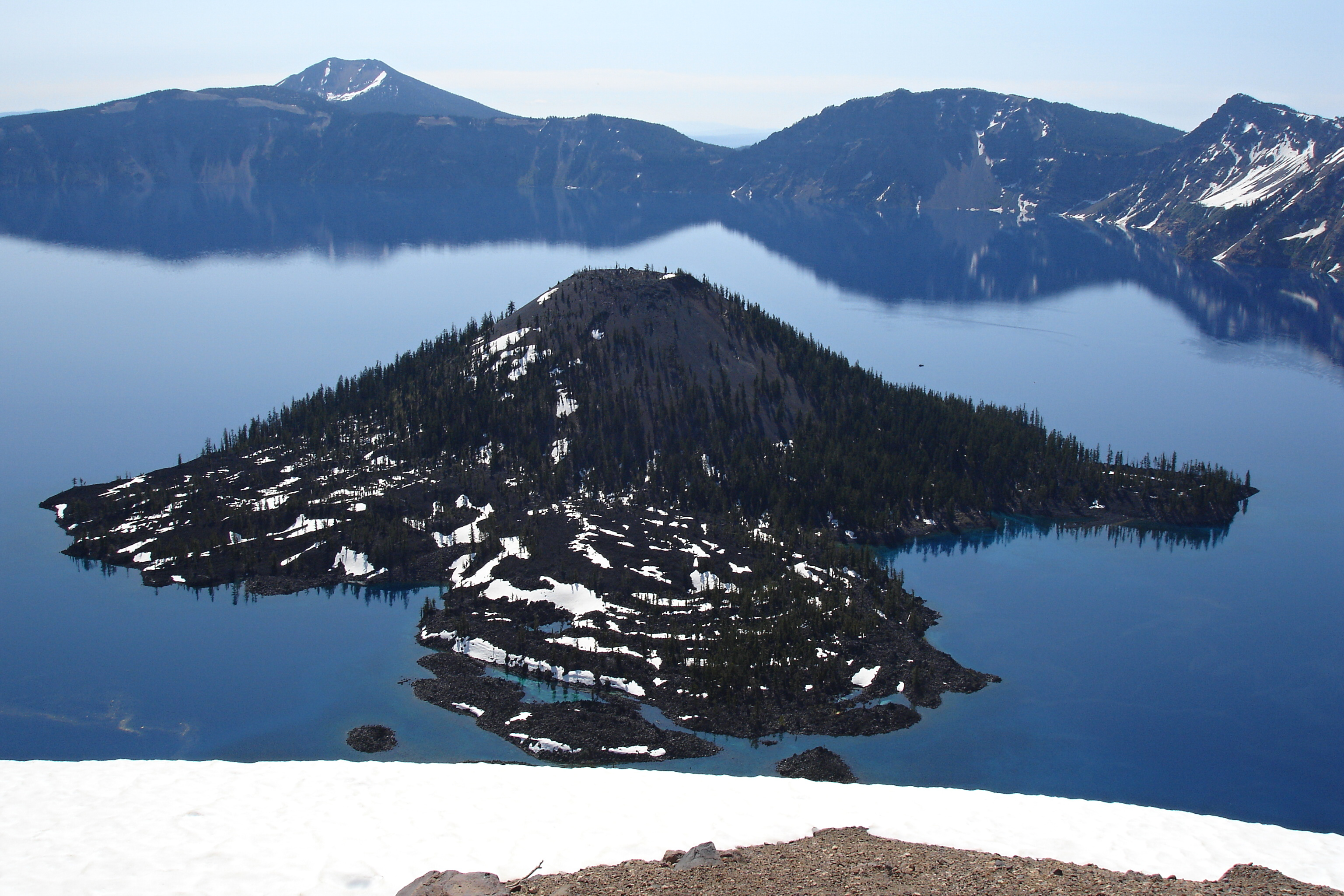
Crater Lake National Park

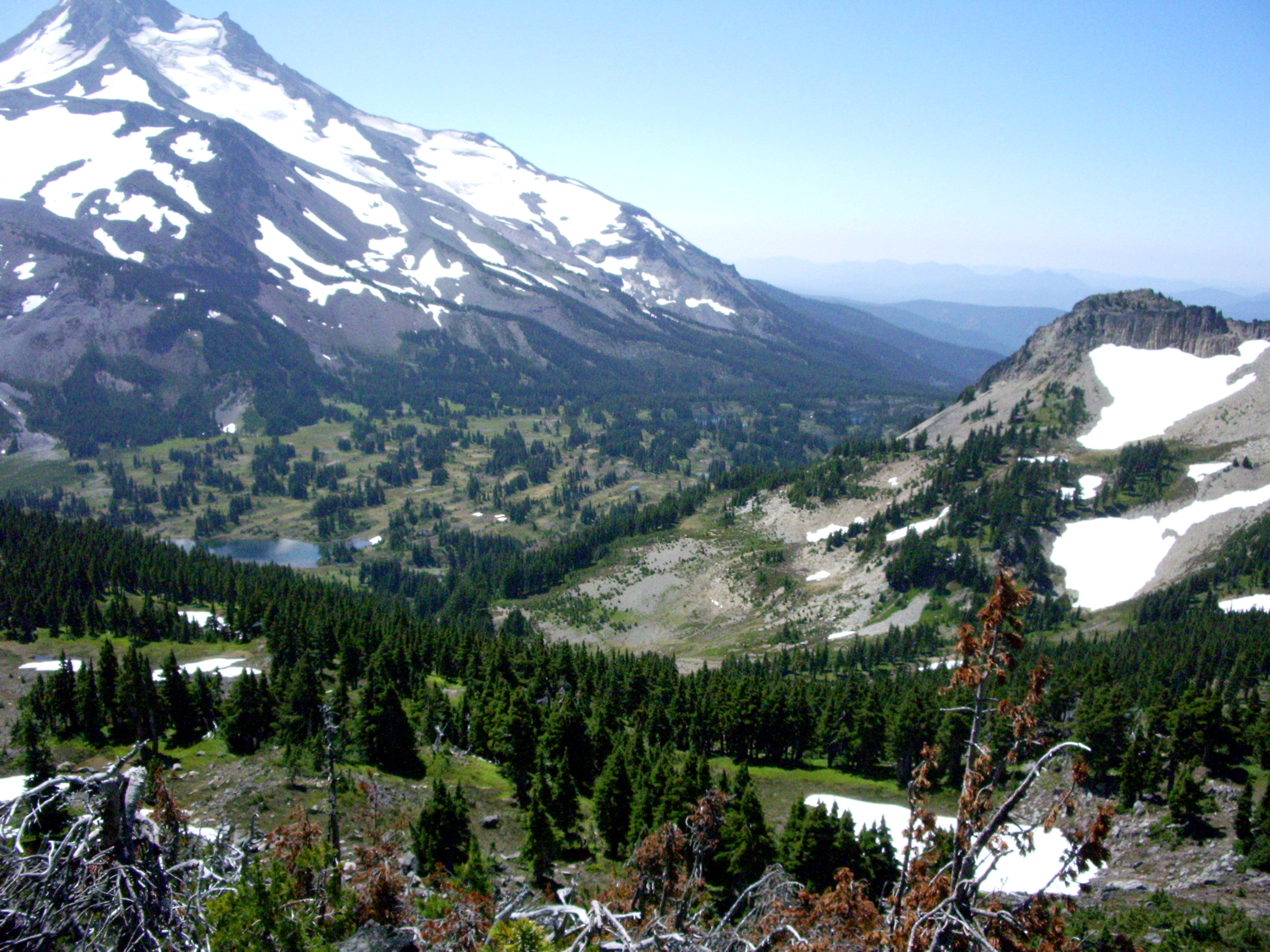
Mount Jefferson and Mount Jefferson Wilderness

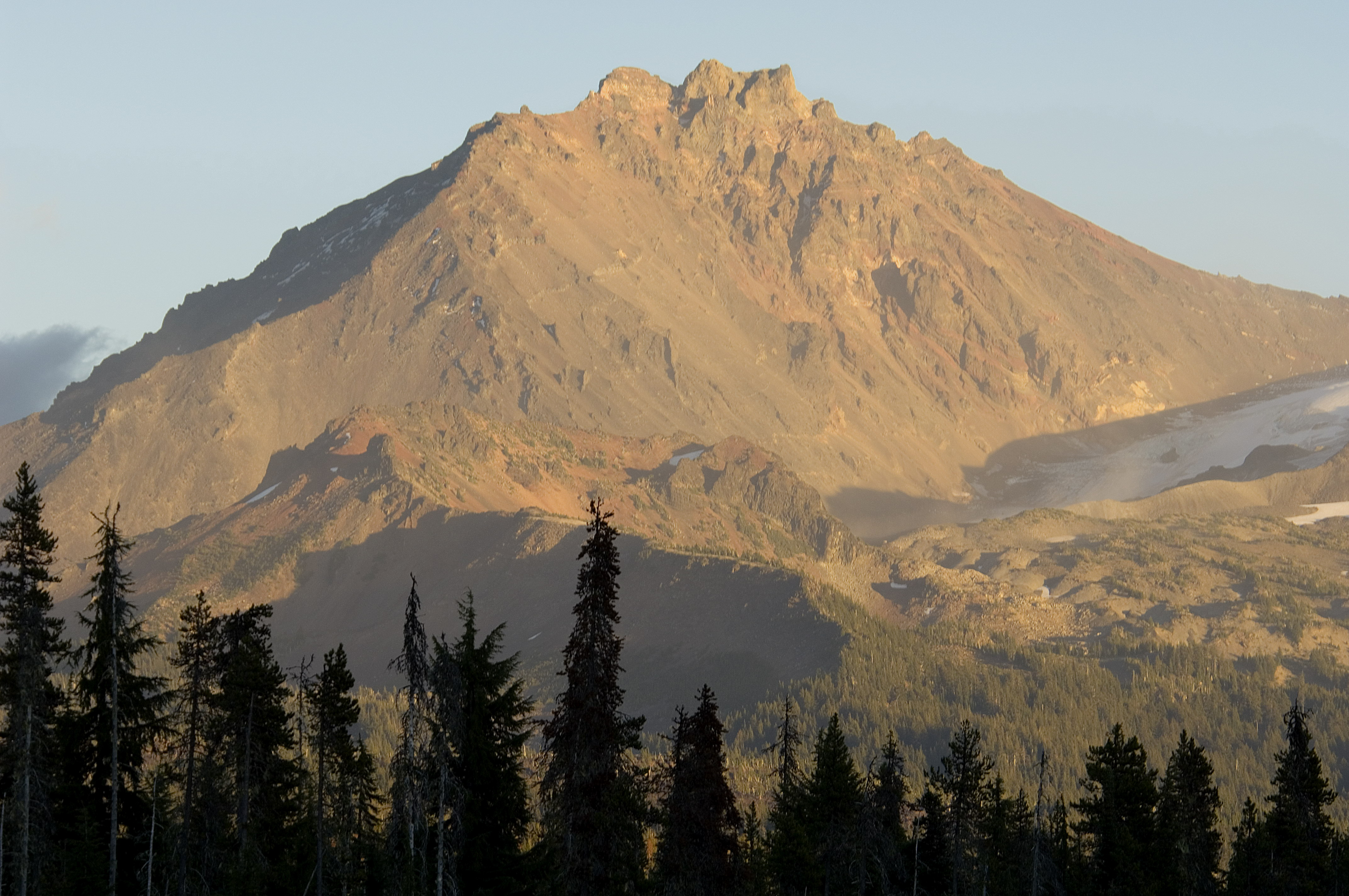
North Sister

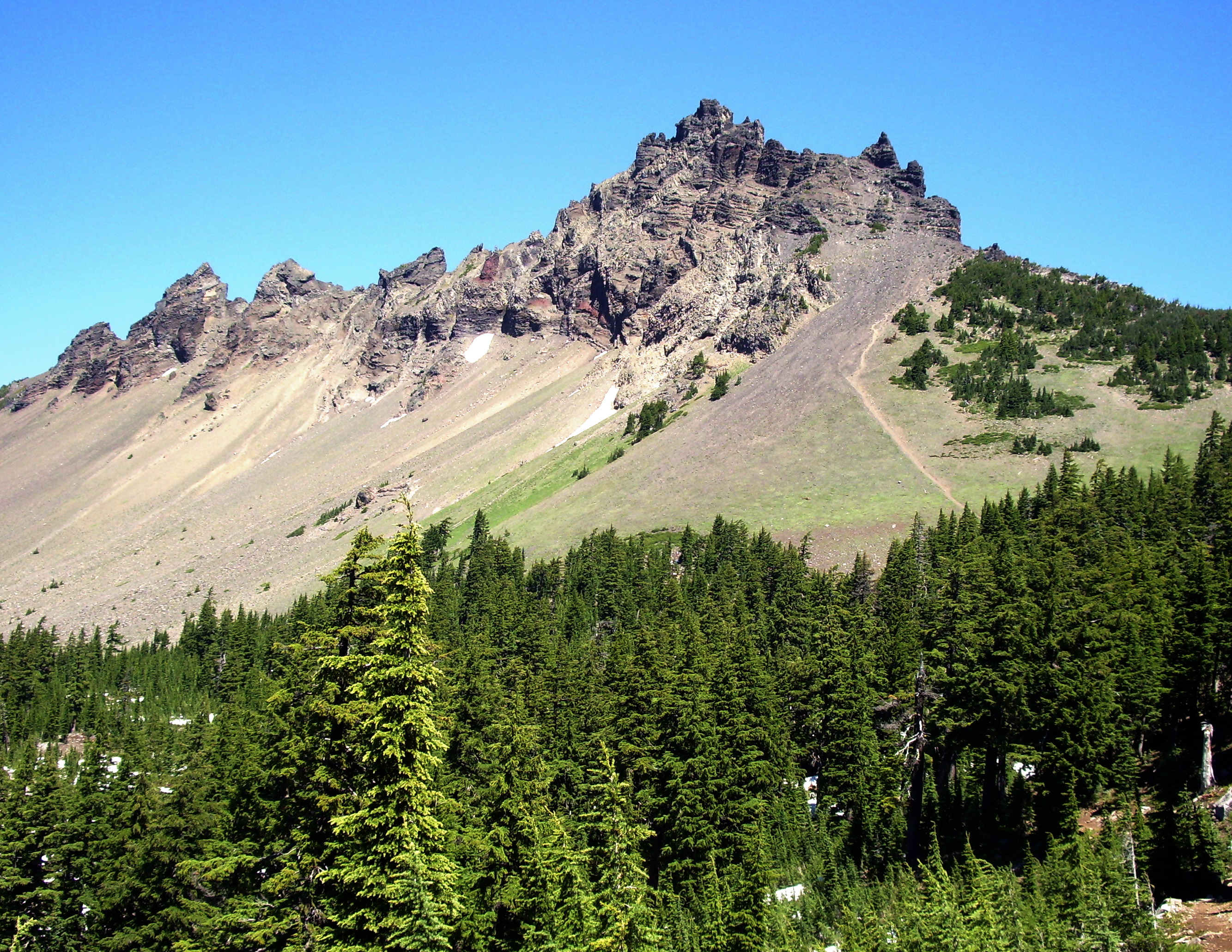
Three Fingered Jack

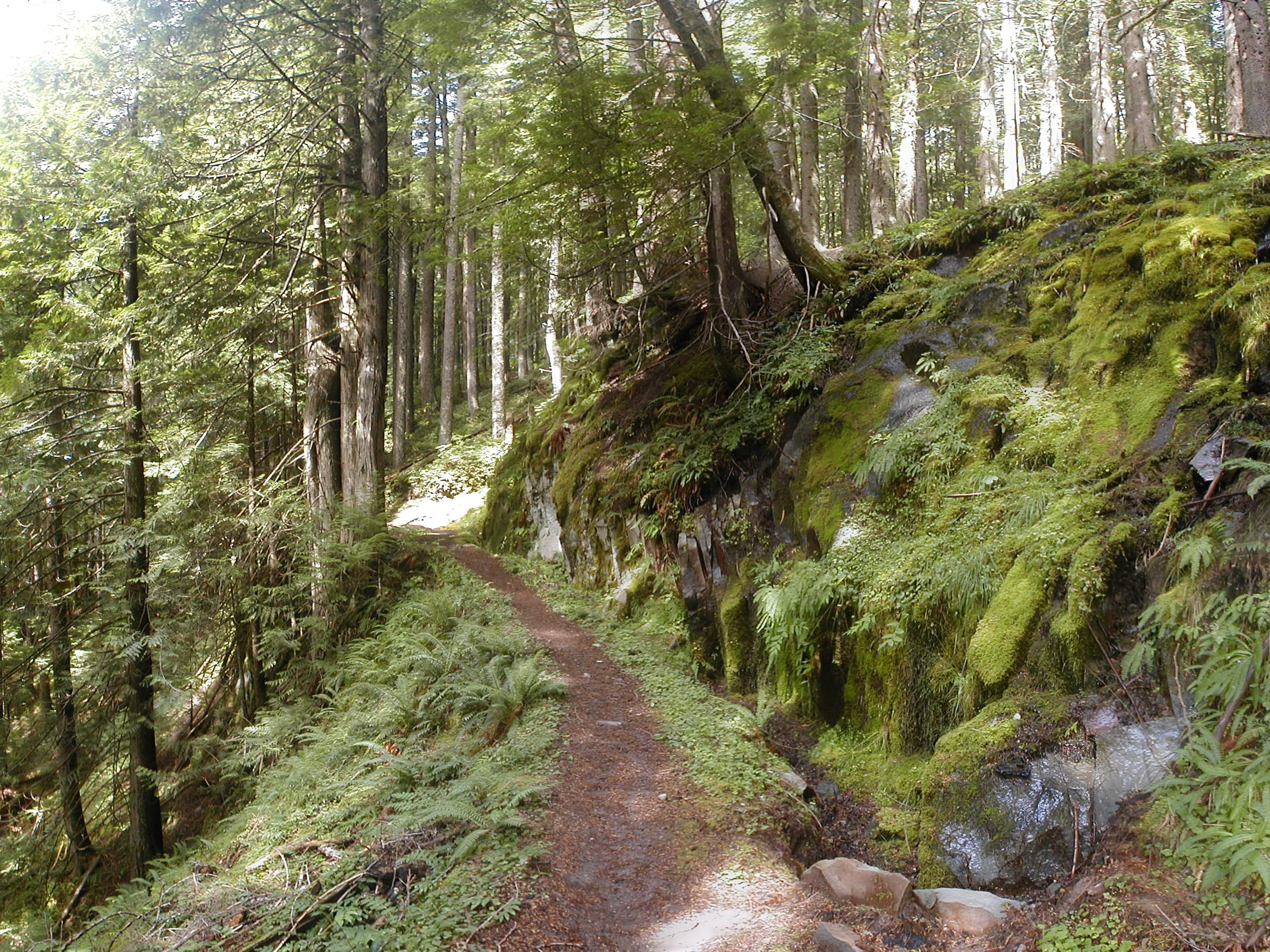
Mount Hood Wilderness

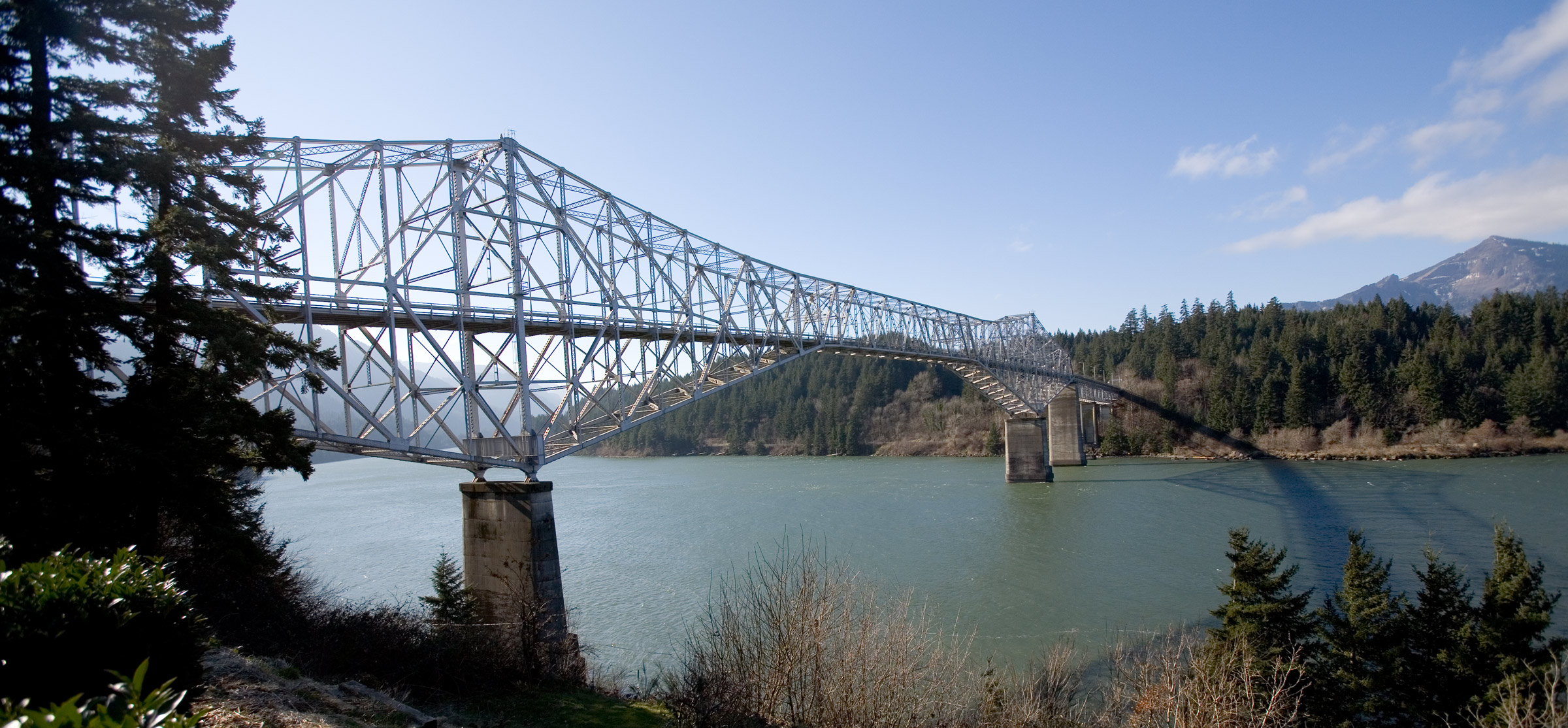
Bridge of the Gods

- Cascade–Siskiyou National Monument (17)
- Rogue River National Forest (16) and Winema National Forest (14)
  - Sky Lakes Wilderness
- Crater Lake National Park (15)
  - Crater Lake
- Umpqua National Forest (13)
  - Mount Thielsen
- Willamette National Forest (11) and Deschutes National Forest (12)
  - Diamond Peak Wilderness
  - Waldo Lake
  - Three Sisters Wilderness
  - Dee Wright Observatory and McKenzie Pass
  - Mount Washington Wilderness
  - Mount Jefferson Wilderness
- Mount Hood National Forest (9)
  - Olallie Scenic Area
  - Warm Springs Indian Reservation (10)
  - Timberline Lodge
  - Mount Hood Wilderness
    - Lolo Pass
- Columbia River Gorge National Scenic Area (8)
  - Mark O. Hatfield Wilderness (formerly the Columbia Wilderness)
  - Cascade Locks, Oregon, lowest point on the trail
  - Bridge of the Gods (links Oregon and Washington, crossing the Columbia River)

=== Washington ===
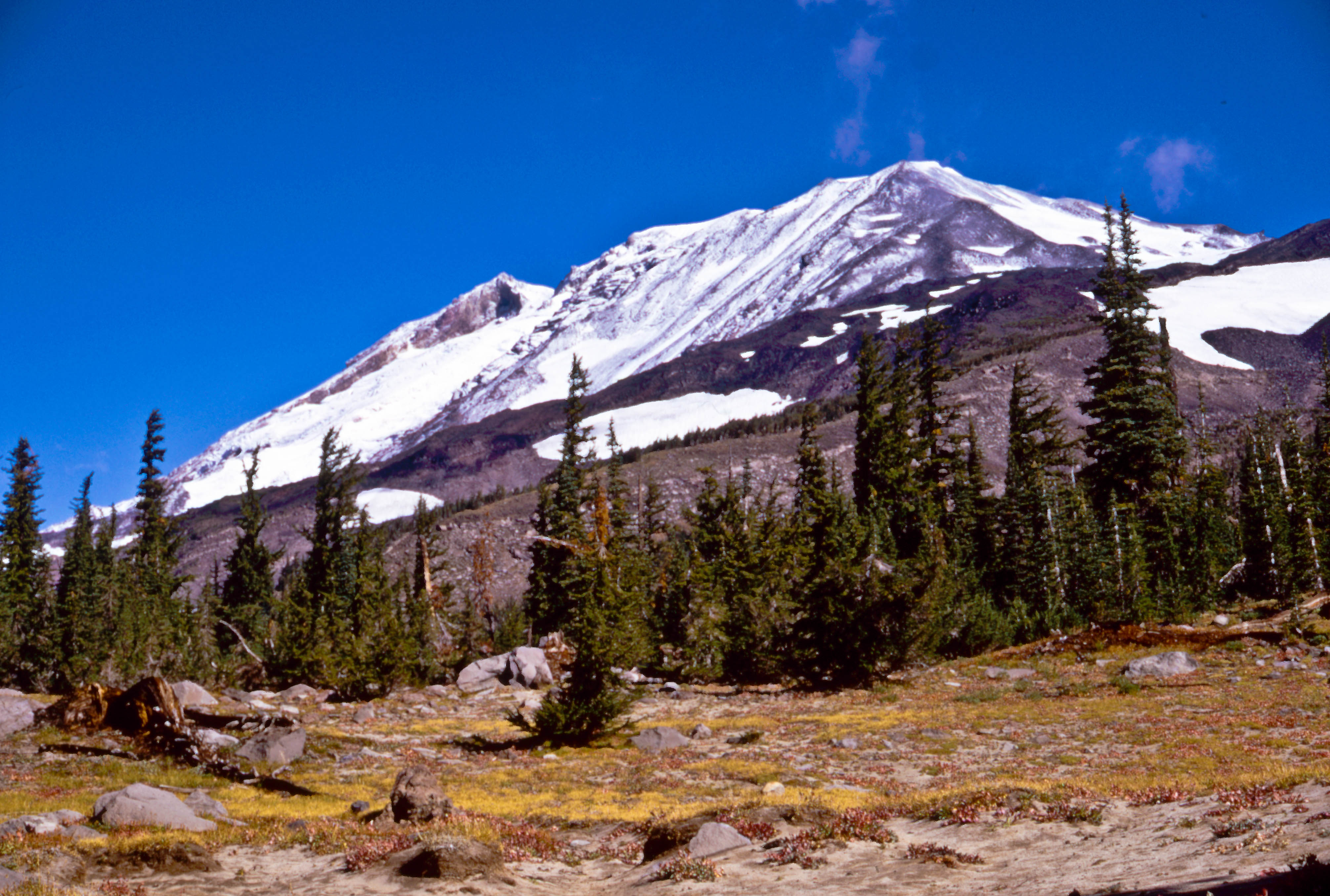
Mount Adams

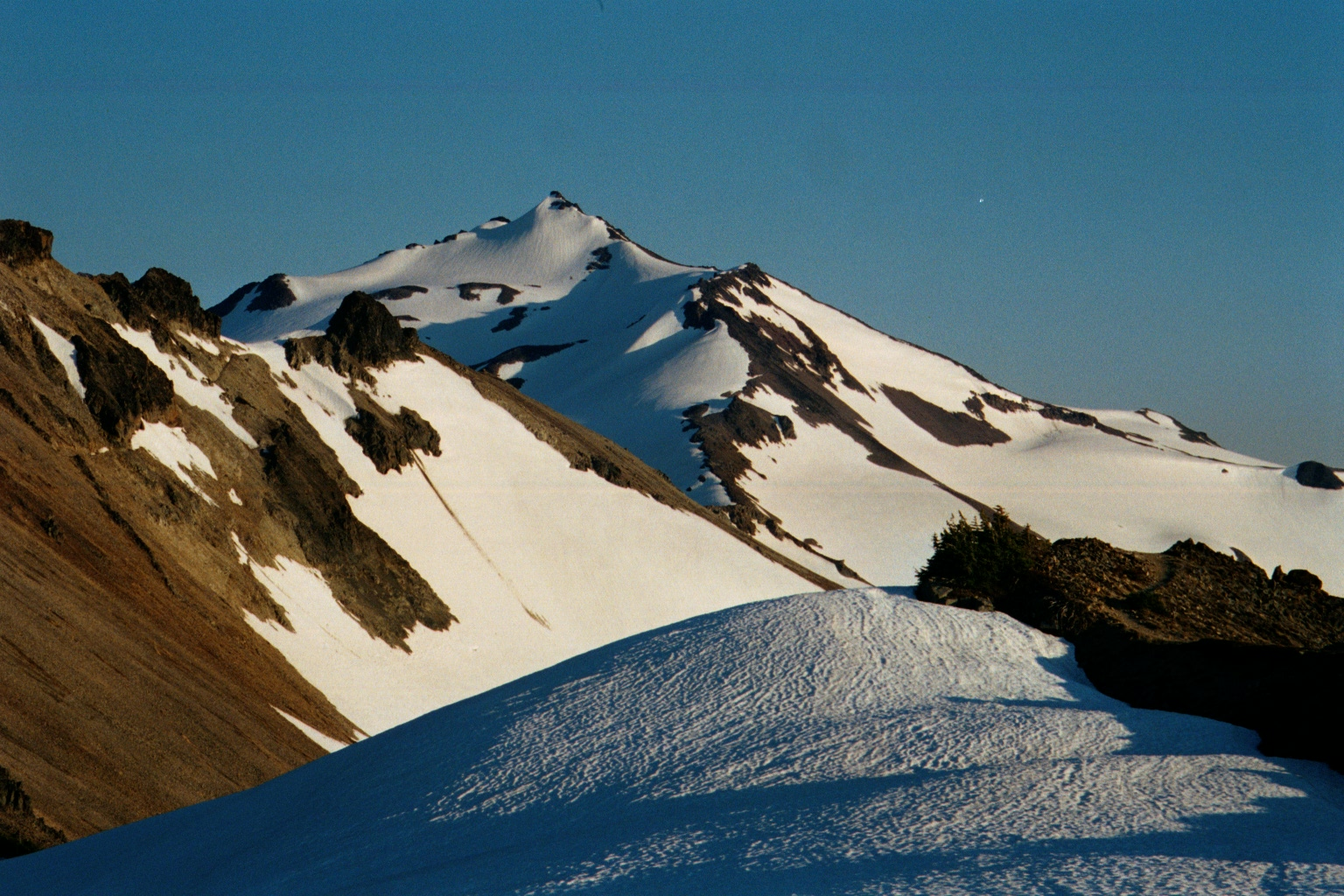
Goat Rocks Wilderness

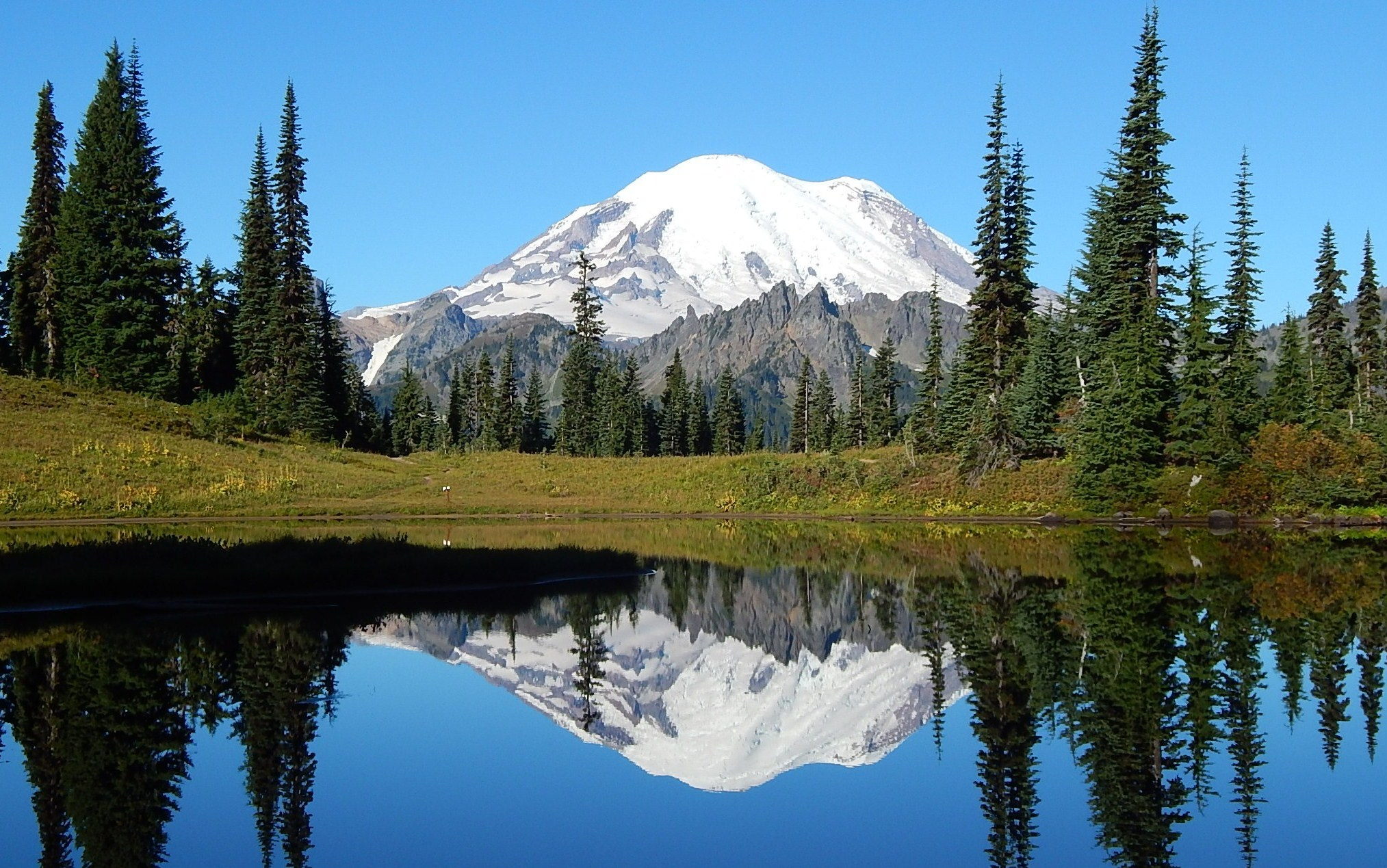
Mount Rainier

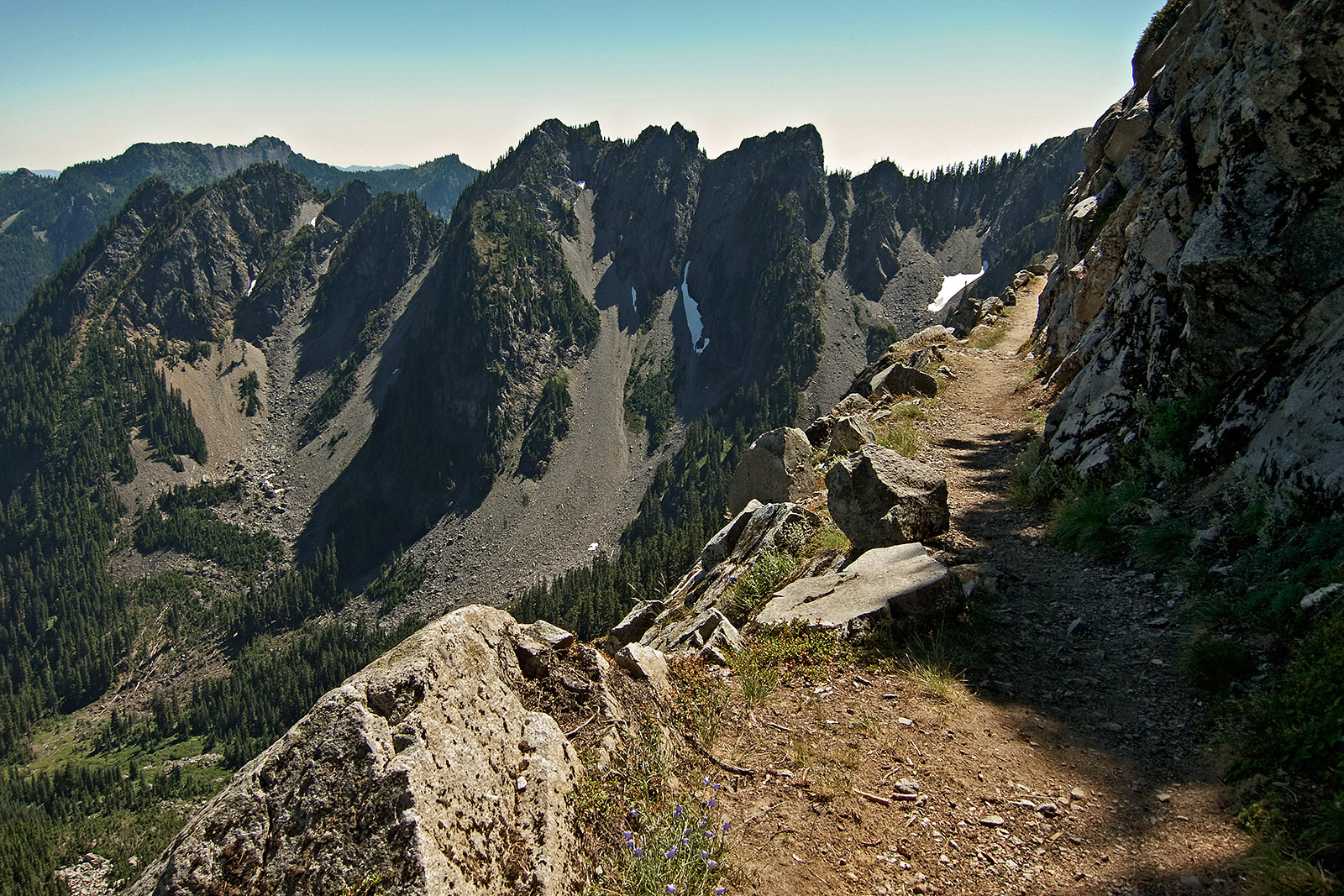
Kendall Katwalk

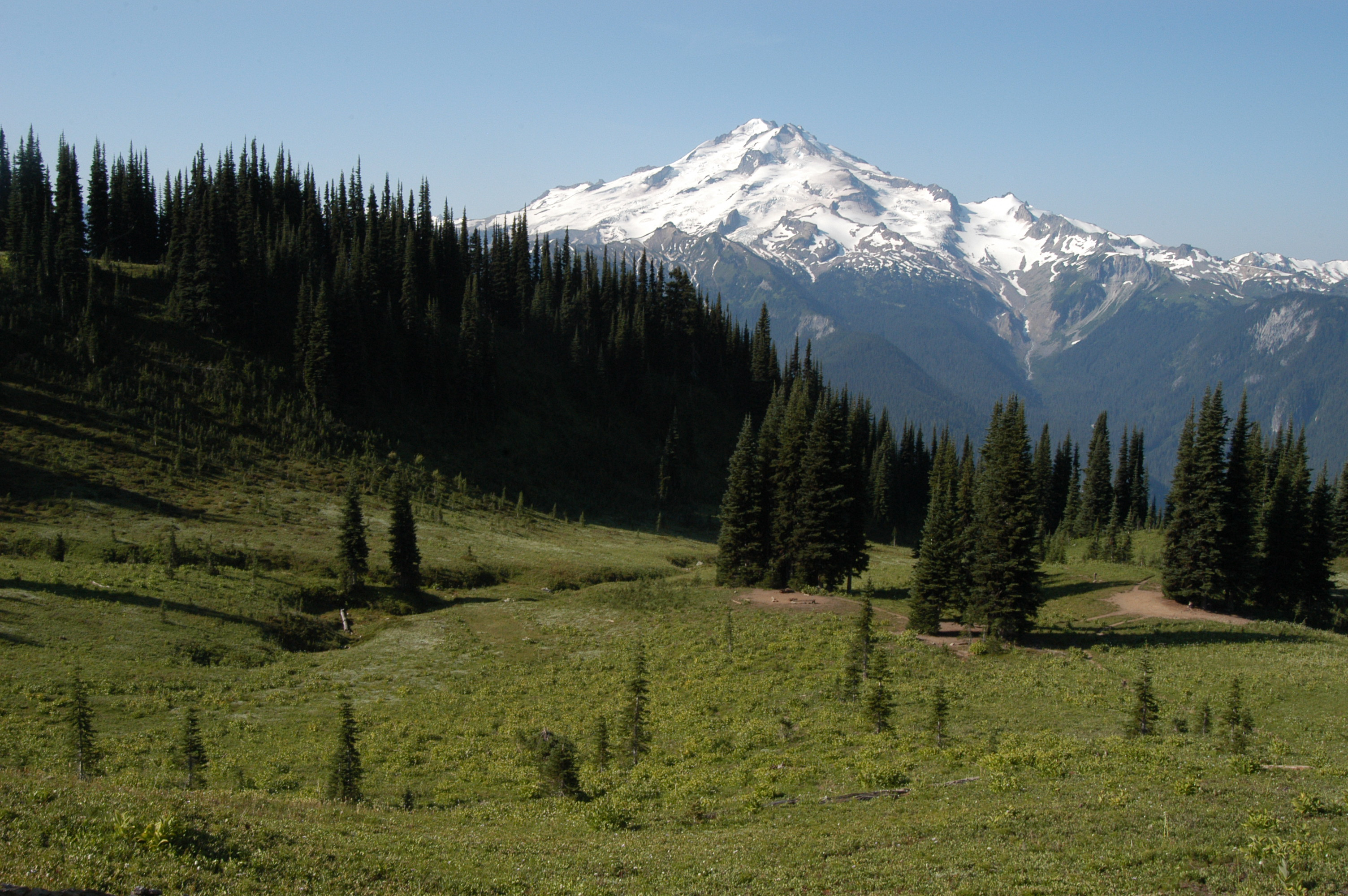
Glacier Peak Wilderness

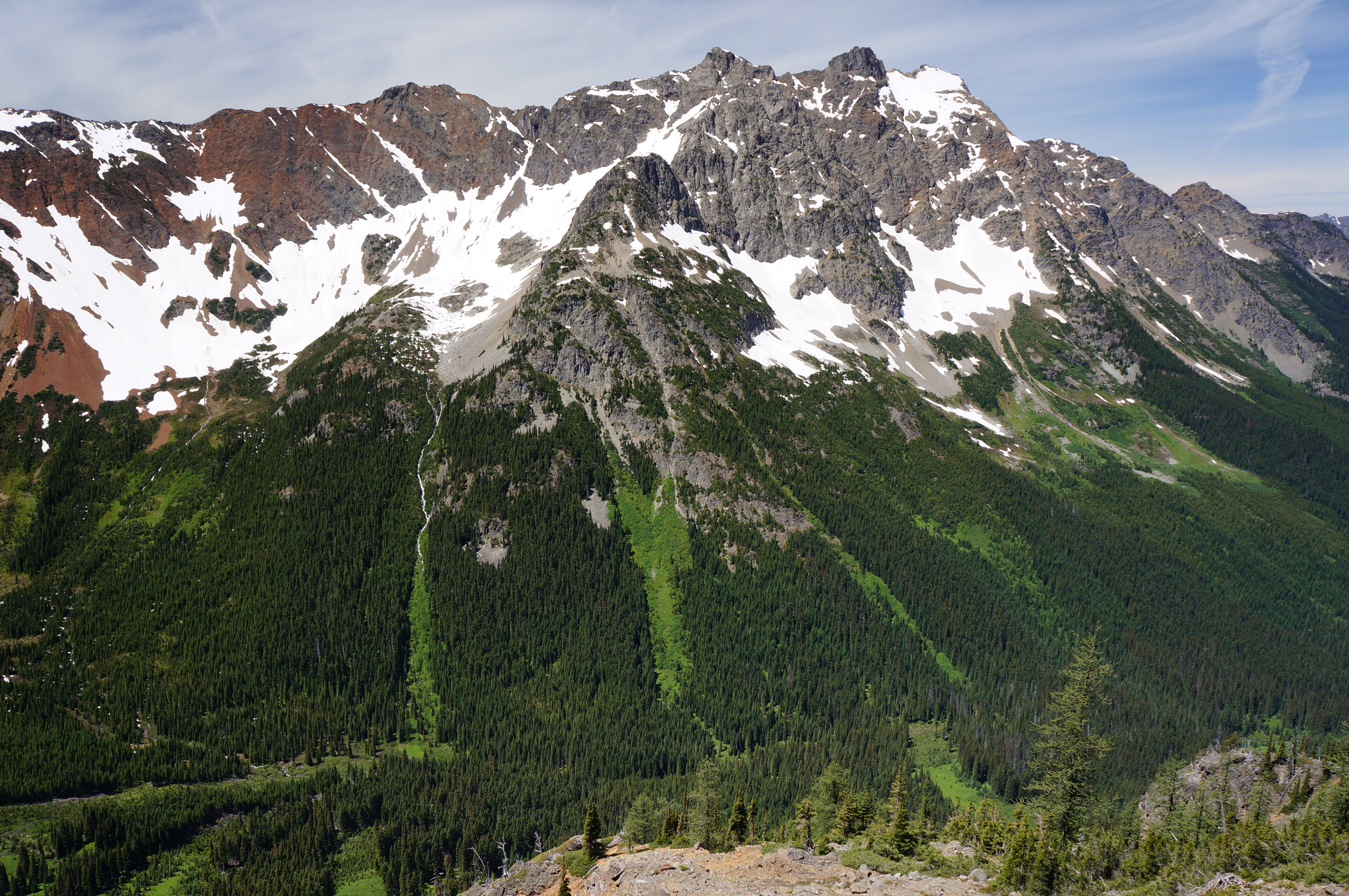
Okanogan–Wenatchee National Forest

- Gifford Pinchot National Forest (7)
  - Indian Heaven Wilderness
  - Mount Adams Wilderness
    - Mount Adams
  - Goat Rocks Wilderness
    - Old Snowy Mountain
  - White Pass
- Mount Rainier National Park (6)
  - Chinook Pass
- Mount Baker-Snoqualmie National Forest (5)
  - Norse Peak Wilderness
  - Alpine Lakes Wilderness
    - Kendall Katwalk
  - Henry M. Jackson Wilderness
  - Glacier Peak Wilderness
    - Glacier Peak
- Snoqualmie Pass
- Stevens Pass
- Lake Chelan National Recreation Area
  - Stehekin, Washington, last town along the trail, 10 miles (16 km) from PCT by NPS bus
- North Cascades National Park (2)
- Okanogan–Wenatchee National Forest (3)
- Pacific Northwest National Scenic Trail
- Boundary Monument 78, at the Canada–United States border

=== British Columbia, Canada ===
- E. C. Manning Provincial Park (1), the northern terminus of the trail. Until 2025, northbound hikers with a Canada PCT Entry Permit were allowed to cross the border to exit at nearby Manning Park Resort. The Canadian Border Services Agency discontinued this program in late January 2025.

== Location coordinates ==
PCT route maps are on Google Maps, some with some points of interest.

Point	Coordinates (links to map & photo sources)	Notes
United States – Mexico border	32.5898°N 116.4685°W	
Forester Pass	36.6941°N 118.3720°W	highest point
Midpoint	40.2132°N 121.3546°W	
Oregon – California border	42.0038°N 122.9100°W	
Columbia River (Washington – Oregon border)	45.6543°N 121.9179°W	lowest point
Canada – United States border	49.0000°N 120.7987°W	

== See also ==
Other Triple Crown trails

- Appalachian Trail
- Continental Divide Trail

Connected National Scenic Trail

- Pacific Northwest Trail

Connected National Historic Trails

- California Trail
- Juan Bautista de Anza National Historic Trail
- Lewis and Clark National Historic Trail
- Old Spanish Trail
- Oregon Trail
- Pony Express National Historic Trail

Connected U.S. long-distance trails

- High Sierra Trail
- John Muir Trail
- Mark O. Hatfield Memorial Trail
- Oregon Skyline Trail
- Tahoe–Yosemite Trail
- Tahoe Rim Trail
- Timberline Trail

Long-distance routes

- Sierra High Route
