= Edward B. Garvey =

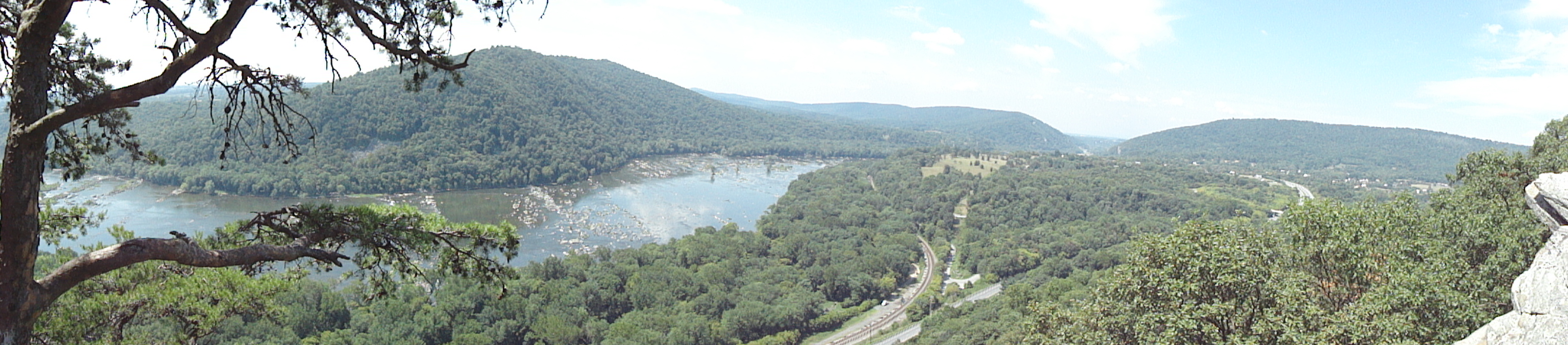
Panoramic view of the Potomac River taken from Weverton Cliffs looking west/southwest

Edward B. Garvey (November 13, 1914 – September 20, 1999) thru-hiked the Appalachian Trail in 1970 and in 1971 published a book about his adventure, Appalachian Hiker, that raised awareness of thru-hiking.

Garvey was an auditor for the Soil Conservation Service and chief financial officer for the National Science Foundation and retired in 1969. He lived in the Washington, D.C., area from the 1940s.

He helped build and maintain the Appalachian Trail and served as a president of the Potomac Appalachian Trail Club as well as on the Appalachian Trail Conference board of managers and was a member of the Appalachian Long Distance Hikers Association.

He also worked to pass state and federal legislation including the National Trails System Act of 1968 and its 1978 amendments.

In 1996, the Wilderness Society and the Izaak Walton League honored him with the American Land Hero Award for his efforts to protect the Appalachian Trail.

On June 17, 2011, he was inducted into the Appalachian Trail Hall of Fame at the Appalachian Trail Museum as a charter member.

The Ed Garvey Memorial Shelter on the Appalachian Trail at Weverton Cliffs at Weverton, Maryland, near Harpers Ferry, West Virginia, was built and named in his honor.

== See also ==
- Citadel spread

== Bibliography ==
- Appalachian Hiker: Adventure of a Lifetime - 1971
- Hiking Trails in the Mid-Atlantic States - 1976
- The New Appalachian Trail (Appalachian Hiker) - 1997
