= Appalachian Trail Museum =

Museum in the United States

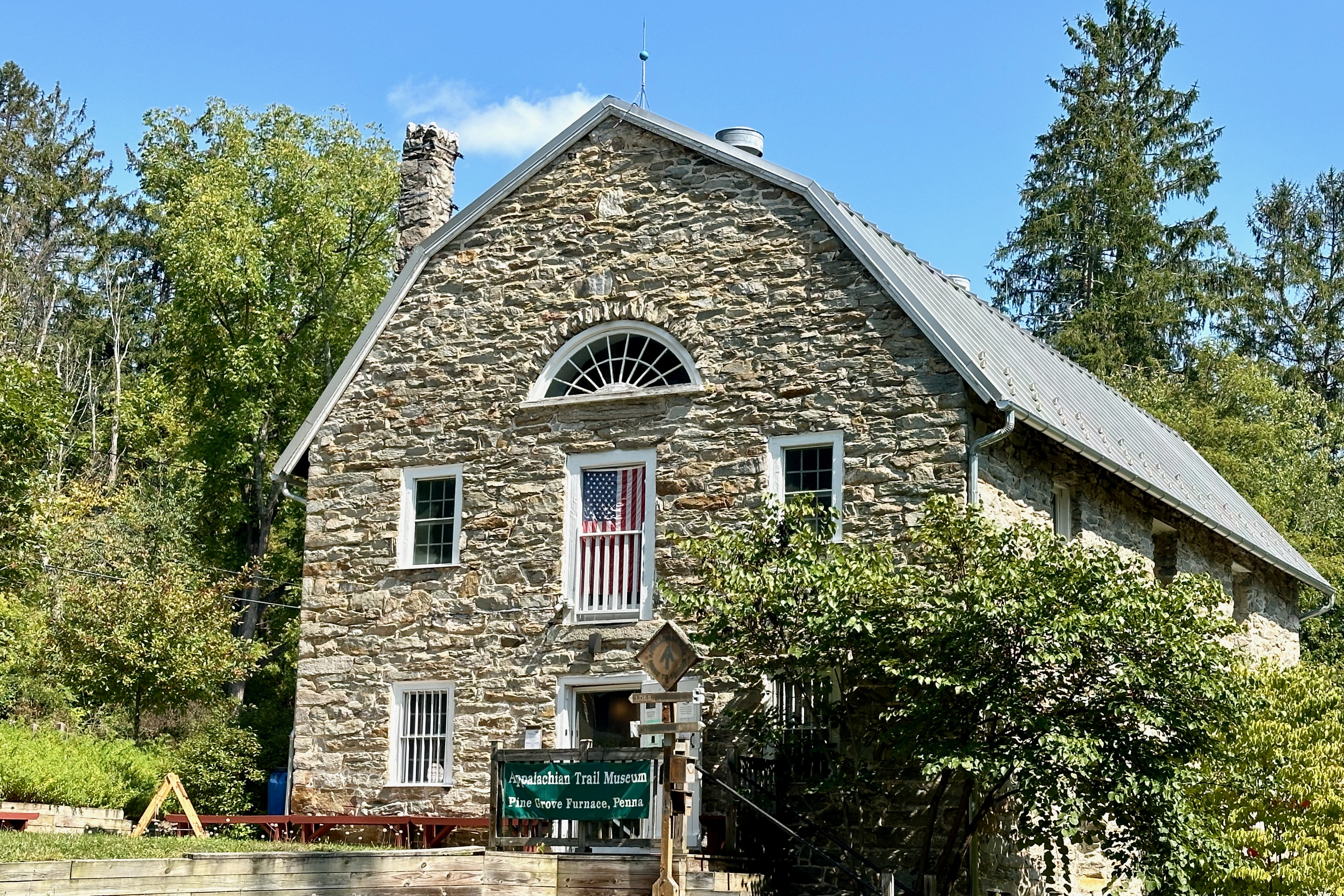
- The museum in 2024
- Established: 2010
- Location: Pine Grove Furnace State Park, Pennsylvania
- Coordinates: 40°01′57″N 77°18′20″W

The Appalachian Trail Museum is located in Pine Grove Furnace State Park near Gardners, Pennsylvania, United States, and commemorates the builders, maintainers and hikers of the Appalachian Trail, including those in the Appalachian Trail Hall of Fame. Features include a 1959 trail shelter from Peters Mountain built by Earl Shaffer, the first A.T. thru-hiker, vintage hiking and trail building equipment, historic A.T. signs, A.T. displays on permanent loan from the Smithsonian Institution, a recreation of A.T. founder Benton MacKaye's Sky Parlor office and a display on the National Trails System Act of 1968. The museum also has an extensive research library.

== History ==
The museum was conceived in 1998 and is located in the Old Mill Building, a stone gristmill building of the former Pine Grove Iron Works. It is the first museum in the United States dedicated to a hiking trail. The museum opened in 2010.

The museum is open each year from early April to late October. Parking is available adjacent to the Furnace Stack Picnic Pavilion. Admission is free. The museum also operates the Ironmaster's Mansion Hostel, a hostel and special events venue located near the midpoint of the Appalachian Trail just a few hundred yards from the museum.

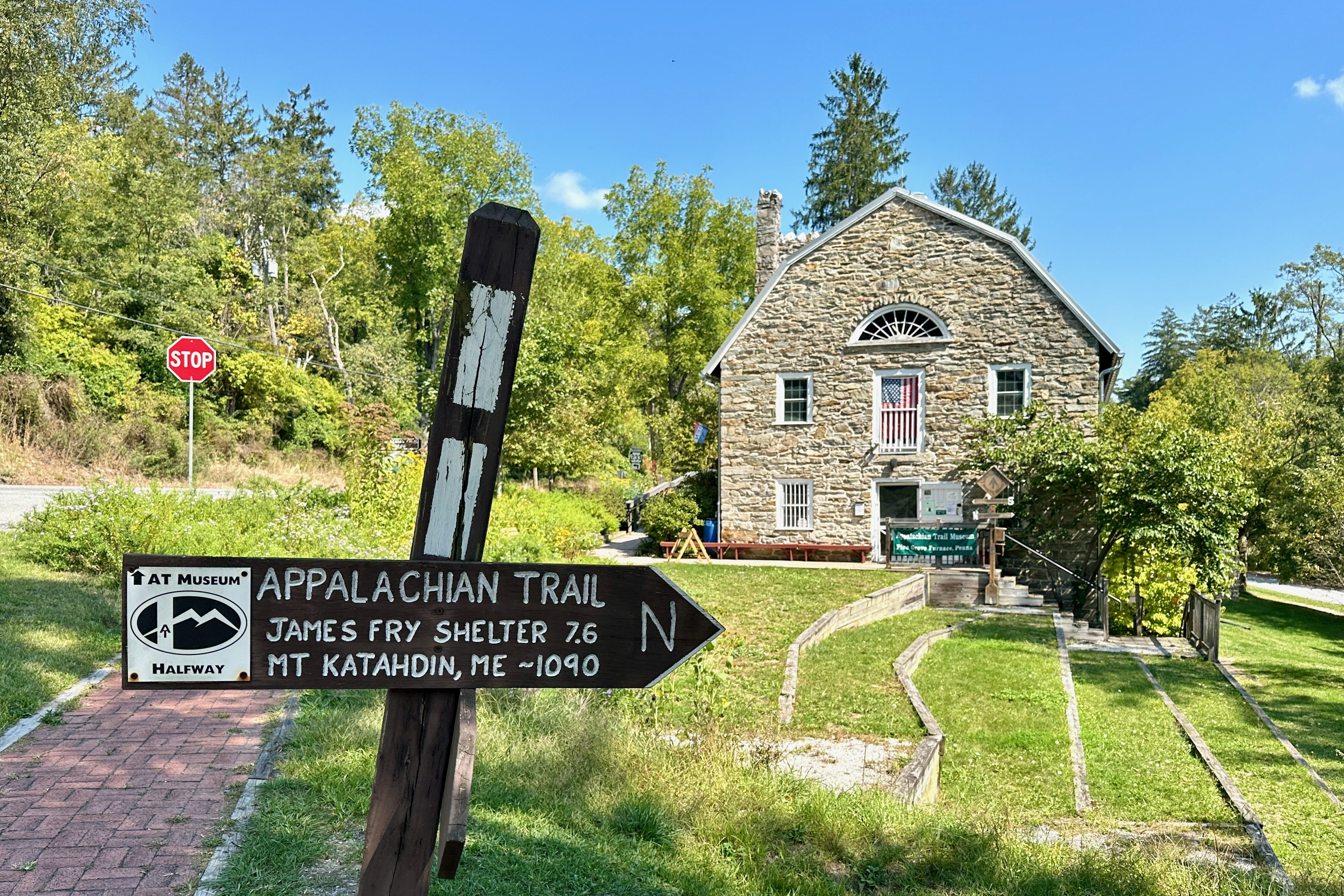
Appalachian Trail passing the museum

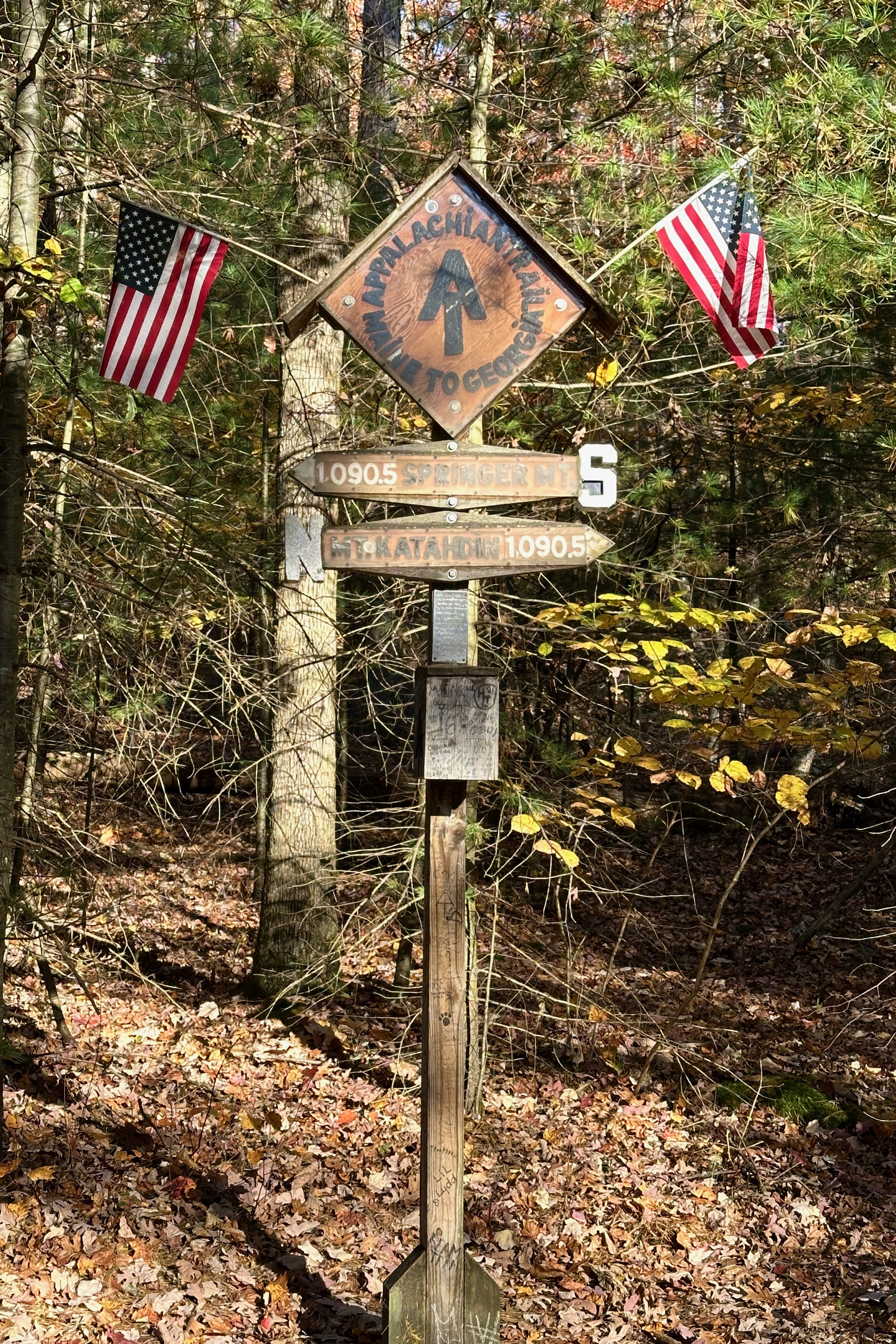
Ceremonial halfway marker

== Appalachian Trail Hall of Fame ==
The Appalachian Trail Hall of Fame was established by the museum in 2011. Each year the museum's Hall of Fame selection committee selects one or more persons to be inducted into the Hall of Fame. Nominations for inclusion are accepted each year using an online survey site. Those eligible for inclusion include anyone who has made an exceptional and positive contribution to the Appalachian Trail or Appalachian Trail Community. Each year's honorees are honored at a Hall of Fame Banquet or Induction. The Museum has established a Hall of Fame Room in the Ironmaster's Mansion Hostel to commemorate the Hall Inductees. The Museum has established a Hall of Fame Room in the Ironmaster's Mansion to honor the Hall of Fame Inductees. The Room includes commemorative plaques for each Class and a collection of custom made hiking sticks honoring the Inductees.

The 2011 Charter Class included Myron Avery, Gene Espy, Ed Garvey, Benton MacKaye, Arthur Perkins and Earl Shaffer.

The 2012 Class included Emma Rowena "Grandma" Gatewood, David A. Richie, J. Frank Schairer, Jean Stephenson and William Adams Welch.

The 2013 Class included Ruth Blackburn, David Field, David Sherman, David Startzell and Everett (Eddie) Stone.

The 2014 Class included A. Rufus Morgan, Charles R. "Chuck" Rinaldi, Clarence S. Stein and Pamela Underhill.

The 2015 class included Nestell K. "Ned" Anderson, Margaret Drummond, Stanley A. Murray and Raymond H. Torrey.

The 2016 class was Maurice Forrester, Horace Kephart, Larry Luxenberg and Henry "Arch" Nichols.

The 2017 class included Harlean James, Charles Parry, Mildred Norman "Peace Pilgrim" Ryder and Matilda "Tillie" Wood.

The 2018 class included William "Bill" Kemsley, Jr., Elizabeth Levers, George Masa and Robert "Bob" Peoples.

The 2019 class included M. Jean Van Gilder Cashin, Paul M. Fink, Donald T. King and Robert T. Proudman.

The 2020 class consisted of Chris Brunton, Warren Doyle, Thurston Griggs and Walkin' Jim Stoltz.

The 2021 class included Harvey Benjamin Broome, Stephen Clark, Thomas Johnson and Marianne Skeen.

The 2022 class was Jim & Molly Denton, JoAnn & Paul Dolan, Laurie Potteiger and Tom Speaks.

The 2023 class included M.J. Eberhart, Lester Kenway, Brian B. King and Harry Rentschler.

The 2024 class is Edward B. Ballard, Arno Cammerer, Raymond Hunt and Ronald S. Rosen.

== See also ==
- Appalachian Long Distance Hikers Association
- Appalachian Trail Conservancy
