= Nestell Kipp Anderson =

American farmer, spearheaded Appalachian Trail in Connecticut

Nestell Kipp "Ned" Anderson (1885–1967) was an American farmer who spearheaded Connecticut's leg of the Appalachian Trail, which currently runs for 50 miles through the northwest corner of the state. In addition to creating and maintaining other area trails for the Connecticut Forest & Park's (CFPA) Blue-Blazed Trail System, he also organized Sherman, Connecticut's first Boy Scout troop in 1931, as well as the Housatonic Trail Club in 1932, for amateur and avid hikers.

== History ==
While hiking in 1929, Ned Anderson met Judge Arthur Perkins, a member of CFPA's Connecticut's Blue Blazed Trails Committee, who introduced Anderson to Myron Avery. These two men were drumming up interest in Benton MacKaye's vision of a 2,000-mile contiguous footpath from Maine to Georgia—The Appalachian Trail. Most people with whom they met were interested but few were committing to it; Anderson took an immediate interest.

Taking on dual roles as Chairman of CFPA's Blue Blazed Trails' Housatonic Section (officially – 1932), and as a member of the Appalachian Trail Conference's (ATC—now Appalachian Trail Conservancy) Board of Managers (he was the ATC's 49th member), Ned mapped and cleared, cut, hacked, and blazed the state's trail from Dog Tail Corners in Webatuck, NY, (coming from Bear Mountain across the Hudson River) which borders Kent, CT, at Ashley Falls, all the way up to another Bear Mountain at the Massachusetts border. Anderson spearheaded and maintained the Candlewood Mountain, Schaghticoke (SCAT-uh-coke) and Housatonic Range trails as well.

Ned Anderson organized Sherman's first boy scout troop in 1931 (Troop #48), and the boys earned badges by trailblazing. To spread the interest in hiking, nature and the trail, he organized The Housatonic Trail Club (HTC,) in 1932, which gave a portion of its annual dues to the ATC. Anderson and his volunteers maintained upkeep of his trails for nearly twenty years (1929–1948). In between, members piled in his bus (see biography below) and were treated to hikes all over New England.

Anderson drew the first official maps for the statewide Blue Blazed Trail System, which were made available to hikers in individual booklets. A comprehensive map was soon published in the 1933 issue of the Telephone News. CFPA's 1934 proposal to publish a complete trail guide finally came to fruition in 1937, with the first edition of the Connecticut Walk Book. It featured Ned's Candlewood Mountain Trail. This and Ned's Schaghticoke and Housatonic Range trails were also highlighted in a smaller publication, Walk Around New Milford.

The entire Appalachian Trail was completed in 1937 and by 1939 the National Park Service and U.S. Forest Service were working to formalize and protect the trail as a "scenic trailway."

Anderson officially retired from trail management in 1948 at age 63, whereupon the ATC board passed a formal resolution expressing their gratitude and sincere appreciation for his labors and accomplishments and distinguished service on behalf of the Appalachian Trail.

== Legacy ==
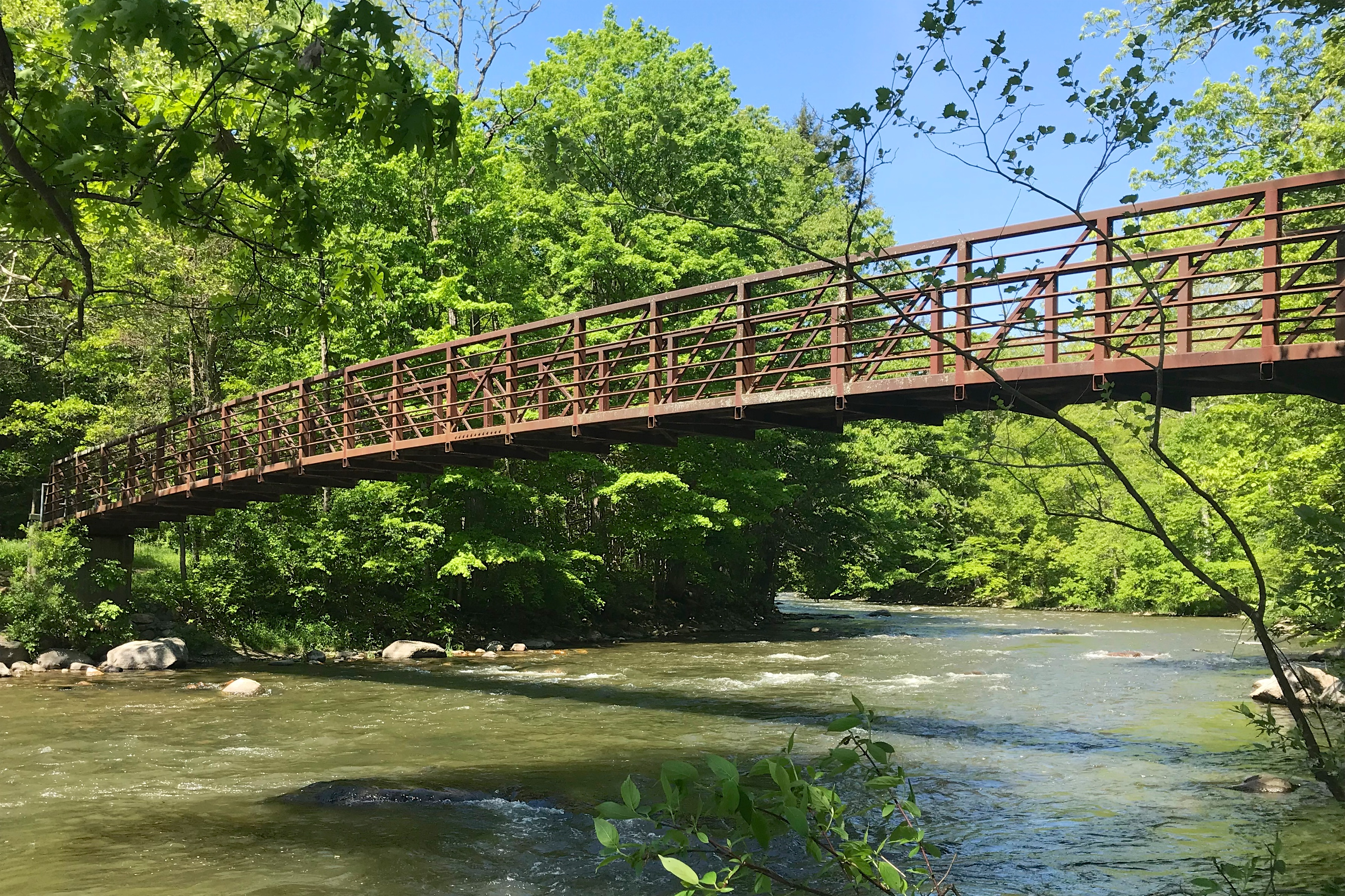
Ned Anderson Memorial Bridge crossing the Ten Mile River

In 1949, volunteer members of the Appalachian Mountain Club (AMC) took over maintenance of Connecticut's portion of the AT. In 1968, the National Trails System was created, and the Appalachian Trail was the first trail so designated.

In 1979, a portion of Connecticut's Appalachian Trail was rerouted. (The ATC has worked over the years to move more of the trail off public roadways and to allow for protected "corridors.") This was a combined effort between the Naromi Land Trust of Sherman, CT, and the Appalachian Trail Conference. Along this new leg at the confluence of the Ten Mile and Housatonic rivers north of Sherman, CT, a bridge now spans the waterway. In an unprecedented move by the ATC, it bears a plaque in dedication—to Ned K. Anderson.

Today, the Appalachian Trail is maintained by 31 trail clubs and multiple partnerships, and managed by the National Park Service, United States Forest Service, and the nonprofit Appalachian Trail Conservancy. In fact, over 5,500 volunteers log over 200,000 hours of service annually. Volunteers from the Connecticut Chapter of the Appalachian Mountain Club maintain the whole of the Connecticut section of the Appalachian Trail.

The ATC has expanded its role to include education, science and awareness in addition to trail maintenance and protection.

Connecticut Forest & Park Association continues to be a strong advocate for trails and conservation efforts throughout Connecticut and continually updates and publishes the Connecticut Walk Book, which is now done in two volumes—East and West, and features over 800 miles of trails. The Blue Blazed trails Anderson created and oversaw as a section manager have long since been delegated each to individual leaders and teams and continue to thrive.

Anderson was included in the 2015 class of the Appalachian Trail Hall of Fame at the Appalachian Trail Museum.

== Personal life ==
Born in Hartwell, Ohio, in 1885, Ned Anderson spent his youth in Mt. Vernon, NY, while his father worked for his wife's family's renowned, NYC-based Kipp Wagon Works. Anderson enjoyed the outdoors and developed an early love of nature and hiking. He attended both Columbia and Cornell (studying geology) for a time.

In 1906, his father retired and purchased Brae Burn farm (a poultry operation) in Sherman, CT. Ned (at 20) went along to work it. He continued to hike and camp. In 1914 he met and married Lena May Clark. The couple had four children. Anderson worked for the Long Island-based Sperry Company and lived in Brooklyn during World War I. It was there that Lena died of the flu epidemic in 1919. Anderson took his children back to the farm, soon met and married Edna Holstein, a city girl visiting family. They were married in 1921, and had one child together. The farm switched from poultry to dairy and the couple opened their 1840 farmhouse as a country bed and breakfast. Guests came from all over the world.

When his oldest son was ready for high school, Anderson purchased a bus to transport him and other children in Sherman to and from school, operating the service for thirty-three years. He also used the vehicle on Sundays for twenty-five years to transport children to Sunday school without financial compensation.

Ned and Edna shared an interest in and enthusiasm for young people. Their home was always open to and often filled with their children's friends. They also believed firmly in upgrading the educational experience in and out of the classroom. While Edna was important in organizing Sherman's first PTA and bringing much needed services to the school district and into the schools, Anderson, who thought the world—especially the outdoors—a classroom, sought to bring their bus-riding passengers an education on the way to and from school and via an array of entertaining class trips. Since the bus was privately owned, the Andersons could take their view of education on the road—and so often did.

Over the years, the Andersons suffered setbacks, such as the Great Depression, when the price of a gallon of milk dipped to that of a 3¢ postage stamp. And there were devastating tragedies: the death of a child and a catastrophic fire that destroyed their barn, equipment, supplies, and much of their herd. Although the HTC hikers and the Sherman community rallied to raise moneys for the Andersons, it was a financial loss from which they never fully recovered.

Edna became an artist and well-respected jewelry designer. She showed at Society of Connecticut Craftsmen (SCC) fairs, sold in NYC's fine department stores, and at the artist co-op she and Ned ran at Brae Burn Farm. He often collected and polished the stones she would use in her gold and silver designs.

In addition to hiking, Anderson also had a love for exploring nature underground as well. In the late '20s and '30s, he accompanied and assisted author, Clay Perry, to map and explore (and discover) caves. Their investigations of—and treks and crawls through—caves, abandoned mines, gorges and other subterranean finds across New England, were chronicled in Perry's 1939 book, Underground New England.

The National Speleological Society was organized in 1941 in Washington, DC. The first chapter or "grotto" formed of the NSS was the New England Chapter of Middlebury, CT. Co-organized by spelunker and author, Clay Perry and Ned Anderson, who was also its V.P.

Anderson officially retired from trail management in 1948 at age 63. He avidly continued hiking and spelunking for a number of years. Even as he got older and less sure-footed, he was known to take a jaunt with walking stick or cane, down the lane to visit with neighbors. Edna said that when her husband's legs gave out, so did he. Anderson died in 1967 at age 82.
