= Arthur Perkins (judge) =

American judge

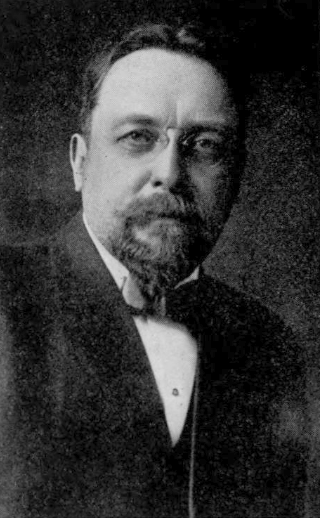
- Born: May 16, 1864; Hartford, Connecticut, US
- Died: May 16, 1932 (aged 68); Hartford, Connecticut, US
- Burial place: Cedar Hill Cemetery
- Education: Yale Law School
- Occupation(s): Lawyer, judge
- Spouse: Amy Denniston (m. 1895)
- Children: 1

Arthur Perkins (1864–1932) was an American lawyer and judge from Hartford, Connecticut who, during his retirement, spearheaded the effort to make Benton MacKaye's vision of the Appalachian Trail (a proposed 2,000-mile contiguous footpath to run through fourteen states) a reality.

== Biography ==
Arthur Perkins was born in Hartford on May 16, 1864. He graduated from Yale Law School in 1889.

He married Amy Denniston on May 22, 1895, and they had one daughter.

Perkins appointed himself acting chairman of the Appalachian Trail Conference (ATC, now known as the Appalachian Trail Conservancy) in the 1920s, and along with Myron Avery, rallied interest and involvement. The New York segment of the trail had been built in 1923, but work stalled until 1929, when Perkins found a willing worker in his home state. He tapped Ned Anderson to map Connecticut's 50-mile leg. It was quickly accomplished between 1929 and 1933.

Perkins was also a dynamic leader in the Connecticut Forest and Park Association (CFPA). He was a member of its Blue Blazed Trails Committee, under whose auspices Anderson worked. This committee was responsible for creating a series of walking trails throughout the state. CFPA maintains over 800 miles of blue-blazed trails to date.

An avid outdoorsman, JP, as he was known to his friends, also became a mountaineer later in life, joining the Appalachian Mountain Club when he was in his fifties. However, his health began to fail him in the early 1930s and Myron Avery took over the ATC chairmanship. Progress in Connecticut had inspired enthusiasm and the Appalachian Trail grew. The entire route was completed in 1937.

Prior to his involvement with the Appalachian Trail Committee, Perkins had been a graduate of Yale. In 1889 he took over the reins of the family law firm, Perkins & Perkins, from his father, Charles Perkins, and remained in charge until his death in 1932. Founded by Arthur's grandfather, Enoch Perkins, in 1786, the firm is now known as Howard, Kohn, Sprague & Fitzgerald, and it is the oldest law firm in continuous practice in the United States.

Arthur Perkins died at his home in Hartford on May 16, 1932, and was buried at Cedar Hill Cemetery.

On June 17, 2011 he was inducted into the Appalachian Trail Hall of Fame at the Appalachian Trail Museum as a charter member.
