= Jennifer Pharr Davis =

American hiker and author

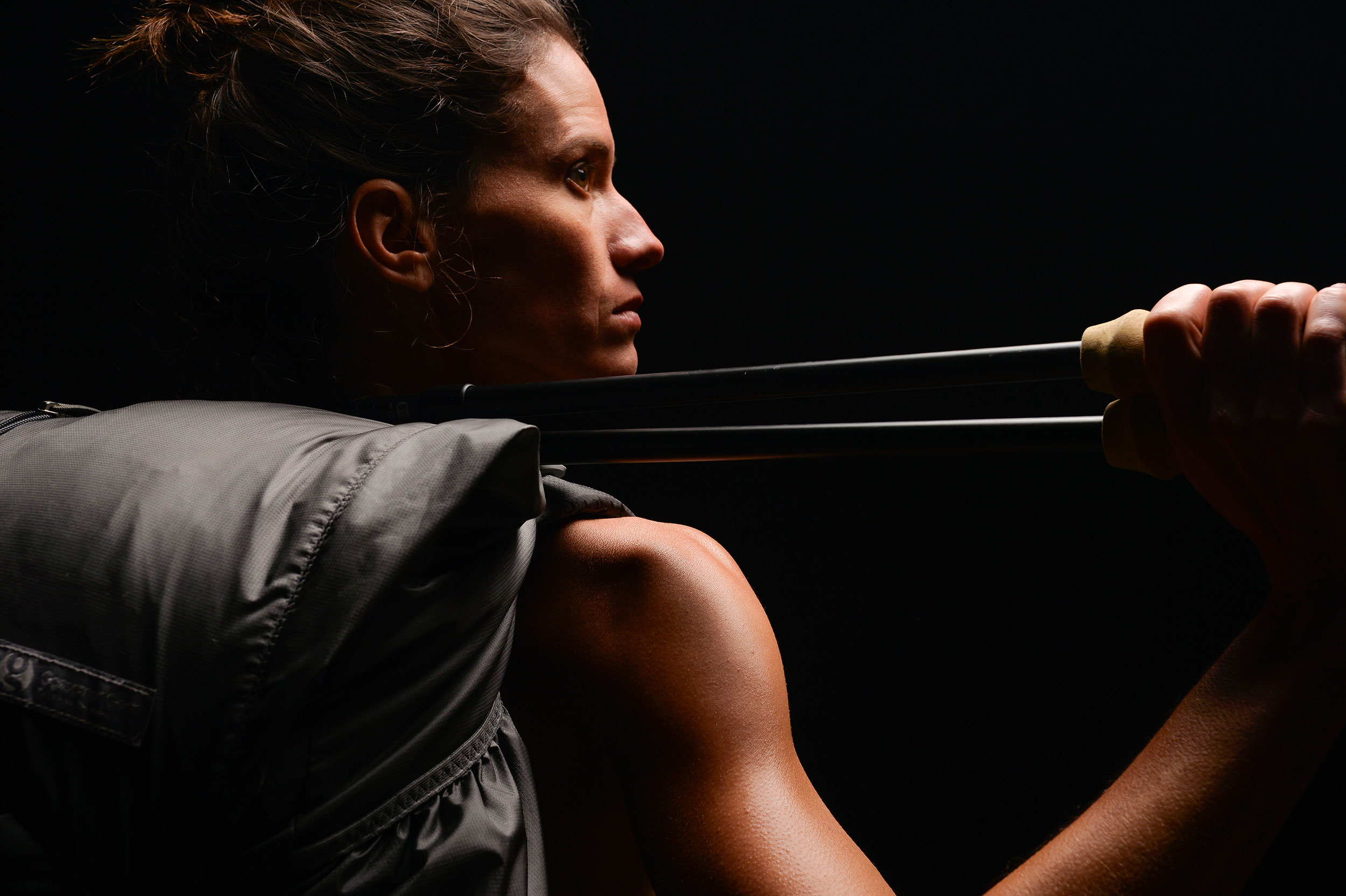
- Jennifer Pharr Davis in 2020
- Born: May 25, 1983 (age 43); Hendersonville, North Carolina, U.S.
- Other name: "Odyssa"
- Occupations: hiker, author, speaker, business owner
- Known for: Long Distance Hiking

Jennifer Pharr Davis (May 25, 1983) is an American long-distance hiker and author. She previously held the record for the fastest known time of hiking the Appalachian Trail, hiking it in 46 days, 11 hours, and 20 minutes in 2011.

== Early life and education ==
Pharr Davis grew up in Hendersonville, North Carolina. She attended Hendersonville High School and the Asheville School. She first hiked the Appalachian Trail in 2005 after graduating from Samford University. To prepare for her initial hike, she attended a class taught by Warren Doyle at the Appalachian Trail Institute.

== Hiking career ==
In 2008, she set the record for the fastest Appalachian Trail hike by a woman in 57 days and 8 hours at an average of 38 miles (61 km) per day. She had previously set the Long Trail trail record in 7 days and 15 hours in 2007. She also established the fastest known time on the Bibbulmun Track in Western Australia in 2008.

In 2008, Pharr Davis founded Blue Ridge Hiking Company, with the belief that "the trail is there for everyone at every phase of life" and with the goal of getting people outdoors on their own terms.

In 2011, Pharr Davis set the fastest known time on the Appalachian Trail completing it in 46 days, 11 hours and 20 minutes. In 2015, Scott Jurek finished 3 hours and 12 minutes faster. New records have subsequently been set by Karl Meltzer, Joe McConaughy, Karel Sabbe, and most recently Tara Dower.

In 2012, Pharr Davis was named one of National Geographic's Adventurers of the Year. She was also made an Ambassador for the American Hiking Society.

In 2012, Pharr Davis hiked 600 miles on the Laugavegur Trail in Iceland and the GR 11 (Spain) across the Pyrenees in her second and third trimesters while pregnant with her daughter Charley. While on an 18-month book tour, Pharr Davis and her husband Brew took Charley hiking in all 50 states before their daughter turned two.

In 2017, she hiked the 1,175 mile Mountains to Sea Trail in partnership with the Friends of the Mountains to Sea Trail for the trail's 40th anniversary and completed the hike while still nursing her newborn child, Gus.

In 2020, she began serving on the President's Council for Sports, Fitness, and Nutrition under a two-year position.

She has hiked over 12,000 miles on six different continents, including all 50 states of the United States.

As a member of the National Speakers Association, Pharr Davis has shared her trail lessons throughout the United States, Canada, and Europe. Her articles have appeared in print and online editions for the New York Times, Outside Magazine, Trail Runner, Backpacker, and Guideposts.

Pharr Davis served as a board member for the Appalachian Trail Conservancy, received a 2016 Laurel Wreath Award for athletic achievement from the Governor of North Carolina and was recognized as 2019 "Female Entrepreneur of the Year" by the Chamber of Commerce in Asheville, North Carolina. She was also named one of the 25 Most Adventurous Women of the Past 25 Years by Men's Journal, Blue Ridge Outdoors Magazine's Person of the Year in 2008 and her record-setting 2011 A.T. hike was named "Performance of the Year" by Ultrarunning Magazine.

Pharr Davis has hiked other long-distance trails including the Pinhoti Trail, the Bartram Trail, the Foothills Trail, the Art Loeb Trail, and the Benton Mackaye Trail. She has also hiked the Continental Divide Trail in sections through the Rocky Mountains.

== Writing ==
Pharr Davis has written a number of books. She has written two guidebooks about hiking in the Charlotte, North Carolina area, and one about hiking near Asheville, North Carolina. She has also written two memoirs- 2010's Becoming Odyssa, about her 2005 Appalachian Trail thru-hike, and 2013's Called Again, about her record setting A.T. hike, both published by Beaufort Books. Jennifer has also written 2017's Families on Foot and 2018's The Pursuit of Endurance as well as 2019's "I Come From a Place" with watercolorist Alan Shuptrine, from Chattanooga, Tennessee.

== Personal life ==
Pharr Davis lives in Asheville, North Carolina with her husband Brew, their daughter Charley, and son Gus. Brew Davis wrote about his wife's 2011 hike and how he provided support throughout it in his 2011 book 46 Days: Keeping Up With Jennifer Pharr Davis on the Appalachian Trail (Davis, 2011).
