= Warren Doyle =

American hiker

Warren Doyle (born 1950) is a hiker and supporter of the Appalachian Trail. He holds the informal record for the hiking the entire Appalachian Trail the most times (eighteen times; 9 thru-hikes and 9 section hikes). From 1974 to 2017, he organized and led 10 groups up the entire Appalachian Trail. He is the founder of two organizations dedicated to the trail: the Appalachian Long Distance Hikers Association, and the Appalachian Trail Institute. He currently is the Director of the Appalachian Trail Institute at the Appalachian Folk School, which he founded in 2010, in northeast Tennessee.

== Life ==
Doyle became interested in hiking while attending Southern Connecticut State College. He had spent one summer after his junior year volunteering in the mountains of Jamaica and the next year on the edge of the coalfields in southwest West Virginia; the latter enabled him to meet, and be mentored by, the noted Appalachian activist/educator/poet Don West. In 1973, he decided to hike the Appalachian Trail solo, and in doing so in 66.33 days, set the unofficial record for the then-fastest hike. Doyle has two children, and is divorced; and remarried. He went on to become an American Studies Professor at George Mason University and the founding director of that institution's Hemlock Overlook: Center for Outdoor Education (1985–96). From 2004 to 2010, he taught at Lees-McRae College in Banner Elk, North Carolina.

== Appalachian Trail hikes ==
Warren's interest in the Appalachian Trail was such that he organized a group of mostly college students to hike the trail in 1975. All 19 participants in the group completed the hike together in 109 days. Warren led additional "Circle Expeditions" of the Appalachian Trail in the years 1977, 1980, 1990, 1995, 2000, 2005, 2010 (also with higher than average completion rates); and then two 'regular' expeditions in 2015 and 2017.

Since 1989, approximately one thousand hikers have completed Warren's Appalachian Trail Institute, a five-day-long training course taken by those who hope to complete a thru-hike. According to Backpacker magazine, about 75% of those who complete this course go on to complete a through hike. This is substantially higher than the 20% - 25% of those who start on a hike who actually finish the entire trail in one year, as reported by the Appalachian Trail Conservancy.

== Influence on Well Known Hikers ==
Jennifer Pharr Davis, the onetime record holder for the fastest AT hike, completed Warren's Appalachian Trail Institute and cited him in her books as an inspiration. He wrote the introduction to her book, Becoming Odyssa.

Bill Irwin, a blind hiker, attended the Appalachian Trail Institute and went on to complete the trail with his seeing eye dog, becoming the first blind man to complete a thru-hike of the trail.

During the summer of 2018, Doyle provided logistical assistance to Karel Sabbe, a Belgian dentist and ultrarunner who set the fastest known time for a supported AT traverse (41.5 days - a record that stood until September 21, 2024).

During the summer of 2020, he (aka 'Jupiter') provided support for Liz Anjos (aka 'Mercury') on her FKT traverse (supported woman NOBO) of 51.5 days. His detailed knowledge of all the roads that cross the AT enabled him to meet Mercury with the support van (2003 Windstar van aka 'Pegasus') an unprecedented 427 times without ever being late.

== Criticism ==
Warren has been criticized for what some describe as a skeptical attitude toward rules & regulations. In the 1990s, the Appalachian Trail Conservancy removed a bathtub he had placed in a stream in Virginia near I-77. Warren has led his groups to cross the Kennebec River by fording, a practice the Maine Appalachian Trail Club says is dangerous as the volume of water flowing in the river can increase rapidly when an upstream dam is opened.

In winter 1979, following an act of civil disobedience, Warren was cited at Baxter State Park for climbing Katahdin, the terminus of the trail. As a matter of conscience, Warren chose to spend a night in jail rather than pay a $25 fine to raise awareness for what he thought was an unnecessary policy. Sometime after the incident, the Baxter State Park authorities changed the policy and allowed climbing of Katahdin in the rain.

== Involvement with Contra Dance ==
Warren is a contra dance caller, organizer, and dancer. Notably, he, along with his wife Terry, produce the Winter Contradancers Delight Holiday, held annually December 26-31 at Lakeview Golf Resort(Morgantown, W.Va.) and the Spring Contradancers Delight Holiday held annually in mid-May at the Appalachian Folk School in Mountain City, Tennessee.
