= Edesia Nutrition =

Therapeutic food company

Edesia Nutrition is an American non-profit company that makes Ready-to-Use Therapeutic Food (RUTF), including Plumpy'nut, which is patented by the French company Nutriset. The specialized food is used to treat children suffering from severe acute malnutrition. In a typical year it buys food from U.S. growers and makes Plumpy'Nut for five million children in thirty countries.

The company was founded in Rhode Island in 2010 by Navyn Salem. At that time Edesia was the sole producer of Plumpy’nut in the United States. By 2015, Edesia had helped 2.5 million children in 44 countries ranging from Chad and Pakistan to The Central African Republic.

Edesia primarily creates Ready-to-Use Therapeutic Food (RUTFs), as well as or Ready-to-Use-Supplementary Food (RUSFs). The food packets are designed for malnourished children. Edesia’s products include Plumpy’Nut, Plumpy’Doz, Plumpy’Sup, and Nutributter, which are high energy, peanut pastes fortified with ingredients including vitamins and minerals, skimmed milk powder, soy flour, sugar, whey and vegetable oils.

Edesia is licensed to produce Plumpy'Nut and is a member of Nutriset's PlumpyField network.

== Recognition and support ==
In June 2018, Navyn Salem, the founder and CEO of Edesia received Ernst & Young LLP’s Entrepreneur Ernst & Young Entrepreneur of the Year Award for 2018 for the New England region. Salem said she hoped the award would bring more visibility to the malnutrition crisis and the work Edesia was doing to bring about meaningful change.

Yogurt maker Chobani partnered with Edesia in 2021 to create Chobani peanut butter nutrient spreads. Chobani said it would donate 100 percent of profits from these spreads to Edesia for the production of Plumpy’Nut, the fortified peanut based food that is used to nourish children with acute malnutrition.

In November 2023, Edesia received a $137 million donation from the Bezos Family Foundation. In August 2024, The Church of Jesus Christ of Latter-day Saints donated $5 million to Edesia of part of their Relief Society's global initiative to help improve women and children's health.

== Disruptions ==
Edesia had signed contracts with USAID during the Biden administration. After Trump's election the downsizing at U.S. Agency for International Development crippled the agency's payment systems and led to interruptions for Edesia. In March 2025, Navyn Salem reported that Edesia had had a contract terminated only to have the termination rescinded the next day. Although the Edesia contract remained active, the downsizing of USAID has caused disarray. The termination of transportation contracts by USAID created a massive backlog that forced Edesia to rent additional warehouse space to store its production. The stockpile amounted to $13 million worth of life-saving product, which is enough to feed more than 484,000 children. The disruptions drew the attention of Elon Musk who said on social media March 2, that Edesia "should receive payment this coming week."

By late May, Edesia had not received full payment for product the government purchased last year. At a House Foreign Affairs committee hearing, Rhode Island Congressman Gabe Amo pressed Secretary of State Marco Rubio on behalf of Edesia, asking him to continue to fund the "production, transportation and distribution" of this domestically-produced product for starving children.

== Official website ==
Edesia Nutrition - www.edesianutrition.org
