= Vigie-Cratère =

Vigie-Cratère is a citizen science project from France in which laypeople help scientists find craters on the surface of the Earth left by meteorites by viewing satellite photographs.

Vigie-Cratère is part of a larger program called Vigie-Ciel. France's National Museum of Natural History, CNRS, University of Paris Saclay, Institut de recherche pour le développement, Paris Observatory, Grenoble Alpes University, Universcience, the Pythéas Institute, and the Natural History Museum Vienna pay for Vigie-Cratère.
