= Citadel spread =

Food used for treatment of mulnutrition

Citadel spread is a paste made of peanut butter, oil, sugar and milk powder. First developed as a trail food for hikers, a citadel spread resembles common ready-to-use therapeutic food (RUTF) formulations, such as Plumpy'nut.

== Composition and advantages ==
A key feature of citadel spread is the use of powdered milk in a recipe with no water, making it difficult for bacteria to grow and giving the nutritional advantages of milk with a long shelf life, as demonstrated in a clinical study comparing F100 and Plumpy'nut. Citadel spread provides a high calorie content of the mixture relative to weight and volume.

Another feature of citadel spread is the low cost of manufacturing, storing, and distribution. These features made formulations like citadel spread a practical ready-to-use food.

== History ==
Frank Delfino, former Skippy plant manager and engineer, remembers the Alameda plant producing around 500 cases of a ready-to-use fortified food in the 1960s, using peanut oil with added vitamins and minerals. Skippy proposed a collaboration with the US government to use the product for nutritional needs of children, but the proposal was not adopted.

In 1971, Edward B. Garvey published Appalachian Hiker: Adventure of a Lifetime. By the time Garvey published The New Appalachian Trail (Appalachian Hiker) in 1997, the vegetarian version of citadel spread that uses vegetable oil instead of bacon grease had become a popular hiking trail food in the US.

== Applications ==
Ready-to-use therapeutic foods are manufactured for treatment of severe acute malnutrition, as shown in one clinical report. Such formulations support rapid weight gain, supply multiple essential nutrients and are easy for children to eat because they can feed themselves the soft paste from a tear-open individual package. The fortified peanut butter-like paste contains fats, carbohydrates, proteins (macronutrients), vitamins and minerals (micronutrients). Peanut butter is relatively high in calories and an excellent source of vitamin E, B vitamins, dietary fiber and numerous dietary minerals.

== See also ==
- Famine relief
- Pemmican
- List of peanut dishes
