= Plumpy'nut =

Peanut-derived food used to treat child malnutrition, particularly during famines

Plumpy'Nut
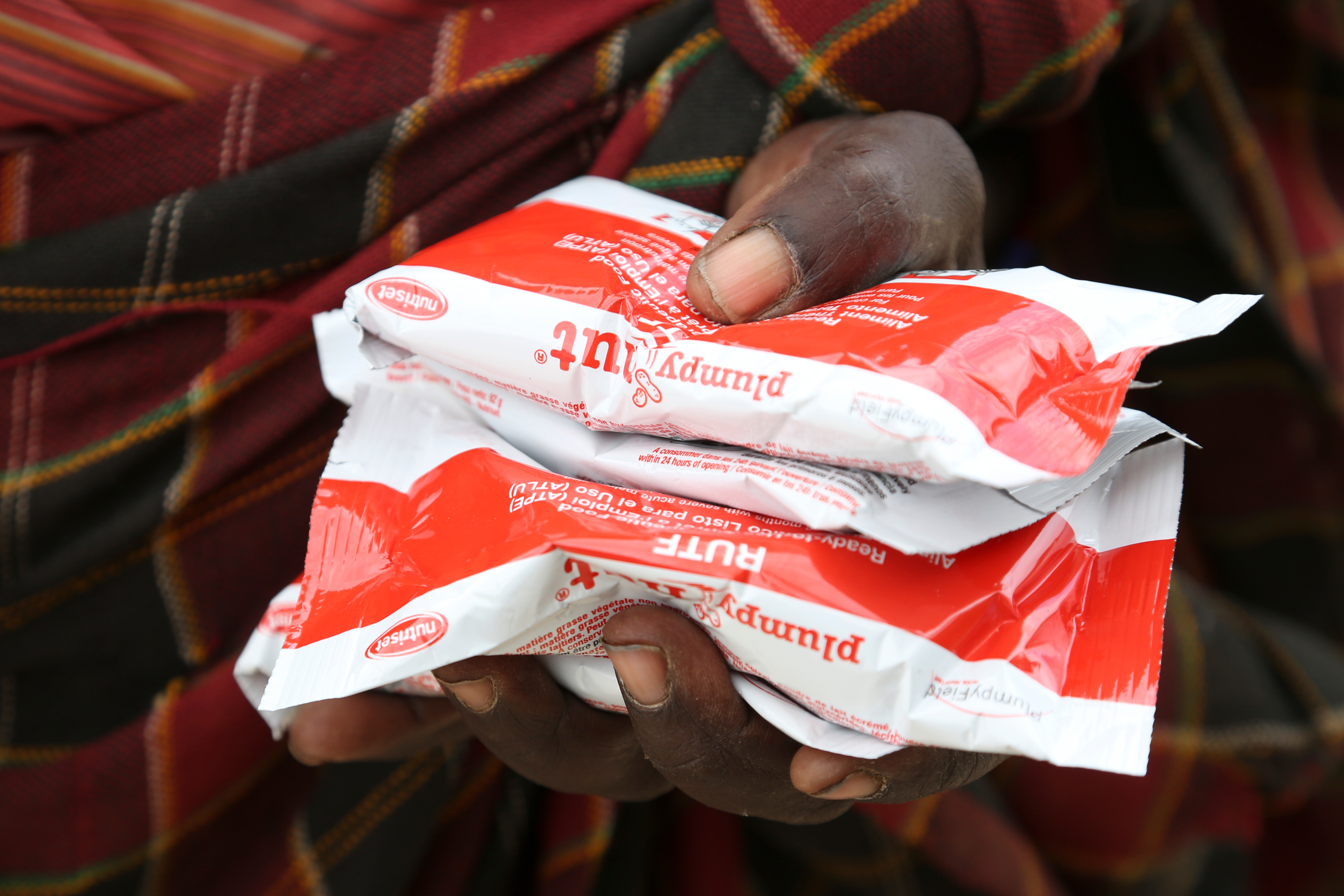
- Plumpy'Nut, a ready-to-use therapeutic food (RUTF)

Nutritional value per 92 g (sachet)
- Energy: 500 kcal (2,100 kJ)
- Carbohydrates: 45 g
- Fat: 30.3 g
- Protein: 12.8 g
Vitamins and minerals
Vitamins	Quantity %DV^{†}
Vitamin A equiv.	88% 790 μg
Thiamine (B1)	38% 0.46 mg
Riboflavin (B2)	115% 1.5 mg
Niacin (B3)	29% 4.6 mg
Pantothenic acid (B5)	56% 2.8 mg
Vitamin B6	32% 0.55 mg
Biotin (B7)	2% 56 μg
Folate (B9)	46% 184 μg
Vitamin B12	63% 1.5 μg
Vitamin C	53% 48 mg
Vitamin D	70% 14 μg
Vitamin E	123% 18.4 mg
Minerals	Quantity %DV^{†}
Calcium	23% 302 mg
Copper	167% 1.5 mg
Iron	107% 19.3 mg
Magnesium	19% 80 mg
Phosphorus	27% 343 mg
Potassium	39% 1171 mg
Selenium	51% 28 μg
Sodium	7% 165 mg
Zinc	107% 11.8 mg
Iodine	1% 98 μg
- Other constituents: Quantity
- Ingredients: peanut paste, vegetable oil, powdered milk, sucrose, vitamins, minerals
- ^{†}Percentages estimated using US recommendations for adults, except for potassium, which is estimated based on expert recommendation from the National Academies. Source: Nutriset, France

Plumpy'Nut is a peanut-based paste, packaged in a plastic wrapper, for treatment of severe acute malnutrition. Plumpy'Nut is manufactured by Nutriset, a French company. Feeding with the 92-gram (3 1/4 oz) packets of this paste reduces the need for hospitalization. It can be administered at home, allowing more people to be treated.

Plumpy'Nut may be referred to in scientific literature as a Ready-to-Use Therapeutic Food (RUTF) alongside other RUTFs such as BP100.

Nutriset has been criticized by Médecins Sans Frontières for enforcing its Plumpy'Nut patents. However, as of 2018, Plumpy'Nut patents have expired in the US, UK and the European Union.

== Use ==
Plumpy'Nut is used as a treatment for emergency malnutrition cases. It supports rapid weight gain derived from broad nutrient intake which can alleviate impending illness or death in a starving child. The product is easy for children to eat because it dispenses readily from a durable, tear-open package. The fortified peanut butter–like paste contains fats, dietary fiber, carbohydrates, proteins (as essential macronutrients), vitamins and minerals (as essential micronutrients). Peanut butter itself is a rich source of vitamin E (45% of the Daily Value, DV, in a 100-gram amount) and B vitamins (particularly niacin at 67% DV).

Plumpy'Nut has a two-year shelf life and requires no water, preparation, or refrigeration. Its ease of use has made mass treatment of malnutrition in famine situations more efficient than in the past. Severe acute malnutrition has traditionally been treated with therapeutic milk and required hospitalization. Unlike milk, Plumpy'Nut can be administered at home and without medical supervision. It also provides calories and essential nutrients that restore and maintain body weight and health in severely malnourished children more effectively than F100.

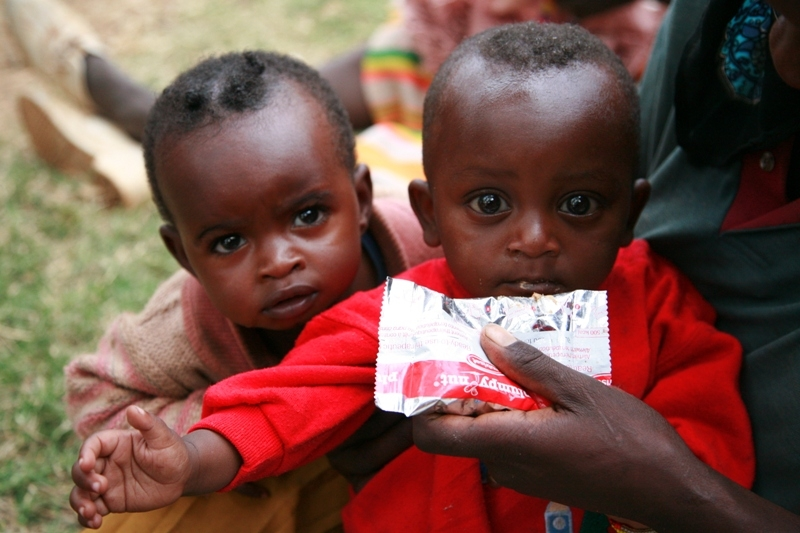
Children receive Plumpy'nut nutritional aid in Ethiopia

The United Nations has recognized this utility, stating in 2007 that "new evidence suggests ... that large numbers of children with severe acute malnutrition can be treated in their communities without being admitted to a health facility or a therapeutic feeding centre," as was implemented in 2007 by UNICEF and the European Commission's Humanitarian Aid Department in Niger to address a malnutrition emergency. Plumpy'Nut conforms to the UN definition of a Ready-to-Use Therapeutic Food (RUTF).

Plumpy'Nut is not intended for routine nutrition, or for malnutrition in non-famine situations. Peanut allergies have not been found to be a problem in usage due to a lack of allergic reactions in the target populations.

== Composition ==
The ingredients in Plumpy'Nut include "peanut-based paste, with sugar, vegetable oil and skimmed milk powder, enriched with vitamins and minerals". Plumpy'Nut is said to be "surprisingly tasty".

== Production ==
While the majority of Plumpy'Nut was made in France as of 2010, this therapeutic food is easily produced and can be made locally in peanut-growing areas by mixing peanut paste with a slurry of other ingredients provisioned by Nutriset.

A number of partner companies make Plumpy'Nut, including two U.S. nonprofits, Edesia Nutrition in Rhode Island and Mana in Georgia. There are six factories in African countries (Niger, Burkina Faso, Ethiopia, Sudan, Madagascar, Kenya), one in Haiti and another one in India.

Plumpy'Nut is distributed from the manufacturer to geographic areas of need through a complex supply chain. Forward (downstream) information flow, such as projections of need, order processing, and payment processing, and backward (upstream) information flow, including stock monitoring, quality assurance, and performance data occur through information exchange vulnerable to errors or tardiness associated with supply chain fragmentation. Factors affecting potential for loss of efficiency in the supply chain are information flow on orders, basis of need, forecasts, flow upstream from field officers and country offices to parties controlling regional distribution and manufacturing by Nutriset, downstream flow of information on delivery times and order status.

A complete two-month regimen for a child costs US$60 c. 2010.

== History ==
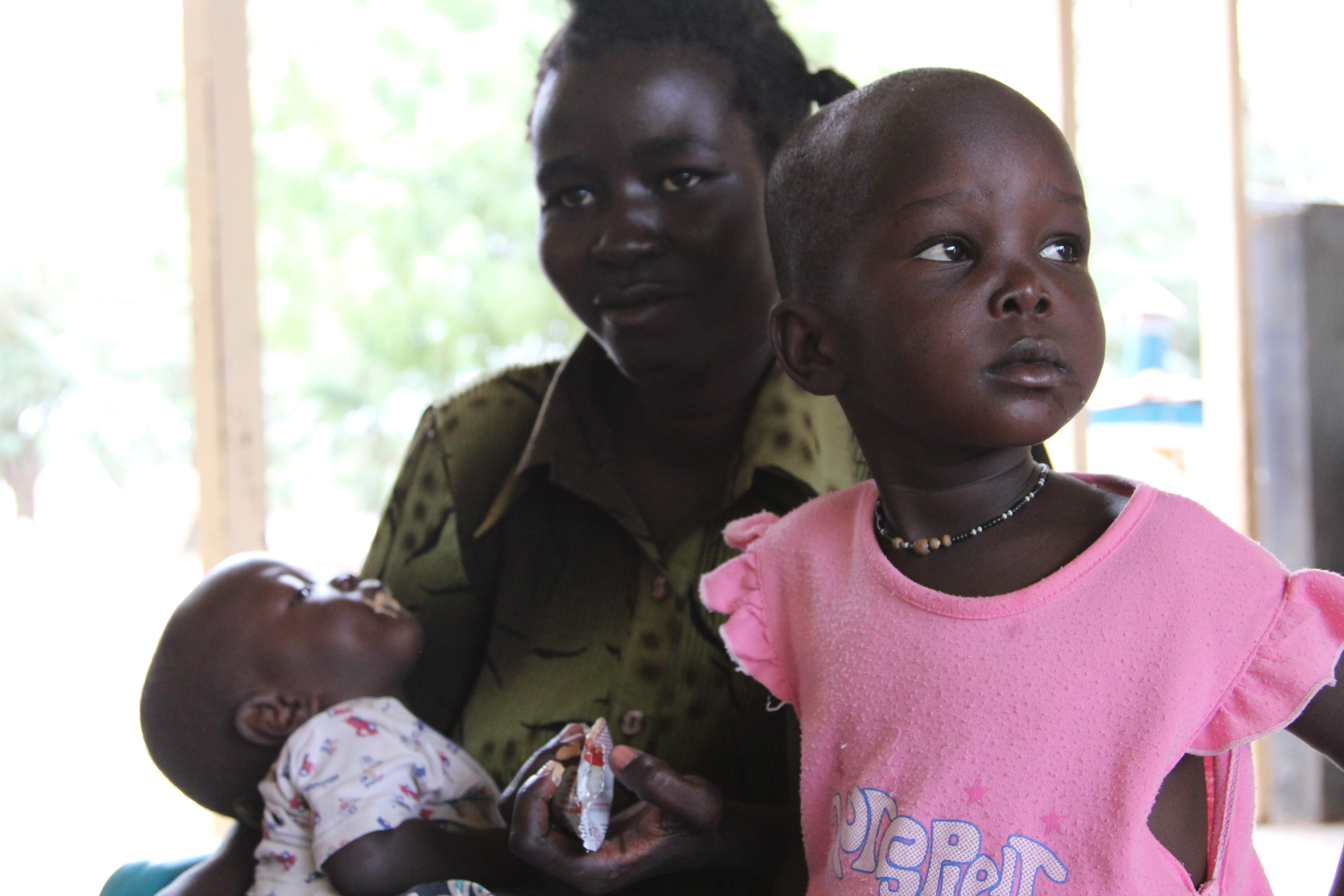
Woman giving Plumpy'Nut nutritional aid to her children in Kenya

Inspired by the popular Nutella spread, Plumpy'Nut was invented in 1996 by André Briend, a French paediatric nutritionist, and Michel Lescanne, a food-processing engineer. Nutella is a spread composed of sugar, modified palm oil, hazelnuts, cocoa, skimmed milk powder, whey powder, lecithin, and vanillin. In contrast, Plumpy'Nut is a combination of peanut paste, vegetable oil and milk powder, without including chocolate, but containing sugar, vitamins and dietary minerals.

=== Patent issues ===
Nutriset holds or held patents in many countries (including US patent 6346284, published in 2002) for the production of nut-based, nutritional foods as pastes, which they have defended to prevent non-licensees in the United States from producing similar products. In places where Nutriset does not hold a patent, manufacturers of similar pastes have been stopped from exporting their products to places where Plumpy'Nut is patented. In at least 27 African nations, any non-profit (including NGOs) can make the paste and not pay a license fee.

In 2010, two US non-profit organizations unsuccessfully sued the French company in an attempt to legally produce Plumpy'Nut in the US without paying the royalty fee. Mike Mellace, president of one of the organizations claimed that "some children are dying because Nutriset prevents other companies from producing a food which could save their lives." Invalidation of the Nutriset patent may have a positive impact on populations affected by famine, and studies by humanitarian organizations support the idea that having a single, dominant supplier in Nutriset is undesirable. Critics of Nutriset argue the US patent is "obvious in light of prior recipes" and "that the patent has essentially conferred monopoly power on Nutriset and thus violated the Sherman Act". By definition, a patent grants a temporary monopoly, and Nutriset won the case. Some have suggested a similarity between pharmaceutical company compulsory licensing agreements, in place under the WTO TRIPS Agreement, and Plumpy'Nut.

Following a threat of legal action against a Norwegian company that was exporting a similar product to Kenya, Nutriset was criticized by Médecins Sans Frontières, which stated in an open letter that "Nutriset has been asked repeatedly by us and others for simple, reasonable licensing terms ... Instead it appears that [Nutriset has] decided to adopt a policy of aggressive protection of [its] patents that could be considered an abuse in relation to humanitarian products." A UNICEF study, commissioned at Duke University and the University of North Carolina, recommended a diversified supplier base of RUTF products to better serve global needs. In response to the criticism, Nutriset has allowed companies and NGOs in some African countries to make the paste and not pay license fees.

The Plumpy'Nut patents in the USA expired in 2017 (US patent 6346284), and in the UK and the European Union in 2018 (EP patent 1032280).

== See also ==
- Citadel spread
- Famine relief
- Humanitarian daily ration
- List of peanut dishes
- Mantecol
- Nutribun
