= Denis Vidal =

French anthropologist

- Born: July 4, 1954 (age 72)
- Occupation: Anthropologist

Academic background
- Education: Doctor of Philosophy
- Alma mater: Institut de recherche pour le développement
- Thesis: Le Culte des Divinités Locales dans une Région de l'Himachal Pradesh (November 1981)
- Doctoral advisor: Charles Malamoud

Academic work
- Discipline: Anthropology
- Sub-discipline: Social anthropology
- Institutions: Associate professor at the School for Advanced Studies in the Social Sciences; Research director at Institut de recherche pour le développement

Denis Vidal (born 4 July 1954) is a French anthropologist with a doctorate degree from the Ecole Pratique des Hautes Etudes and the Université de Nanterre. He is an associate professor at the EHESS School for Advanced Studies in the Social Sciences and a senior research fellow (Directeur de recherche) at the Institut de recherche pour le développement.

== Education and career ==
Vidal completed his Ph.D. in 1983 at the EPHE and the University of Nanterre, under the supervision of Charles Malamoud, with a doctoral thesis titled 'Le Culte des Divinités Locales dans une Région de l'Himachal Pradesh (The Cult of Local Divinities in a Region of Himachal Pradesh)'.

== Research ==
Vidal is a social anthropologist. He is serving as a research director at the Institut de recherche pour le développement, and as the assistant director at the Paris branch of the Migrations and Society Research Unit (URMIS).

Vidal has been exploring India since his doctoral studies. Some of his research works on India include the "archival exploration" of Sirohi State and his studies on the "economic organisation of the bazaar", the social and religious anthropology of the Himalayas, and "visual culture of the old city of Delhi". He delved into the disputed contest over the patent rights of Basmati rice between India and the United States. Vidal has also explored "new ways of approaching technology from an anthropological perspective". In 2019, Vidal, along with D. Balasubramanian, carried out a study on the building of wooden cargo ships in India's Tamil Nadu.

=== Berenson (Robot) ===
Vidal and Philippe Gaussier co-developed a "robot art critic" dubbed Berenson (after the art critic Bernard Berenson). Berenson can take note of the reactions of people to art works and employ its neural network to learn from their reactions in order to develop its own aesthetic preferences and to express them through facial expressions.

=== Museum exhibitions ===
Vidal has been one of the curators of the exhibition Persona (Musée du Quai Branly, Paris, January - October 2016, and of the permanent exhibition on robotics at the Cité des Sciences et de l'Industrie, Paris (opening in April 2019)

=== Films ===
OF WOOD AND WIND.Sustainable cargo ships in France and in India. DE BOIS ET DE VENT. Deux alternatives pour un transport maritime responsible Co-produit par l'IRD et l'ADEME, avec le soutien de l'Institut français de Pondichery

== Written work ==
Vidal's Violence and Truth: A Rajasthani Kingdom Confronts Colonial Authority (1995) (Note: Originally published in French in 1995; translated in English in 1997.) was a study of history of the Sirohi State, focusing mainly on the influence exerted by British values and legal system on politics and society in Sirohi during the late 19th and early 20th centuries, providing "a vivid picture of caste-specific protest repertory". Vidal's study shed light on the relationship between the rulers of Sirohi and the Jain merchants with regard to the "colonial idea of economy"; inquired into the relationship between violence and mutineers in Rajasthan and how it was "remade through the colonial encounter"; and explored the Gandhian thought in apropos of the British colonial laws in India.

for various reviews of this book, see Norbert Peabody Christophe Jaffrelot, Frank de Zwart, Ajay Skaria Skaria(August 1999). And for an indepth study of it see Lawrence Babb, 2004

== Works ==
=== Books authored ===
- Vidal Denis, Balusubrumaniam D, Sricandane G. (collab.). (2024). Boat Builders of the Coromandel: A craft and its makers; Tara Books, Chennai, 164 p. ISBN 978-93-90037-07-0
- Vidal Denis, Balusubrumaniam D, Sricandane G. (collab.). (2023). Wild craft: wooden cargo ships of South India. Marseille (FRA); Pondichéry: IRD; IFP, 369 p. ISBN 978-81-8470-249-1. https://www.ifpindia.org/bookstore/wild-craft/, https://horizon.documentation.ird.fr/exl-doc/pleins_textes/2023-11/010090498.pdf
- Laumond J.P., Vidal Denis, Boutin A.L. (ill.). (2018). Robots : le livre de l'exposition Robots : the exhibition book. [Paris] : Cité des Sciences et de l'Industrie, ISBN 978-2-86842-197-5.
- Vidal, Denis (2016). Aux Frontières de l'Humain: Dieux, Figures de Cire, Robots et Autres Artefacts [At the Human Frontiers: Gods, Wax Figures, Robots and Other Artifacts]. Essai. Histoire. Anthropologie (in French). Paris, France: Alma. ISBN 978-2362791741. OCLC 936547857. S2CID 165948940.
- Vidal, Denis (1995). Violences et Vérités: Un Royaume du Rajasthan Face au Pouvoir Colonial [Violence and Truth: A Rajasthani Kingdom Confronts Colonial Authority]. Recherches d'Histoire et de Sciences Sociales, Volume 62 [Studies in History and the Social Sciences, Volume 62] (in French). Paris, France: EHESS. ISBN 978-2713210181. LCCN 95204209. OCLC 407004217.
- Vidal Denis, Le culte des divinités locales dans une région de l'Himachal Pradesh Paris, ORSTOM, 1989, 320p.
- Vidal Denis, Le culte des divinités locales dans une région de l'Himachal Pradesh Paris, ORSTOM, 1989, 320p.
- Emmanuel Grimaud, Yann Philippe Tastevin, Denis Vidal. dossier : Low tech ? Wild tech !. France. Techniques et culture, 1 (67), Éditions de l'EHESS, 288 p., 2017.
- Vidal, Denis; Meyer, Eric; Tarabout, Gilles, eds. (1994). Violences et Non-violences en Inde [Violence and Non-violence in India]. Puruṣārtha, Volume 16 (in French). Paris, France: EHESS. ISBN 978-2713210143. LCCN 94168835. OCLC 300439786.
- Denis Vidal. Dufrêne T. (ed.), Grimaud E. (ed.), Taylor A.C. (ed.), Vidal Denis (ed.). Persona : étrangement humain [exposition, Musée du quai Branly, Paris, 26 janvier-13 novembre 2016]Paris : Musée du Quai Branly; Actes Sud, 2016, 271 p. ISBN 978-2-330-03801-4 . France. Musée du Quai Branly; Actes Sud, 271 p., 2016.
- Grimaud E., Houdard S., Vidal Denis. (2006). Artifices et effets spéciaux : les troubles de la représentation. In : Grimaud E. (ed.), Houdard S. (ed.), Vidal Denis (ed.). Effets spéciaux et artifices. Terrain, 46, p. 5-14. ISSN 0760-5668.
- Dupont Véronique (ed.), Tarlo E. (ed.), Vidal Denis (ed.). (2000). Delhi : urban space and human destinies. New Delhi : Manohar, 261 p. ISBN 81-7304-366-3.
- Denis Vidal, Philippe Cadene. Webs of trade : dynamics of business communities in western India. India. CHS; Manohar, 196 p., 1997.Webs of Trade, ISBN 9788173041877
- Vidal, Denis; Cadène, Philippe, eds. (1987). L'Inde dans Les Sciences Sociales [India in the Social Sciences] (Les Communications et les Débats de la Journée Consacrée à "l'Inde dans les Sciences Sociales" Qui a eu Lieu le 12 Juin 1987 à l'ORSTOM à Paris). Bulletin de Liaison, No. 13. France: ORSTOM. OCLC 489929612.

=== Selected papers ===
- Vidal D, Balasubramanian D.« Les cargos en bois de l’Inde du Sud ». Face à la puissance: Une histoire des énergies alternatives à l’âge industriel, Paris, La Découverte, 2020.
- Vidal D, Balasubramaniam D « Comment s’inventent les bateaux ? Cargos en bois du Tamil Nadu » Low Tech ?Wild Tech ! Techniques et Culture, 2017
- Vidal, Denis (2012). "Vers un Nouveau Pacte Anthropomorphique! Les Enjeux Anthropologiques de la Nouvelle Robotique" [Towards a New Anthropomorphic Pact! Anthropological Issues of the New Robotics] (PDF). Gradhiva (in French). 15 (Robots Étrangement Humains). Paris, France: Musée du Quai Branly: 54–75. doi:10.4000/GRADHIVA.2319. S2CID 191706252.
- Vidal, Denis (December 2007). "Anthropomorphism or Sub-Anthropomorphism? An Anthropological Approach to Gods and Robots". The Journal of the Royal Anthropological Institute. 13 (4). Royal Anthropological Institute of Great Britain and Ireland: 917–933. doi:10.1111/j.1467-9655.2007.00464.x. JSTOR 4623070. S2CID 162190128.
- Vidal, Denis (1997). "Max Müller and the Theosophists or the Other Half of Victorian Orientalism". Orientalism and Anthropology: From Max Müller to Louis Dumont. By Vidal, Denis; Assayag, Jackie; Lardinois, Roland. Pondy Papers in Social Sciences, Volume 24. Pondicherry, India: French Institute of Pondicherry. ISBN 978-8184700770. LCCN 98900711. OCLC 246067073.
- Vidal, Denis (July–August 1997). "Empirisme et Croyance dans l'Hindouisme Contemporain: Quand les Dieux Boivent du Lait!" [Empiricism and Belief in Contemporary Hinduism: When the Gods Drink Milk!]. Annales. Histoire, Sciences Sociales (in French). 52 (4, L'Hindouisme Aujourd'hui [Hinduism Today]). Cambridge University Press: 881–915. doi:10.3406/ahess.1997.279606. JSTOR 27585469.
- Vidal, Denis (1991). "Les Trois Grâces ou l'Allégorie du Don: Contribution à l'Histoire d'une Idée en Anthropologie" [The Three Graces, or the Allegory of the Gift: A Contribution to the History of an Idea in Anthropology]. Gradhiva (in French). 9 (1). Translated by Rimbault, Eléonore. Paris, France: Musée du Quai Branly: 30–47. doi:10.3406/gradh.1991.1372. OCLC 1005923907. S2CID 192540155.
- Vidal, Denis (July–December 1987). Toffin, Gérard (ed.). "Une Négociation Agitée: Essai de Description d'une Situation d'Interaction Entre des Hommes et des Dieux". Études Rurales (in French). 107 (107–108, Paysages et Divinités en Himalaya). Paris, France: EHESS: 71–83. doi:10.3406/RURAL.1987.3203. eISSN 1777-537X. ISSN 0014-2182. JSTOR 20125061. S2CID 161490826.
