= Nutriset =

French therapeutic food manufacturer

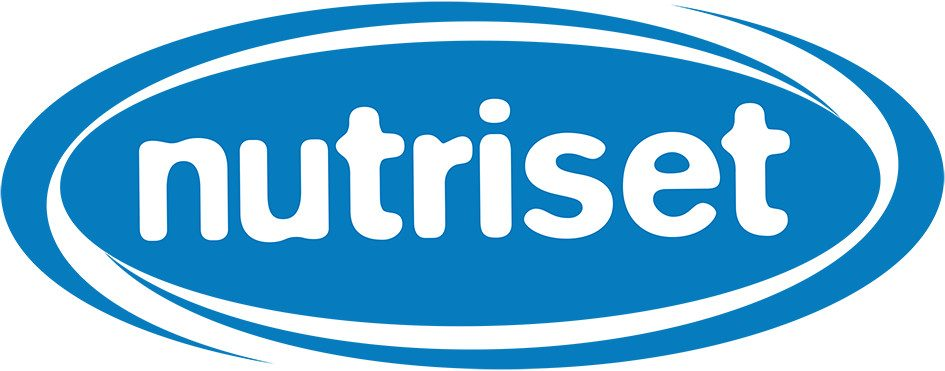
logo nutriset.jpg

Nutriset is the French manufacturer and trademark owner of Plumpy'nut, the peanut-based food for use in famine relief. It was formulated in 1997 by André Briend, a French pediatric nutritionist. The majority of Plumpy'nut is produced in a Nutriset factory in Malaunay, and Unicef purchases 90 percent of the supply from that factory for humanitarian aid.

Nutriset is associated with the development and supply of ready-to-use therapeutic food (RUTF).

== History and products ==
In 1996, Nutriset and IRD developed Plumpy'Nut as an energy-dense, micronutrient-enhanced paste and generic RUTF product. Michel Lescanne founded Nutriset and, working with André Briend, developed and patented Plumpy'Nut. According to UNICEF's Supply Division, Nutriset was initially the only qualified international supplier of ready-to-use therapeutic food (RUTF) for export. The company later expanded its operations by establishing local franchises in Africa, the Americas, and Asia.
