= Michel Lescanne =

French company executive

- Occupations: Engineer, president, and chief executive officer
- Known for: Co-invention of Plumpy'nut and founding Nutriset

Michel Lescanne is a French food processing engineer jointly responsible for the invention of the ready-to-use therapeutic food (RUTF) Plumpy'nut in 1996, and presently serves as president and chief executive officer (CEO) of the French pharmaceutical manufacturer Nutriset.

== Notes ==
1. Briend, André; Lescanne, Michel (14 July 2000). "Food or nutritional supplement, preparation method and uses". United States Patent and Trademark Office.
2. Schofield, Hugh (8 April 2010). "Legal fight over Plumpy'nut, the hunger wonder-product". BBC News. BBC.
3. Ducable, Guillaume (6 November 2009). "Nutriset. Entreprise responsable". Le Journal des entreprises (in French).
4. von Schoen-Angerer, Tido (13 November 2009). "MSF: Nutriset patent impeding access to treatment of Severe Acute Malnutrition". Médecins Sans Frontières.
5. Enserink, Martin (3 October 2008). "Patents: A Recipe for Problems?". Science. 322 (5898): 38. doi:10.1126/science.322.5898.38. PMID 18832624. S2CID 35082040.
6. Enserink, Martin (3 October 2008). "The Peanut Butter Debate". Science. 322 (5898): 36–38. doi:10.1126/science.322.5898.36. PMID 18832623. S2CID 46550185.
7. "Ma pâte à base d'arachide évite l'hospitalisation aux enfants" (PDF). Le Parisien (in French). 11 June 2012.
8. "Nutriset: une belle histoire" (in French). Le monde comme il va. Archived from the original on 15 June 2012.
9. "FOOD: Plumpy'nut patent under pressure". Integrated Regional Information Networks (IRIN). United Nations. 12 January 2010.
10. Lescanne, Michel (March 2005). "Letter on commercial production of RUTF" (24). Field Exchange: 17. Archived from the original on 6 September 2011.
11. Fernandez, Alejandra; Sauguet, Isabelle; Da Costa, Florence; Claeyssens, Virginie; Lescanne, Adeline; Lescanne, Michel (March 2009). "Social marketing of a nutritional supplement in Niger" (35). Field Exchange: 28. Archived from the original on 21 February 2013.
12. Lescanne, Michel (November 2002). "Reducing the price of Plumpy'nut" (17). Field Exchange: 23. Archived from the original on 21 February 2013.
