= André Briend =

André Briend is a French pediatric nutritionist best known for his 1996 co-formulation of Plumpy'nut, a Ready-to-Use Therapeutic Food (RUTF), with Dr. Mark Manary. Starting in 1994, Briend, who at the time worked at Institut de recherche pour le développement, worked with Michel Lescanne to develop variants of renutrition products in solid form. At the time, the WHO-recommended diet for the treatment of severe malnutrition required clean water, a commodity only available in hospitals in most developing countries. These trial products were ultimately discarded for not meeting the requirements of good shelf-life, pleasant taste, or logistic simplicity. In 1996, inspired by a jar of chocolate spread which had a similar composition of proteins, energy, and lipids as the diet recommended by the WHO, Briend came up with the idea of replacing part of the dry skim milk in the existing recipe with peanut butter and eventually created Plumpy'nut. Briend also served as a medical officer for the Department of Child & Adolescent Health and Development at the World Health Organization.
