= Ironmaster's Mansion Hostel =

Historic building near Gardners, Pennsylvania, USA

Coordinates: 40°1′56″N 77°18′28.5″W

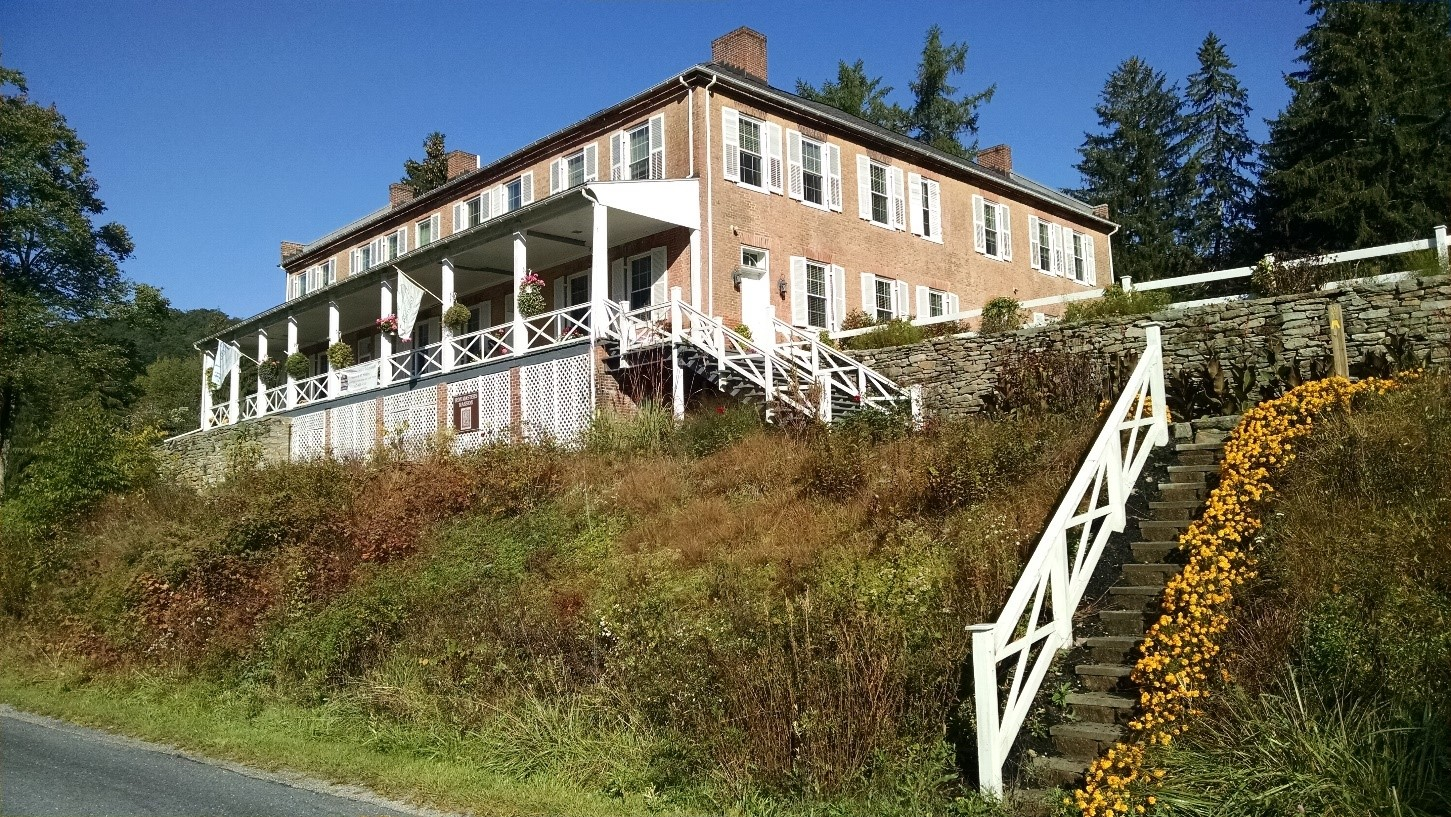

The Ironmaster's Mansion is a hostel and event venue located near Gardners, Pennsylvania, United States. It is located within Pine Grove Furnace State Park and is also near the midpoint of the Appalachian Trail.

The hostel is operated by the Appalachian Trail Museum, and is located a few hundred yards away from the Museum.

== History ==
This mansion was built circa 1829 by Peter Ege when he was ironmaster of the Pine Grove Iron Works, located nearby. Notable owners after Ege were Fredericks Watts, lawyer, Cabinet member in the U.S. Grant Administration and founder of Penn State University, and Jay Cooke, an early American investment banker and financier of the Union during the Civil War.

After the Iron Works closed in 1895, the mansion fell into disuse. In 1913, the Iron Works and surrounding land, including the mansion, were sold to the Commonwealth of Pennsylvania, which owns the mansion to this day. Eventually, it became Pine Grove Furnace State Park.

During the 1920s, the Appalachian Trail was laid out, passing through the park and close to the mansion. The mansion subsequently became a hostel for hikers using the trail. It was operated by a unit of American Youth Hostels for twenty-five years (until 2010).

That year, the Central Pennsylvania Conservancy was granted a lease by the Pennsylvania DCNR, which made extensive renovations to the interior and then operated the mansion as a hotel and events venue.

In 2020, operation of the Mansion was turned over to the Appalachian Trail Museum. The museum continues to operate the mansion as a hostel for hikers and venue for events.
