= Mistrals =

MISTRALS ("Integrated Mediterranean Studies at Regional and Local Scales") is a research program dedicated to the study of the Mediterranean basin and its surroundings, with the aim to "better understand the impact of global factors on this region and to anticipate changes over a century of living conditions".

Established in August 2008 under the auspices of the CNRS, it quickly became a collaborative program of many research organisations from France and other Mediterranean countries. "Corporate governance is provided by an International Steering Committee and a Steering Inter-Agency Committee, which validate the scientific plans of each program and provide working capital finance".

Its scientific direction and financial support are provided by CNRS and IRD (the co-directors are Etienne Ruellan CNRS / INSU and Abdelghani Chehbouni IRD), together with eleven other French research institutions (ADEME, BRGM, CEA, Cemagref, CIRAD, CNES, IFP énergies nouvelles, IFREMER, INRA, IRSN and Météo-France).

In 2011, over 1,000 scientists worked in seven scientific programs. Research programs are interdisciplinary. The themes include terrestrial and marine ecosystems, fisheries, climate, geology, urban planning, agriculture, the availability of fresh water, economics, sociology and anthropology.
