= Alan Shuptrine =

American painter (born 1963)

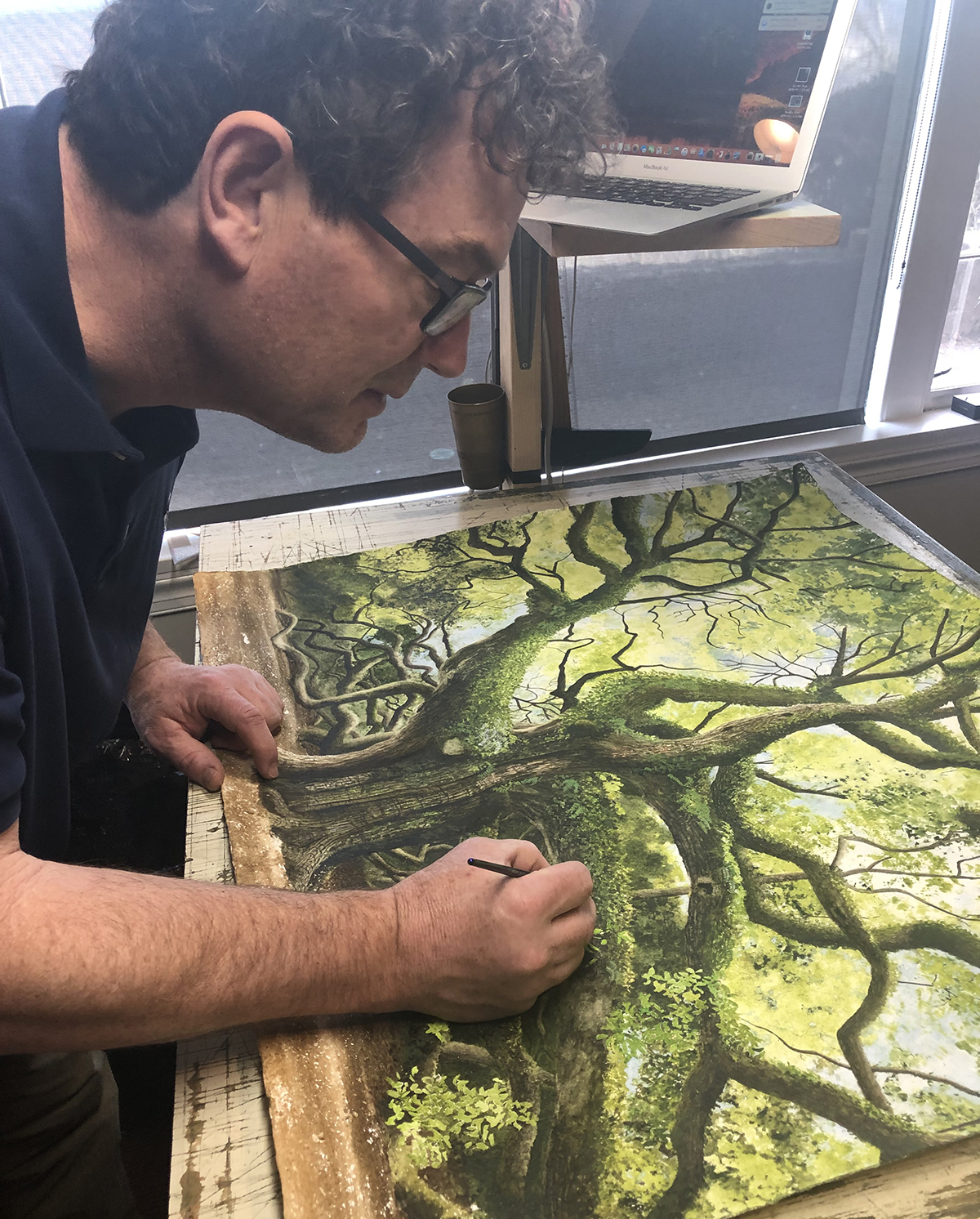
Alan Shuptrine Painting Angel Tree

Alan Shuptrine (born March 31, 1963) is an American painter, frame-maker, water gilder, and watercolorist based in the Appalachian Mountains. He is the son of painter Hubert Shuptrine (1936–2006).

== Biography ==
=== Early life and education ===
Shuptrine was raised in more than 20 Appalachian Mountain towns along the Eastern seaboard. His father, Hubert, traveled all over the South for his inspirations, and would often take him along, becoming his mentor and teacher. Shuptrine attended school at the Baylor School, The University of the South, and the University of Tennessee.

=== Career ===
Shuptrine began his own company for framing, art restoration, and gold leafing called Gold Leaf Designs, which he runs with his wife. In 2005, following the devastation from Hurricane Katrina, the New Orleans Museum of Art employed Shuptrine to make on-site repairs and restorations of the frames and gilded objects within the permanent collection.

Though framing and restoration became a primary focus, Shuptrine continued to paint and be mentored by his father. He works within the realism style of art, much like his father, and mainly paints with watercolor. His works are detailed and often use dramatic lighting. He also creates using egg tempera, oil paint, water gilding with genuine gold leaf, wood carving, and sgraffito.

Shuptrine participated in the exhibit, "In the Tradition of Wyeth: Contemporary Watercolor Masters", at the Vero Beach Museum of Art in 2010, which displayed his and his father's works alongside Andrew Wyeth's. Following the Vero Beach exhibition, Shuptrine participated in a solo exhibition, Alan Shuptrine: Appalachian Watercolors of the Serpentine Chain. His solo exhibition opened at the Tennessee State Museum in Nashville and celebrated Celtic roots in the Appalachian Mountains. It was displayed at the Morris Museum of Art, the Huntsville Museum of Art and The Tennessee State Museum.

In 2018, Shuptrine collaborated with author and Appalachian Trail expert Jennifer Pharr Davis. Together they created the self-published book titled I Come From A Place. This book contains a collection of images from Shuptrine's museum exhibition, as well as newer watercolors. The book was awarded the Independent Publisher's Book Award for Best Southeastern Non-Fiction Book for 2020.

=== Personal life ===
Shuptrine and his wife Bonny reside in Lookout Mountain, Georgia. They own Shuptrine's Gallery, located in the Broad Street Design District in Chattanooga, Tennessee.

== Awards and recognitions ==
- Distinguished Alumnus Award, The Baylor School, Chattanooga, TN, 2021
