= Nutribun =

Bread product

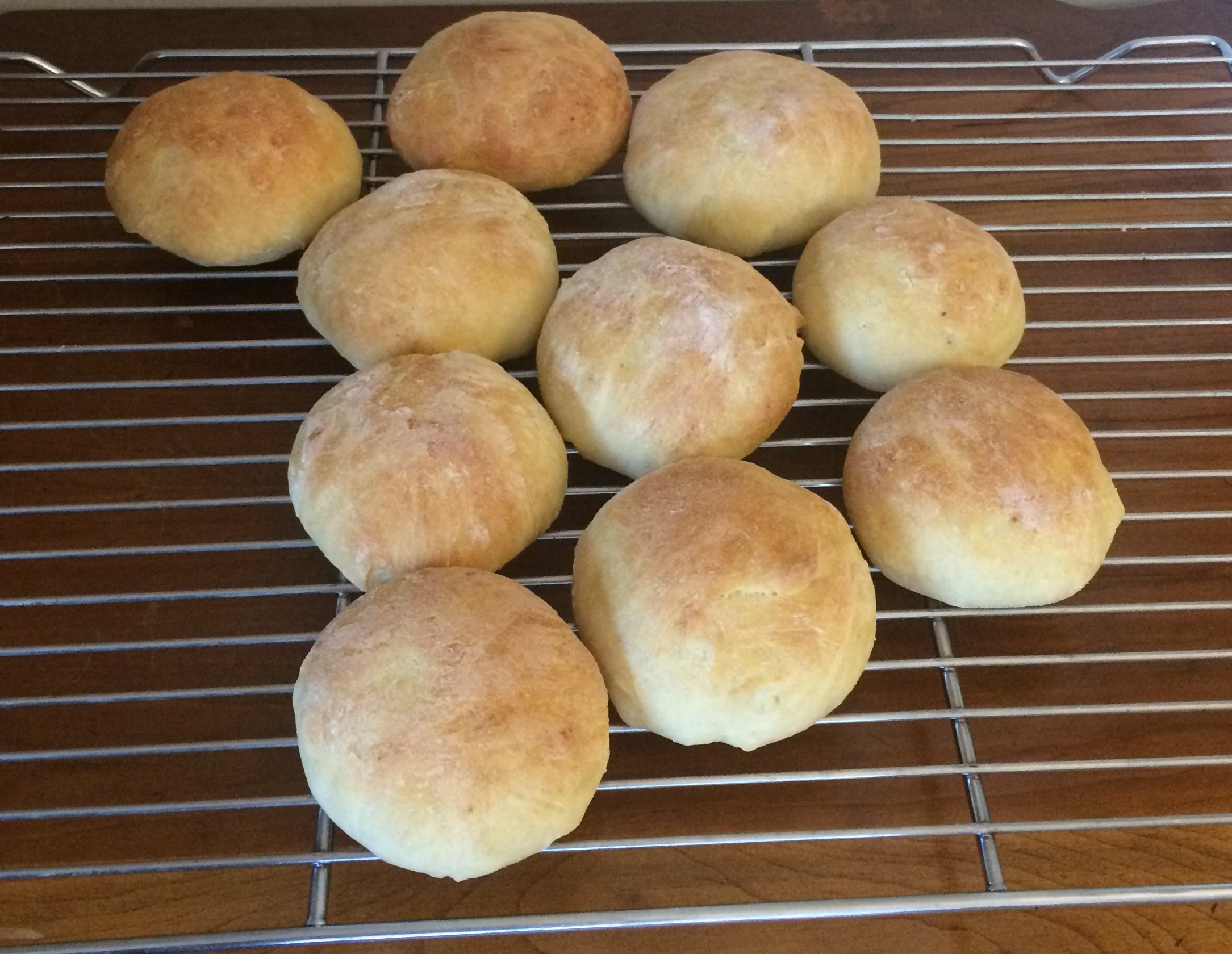
- Nutribuns
- Alternative names: Nutri-bun, Nutriban
- Type: Bread
- Place of origin: United States
- Created by: United States Agency for International Development (USAID)
- Main ingredients: Whole wheat flour, non-fat dried milk powder, soy flour, iodized salt
- Food energy (per 80 grams (2.8 oz) serving): 400 kcal (1,700 kJ)
- Similar dishes: Pandesal
- Other information: Given especially to children.

Nutribun, also referred to as Nutri-bun or Nutriban, is a bread product used in elementary school feeding programs in the Philippines to combat child malnutrition, initially as part of the United States Agency for International Development (USAID)'s Food for Peace program from 1971 to 1997, and later as part of the child health programs of various Philippine cities.

The base bread of the original 1971–1997 program was designed at the Virginia Polytechnic Institute and State University between 1968 and 1970. It was made of a wheat blend flour and non-fat dried milk donated by the United States under the PL 480 Title II Food Aid.

== Development ==
Nutribun was developed by a team of nutritionists and agrarian experts at the Virginia Polytechnic Institute and State University between 1968 and 1970 and "was designed as a convenient 'ready-to-eat complete meal' for public elementary school feeding programmes to combat child malnutrition in the Philippines." In addition to requiring the bread to be well fortified with nutrients, USAID also requested that the product be easy to augment using local ingredients, such as moringa leaf powder ("malunggay"), squash, banana powder and eggs in the Philippines.

== Ingredients ==
The 'base' of the bread is made from a blend of white and whole wheat flour mixed with yeast and a non-fat dried milk powder, although banana flour and coconut may also be used. In the Philippines, the bread may be fortified with soy flour as a protein source, or – as reported in 2019 – moringa leaf powder, squash, eggs, sugar, and salt may be used as main ingredients, with attention given to flavor and texture to avoid organoleptic problems. The wheat, milk, soy, moringa, and egg ingredients supply micronutrients, such as calcium, iron, and B vitamins. The bun is made with iodized salt as a means of supplying iodine and sodium to the diet. Each bun weighs 80 grams and contains 400 calories.

== Distribution ==
As Ferdinand Marcos's first term as president of the Philippines neared its end in the late 1960s, the rate of malnutrition soared, especially among young children.

Faced by a balance of payments triggered by massive campaign-related infrastructure spending, the administration drew upon Official Development Assistance (ODA)—in the form of the United States' Food for Peace Program—to start a five-year nutrition program, eventually named Operation Timbang, in 1971.

Starting in 1972, USAID began providing the Philippine government with thousands of loaves of Nutribun in addition to hundreds of tons of dried milk powder. The Philippine government took advantage of Nutribun's flexible recipe and added domestically produced banana and plantain powder to the list of ingredients. The government took over production of the bread in 1975, though shipments of ingredients still arrived from USAID. Imelda Marcos claimed credit for Nutribuns when she had bags, filled with Nutribuns, stamped with "Courtesy of Imelda Marcos-Tulungan Project", even though they were donations by USAID and other local donors.

== Impact and eventual phaseout ==
Nutribun grew in popularity in the country due to its similarity to pan de sal, which remained the most consumed bread in the island nation. After the introduction of Nutribun and the implementation of a nationwide food distribution program, the rate of malnutrition in the Philippines fell drastically. From 1971 to 1973, severe malnutrition in children was reduced from five percent to less than one percent. The Nutribuns were often distributed before school and were served with milk.

Following the decrease in the rate of malnutrition in the Philippines, the program was gradually phased out, with the final batches of Nutribun being distributed in 1997.

== Revival ==
In 2014, the rising cost of food and increase in malnutrition cases in Manila led to the Nutribun program being reinstated, with the buns going back into limited production.

In August 2019, Marikina Mayor Marcelino Teodoro reinstated Nutribun when city officials noticed that some public school students were undernourished, and "offering them Nutribun could provide them with proper nutrition".

The COVID-19 pandemic also spurred some Filipino communities to put Nutribun back into production. During the pandemic, one Philippine company began by producing 10,000 buns per day, and later increased production to 24,000 buns per day. In July 2020, the Philippines government announced enhancements to Nutribun quality and nutritional value, including better texture and taste by using squash as a primary ingredient and the addition of iron and vitamin A.

== Program in Jamaica ==
As of 2012, the government of Jamaica maintained a Nutribun program in which the buns were distributed to schoolchildren.

== See also ==
- Plumpy'nut
- Famine relief
- Soylent (meal replacement)
