= Myron Avery =

American lawyer, hiker and explorer

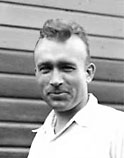
Myron Avery

Myron Haliburton Avery (November 3, 1899–July 26, 1952) was an American lawyer, hiker and explorer. Born in Lubec, Maine, Avery was a protégé of Judge Arthur Perkins and a collaborator and sometimes rival of Benton MacKaye. He was president of the Potomac Appalachian Trail Club from 1927 to 1941 and chairman of the Appalachian Trail Conference from 1931 to his death in 1952. The first 2000 Miler of the Appalachian Trail, he was also an alumnus of Bowdoin College and Harvard Law School.

Upon graduating from Harvard Law School, Avery practised admiralty law with the law firm "Arthur Perkins", in Hartford, Maine. He was a Naval veteran, having served in both World War I and World War II, receiving the Legion of Merit during his service.

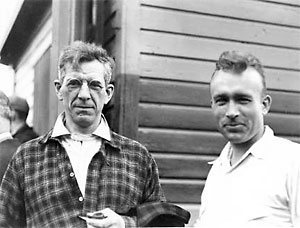
Benton MacKaye and Myron Avery (right)

According to Philip D'Anieri, Avery got the Appalachian Trail built "with a focus and commitment that were almost inexplicably intense. Avery was driven to arrange things as he was certain they should be, not out of ego or hubris, it seems, but from an almost desperate need to do things the right way, which happened to be his way, and why on earth couldn't others see that when it was obvious?....The building of the Appalachian Trail, for Myron Avery, seemed to achieve no broader purpose than the fact of its own completion: two ends connected; a trail blazed, cleared, and improved, shelters built; measurements made; and all of the associated date published in an appropriate format."

After World War II, his health deteriorated—perhaps because of his "pathological intensity"—and he was hospitalized multiple times. He died suddenly on July 26, 1952, at the age of 52.

== Legacy ==
After his death, a mountaintop on the Appalachian Trail in Maine was renamed "Avery Peak" in his honor. The "east peak" of Bigelow Mountain is given as 4088 ft and identified as Myron H Avery Peak on the 1956 Stratton, Maine 15 minute Quadrangle issued by the USGS in Washington D.C. A lean-to was built below the peak's summit and named for him in 1953, but is now no longer standing.

On June 17, 2011, he was inducted into the Appalachian Trail Hall of Fame at the Appalachian Trail Museum as a charter member.

== Quotations ==
"To those who would see the Maine wilderness, tramp day by day through a succession of ever delightful forest, past lake and stream, and over mountains, we would say: Follow the Appalachian Trail across Maine. It cannot be followed on horse or awheel. Remote for detachment, narrow for chosen company, winding for leisure, lonely for contemplation, it beckons not merely north and south but upward to the body, mind and soul of man." - Myron Avery, In the Maine Woods, 1934

== Sources ==
- Anderson, Larry. 2002. Benton MacKaye: Conservationist, Planner, and Creator of the Appalachian Trail. Johns Hopkins University Press. ISBN 0-8018-7791-1.
- Luxenberg, Larry. 1995. Walking the Appalachian Trail. Stackpole Books. ISBN 0-8117-3095-6.
