= Research Institute for Development =

French science and technology institute

Institut de Recherche pour le Développement
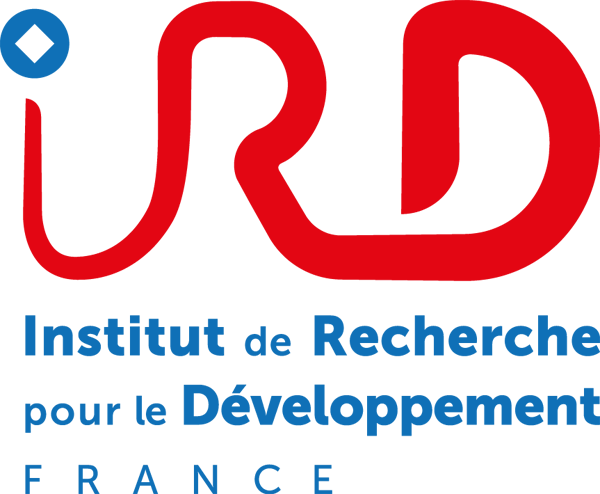
- Formation: 1937; 89 years ago
- Type: Governmental organisation
- Purpose: Development of southern countries
- Headquarters: Marseille
- Official language: French
- Chairman of the Board and Chief Executive Officer: Valérie Verdier
- Main organ: Direction générale déléguée à la Science
- Budget: €239 million
- Staff: 2,354
- Website: en.ird.fr

The French National Research Institute for Sustainable Development, or Institut de Recherche pour le Développement (IRD), is a French science and technology establishment under the joint supervision of the French Ministries of Higher Education and Research and Foreign Affairs. It operates internationally from its headquarters in Marseille, and two metropolitan centres of Montpellier and Bondy. It was created as the Office de la recherche scientifique et technique outre-mer or ORSTOM (Overseas Scientific and Technical Research Office) in 1943.

== Missions ==
The IRD institute has three main missions: research on developing countries and French overseas territories development, overseas consultancy and training.

It conducts scientific programs contributing to the sustainable development of the countries of the South, with an emphasis on the relationship between man and the environment.

Since 1955, the Institute has maintained an institutional archive to preserve and disseminate its scientific productions. The Institute develops an open access policy for its documents. The archive currently contains over 96,000 documents and constitutes the IRD documentary collection (FDI "Fonds Documentaire IRD").

== Organisation ==
The IRD's scientific activities are organised through five scientific departments coordinated by a deputy director for science:

- Dynamics of the Internal and Surface of Continents (DISCO);
- Ecology, Biodiversity and Functioning of Continental Ecosystems (ECOBIO);
- Oceans, Climate and Resources (OCEANS);
- Health and Societies (SAS);
- Societies and Globalization (SOC).

IRD has established new scientific cooperation bodies in recent years that promote co-construction of research projects. These structures provide funding and autonomy to associated young research teams (JEAI), Mixed International Laboratories (LMI), Mixed International Units (UMI), and International Research Laboratory Networks (GDRI). Additionally, these programs encourage collaborations between countries in the global South.

IRD is also a public scientific publisher. IRD Éditions publishes interdisciplinary and multilingual works (in French, English, Spanish, Portuguese, Arabic and Vietnamese), designed for a range of audiences (both scientific and non-scientific).

== Associated people ==
A number of notable researchers are or have been associated with Institut de recherche pour le développement, including:

- Jean Marie Bosser - botanist and agronomical engineer
- André Briend - pediatric nutritionist
- Jean-Philippe Chippaux - snakebite and tropical medicine expert
- Jean-Paul Gonzalez - virologist
- Khadijetou Lekweiry - virologist
- Michel Luc - nematologist
- Denis Vidal - anthropologist

== See also ==
- Developing country
- Bactris nancibaensis
- Serer people
- Mistrals
