= Famine relief =

Organized effort to provide food to an undernourished population

Famine relief is an organized effort to reduce starvation in a region in which there is famine. A famine is a phenomenon in which a large proportion of the population of a region or country are so undernourished that death by starvation becomes increasingly common. In spite of the much greater technological and economic resources of the modern world, famine still strikes many parts of the world, mostly in the developing nations.

Today, conflict is the biggest famine driver according to the World Food Programme, while climate change and the fallout of COVID-19 are contributing to sharply increasing hunger numbers. Measures to curb the spread of COVID-19 have hit economies worldwide, pushing millions into unemployment and poverty, and leaving governments and donors with fewer resources to address the food and nutritional needs of those most vulnerable. Modern relief agencies categorize various gradations of famine according to a famine scale.

Many areas that suffered famines in the past have protected themselves through technological and social development. The first area in Europe to eliminate famine was the Netherlands, which saw its last peacetime famines in the early 17th century as it became a major economic power and established a complex political organization. A prominent economist on the subject, Nobel laureate Amartya Sen, has noted that no functioning democracy has ever suffered a famine, although he admits that malnutrition can occur in a democracy and he does not consider mid-19th century Ireland to be a functioning democracy.

The bulk of the world's food aid is given to people in areas where poverty is endemic; to people who have suffered due to a natural disaster other than famine (such as the victims of the 2004 Indian Ocean tsunami); and to people who have lost their crops due to conflicts (such as in the Darfur region of Sudan). Only a small amount of food aid goes to people who are suffering as a direct consequence of famine.

== Methods ==
In his book on famine, Fred Cuny stated that "the chances of saving lives at the outset of a relief operation are greatly reduced when food is imported. By the time it arrives in the country and gets to people, many will have died." He went on to say that "evidence suggests the massive food shipments sent to Somalia in 1992 had little impact on the outcome of the famine... and that by the time it arrived in sufficient, steady quantities in the rural areas, the death rate had peaked and was already declining." – Andrew S. Natsios (Administrator U.S. Agency for International Development)

There was a growing realization among aid groups that giving cash or cash vouchers, instead of food is a cheaper, faster, and more efficient way to deliver help to the hungry, particularly in areas in which food is available but unaffordable. In a major endorsement of the approach around 2008, the UN's World Food Programme (WFP), the biggest non-governmental distributor of food, announced that it would begin distributing cash and vouchers instead of food in some areas. Josette Sheeran, the WFP's executive director, described the plan as a "revolution" in food aid.

However, for people in a drought living far from markets or limited access to them, delivering sacks of grain and tins of oil may be the most appropriate way to help. Fred Cuny further pointed out, "Studies of every recent famine have shown that food was available in-country – though not always in the immediate food deficit area. Usually, merchants begin hoarding food as a crisis develops – in conflicts, to keep it from being stolen, in famines, to get higher prices. Even though by local standards the prices are too high for the poor to purchase it, it would usually be cheaper for a donor to buy the hoarded food at the inflated price than to import it from abroad." from memorandum to former Representative Steve Solarz (United States, Democratic Party, New York) – July 1994. The Irish aid agency Concern is piloting a method through a mobile phone operator, Safaricom, which runs a money transfer program that allows cash to be sent from one part of the country to another. Concern donated more than $30,000 for distribution via cellphone to some of Kenya's poorest people so that they can buy local food.

In the past four years, Ethiopia has been pioneering a program that has now become part of the World Bank's prescribed recipe for coping with a food crisis and, as a result, it had been seen by aid organizations as a model of how to best help hungry nations. Through the country's main food assistance program, the Productive Safety Net Program, Ethiopia has been giving rural residents who are chronically short of food, a chance to work for food or cash. In addition, foreign aid organizations like the WFP were then able to buy food locally from surplus areas to distribute in areas with a shortage of food. Since then, the percentage of Ethiopians living in poverty dropped to 39 percent in 2006 from 44 percent in 2001, according to the World Bank.

== Temporary therapeutic foods ==
Malnutrition is a medical condition, not just a lack of food. The bodies of severely malnourished humans, especially children, are unable to process regular food. Instead of being fed food such as rice or porridge, patients are fed therapeutic food for up to one month, or until their bodies are able to process traditional foods. There are two main types of therapeutic foods in use: powdered formulas (F-75, F-100, BP-100) to be prepared with clean water and to be used only under supervision; and ready-to-eat peanut paste formulations (Plumpy'nut, Plumpy'doz, eeZeePaste RUTF) which can be used at home without supervision.

- F-75 (phase 1 therapeutic milk): a milk-based powder to be prepared with clean water, given to severely malnourished children when they first arrive for treatment. It is normally given for one to three days, but in cases of kwashiorkor it can be given for a maximum of seven days. It is not intended to cause the child to gain weight, but only to condition the body to digest food.
- F-100 (phase 2 therapeutic milk): a milk-based powder to be prepared with clean water. It contains more protein and calories than F-75, and is designed for rapid weight gain, and to prepare the body for digestion of normal food. It has been criticized as ineffective compared to ready-to-use therapeutic peanut-paste-based foods.
- BP-100 (phase 2 therapeutic food): a wheat-based powder to be used in a similar manner to F-100.
- Plumpy'nut, Plumpy'doz, eeZeePaste RUTF: various ready-to-eat mixtures of peanut paste, milk powder, sugar, fats, minerals and vitamins, to be used as an alternative to F-100. The products come in ready-to-eat packets that require no water or mixing. They put parents or guardians in charge of feeding their own malnourished children in their own communities, rather than forcing them to always bring their malnourished children to hospitals or therapeutic feeding centers for assistance. The Wall Street Journal noted, "Nutritionists for the first time can take treatment beyond crowded emergency feeding centers and hospitals settings, where disease can spread rapidly, and into communities where malnourished children live."

After the malnourished children recover enough to be able to digest complex foods, products containing higher levels of protein can be used to increase muscle growth. Plant protein foods such as textured vegetable protein have been advocated. Besides containing high amounts of protein, they also have a long shelf life and are inexpensive. Also, similar to tofu, plant protein can be manufactured in a more sustainable way than animal protein. This is an important question in areas such as Darfur, where cattle farming contributes to constant destruction of arable farmland.

== Modern relief ==
Today, the Peace Corps, religious groups, and charities feed hungry people all over the world, especially in countries hardest hit by famine. In addition to giving them food, they teach the hungry to grow their own food crops, so that they can feed themselves. In some environments (such as the desert, rocky areas, or cold wastelands) farming is difficult to impossible. Such land is called unarable. This is why famine repeats in those areas. New methods have been invented to grow food crops in these difficult areas. These new methods include: nitrogen fertilizer, hybrid food crops, digging wells, reverse osmosis water processors to turn salty ocean water into fresh water, greenhouses, hydroponics, canal digging, dirt hill walls stacking for protection against wind and dust, mylar insulation, and sustainable agriculture.

== See also ==
- "Famine, Affluence, and Morality"
- Food security
- Food and Agriculture Organization
- Oxfam
- Action Against Hunger
- Nutribun
