= Appalachian Long Distance Hikers Association =

Hiking Association

The Appalachian Long Distance Hikers Association is a non-profit organization founded in 1983 to support and promote the interests of long-distance hikers in the Appalachian mountain area and east of the Mississippi. It "was the first organization of long-distance hikers in the United States".

== Activities ==
The ALDHA authors the annual Appalachian Trail Thru-Hikers' Companion, a guide to hiking the Appalachian Trail (A.T.). It also publishes a monthly email newsletter, The Blaze.

The ALDHA Gathering is an annual event with hiking- and trail-oriented workshops about trails worldwide. It is held over Columbus Day weekend and has hundreds of experienced hikers in attendance.

=== Backpacker ethics education ===
In 1990 the ALDHA published of a list of behavioral expectations for hikers staying in hostels to prevent problems and improve public perception of A.T. backpackers.

Since 1995, the "Endangered Services Campaign" has provided backpacker etiquette education and encouraged hikers to "act responsibly when they are in trail towns as well as on the trail." One slogan in the campaign was "Just because you live in the woods doesn't mean you can act like an animal."

The "Hike In Harmony" campaign uses the yin and yang symbol with boot footprints and distills and adapts Leave No Trace principles into three basic ethics rules for A.T. backpackers:

- "Leave no trace in trail towns, not just in camp."
- "Follow the rules as you would the white blazes."
- "Help keep the Appalachian Trail a good neighbor."

== See also ==
- Appalachian Trail Conservancy
- Appalachian Trail Museum
- Leave No Trace
