= Appalachian Trail Conservancy =

U.S. nonprofit organisation

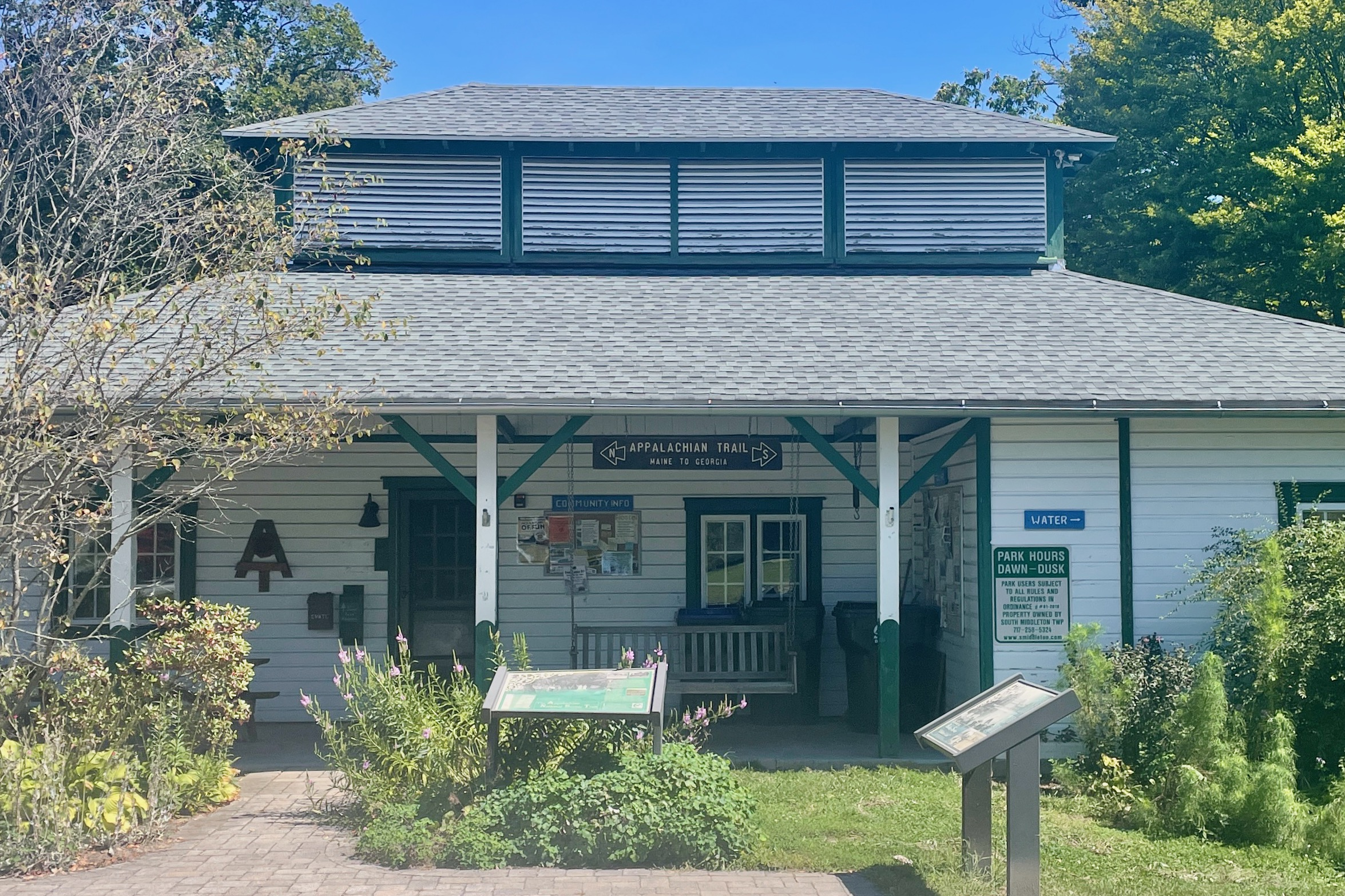
- ATC visitor center in Boiling Springs, Pennsylvania
- Abbreviation: ATC
- Formation: March 2–3, 1925
- Type: Nonprofit organization
- Purpose: Conservation and management of the Appalachian Trail
- Headquarters: Harpers Ferry, West Virginia, United States
- Region served: Eastern United States
- Key people: Sandi Marra (President)
- Formerly called: Appalachian Trail Conference

The Appalachian Trail Conservancy (ATC; formerly Appalachian Trail Conference) is a nonprofit organization dedicated to the conservation of the Appalachian Trail, a route in the eastern United States that runs from Maine to Georgia. Founded in 1925, the ATC is responsible for the day-to-day management of the Appalachian Trail under a cooperative agreement executed with the National Park Service. It is the lead non-governmental organization for protecting the trail's 2,193 miles (3,529 km), 250,000-acre (1,000 km^{2}) greenway and coordinates the work of 31 maintenance clubs who perform almost all trail maintenance. The National Trails System Act, which established the National Trails System and brought the Appalachian Trail into the federal estate, enabled the trail to be managed as it had been since 1925, with central agency and NGO (ATC) coordination, but most trail work being performed by, in 2019, almost 6,000 volunteers.

The ATC headquarters are in Harpers Ferry, West Virginia, and its president is Sandi Marra.

== History ==
The Appalachian Trail was originally conceived by forester Benton MacKaye who envisioned a grand trail that would connect a series of farms and wilderness work/study camps for city-dwellers. In 1922, at the suggestion of Major William A. Welch, director of the Palisades Interstate Park Commission, MacKaye's plan was publicized by Raymond H. Torrey with a story in the New York Evening Post under a full page banner headline reading "A Great Trail from Maine to Georgia!"; the trail component of MacKaye's proposal was quickly adopted by the new Palisades Interstate Park Trail Conference as their main project, and on January 4, 1924, the first twenty-mile (32 km) stretch from the Hudson to the Ramapo Rivers was complete. The entire trail was connected in 1937, though almost every section has been relocated from their original locations to improve footpath sustainability or provide better protection from development or encroachments.

The ATC was formed in Washington, D.C., on March 2 and 3, 1925, with Major Welch as chairman and Torrey as treasurer. In 1927, Welch was replaced by Judge Arthur Perkins and in 1928, J. Ashton Allis became Treasurer.

In 1929, Perkins recruited Ned Anderson to blaze the Connecticut leg of the trail. This section is a 50-mile stretch through the northwest corner of the state from Dog Tail Corners in Webatuck, New York, to Bear Mountain at the Massachusetts border. Anderson worked dually as a section manager for both the Connecticut Forest & Park Association and the ATC. With his volunteers, he continued to maintain the trail until his retirement in 1948. Today, that section of the trail is maintained by the Appalachian Mountain Club.

== Activities ==
The ATC is committed not only to trail maintenance and large-scale landscape conservation, but also to education, science, and awareness. The trail's size, uniqueness, and environmental effects of it and on it can provide valuable insights and advances for science and ecology. The ATC currently has a MEGA-Transect scientific study underway, which will use data collected (species of flora, fauna, wildlife, weather/climate effects and more) to provide critical information toward preservation on a global scale. The Conservancy strives to heighten awareness via the "ATC's Community Recognition Program" or "Trail Towns" program that recognizes and highlights the communities through which the trail's 2,000 miles run. As well, the ATC's "A Trail To Every Classroom" is a school program that utilized the trail to teach students about conservation, preservation, earth science and ecology.

== Halfway point pictures ==
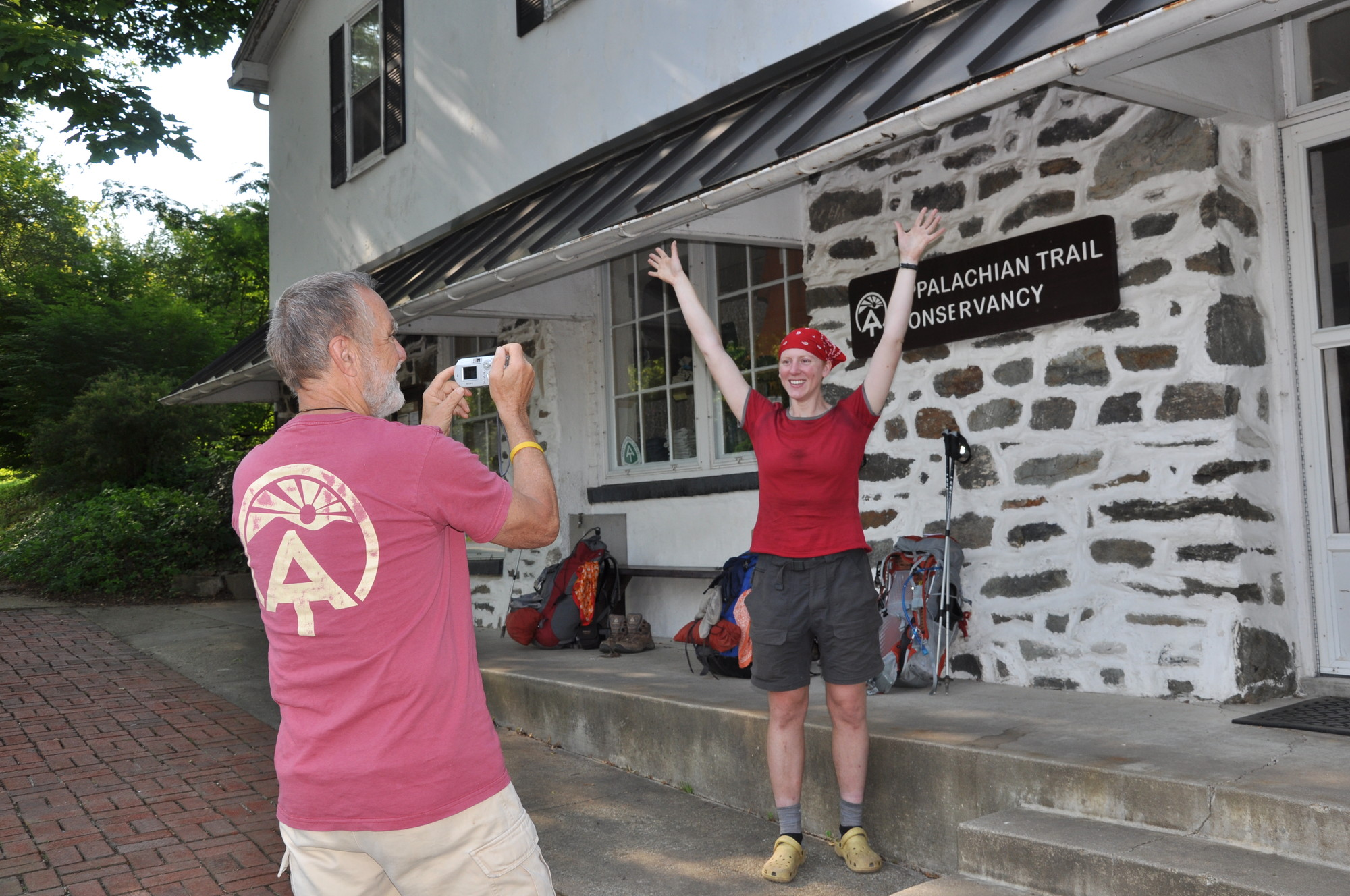
Hiker being photographed at ATC for the thru-hiker album

Because the ATC Headquarters in Harpers Ferry is located roughly at the halfway point of the Appalachian Trail, a photograph at ATC headquarters is a standard ritual for hikers intending to walk the entire path. One of the functions of the ATC, as the lead organization in managing and protecting the A.T., is to maintain the official 2,000-miler registry of all those who have completed the A.T. Another, less official function, is the documentation of hikers who reach the halfway point. These hikers, whether hiking Northbound, Southbound, or Section hiking (completing portions in multiple trips) almost universally stop by the ATC headquarters for a few minutes. Having a simple Polaroid under the ATC sign after hiking 1,000 miles is a milestone anticipated by many hikers. The pictures are signed and numbered in the order the hikers arrive. Although hikers are not entered into the official 2,000-miler registry until completing the full Appalachian Trail, the ritual is nonetheless a memorable recognition of their progress.

== Notable affiliated trail maintenance clubs ==
- Appalachian Mountain Club (AMC)
- Dartmouth Outing Club
- Georgia Appalachian Trail Club
- Green Mountain Club
- Maine Appalachian Trail Club
- New York–New Jersey Trail Conference
- Potomac Appalachian Trail Club

== See also ==
- Appalachian Development Highway System (ADHS) (in the eastern US)
- Appalachian Long Distance Hikers Association
