= Index of Georgia (U.S. state)-related articles =

The location of the state of Georgia in the United States of America

The following is an alphabetical list of articles related to the U.S. state of Georgia.

== 0–9 ==
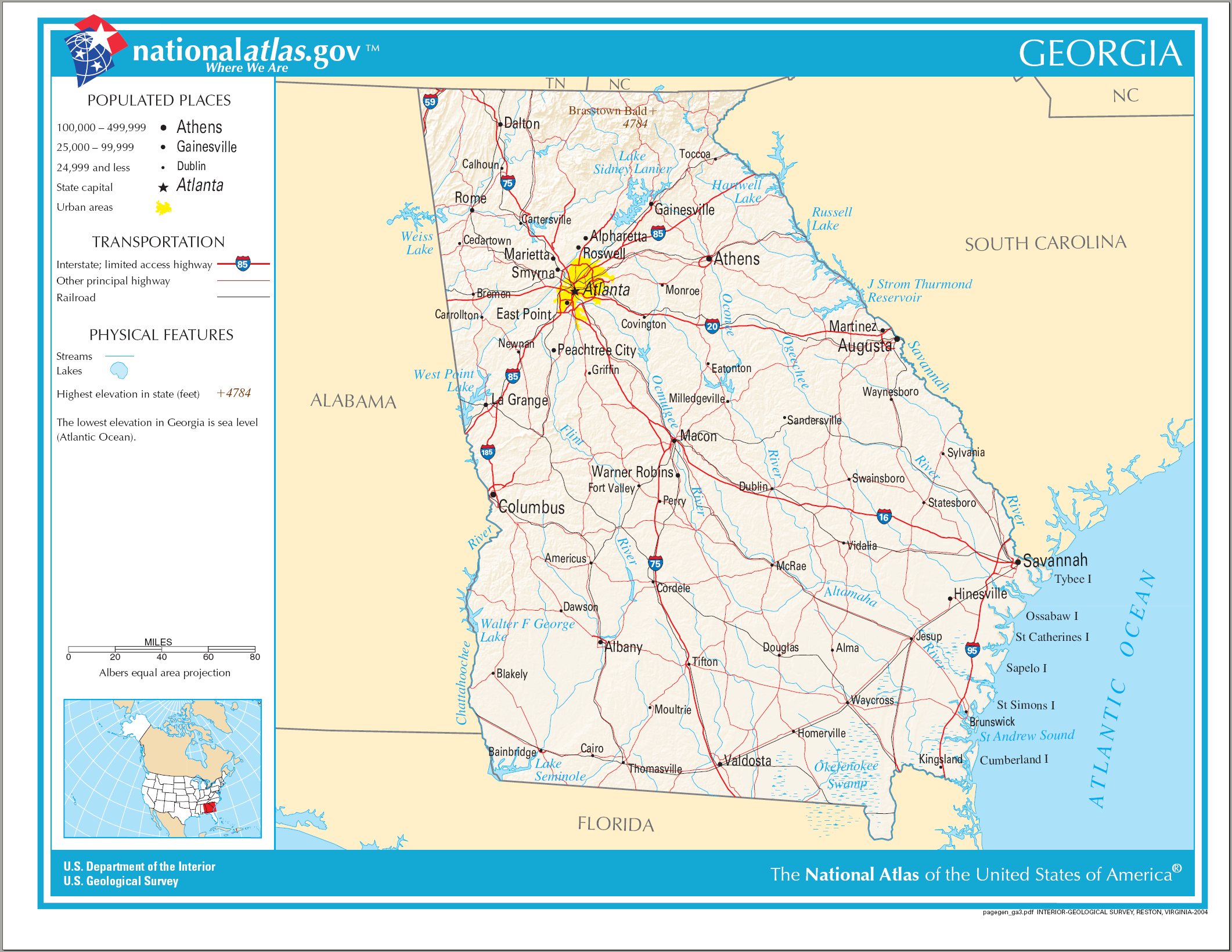
An enlargeable map of the state of Georgia

- .ga.us – Internet second-level domain for the state of Georgia
- 4th state to ratify the Constitution of the United States

== A ==
- Adams-Onís Treaty of 1819
- Adjacent states:
  - State of Alabama
  - State of Florida
  - State of North Carolina
  - State of South Carolina
  - State of Tennessee
- Agriculture in the state of Georgia
- Airports in the state of Georgia
- Alpharetta, GA
- Amusement parks in the state of Georgia
- Appalachia
- Appling County, Georgia
- Aquaria in the state of Georgia
  - commons:Category:Aquaria in Georgia (U.S. state)
- Arboreta in the state of Georgia
  - commons:Category:Arboreta in Georgia (U.S. state)
- Archaeology in the state of Georgia
  - Category:Archaeological sites in Georgia (U.S. state)
    - commons:Category:Archaeological sites in Georgia (U.S. state)
- Architecture in the state of Georgia
- Area codes in the state of Georgia
- Art museums and galleries in the state of Georgia
  - commons:Category:Art museums and galleries in Georgia (U.S. state)
- Atkinson County, Georgia
- Atlanta, Georgia, state capital since 1868
- Atlanta metropolitan area largest urban center in Georgia, ninth largest in the United States
- Augusta, Georgia, state capital 1779–1780, 1781–1782, and 1786–1796

== B ==
- Bacon County, Georgia
- Baker County, Georgia
- Baldwin County, Georgia
- Banks County, Georgia
- Barrow County, Georgia
- Bartow County, Georgia
- Battle of Adairsville
- Battle of Allatoona
- Battle of Atlanta
- Battle of Brown's Mill
- Battle of Chickamauga
- Battle of Columbus (1865)
- Battle of Dallas
- Battle of Davis' Cross Roads
- Battle of Ezra Church
- Battle of Fort McAllister (1863)
- Battle of Fort McAllister (1864)
- Battle of Griswoldville
- Battle of Jonesborough
- Battle of Kennesaw Mountain
- Battle of Kolb's Farm
- Battle of Lovejoy's Station
- Battle of Marietta
- Battle of New Hope Church
- Battle of Noonday Creek
- Battle of Peachtree Creek
- Battle of Pickett's Mill
- Battle of Rensaca
- Battle of Ringgold Gap
- Battle of Rocky Face Ridge
- Battle of Rome Cross Roads
- Battle of Ruff's Station
- Battle of Utoy Creek
- Battle of Wassaw Sound
- Battle of Wauhatchie
- Battle of Waynesboro, Georgia
- Battle of West Point
- Ben Hill County, Georgia
- Berrien County, Georgia
- Bibb County, Georgia
- Black Belt
- Bleckley County, Georgia
- Brantley County, Georgia
- Brooks County, Georgia
- Botanical gardens in the state of Georgia
  - commons:Category:Botanical gardens in Georgia (U.S. state)
- Brasstown Valley Resort
- Bryan County, Georgia
- Buildings and structures in the state of Georgia
  - commons:Category:Buildings and structures in Georgia (U.S. state)
- Bulloch County, Georgia
- Burke County, Georgia
- Butts County, Georgia

== C ==
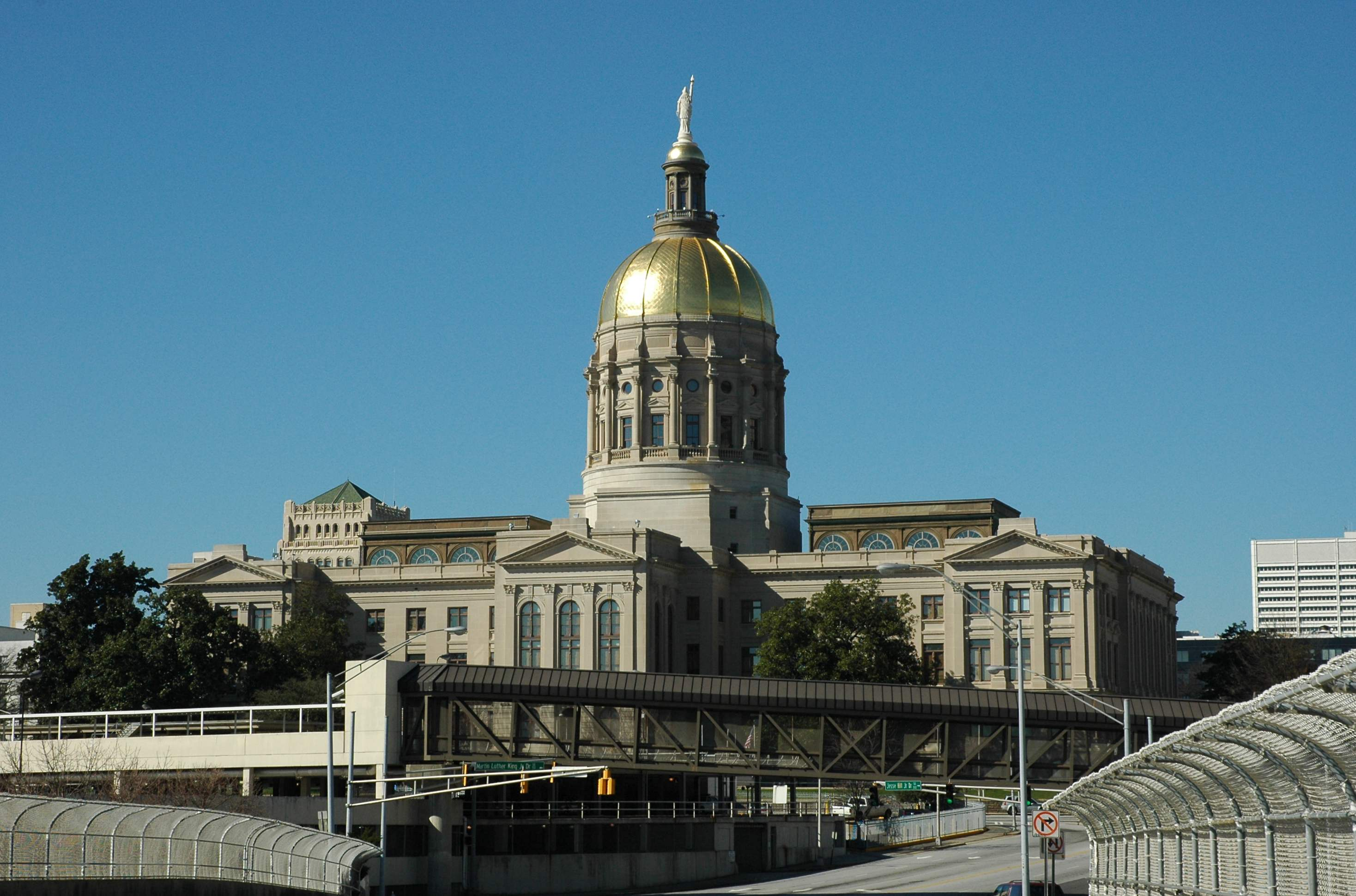
The Georgia State Capitol in Atlanta

- Calhoun County, Georgia
- Camden County, Georgia
- Candler County, Georgia
- Canyons and gorges of the state of Georgia
  - commons:Category:Canyons and gorges of Georgia (U.S. state)
- Capital of the state of Georgia
- Georgia State Capitol
  - commons:Category:Georgia State Capitol
- Carroll County, Georgia
- Catoosa County, Georgia
- Census statistical areas of the State of Georgia
- Charlton County, Georgia
- Chatham County, Georgia
- Chattahoochee County, Georgia
- Chattooga County, Georgia
- Cherokee County, Georgia
- Cities in the state of Georgia
  - commons:Category:Cities in Georgia (U.S. state)
- Clarke County, Georgia
- Clay County, Georgia
- Clayton County, Georgia
- Clinch County, Georgia
- Climate of the state of Georgia
  - Category:Climate of Georgia (U.S. state)
    - commons:Category:Climate of Georgia (U.S. state)
- Climate change in Georgia
- Cobb County, Georgia
- Coffee County, Georgia
- Colleges and universities in the state of Georgia
  - commons:Category:Universities and colleges in Georgia (U.S. state)
- Colony of Georgia, 1732–1755

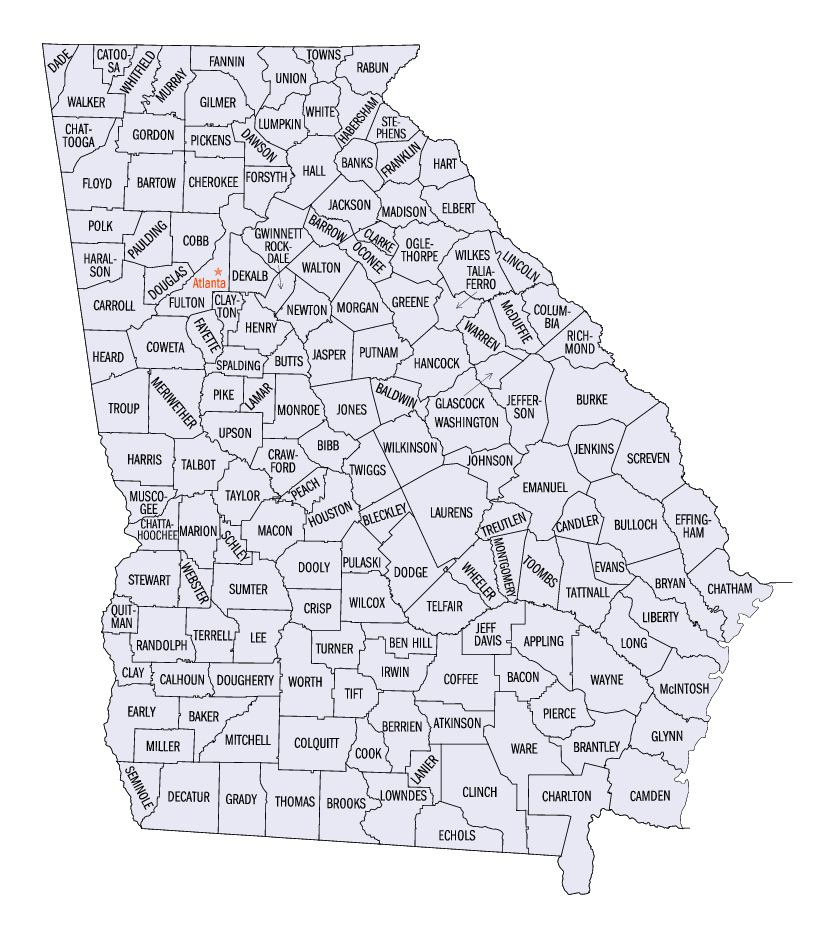
An enlargeable map of the 159 counties of the state of Georgia

- Colquitt County, Georgia
- Columbia County, Georgia
- Cook County, Georgia
- Communications in the state of Georgia
  - commons:Category:Communications in Georgia (U.S. state)
- Companies in the state of Georgia
  - Category:Companies based in Georgia (U.S. state)
- Congressional districts of the state of Georgia
- Constitution of the State of Georgia
- Convention centers in the state of Georgia
  - commons:Category:Convention centers in Georgia (U.S. state)
- Counties of the state of Georgia
  - commons:Category:Counties in Georgia (U.S. state)
- Coweta County, Georgia
- Crawford County, Georgia
- Crisp County, Georgia
- Culture of the state of Georgia
  - Category:Culture of Georgia (U.S. state)
    - commons:Category:Georgia (U.S. state) culture

== D ==
- Dade County, Georgia
- Dawson County, Georgia
- Decatur County, Georgia
- DeKalb County, Georgia
- Demographics of the State of Georgia
- Dodge County, Georgia
- Dooly County, Georgia
- Dougherty County, Georgia
- Douglas County, Georgia

== E ==
- Early County, Georgia
- Ebenezer, Georgia, state capital 1782-1784
- Echols County, Georgia
- Economy of the State of Georgia
  - Category:Economy of Georgia (U.S. state)
    - commons:Category:Economy of Georgia (U.S. state)
- Education in the State of Georgia
  - Category:Education in Georgia (U.S. state)
    - commons:Category:Education in Georgia (U.S. state)
- Effingham County, Georgia
- Elbert County, Georgia
- Elections of the State of Georgia
  - commons:Category:Elections in Georgia (U.S. state)
- Emanuel County, Georgia
- Environment of the State of Georgia
  - commons:Category:Environment of Georgia (U.S. state)
- Evans County, Georgia

== F ==
- Fannin County, Georgia
- Fayette County, Georgia

The flag of the state of Georgia

- Festivals in the state of Georgia
  - commons:Category:Festivals in Georgia (U.S. state)
- First Battle of Dalton
- First ladies of Georgia (U.S. state)
- Flag of the state of Georgia
- Floyd County, Georgia
- Forsyth County, Georgia
- Forts in the state of Georgia
  - Category:Forts in Georgia (U.S. state)
    - commons:Category:Forts in Georgia (U.S. state)
- Franklin County, Georgia
- Fulton County, Georgia

== G ==
The obverse of the Great Seal of the State of Georgia

- GA – United States Postal Service postal code for the state of Georgia
- Geologic map of Georgia
- Geography of the state of Georgia
  - Category:Geography of Georgia (U.S. state)
    - commons:Category:Geography of Georgia (U.S. state)
- Geology of the state of Georgia
  - Category:Geology of Georgia (U.S. state)
    - commons:Category:Geology of Georgia (U.S. state)
- George Washington Carver State Park
- Georgia USA website
  - Category:Georgia (U.S. state)
    - commons:Category:Georgia (U.S. state)
      - commons:Category:Maps of Georgia (U.S. state)
- Georgia v. Smith
- Georgia Brass Band
- Georgia Budget & Policy Institute
- Georgia Career Information System
- Georgia–Carolina Memorial Bridge
- Georgia cracker
- Georgia Council for International Visitors
- Georgia District Church of the Nazarene
- Georgia during Reconstruction, 1865–1870
- Georgia Electronic Insurance Compliance System
- Georgia in the American Civil War, 1861–1865
- Georgia Legal Services Program
- Georgia Political Science Association
- Georgia State Capitol
- Georgia State Patrol
- Georgia Statewide Minority Business Enterprise Center
- Georgia Stimulus Plan
- Georgia (U.S. state) wiretapping laws
- Ghost towns in the state of Georgia
  - Category:Ghost towns in Georgia (U.S. state)
    - commons:Category:Ghost towns in Georgia (U.S. state)
- Gilmer County, Georgia
- Glascock County, Georgia
- Glynn County, Georgia
- Golf clubs and courses in the state of Georgia
- Gordon County, Georgia
- Government of the state of Georgia website
  - Category:Government of Georgia (U.S. state)
    - commons:Category:Government of Georgia (U.S. state)
- Governor of the State of Georgia
  - List of governors of the State of Georgia
- Grady County, Georgia
- Great Seal of the State of Georgia
- Greene County, Georgia
- Gwinnett County, Georgia

== H ==
- Habersham County, Georgia
- Hall County, Georgia
- Hancock County, Georgia
- Haralson County, Georgia
- Harris County, Georgia
- Hart County, Georgia
- Heard County, Georgia
- Heard's Fort, Georgia, state capital 1780-1781
- Henry County, Georgia
- Heritage railroads in the state of Georgia
  - commons:Category:Heritage railroads in Georgia (U.S. state)
- Higher education in the state of Georgia
- Hiking trails in the state of Georgia
  - commons:Category:Hiking trails in Georgia (U.S. state)
- History of the state of Georgia
  - Historical outline of the state of Georgia
    - Category:History of Georgia (U.S. state)
      - commons:Category:History of Georgia (U.S. state)
- Hospitals in the state of Georgia
- Hot springs of the state of Georgia
  - commons:Category:Hot springs of Georgia (U.S. state)
- House of Representatives of the State of Georgia
- Houston County, Georgia
- Holy Rollerz Christian Car Club
- Linda W. Hunter

== I ==
- Images of the state of Georgia
  - commons:Category:Georgia (U.S. state)
- Irwin County, Georgia
- Islands of the state of Georgia

== J ==
- Jackson County, Georgia
- Jasper County, Georgia
- Jeff Davis County, Georgia
- Jefferson County, Georgia
- Jenkins County, Georgia
- Johnson County, Georgia
- Jones County, Georgia

== L ==
- La Florida, (1565–1732)-1763
- Lakes of the state of Georgia
  - commons:Category:Lakes of Georgia (U.S. state)
- Lamar County, Georgia
- Landmarks in the state of Georgia
  - commons:Category:Landmarks in Georgia (U.S. state)
- Lanier County, Georgia
- Laurens County, Georgia
- Lee County, Georgia
- Liberty County, Georgia
- Lieutenant Governor of the State of Georgia
- Lincoln County, Georgia
- Lists related to the state of Georgia:
  - List of airports in the state of Georgia
  - List of census statistical areas in the state of Georgia
  - List of cities in the state of Georgia
  - List of colleges and universities in the state of Georgia
  - List of companies in the state of Georgia
  - List of United States congressional districts in the state of Georgia
  - List of counties in the state of Georgia
  - List of forts in the State of Georgia
  - List of ghost towns in the state of Georgia
  - List of governors of the state of Georgia
  - List of high schools in the state of Georgia
  - List of hospitals in the state of Georgia
  - List of individuals executed by the state of Georgia
  - List of islands of the state of Georgia
  - List of law enforcement agencies in the state of Georgia
  - List of lieutenant governors of the state of Georgia
  - List of museums in the state of Georgia
  - List of National Historic Landmarks in the state of Georgia
  - List of newspapers in the state of Georgia
  - List of people from the state of Georgia
  - List of places in the state of Georgia
  - List of radio stations in the state of Georgia
  - List of railroads in the state of Georgia
  - List of Registered Historic Places in Georgia
  - List of rivers in the state of Georgia
  - List of school districts in the state of Georgia
  - List of schools in the state of Georgia
  - List of snakes in the state of Georgia
  - List of state forests in Georgia
  - List of state highway routes in Georgia
  - List of state parks in Georgia
  - List of state prisons in Georgia
  - List of symbols of the state of Georgia
  - List of telephone area codes in the state of Georgia
  - List of television stations in the state of Georgia
  - Georgia's congressional delegations
  - List of United States congressional districts in Georgia
  - List of United States representatives from Georgia
  - List of United States senators from Georgia
- Long County, Georgia
- Louisville, Georgia, state capital 1796-1807
- Lowndes County, Georgia
- Lumpkin County, Georgia

== M ==
- Macon County, Georgia
- Macon, Georgia, state capital 1864-1865
- Madison County, Georgia
- Maps of the state of Georgia
  - commons:Category:Maps of Georgia (U.S. state)
- Marion County, Georgia
- McDuffie County, Georgia
- McIntosh County, Georgia
- Meriwether County, Georgia
- Milledgeville, Georgia, state capital 1807-1864 and 1865–1868
- Miller County, Georgia
- Mitchell County, Georgia
- Monroe County, Georgia
- Montgomery County, Georgia
- Monuments and memorials in the state of Georgia
  - commons:Category:Monuments and memorials in Georgia (U.S. state)
- Mountains of the state of Georgia
  - commons:Category:Mountains of Georgia (U.S. state)
- Morgan County, Georgia
- Murray County, Georgia
- Muscogee County, Georgia
- Museums in the state of Georgia
  - Category:Museums in Georgia (U.S. state)
    - commons:Category:Museums in Georgia (U.S. state)
- Music of the state of Georgia
  - commons:Category:Music of Georgia (U.S. state)
  - Category:Georgia (U.S. state) musical groups
  - Category:Musicians from Georgia (U.S. state)

== N ==
- National forests of the state of Georgia
  - commons:Category:National Forests of Georgia (U.S. state)
- Natural history of the state of Georgia
  - commons:Category:Natural history of Georgia (U.S. state)
- Nature centers in the state of Georgia
  - commons:Category:Nature centers in Georgia (U.S. state)
- News media in the state of Georgia
- Newspapers of the state of Georgia
- Newton County, Georgia

== O ==
- Oconee County, Georgia
- Oglethorpe County, Georgia
- Outdoor sculptures in the state of Georgia
  - commons:Category:Outdoor sculptures in Georgia (U.S. state)

== P ==
- Paulding County, Georgia
- Peach County, Georgia
- People from Georgia (U.S. state)
  - Category:People from Georgia (U.S. state)
    - commons:Category:People from Georgia (U.S. state)
    - Category:People from Georgia by populated place (U.S. state)
    - Category:People from Georgia (U.S. state) by occupation
- Pickens County, Georgia
- Pierce County, Georgia
- Pike County, Georgia
- Places in the state of Georgia
- Politics of Georgia (U.S. state)
  - Category:Politics of Georgia (U.S. state)
    - commons:Category:Politics of Georgia (U.S. state)
- Polk County, Georgia
- Protected areas of the state of Georgia
  - Category:Protected areas of Georgia (U.S. state)
    - commons:Category:Protected areas of Georgia (U.S. state)
- Province of Georgia, 1755–1776
- Pulaski County, Georgia
- Putnam County, Georgia

== Q ==
- Quitman County, Georgia

== R ==
- Rabun County, Georgia
- Radio stations in the state of Georgia
- Railroad museums in the state of Georgia
  - commons:Category:Railroad museums in Georgia (U.S. state)
- Railroads in the state of Georgia
- Randolph County, Georgia
- Registered historic places in the state of Georgia
  - commons:Category:Registered Historic Places in Georgia (U.S. state)
- Religion in the state of Georgia
  - Category:Religion in Georgia (U.S. state)
- Richmond County, Georgia
- Rivers of the state of Georgia
  - commons:Category:Rivers of Georgia (U.S. state)
- Rockdale County, Georgia

== S ==
- Savannah, Georgia, colonial capital 1733–1776, state capital 1776–1779, 1782 and 1784–1786
- Schley County, Georgia
- School districts in the state of Georgia
- Schools in the state of Georgia
- Scouting in the state of Georgia
- Screven County, Georgia
- Second Battle of Dalton
- Seminole County, Georgia
- Senate of the State of Georgia
- Settlements in the state of Georgia
  - Cities in the state of Georgia
  - Towns in the state of Georgia
  - Villages in the state of Georgia
  - Census Designated Places in the state of Georgia
  - Other unincorporated communities in the state of Georgia
  - List of ghost towns in the state of Georgia
  - List of places in the state of Georgia
- Skirmish at Pace's Ferry
- Spalding County, Georgia
- Sports in Georgia (U.S. state)
  - Category:Sports in Georgia (U.S. state)
    - commons:Category:Sports in Georgia (U.S. state)
  - Category:Sports venues in Georgia (U.S. state)
    - commons:Category:Sports venues in Georgia (U.S. state)
- State Capitol of Georgia
- State highway routes in Georgia
- State of Georgia website
  - Constitution of the State of Georgia
  - Government of the state of Georgia
    - Category:Government of Georgia (U.S. state)
      - commons:Category:Government of Georgia (U.S. state)
  - Executive branch of the government of the state of Georgia
    - Governor of the state of Georgia
  - Legislative branch of the government of the state of Georgia
    - Legislature of the state of Georgia
      - Senate of the State of Georgia
      - House of Representatives of the State of Georgia
  - Judicial branch of the government of the state of Georgia
    - Supreme Court of the State of Georgia
- State parks of Georgia
  - commons:Category:State parks of Georgia (U.S. state)
- State Patrol of Georgia
- State prisons of Georgia
- Stephens County, Georgia
- Stewart County, Georgia
- Storehouse Furniture
- Structures in Georgia (U.S. state)
  - commons:Category:Buildings and structures in Georgia (U.S. state)
- Sumter County, Georgia
- Supreme Court of the State of Georgia
- Symbols of the state of Georgia
  - Category:Symbols of Georgia (U.S. state)
    - commons:Category:Symbols of Georgia (U.S. state)

== T ==
- Talbot County, Georgia
- Taliaferro County, Georgia
- Tattnall County, Georgia
- Taylor County, Georgia
- Telecommunications in the State of Georgia
  - commons:Category:Communications in Georgia (U.S. state)
- Telephone area codes in the State of Georgia
- Television shows set in the State of Georgia
- Television stations in the State of Georgia
- Telfair County, Georgia
- Tennessee Valley Authority
- Terrell County, Georgia
- Theatres in the State of Georgia
  - commons:Category:Theatres in Georgia (U.S. state)
- Thomas County, Georgia
- Tift County, Georgia
- Toombs County, Georgia
- Tourism in the State of Georgia website
  - commons:Category:Tourism in Georgia (U.S. state)
- Towns County, Georgia
- Trail of Tears, 1830–1838
- Transportation in the State of Georgia
  - Category:Transportation in Georgia (U.S. state)
    - commons:Category:Transport in Georgia (U.S. state)
- Treutlen County, Georgia
- Troup County, Georgia
- Turner County, Georgia
- Twiggs County, Georgia

== U ==
- Union County, Georgia
- United States of America
  - States of the United States of America
  - United States census statistical areas of Georgia
  - Georgia's congressional delegations
  - United States congressional districts in Georgia
  - United States Court of Appeals for the Eleventh Circuit
  - United States District Court for the Middle District of Georgia
  - United States District Court for the Northern District of Georgia
  - United States District Court for the Southern District of Georgia
  - United States representatives from Georgia
  - United States senators from Georgia
- Universities and colleges in the State of Georgia
  - commons:Category:Universities and colleges in Georgia (U.S. state)
- Upson County, Georgia
- US-GA – ISO 3166-2:US region code for the State of Georgia

== V ==
- Valdosta, Georgia

== W ==
- Walker County, Georgia
- Walton County, Georgia
- Ware County, Georgia
- Warm Springs, Georgia
- Warren County, Georgia
- Washington County, Georgia
- Water parks in the state of Georgia
- Waterfalls of the state of Georgia
  - commons:Category:Waterfalls of Georgia (U.S. state)
    - Waterfalls of North Georgia
  Wikimedia
  - Wikimedia Commons:Category:Georgia (U.S. state)
    - commons:Category:Maps of Georgia (U.S. state)
  - Wikinews:Category:Georgia (U.S. state)
    - Wikinews:Portal:Georgia (U.S. state)
  - Wikipedia Category:Georgia (U.S. state)
    - Wikipedia Portal:Georgia (U.S. state)
    - Wikipedia:WikiProject Georgia (U.S. state)
      - Category:WikiProject Georgia (U.S. state) articles
      - Wikipedia:WikiProject Georgia (U.S. state)#Members
- Wayne County, Georgia
- Webster County, Georgia
- Wheeler County, Georgia
- White County, Georgia
- Whitfield County, Georgia
- Wilcox County, Georgia
- Wilkes County, Georgia
- Wilkinson County, Georgia
- Worth County, Georgia

== Z ==
- Zoos in the state of Georgia
  - commons:Category:Zoos in Georgia (U.S. state)

== See also ==
- Topic overview:
  - Georgia (U.S. state)
  - Outline of Georgia (U.S. state)
