= Annapolis Transit =

Primary provider of bus transit for Annapolis, Maryland

- Parent: Annapolis Department of Transportation
- Headquarters: 160 Duke of Gloucester Street
- Locale: Annapolis, Maryland
- Service area: Annapolis & vicinity
- Service type: bus service
- Routes: 12
- Hubs: Annapolis Market Place; Church Circle; Eastport Plaza; Westfield Mall
- Fleet: 20+
- Fuel type: Diesel
- Website: http://www.ci.annapolis.md.us

Annapolis Transit is a public transportation service of the Annapolis, Maryland Department of Transportation. It provides seven fixed-routes and one free-fare circulator service to provide access between downtown Annapolis and its suburbs. The Maryland Transit Administration complements these routes, providing access to Baltimore via "local bus service" (Route 70 or Washington, D.C.) or Eastern Shore via "commuter bus lines" (Routes 922 & 950).

== System ==
The Annapolis Transit system consists of eight color-coded routes that serve Annapolis and the surrounding area.

Route	Termini	Areas Served	Transfers
Green	Westfield Mall; Eastport (via West Street)	Annapolis Mall; Annapolis Towne Centre; Public Library; Westgate Circle; Church Circle; City Dock; Eastport Plaza	MTA Maryland 70, 210, 215
Orange	Downtown Annapolis to Forest Drive (via Spa Road)	Annapolis Market Place; Clock Tower Place; Truxton Park; Eastport Plaza; Bay Ridge Shopping Center; Spa Creek Conservancy; Westgate Circle; Church Circle	MTA Maryland 70, 210, 215
Yellow	Westfield Mall; Riva Road	Annapolis Mall; Anne Arundel Medical Center; Gateway Village; Waterworks Park; Harry S. Truman Park & Ride; Festival at Riva; Annapolis High School	MTA Maryland 210, 215
Red	Westfield Mall; Eastport (via Admiral Drive/Hilltop Lane)	Annapolis Mall; Anne Arundel Medical Center; Annapolis Market Place; Maryland Automobile Insurance Fund; Clock Tower Place; Truxton Park; Easport Plaza	MTA Maryland 210, 215
Brown	Westfield Mall; Eastport (via Forest Drive)	Annapolis Mall; Annapolis Market Place; Annapolis Towne Centre; Clock Tower Place; Eastport Plaza; Bay Ridge Shopping Center; Quiet Waters Park	MTA Maryland 210, 215
Gold	Edgewater; Arnold/AACC (via Bestgate Road/MD 2)	Annapolis Mall; Anne Arundel Medical Center; Navy–Marine Corps Memorial Stadium; St. John's College; Anne Arundel Community College; Arnold	MTA Maryland 70, 210, 215
Purple North	Westfield Mall; Eastport (via West Street)	Annapolis Mall; Anne Arundel Medical Center; Annapolis Towne Centre; Public Library; Westgate Circle; Church Circle; City Dock; Eastport Plaza	MTA Maryland 70, 210, 215
Purple South	Westfield Mall; Eastport (via Hilltop Lane)	Annapolis Mall; Annapolis Market Place; Annapolis Towne Centre; Maryland Automobile Insurance Fund; Clock Tower Place; Truxton Park; Eastport Plaza; Bay Ridge Shopping Center; Quiet Waters Park	MTA Maryland 70, 210, 215
