= GCIS =

GCIS may refer to:

- Georgia Career Information System
- Global Change Information System
- Government Communication and Information System
- Global City International School, Bangalore

== See also ==
- GCI (disambiguation)
