= GCI =

GCI may refer to:

== Education ==
- Galt Collegiate Institute, in Cambridge, Ontario, Canada
- Glebe Collegiate Institute, in Ottawa, Ontario, Canada
- Global Change Institute, at the University of the Witwatersrand, Johannesburg, South Africa
- Global Cinematography Institute, in Los Angeles, California, United States
- Government College Ikorodu, in Lagos State, Nigeria

== Environmentalism ==
- Glen Canyon Institute, in Utah, United States
- Green Cross International, an International environmental organization
- Green Campus Initiative (UCT), a student organization at the University of Cape Town

== Science, medicine and technology ==
- GCI (company), an American telecommunications company
- Gaussian correlation inequality
- Generalized conversational implicature
- Geomagnetically induced current
- Glial cytoplasmic inclusions, a type of abnormal protein deposit in the brain
- Google Code-in, an annual programming contest
- Ground-controlled interception
- Grating-coupled interferometry, a biophysical characterization method
- Global Caller Identification, a parameter used in telecoms protocols

== Transportation ==
- Guernsey Airport, in the Channel Islands
- GCI coach, the staple of Belgian passenger rail traffic in the steam era

== Other uses ==
- International Conference on the Situation in Venezuela (Spanish: Grupo de Contacto Internacional)
- First Geneva Convention
- Gannett Company, an American newspaper publisher
- Getty Conservation Institute, an American art conservation organization
- Glass Ceiling Index, an index for visualizing economic inequality
- Global Competitiveness Index
- Grace Communion International, a Christian denomination
- Grassroots Campaigns, Inc., an American political consulting organization
- Great Coasters International, an American roller coaster builder
- Great Commission International, an American religious organization
