= Church of the Nazarene (disambiguation) =

Church of the Nazarene may refer to:

- Church of the Nazarene, an international Christian denomination with a Wesleyan-holiness theology.
- Georgia District Church of the Nazarene, the Georgia District of the Southeast USA Region of the Church of the Nazarene.
- Church of the Nazarene (Casa Grande, Arizona), listed on the NRHP in Pinal County, Arizona
- Church of the Nazarene (Essex, New York), listed on the NRHP in New York
