= MAIF =

MAIF may refer to:

- Maryland Automobile Insurance Fund, American insurance company
- Mjällby AIF, Swedish football club
