= Climate change in Georgia =

Climate change in Georgia may refer to:

- Environmental issues in Georgia (country)#Climate change, for the Caucasus country
- Climate change in Georgia (U.S. state), for the U.S. state
