= Holy Roller (disambiguation) =

"Holy Roller" is a term used to describe Christian denominations in the Wesleyan-Holiness movement.

Holy Roller or Holy Rollers may also refer to:

== Film ==
- Holy Rollers (film), a 2010 American film starring Jesse Eisenberg
- Holy Rollers, a fictional roller derby team in the 2009 film Whip It

== Music ==
- Holy Rollers (band), an American punk band
- Holy Roller (album), a 1999 album by Reverend Horton Heat
- "Holy Roller", a song by Mother Love Bone from Apple
- "Holy Roller", a song by Nazareth from Greatest Hits
- "Holy Roller", a song by Thao & the Get Down Stay Down from We the Common
- "Holy Roller", a song by Throwdown from Venom & Tears
- "Holy Roller", a song by Spiritbox from Eternal Blue
- "Holy Roller", a song by Zach Bryan from Zach Bryan
- "Holy Roller", a song by The Format
- "Holy Roller (Hallelujah)", a song by Portugal. The Man from Evil Friends

== Sports ==
- Holy Roller (American football), a play in a 1978 game between the San Diego Chargers and the Oakland Raiders
- Holy Roller (horse) (foaled 1992), an Australian Thoroughbred racehorse

== Other ==
- Holy Roller (tank), one of two Canadian tanks that fought from D-Day to VE Day
- Holy Rollers N.Y.B., a club in the annual New Year's Day Mummers Parade in Philadelphia, Pennsylvania
- Holy Rollerz, an American Christian automotive ministry
- The Holy Roller, a 2023 superhero comic series created by Andy Samberg, Rick Remender, and Joe Trohman, published by Image Comics.
