= Climate of Georgia =

Climate of Georgia may refer to:

- Climate of Georgia (U.S. state)
- Climate of Georgia (country)
