= Law of Georgia (U.S. state) =

The law of the U.S. state of Georgia consists of several levels, including constitutional, statutory, and regulatory law, as well as case law and local law. The Official Code of Georgia Annotated forms the general statutory law.

== Sources ==
The Constitution of Georgia is the foremost source of state law. Legislation is enacted by the Georgia General Assembly, published in the Georgia Laws, and codified in the Official Code of Georgia Annotated (O.C.G.A.). State agencies promulgate regulations (sometimes called administrative law) which are codified in the Rules and Regulations of Georgia. Georgia's legal system is based on common law, which is interpreted by case law through the decisions of the Supreme Court and the Court of Appeals, which are published in the Georgia Reports and Georgia Appeals Reports, respectively. Counties and municipalities may also promulgate local ordinances, which are often codified. In addition, there are also several sources of persuasive authority, which are not binding authority but are useful to lawyers and judges insofar as they help to clarify the current state of the law.

=== Constitution ===
The Constitution of Georgia is the foundation of the government of Georgia and vests the legislative power of the state in the Georgia General Assembly. The Georgia Constitution is subordinate only to the Constitution of the United States, which is the supreme law of the land.

=== Legislation ===
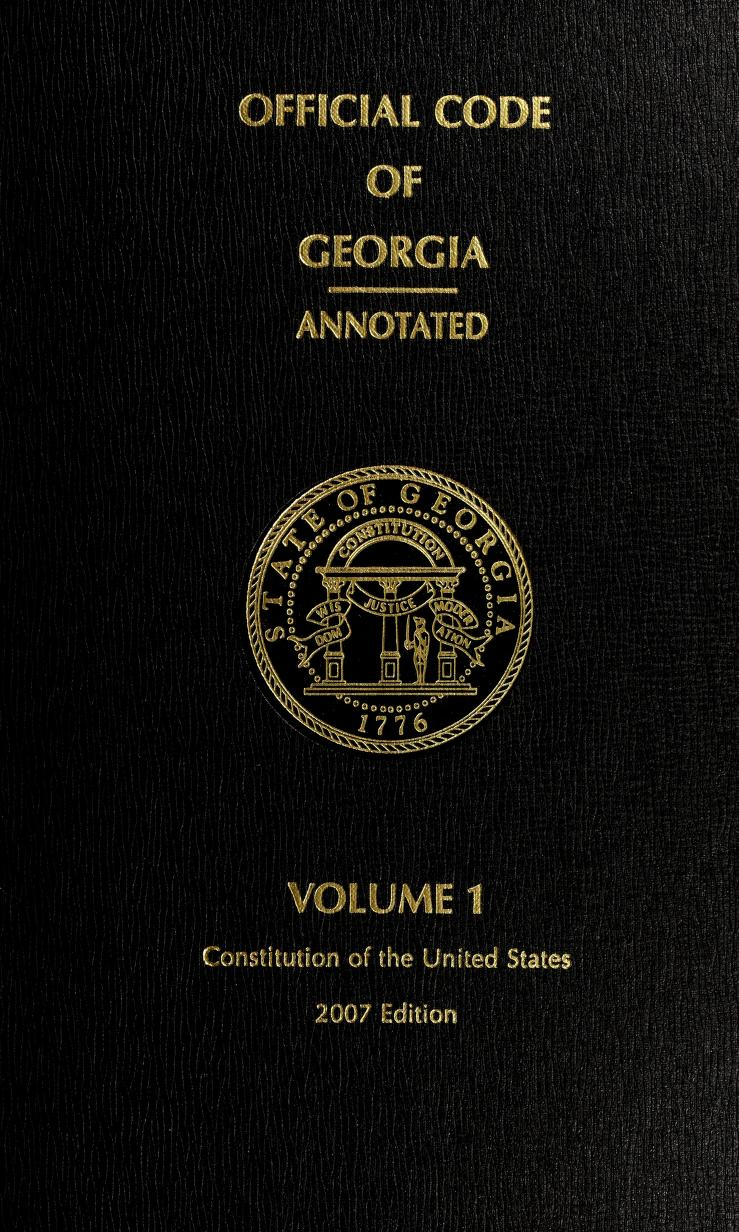
Cover of volume 1 of the 2007 edition of the Official Code of Georgia Annotated

Pursuant to the state constitution, the Georgia General Assembly has enacted legislation. Its session laws are published in the official Georgia Laws, which in turn have been codified in the Official Code of Georgia Annotated (O.C.G.A.). The Code of Georgia Annotated is another, unofficial codification published by West.

The Georgia Code Revision Commission oversees the publication of the O.C.G.A., which is published by LexisNexis. The O.C.G.A. was first adopted in 1981 and became effective in November 1982; previously, Harrison's Georgia Code Annotated (a.k.a. the Code of 1933) was the only published code.

The Georgia Laws are compiled and annually published by the Georgia Office of Legislative Counsel, who also serves as the staff of the Code Revision Commission, and are distributed by the Georgia Secretary of State. The Georgia Laws have been published since 1820. The Session Laws of American States and Territories Georgia contains session laws from 1787–1899.

=== Regulations ===
Pursuant to certain statutes, state agencies have promulgated bodies of regulations (sometimes called administrative law). The regulations are codified in the Rules and Regulations of Georgia (formally the Official Compilation, Rules and Regulations of the State of Georgia). Weil's Georgia Government Register (the Register) from LexisNexis and the Georgia Regulation Tracking database from Westlaw provide information on rulemaking activity.

=== Case law ===
The legal system of Georgia is based on the common law. Like all U.S. states except Louisiana, Georgia has a reception statute providing for the "reception" of English law. All statutes, regulations, and ordinances are subject to judicial review. Pursuant to common law tradition, the courts of Georgia have developed a large body of case law through the decisions of the Supreme Court of Georgia and the Georgia Court of Appeals.

The official reporter for the Supreme Court and the Court of Appeals are the Georgia Reports and Georgia Appeals Reports, respectively. Georgia Cases (a Georgia-specific version of the South Eastern Reporter) is another, unofficial reporter. There is no official reporting of decisions of trial courts, but West's Jury Verdicts Georgia Reports publishes significant trial court decisions, and the Georgia Trial Reporter publishes a monthly summary of all available superior and state court civil jury trials in the Atlanta metropolitan area that result in a verdict.

=== Local ordinances ===
The Georgia Constitution grants cities and counties a significant amount of home rule authority. As such, cities and counties enact local ordinances for their governance, and most highly populated cities and counties have published codifications of their ordinances.

=== Other ===
Georgia Jurisprudence is a major legal encyclopedia.

== See also ==
=== Topics ===
- Georgia (U.S. state) wiretapping laws
- Gun laws in Georgia
- LGBT rights in Georgia (U.S. state)

=== Other ===
- Crime in Georgia
- Law enforcement in Georgia (U.S. state)
- Law of the United States
- List of legislative committees of Georgia (U.S. state)
- Politics of Georgia (U.S. state)
