= Annapolis Mall =

Shopping mall in Anne Arundel County, Maryland, U.S.

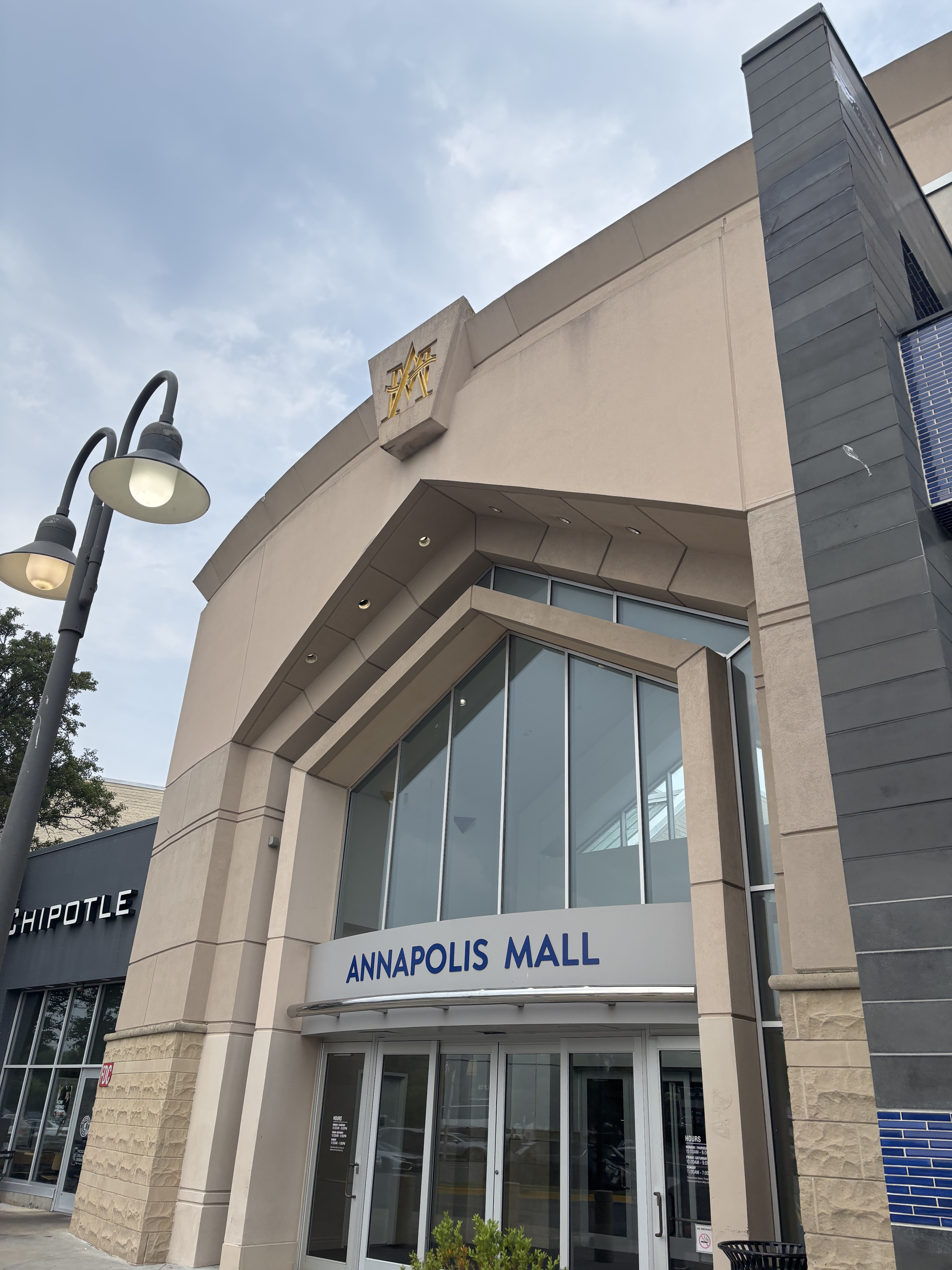
- One of the mall’s entrances near Chipotle and the food court
- Location: Annapolis, Maryland, United States
- Coordinates: 38.989736°N 76.545138°W
- Address: 2002 Annapolis Mall; Annapolis, MD 21401
- Opened: August 14, 1980; 46 years ago
- Previous names: Westfield Shoppingtown Annapolis (1998–2005); Westfield Annapolis (2005–2024)
- Developer: May Centers, Inc.
- Manager: Macerich
- Owner: Macerich
- Num. of stores: 240+
- Num. of anchor tenants: 6
- Floor area: 1,416,774 sq ft (131,622.6 m^{2}).
- Floors: 1
- Parking: 4,376 spots, including three 3-floor parking garages and rooftop parking
- Public transit: Anne Arundel County Transit bus: 203, 205, 207, 208; Annapolis Transit bus: Red, Brown, Green
- Website: www.shopannapolismall.com

Annapolis Mall (formerly Westfield Annapolis) is an enclosed shopping mall in Parole, just east of the intersection of Interstate 97 and U.S. Route 50 and in close proximity to the mall's namesake of Annapolis, Maryland. Owned and managed by Macerich, the mall features 1,416,744 sq ft (131,622.6 m^{2}) of GLA, making it the second-largest shopping mall in Maryland after Arundel Mills.

== History ==
The site was at one time the location of the Annapolis terminus of the Washington, Baltimore and Annapolis Electric Railway, and was known as the "Best Gate" station, which had three single-ended and four double-ended sidings, where rail cars could be shunted on or off of the single-track WB&A east–west railway which ran to the north–south Baltimore and Ohio Railroad and Pennsylvania Railroad lines. This "Best Gate" station gave the name to the nearby Bestgate Road, which today runs along the northern perimeter of the mall.

The first plans for a shopping mall on the site were submitted in 1968, with a free-standing, single-level Montgomery Ward store opening in the mean time in 1971. Construction for the shopping mall began on September 24, 1978, and was completed in 1980 for an opening celebration held on August 14 of that year. Other than Montgomery Ward, which was incorporated into the mall on opening, additional anchor stores included Washington, D.C.–based Garfinckel's and Hecht's, both with two levels. The mall was developed by May Centers, a division of The May Department Stores Company, which also owned the Hecht's department store chain. On opening, the mall featured around 600,000 square feet (56,000 m^{2}) of GLA. The mall was expanded in 1983 with the addition of a single-level JCPenney. Garfinckel's closed in 1990 after the company filed for Chapter 11 bankruptcy.

Soon after May Centers, then known as CenterMark, was acquired by a consortium including Westfield Group in 1993, Annapolis Mall was expanded again in 1994 with the addition of a two-level Nordstrom store as well as an expanded food court. Westfield Group acquired the remaining shares in CenterMark, and thus Annapolis Mall, in 1996. The mall continued its expansion plans, adding a two-level Lord & Taylor store in 1998, which was followed by the opening of an 11-screen movie theater. During this time, the mall was renamed to Westfield Shoppingtown Annapolis. The Montgomery Ward store closed in 2001 and in 2002 was replaced with a Sears store. Hecht's was rebranded as Macy's in September 2006 after The May Department Stores Company, the mall's original owners, were ultimately acquired and folded into Federated Department Stores, now known as Macy's, Inc.

In 2007, the mall completed a $150 million expansion. The expansion added an additional 240,000 square feet (22,000 m^{2}) of retail space featuring 60 new stores such as Pottery Barn and H&M.

The former Garfinckel's space once housed a two-level Borders Books and Music store which operated during the mid-2000s until its closure in 2011. A Forever 21 location opened in the space in 2013. On February 22, 2025, Forever 21 announced that they would be closing their location at the mall as part of their Chapter 11 bankruptcy proceedings. The store closed on April 29.

In August 2017, Lord & Taylor announced that they would close their store at Westfield Annapolis. In December of that same year, the mall's owner Westfield Group was acquired by French firm Unibail-Rodamco, becoming Unibail-Rodamco-Westfield (URW). In January 2020, URW announced that the ground level of the former Lord & Taylor space would be reconstructed into a “retail district” featuring stores such as The Container Store.

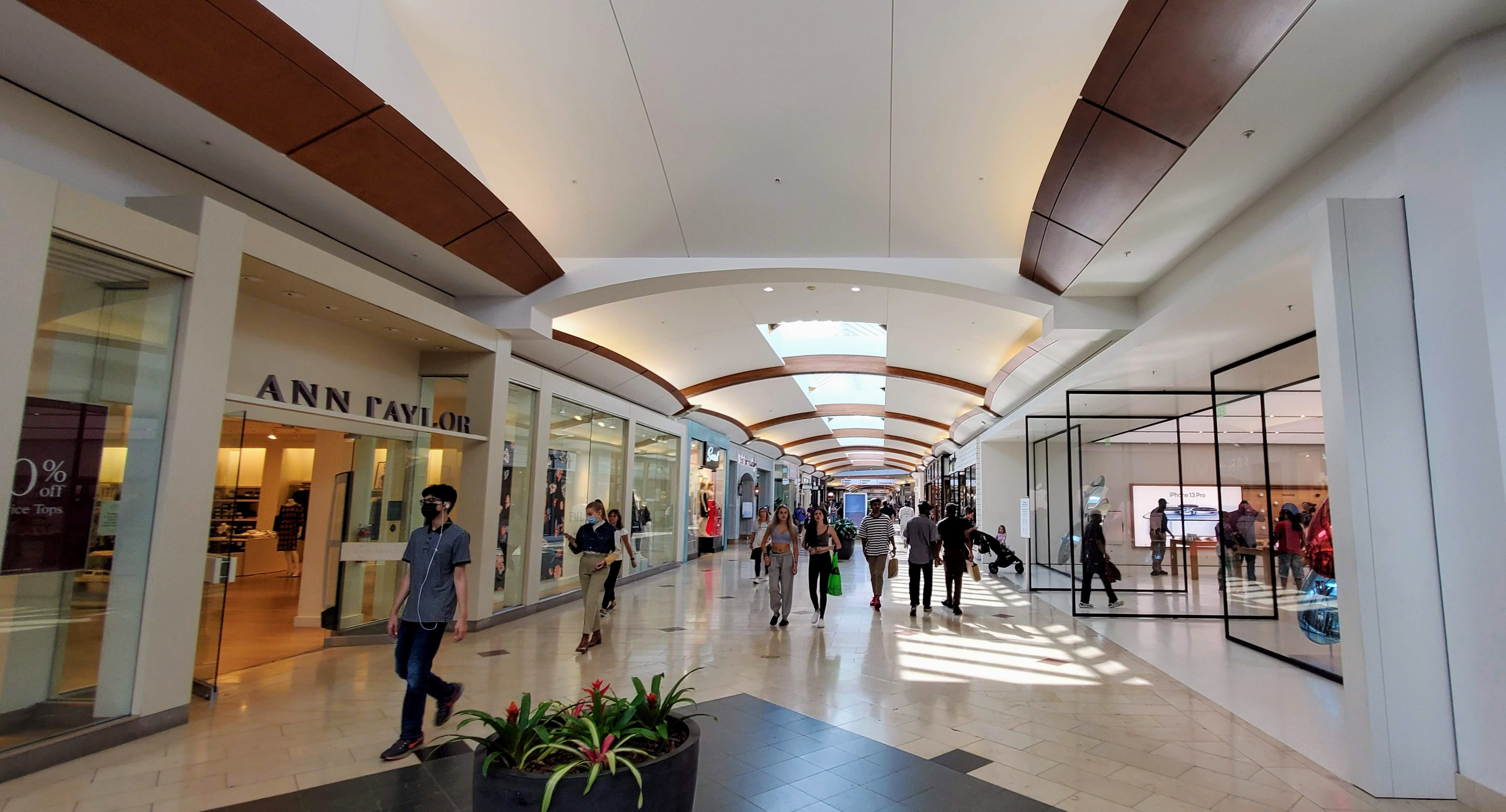
Inside of the mall

In April 2018, Anne Arundel County Public Library opened a temporary branch called "Discoveries: the Library at the Mall", in Westfield Annapolis. It moved to a permanent location in the former American Eagle and Charlotte Russe stores in February 2020. Since July 2021, the library includes a Community Pantry where staff distribute diapers, baby supplies, hygiene items and menstrual supplies twice a month. In August 2025, the library expanded further, adding 3,200 square feet (300 m^{2}) and creating a large event space for the library.

In May 2020, Nordstrom announced it would shutter their Annapolis location during a wave of secondary store closures. The store closed on July 15 of that same year.

The SPCA of Anne Arundel County opened an animal shelter called "Paws at the Mall" at the mall in September 2020. It was the first animal shelter of its kind to operate inside of an indoor shopping mall.

In April 2022, AMC Theatres announced the acquisition of seven Bow Tie Cinemas locations, including their location at Westfield Annapolis. The theater reopened as AMC Annapolis Mall 11 on the weekend of April 21, 2022.

On May 10, 2024, a listing by local retail broker H&R Retail revealed that JCPenney was slated to close in 2025 and be replaced by five tenants, including Hobby Lobby, Grocery Outlet and Onelife Fitness. In February 2025, JCPenney announced that they would be closing its store as part of a plan to close eight stores nationwide. The store was originally scheduled to close by May 25. However, on April 16, it was announced that JCPenney had extended their lease at Annapolis Mall through August 31. The store's liquidation sales were halted the same day. Following the lease extension, a representative from the department store stated "We are optimistic that we can come to an agreement that will suit all parties involved, and that JCPenney can continue to serve our loyal customers in the Annapolis area for years to come". However, no lease agreement was reached and the store closed on August 17, 2025. This left Macy's as the last traditional department store.

On May 16, 2024, it was confirmed that URW was in negotiations to sell the mall. This came after a prior announcement in 2022 that the company was seeking to sell their American malls, later amended to only selling non-flagship properties. On August 5, 2024, it was reported that Centennial Real Estate Management acquired the property for an undisclosed sum. Following the sale, all Westfield branding was removed and the mall was renamed to Annapolis Mall.

On September 3, 2024, Centennial formally announced their acquisition of the mall as part of a consortium that also includes former WeWork and GGP CEO Sandeep Mathrani, Waterfall Asset Management and Lincoln Property Company. Through Mathrani's company Atlas Hill Real Estate, both Centennial and Mathrani will serve as owners of the property. The announcement also came with news that two new anchors would be joining the mall, both initially slated to open in the winter of 2025 before being delayed: Dick's House of Sport and Dave & Buster's.

On December 30, 2024, Sandeep Mathrani announced that the former Sears site was to be replaced by “half retail and half rental apartments.” He also announced negotiations to fill 200,000 sq ft (19,000 m^{2}) of vacant space throughout the mall. These negotiations include two tenants to fill about 80,000 sq ft (7,400 m^{2}) in the mall’s 2007 expansion corridor. On February 9, 2025, Centennial CEO Paul Kurzawa announced that another new anchor for the mall was "in the works," although he declined to reveal the name of the anchor or where in the mall it would be located. New stores announced in 2025 and slated to open in 2026 include a Tesla dealership and service center, Uniqlo and Jack and Jones.

On October 30, 2025, New Village Academy announced that they had secured funding to construct a 52,575-square-foot (4,884.4 m^{2}) charter school in the second floor unit previously home to Lord & Taylor. A groundbreaking ceremony was held on November 19 of the same year, with plans to welcome their first class of students in fall 2026.

On May 6, 2026, Macerich announced their acquisition of the mall and the adjacent parcel formerly occupied by Sears for $272 million. Macerich also announced an additional $40 million in leasing capital as part of a strategic investment plan. Dick’s House of Sport opened on August 5, 2026.

=== 2006 shooting ===
On Saturday, November 18, 2006, an off-duty United States Secret Service agent was at the mall when he witnessed a fight in progress in the food court. During the attempt to break up the fight, one of the combatants pulled a gun and fired at the agent, wounding him. The agent returned fire, hitting the shooter twice. A third person was wounded in the altercation. A midshipman from the U.S. Naval Academy ran toward the sound of gunshots and provided first aid for the Secret Service agent. That midshipman later received the Navy and Marine Corps Achievement Medal. The mall was closed shortly after the incident, with all patrons asked to leave over the public address system. The associated trial ended in December 2007 and the shooter was sentenced to 65 years in prison.
