= Georgia Stimulus Plan =

The Georgia Stimulus Plan is part of the national stimulus plan, also known as American Recovery and Reinvestment Act of 2009. On February 25, 2009 $339 million, part of the $6 billions that Georgia potentially will receive, was put into the state's account but Governor Sonny Perdue has not yet accepted it. Given over the course of three years $2.27 billion of the money would go toward Georgia Education. Part of the stimulus plan is a state fiscal-stabilization fund, which would go toward three main categories: restoring previous education cuts, prevent teacher layoffs, and modernize and repair public schools.

The money would also aid Title I schools, special education, child care services, technology, grants for encouraging schools to close the achievement gap and for more efficient data systems. The plan would allow for Georgia schools to spend $497 per students – Georgia ranking number 28 in the nation, according to New America Foundation, a nonpartisan research group. Kathy Cox, Georgia schools superintendent, will be in charge of giving out half of the stimulus money, while the governor will be responsible for the rest. Cox is hoping for the acceptance of this money so that Georgia schools can avoid layoffs Perdue is hesitant to pass the bill saying that he does not want to raise taxes to keep unemployment programs but he also wants Georgians "to get everything to which they're entitled" . The plan is important to Georgia because many in many rural areas, the school districts are the biggest employers. For other districts, schools use the Special Purpose Local Option Sales Tax (SPLOST) to pay for things, like construction. SPLOST gets the money from sales tax, so because revenues sales have been down, so has SPLOST. If Georgia gets the money, they would be able to spend some on renovating schools which in turn would create more construction jobs.

Without the stimulus plan, educational subcommittees are predicting $280 state cuts – a two percent reduction. Recently Georgia has cut $95 per student. .

The subcommittee is recommending Georgia to at least accept $145 million of the federal stimulus money
