= Church of the Nazarene (building, Casa Grande) =

Historic church in Arizona, United States

- U.S. National Register of Historic Places
- Location within Arizona Location within the United States
- Location: 305 E. Fourth St., Casa Grande, Arizona
- Coordinates: 32°52′39″N 111°45′0″W
- Built: 1949
- Architectural style: Mission / Spanish Revival, Romanesque
- MPS: Casa Grande, Arizona MPS
- NRHP reference No.: 02000750
- Added to NRHP: November 20, 2002

The Church of the Nazarene is a historic church located at 305 East 4th Street in Casa Grande, Arizona, in the United States. Built in 1949, it was added to the National Register of Historic Places, on November 20, 2002, as the Church of the Nazarene. It was listed for its architecture. The church shows Spanish revival and Romanesque architectural styles.

It was included in the Casa Grande, Arizona Multiple Property Submission study.

== See also ==
- List of historic properties in Casa Grande, Arizona
