= Grassroots Campaigns, Inc. =

American consulting and fundraising corporation

Grassroots Campaigns
- Formation: 2003
- Type: For-profit company
- Headquarters: Boston, Massachusetts, U.S.
- Location(s): Albuquerque, NM Amherst, MA Austin, TX Berkeley, CA Boston, MA Brooklyn, NY Chicago, IL Denver, CO Kansas City, MO Los Angeles, CA New Orleans, LA New York City, NY Newport Beach, CA Minneapolis, MN Pasadena, CA Philadelphia, PA Portland, OR Raleigh, NC Sacramento, CA Santa Cruz, CA San Diego, CA Seattle, WA Washington, D.C.
- Founder: Douglas Phelps
- Website: grassrootscampaigns.com

Grassroots Campaigns, Inc. is a for-profit corporation that does strategic consulting, and fund raising for humanitarian and progressive causes and political organizations. Grassroots Campaigns employs thousands of workers to generate small-donor contributions, increase visibility, and expand the membership base for a number of progressive groups, issues, and campaigns. Headquartered in Boston, Massachusetts, the company was founded in December 2003 by a small team of experienced organizers who specialized in grassroots-level political and public interest organizing with groups like the Public Interest Research Group However, since its founding, it has consistently faced accusations of anti-union activity at odds with its stated progressive roots.

== History ==
Grassroots Campaigns was founded in December 2003 with the goal of providing high-quality data-driven field campaigns and small donor fundraising campaigns to progressive organizations and candidates. The company expanded very rapidly. By April 2004 Grassroots Campaigns had opened offices in 40 cities throughout the country. By July 2004 they had over 2,000 staff knocking on doors and fund raising on behalf of the Democratic National Committee. During that same year Grassroots work with MoveOn PAC to help staff and manage their "Leave No Voter Behind," campaign. This was a "get out the vote" (GOTV) program intended to give Democratic candidate John Kerry an edge in the swing states. By October 2004, they had more than 50,000 people canvassing their neighborhoods in 17 of the most contested swing states of the 2004 Presidential Election. Following the 2004 election, Grassroots kept some of their field offices open in order to run door-to-door and site-based canvassing programs to raise money from small donors and help build and expand supporter lists on behalf of the American Civil Liberties Union and other groups.

In 2006, Grassroots Campaigns again partnered with MoveOn.org to run Call for Change, one of the largest volunteer phonebanking efforts in American history. Over 120 organizers in 40 cities nationwide recruited and trained over 100,000 volunteers who made more than 7 million phone calls to voters in the closest races of the midterm election. Following this election cycle, Grassroots continued to expand its year-round field programs, including maintaining base-building and small-donor fundraising operations in more than a dozen cities across the country.

During the 2008 election cycle, Grassroots Campaigns expanded and partnered with a number of organizations working to elect Barack Obama and other Democrats. More than 200 organizers and canvass directors across the country ran programs that registered over 250,000 voters in key battleground states. As the election approached Grassroots Campaigns took part in get-out-the-vote efforts in key states. Grassroots worked with the League of Conservation Voters among other groups to contact voters in key states and districts and encourage voters to make it out to the polls.

During the 2010 midterm elections, Grassroots Campaigns was active in Pennsylvania, Colorado, Missouri and Washington state.

Grassroots Campaigns ran nationwide voter mobilization effort in 2012 to re-elect President Obama and help other Democratic candidates get into office. Most work was done in Colorado and Nevada, with additional projects in Montana and a few other states.

In 2014 Grassroots Campaigns did extensive work in Colorado, Iowa, Nevada and Pennsylvania. Grassroots ran the largest canvass in the state for the Iowa Senate race, knocking on more than 150,000 doors statewide.

Following the election, Grassroots is launching permanent offices in Des Moines and Phoenix. While it continues to open offices throughout the country, it is also hampered as they also tend to close offices that engage in union activity.

== Current work ==
Grassroots Campaigns is currently running national campaigns for progressive political and charitable organizations like the American Civil Liberties Union, Oxfam America, The Nature Conservancy and The Southern Poverty Law Center.

Grassroots Campaigns entered the fall of 2012 running offices in 18 cities. Grassroots Campaigns currently employs over 100 Lead Directors, Assistant Directors, and Field Staff who manage staff and run these offices and an estimated 750 paid canvassers nationwide.

== Past and current clients ==
- Democratic National Committee
- MoveOn.org Political Action
- American Civil Liberties Union (ACLU)
- League of Conservation Voters
- California League of Conservation Voters
- Sierra Club
- The Nature Conservancy
- Democratic Congressional Campaign Committee
- Planned Parenthood Federation of America
- Planned Parenthood Action Fund
- Center for American Progress
- Working America
- People For the American Way
- Common Cause
- ACORN
- Amnesty International USA
- The Media Fund
- Save the Children
- Equality California
- Equality Maine
- VoteVets.org
- Southern Poverty Law Center
- Doctors Without Borders
- Lambda Legal
- National LGBTQ Task Force

== Controversies ==
In 2006 and 2007 Grassroots Campaigns settled two wage disputes out of court, one in California and one in Oregon. The California claim alleged that workers were being asked to work more hours than allowed by California law during the days leading up to the 2006 election. The Oregon claim alleged that Grassroots improperly paid some students a minimum wage less than the local allowed minimum wage for a portion of their hours worked. Grassroots Campaigns claimed the students were paid properly and legally, and the matter was settled by both parties.

Grassroots Campaigns has also had numerous charges of anti-union activity, with unfair labor practices filed with the National Labor Relations Board in Portland, Philadelphia, Seattle, Chicago, Ann Arbor. The cases include unfair retaliation, discipline, layoffs, surveillance of employees, coercion, intimidation, and illegal closure of offices in response to union activity in Portland and Seattle.

== See also ==
- Canvassing
- Fundraising
- Street harassment
- U.S. presidential election, 2004
- Political campaigns
- Activism
- Politics
