= Maryland Automobile Insurance Fund =

American insurance company

- Formerly: The Unsatisfied Claim and Judgment Fund Board
- Industry: Automobile insurance
- Founded: 1972
- Headquarters: Maryland, USA
- Key people: Robert McKinney (Chairman)

The Maryland Automobile Insurance Fund (MAIF) was created in 1972 by the Maryland General Assembly as a residual market mechanism with the goal of providing automobile insurance to individuals who may not have qualified for automobile insurance in the private market.

== History ==
In 1957, it was formerly known as the Unsatisfied Claim and Judgment Fund Board. The name was changed to Maryland Automobile Insurance Fund (MAIF), on January 1, 1973.

In 2006, MAIF was the sixth largest writer of private passenger automobile insurance in the state of Maryland.

== Board of trustees ==
Maryland Auto is governed by a board of trustees composed of nine members selected by the Governor for a five-year period, with the advice and approval of the Senate. The Executive Director manages Maryland Auto's day-to-day affairs and works at the Board of Trustees' convenience.

== Notable people ==
- Robert L. McKinney - Chairman
- Mark D. McCurdy - Executive Director
- Cathy E. Nyce - Director (Communications & Corporate Relations Committee)
- Paul Deter - Director (Fiscal Department)
- Carlton F. Milligan - Director (Information Technology Department)
- Lois W. Oechsle - General Counsel
- Delaine McMath - Senior Manager (Internal Auditing)
- Sandra L. Dodson - Senior Manager (Government Relations)
- Joseph M. Kalinowski - Senior Manager (Imaging, Supply Room, & Building Services)
- Elizabeth A. Gruendi - Senior Manager (Casualty Unit)
- Kevin J. Wood - Senior Manager (Finance & Accounting/Collections)
- Leda A. Favor - Senior Manager (Human Resource Department)
- Deanne M. Ford - Supervisor (Uninsured Collections)

== See also ==
- California Low Cost Auto Insurance Program
- Georgia Electronic Insurance Compliance System
