= Georgia District Church of the Nazarene =

District of the Church of the Nazarene

The Georgia Nazarene District is the umbrella organization of Church of the Nazarene congregations in the U.S. state of Georgia. It was officially created in 1915. It currently oversees 102 Nazarene Churches and a Nazarene campground located in the small town of Adrian.

== History ==
The first Nazarene Church in the state of Georgia was located in Donalsonville where T.J. Shingler and his family help support and build a church for Georgia Nazarenes. Originally a part of the Georgia Holiness Association, this group of believers joined with another holiness group in 1907. The holiness movement in Georgia can be traced back to the revival led by John Wesley in England.

== Leadership ==
The district is led by an elected superintendent. The current district superintendent is Stephen Rhoades.

The district superintendent and district treasurer work out of the district office located in McDonough, Georgia. Six district offices are also filled by local pastors and layman of the Georgia district. These offices include the District Secretary, Cross-Cultural Ministries Coordinator, Sunday School Ministries Chairman, Missions President (NMI), Youth President (NYI), and the District Camp Manager.

== See also ==
- Church of the Nazarene (disambiguation)
