= Plug-in electric vehicles in Georgia (U.S. state) =

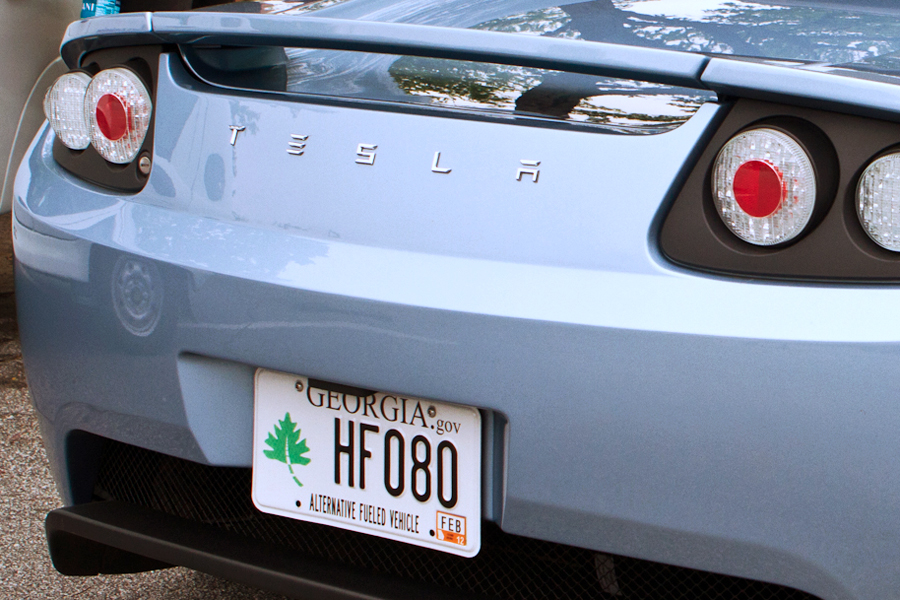
Tesla Roadster with Georgia's Alternative Fuel Vehicle (AFV) license plate, which allows access to high occupancy vehicle lanes (HOV) regardless of number of passengers

As of 2021, there were about 24,000 electric vehicles in the U.S. state of Georgia, accounting for 1.0% of all vehicles in the state.

== Government policy ==
Initially, the state offered a $5,000 tax credit for electric vehicle purchases. This tax credit was repealed in 2015, and replaced with an annual fee for electric vehicle registration; this fee was set at $214 in 2021.

Until 2018, all vehicles displaying an alternative fuel license plate had access to high-occupancy vehicle lanes in Georgia.

As of February 2022, vehicle manufacturers are prohibited from selling vehicles directly to consumers in Georgia; however, several bills have been proposed in the state legislature to exempt electric vehicles from this ban.

== Charging stations ==
As of 2021, there were about 1,500 charging station locations in the state, with about 3,800 charging ports.

The Infrastructure Investment and Jobs Act, signed into law in November 2021, allocates US$135 million to be spent on charging stations in Georgia.

== Manufacturing ==
Georgia is home to a large electric vehicle manufacturing industry. According to Governor Brian Kemp, the state is "now a world leader in electric vehicles and electric mobility".

== By region ==
=== Albany ===
The first public charging station in Albany was installed in 2021.

=== Atlanta ===
In December 2021, Rivian announced plans to open the state's largest electric vehicle manufacturing plant in Morgan County. The construction of the plant has been supported by Governor Kemp, but opposed by several Republican politicians, including former U.S. Senator David Perdue.

=== Augusta ===
As of May 2022, there were no electric vehicles in the Augusta city fleet.

=== Columbus ===
As of December 2020, there were two public charging stations in Columbus.

=== Macon ===
The first public charging station in Macon was installed in 2012.

=== Savannah ===
The first electric vehicle in the Savannah city fleet was introduced in January 2022.

=== Valdosta ===
As of December 2016, there was one public charging stations in Valdosta.
