= Climate of Georgia (U.S. state) =

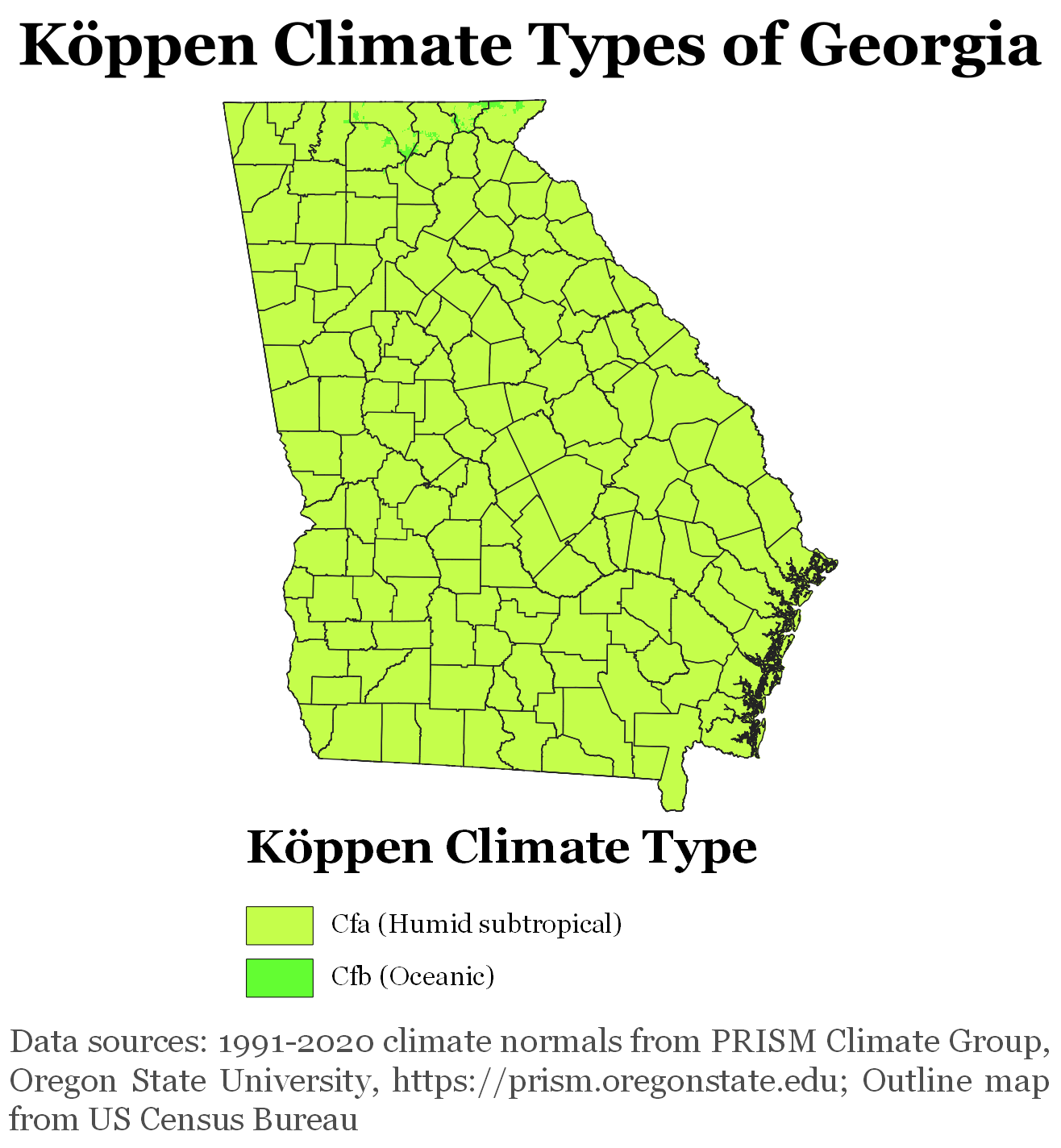
Köppen climate types of Georgia, using 1991-2020 climate normals.

The climate of Georgia is a humid subtropical climate, with most of the state having short, mild winters and long, hot summers. The Atlantic Ocean on the east coast of Georgia and the hill country in the north impact the state's climate. Also, the Chattahoochee River divides Georgia into separate climatic regions with the mountain region to the northwest being cooler than the rest of the state; the average temperatures for the mountain region in January and July are 39 °F (4 °C) and 78 °F (26 °C) respectively. Winter in Georgia is characterized by mild temperatures and little snowfall around the state, with the potential for snow and ice increasing in the northern parts of the state. Occasionally, Arctic air masses can cause snowfall. Summer daytime temperatures in Georgia often exceed 95 °F (35 °C). The state experiences widespread precipitation. Tornadoes and tropical cyclones are common.

== Temperatures ==
Most of Georgia has a sub-tropical climate, with hot and humid summers, except at the highest elevations. Weather conditions in various localities of Georgia depend on how close they are to the Atlantic Ocean or Gulf of Mexico, and their altitude. This is especially true in the mountainous areas in the northern part of the state, which are farther away from ocean waters and can be up to 4,500 feet (1,400 m) or higher above sea level. The areas near the Florida-Georgia border, extending from the Atlantic Ocean westward to the Chattahoochee River, experience the most subtropical weather, similar to that of Florida: hot, humid summers with frequent afternoon thunderstorms and mild, somewhat drier winters. The USDA Hardiness Zones for Georgia range from Zone 7A (0 °F to 5 °F) in the mountains to Zone 9B (25 °F to 30 °F) along portions of the coast.

Despite having moderate weather compared to many other states, Georgia has occasional extreme weather. The highest temperature ever recorded is 112 °F (44 °C), while the lowest ever recorded is −17 °F (−27 °C). Heat waves with temperatures over 100 °F (38 °C) have often been recorded.

== Precipitation ==
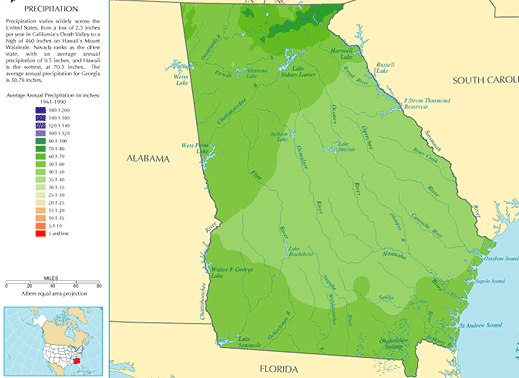
Average annual precipitation for Georgia

The entire state, including the North Georgia mountains, receives moderate to heavy rain, which varies from 45 inches (1,100 mm) in central Georgia to approximately 75 inches (1,900 mm) around the Northeast part of the state. Georgia has had severe droughts in the past, especially in 2007. Tropical Storm Alberto in July 1994 looped across central Georgia, leading to 24-hour rainfall amounts exceeding 20 inches (510 mm) across central sections of the state. It also became the wettest tropical cyclone on record for the state of Georgia, eclipsing the record set in 1929. Snowfall, which occurs in most winters, increases in frequency and average amounts per year to the north.

== Winter ==
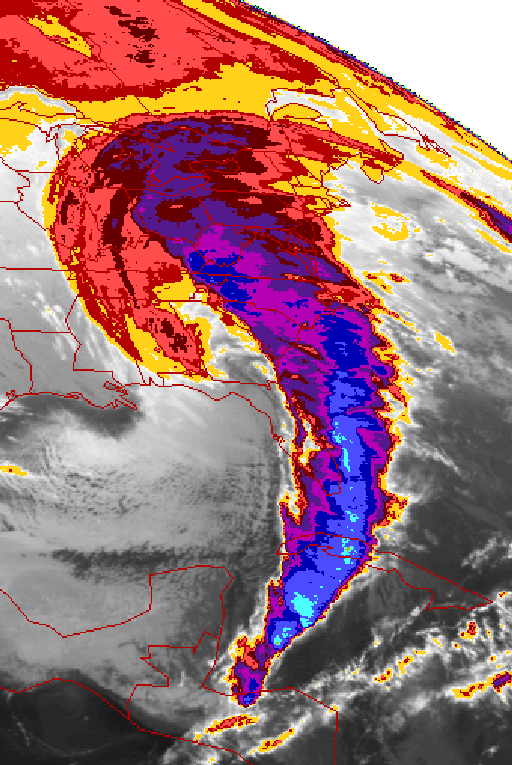
Image of March 1993 Storm of the Century

Southern and southeast areas of the state experience snow much less frequently than other parts of Georgia. The Georgia Piedmont, sometimes referred to as the Blue Ridge province, is somewhat cooler in winter than the coastal areas. The Southern areas of Piedmont may receive snow every other year, while areas close to the foothills get snow a couple of times a year averaging anywhere from a trace up 2 inches (5.1 cm) of annual snowfall. The biggest winter threat to the northern piedmont is freezing rain which is rain that freezes on contact. The mountains of Georgia have the coolest climate and most frequent snowfall in the state, although snowfall is less than any other part of the Appalachian Mountains. The exception to this is the mountain counties of Fannin, Gilmer, Pickens, Union, White and Rabun. The mountains can average between 10 and 46 centimeters (4 and 18 inches) annually. Surrounding counties typically average 7.6 to 20.3 centimeters (3 to 8 inches) of snow annually. Elevations over 1,200 meters (4,000 feet) can have particularly brutal winters with some storms blanketing the mountains with over a foot of snow. The mountains above 1,100 meters (3,500 feet) or parts of the Appalachian trail average 25–64 centimeters (10–25 inches) of snow in one season. The highest mountain in Georgia, Brasstown Bald, averages 76–102 centimeters (30–40 inches) of snow per season. Heavy snow in the extreme northern counties is considered 5 inches (13 cm) or more of snow in a 12-hour period or 7 inches (18 cm) or more of snow in a 24-hour period". Watches for heavy snow are issued when a 50 percent or greater chance of 2 inches (5.1 cm) or more of snow falling in a 12-hour period, or 4 inches (10 cm) or more in a 24-hour period is expected.

Winter weather watches are issued when there is a "50 percent or greater chance of significant and damaging accumulations of ice during freezing rain situations"; these watches are normally issued 12 to 48 hours in advance. A winter storm warning for an ice storm means that icy conditions are "occurring, imminent, or have a very high probability of occurring". These warnings are usually issued when there is an 80 percent or greater chance of meeting ice storm conditions.

Blizzards in Georgia are rare. The last blizzard the state had was in March 1993.

Winter in southern Georgia, which lasts from December to January, are much more mild. Daytime highs range from approximately 50 °F (10 °C) in the northernmost interior areas to near 70 °F (21 °C) along the coast and in the extreme south.

Winters in Georgia are determined by the Pacific Ocean. During El Niño, the jet stream is located along the Southern U.S., allowing for colder and wetter conditions with greater snowfall. The opposite phase, La Niña, keeps the jet stream farther north, thus winters are warmer and drier across Georgia.

== Spring ==
Weather during springtime in North Georgia and the mountains changes from day to day and year to year. Early spring in the North Georgia Mountains can be very chilly during the day; average highs are near 62 °F (17 °C). The weather can be highly variable with temperatures ranging between 75 °F (24 °C) and 40 °F (4 °C). The rainiest time of the year is normally April, which can also be a windy month where daytime temperatures can rise to near 75 °F (24 °C) and evening temperatures fall to around 40 °F (4 °C).

== Summer ==
Summers are hot and humid with temperatures in the afternoons that reach, on average, to near 90 °F (32 °C). Overnight lows fall to near 68 °F (20 °C) and there is usually an 8 °F (4 °C) difference in temperature between the mountains and Atlanta. While humidity in North Georgia, especially in the mountains, can be high it is not as high as it is in South Georgia. Summer thunderstorms add to the humidity in the area by providing 4.5 inches (110 mm) to 5.5 inches (140 mm) of rain during the summer months.

=== Tropical cyclones ===
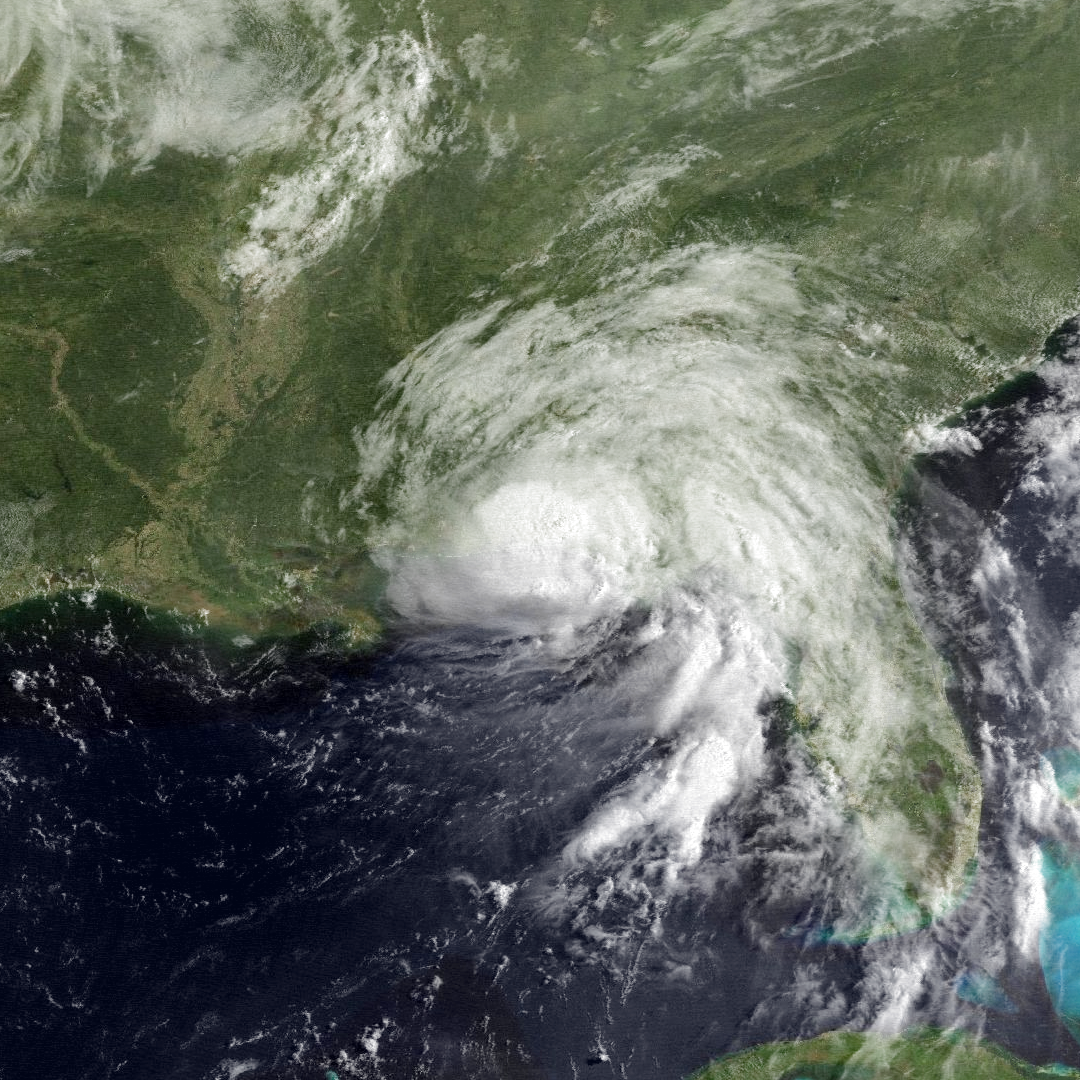
Tropical Storm Alberto (1994) moving into Georgia

Although Georgia experiences many tropical cyclones, it only rarely experiences a direct hurricane strike due to its fairly small coastline. The last hurricane to directly affect the Georgia coastline was Hurricane David in 1979. The last major hurricane (Category 3 or higher) to hit the Georgia coast directly was in 1898. More common are hurricanes which strike the Florida Panhandle, weaken over land, and bring tropical storm or hurricane-force winds and heavy rain to the Georgia interior (especially the southwestern areas), as well as hurricanes that come close to the Georgia coastline, brushing the coast on their way up to hit the Carolinas.

=== Tornadoes ===
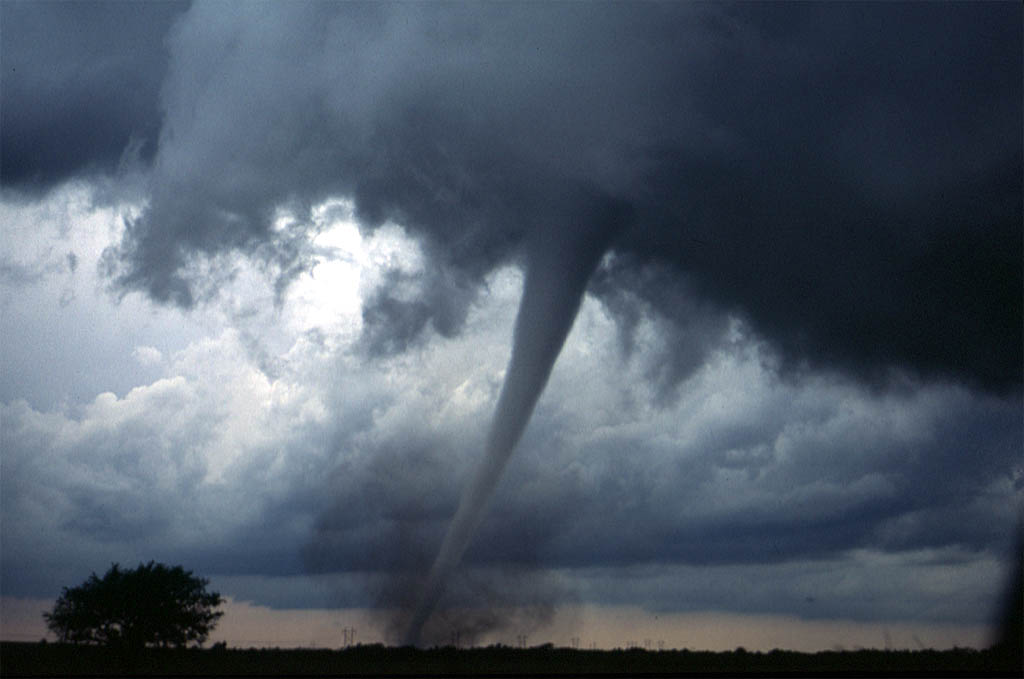
Image of a tornado

Georgia is one of the leading states in incidents of tornadoes though they are rarely stronger than F1 . Southwestern and northern sections of the state have historically reported the largest amount of tornadoes. The areas closest to the Florida border report F0 and F1 tornadoes associated with summer afternoon thunderstorms. However, tornadoes of F3 intensity or greater within Georgia are uncommon, with three events reported on average each year.

== Fall ==
Georgia's autumns are normally sunny and cool. September and October, the driest months of the year, qualify as "Indian Summer" weather with temperatures that are near 78 °F (26 °C) during the daytime. At night, the temperature drops to near 50 °F (10 °C). It is much cooler in November with an average high of 62 °F (17 °C) and low of 36 °F (2 °C). The first freeze of the year normally falls within November, except in the northern mountains, where it occurs in October.

== Statistics for selected cities ==
Climate data for Atlanta (Hartsfield–Jackson Int'l), 1991–2020 normals (Note: Mean monthly maxima and minima (i.e. the highest and lowest temperature readings during an entire month or year) calculated based on data at said location from 1991 to 2020.), extremes 1878–present (Note: Official records for Atlanta were kept at the Weather Bureau in downtown from October 1878 to August 1928, and at Hartsfield–Jackson Int'l since September 1928.)
Month	Jan	Feb	Mar	Apr	May	Jun	Jul	Aug	Sep	Oct	Nov	Dec	Year
Record high °F (°C)	79 (26)	81 (27)	89 (32)	93 (34)	97 (36)	106 (41)	105 (41)	104 (40)	102 (39)	98 (37)	84 (29)	79 (26)	106 (41)
Mean maximum °F (°C)	70.3 (21.3)	73.5 (23.1)	80.8 (27.1)	84.7 (29.3)	89.6 (32.0)	94.3 (34.6)	95.8 (35.4)	95.9 (35.5)	91.9 (33.3)	85.0 (29.4)	77.5 (25.3)	71.5 (21.9)	97.3 (36.3)
Mean daily maximum °F (°C)	54.0 (12.2)	58.2 (14.6)	65.9 (18.8)	73.8 (23.2)	81.1 (27.3)	87.1 (30.6)	90.1 (32.3)	89.0 (31.7)	83.9 (28.8)	74.4 (23.6)	64.1 (17.8)	56.2 (13.4)	73.2 (22.9)
Daily mean °F (°C)	44.8 (7.1)	48.5 (9.2)	55.6 (13.1)	63.2 (17.3)	71.2 (21.8)	77.9 (25.5)	80.9 (27.2)	80.2 (26.8)	74.9 (23.8)	64.7 (18.2)	54.2 (12.3)	47.3 (8.5)	63.6 (17.6)
Mean daily minimum °F (°C)	35.6 (2.0)	38.9 (3.8)	45.3 (7.4)	52.5 (11.4)	61.3 (16.3)	68.6 (20.3)	71.8 (22.1)	71.3 (21.8)	65.9 (18.8)	54.9 (12.7)	44.2 (6.8)	38.4 (3.6)	54.1 (12.3)
Mean minimum °F (°C)	17.3 (−8.2)	23.2 (−4.9)	28.1 (−2.2)	36.9 (2.7)	47.6 (8.7)	59.9 (15.5)	65.6 (18.7)	64.5 (18.1)	53.4 (11.9)	38.7 (3.7)	29.2 (−1.6)	23.8 (−4.6)	15.2 (−9.3)
Record low °F (°C)	−8 (−22)	−9 (−23)	10 (−12)	25 (−4)	37 (3)	39 (4)	53 (12)	55 (13)	36 (2)	28 (−2)	3 (−16)	0 (−18)	−9 (−23)
Average precipitation inches (mm)	4.59 (117)	4.55 (116)	4.68 (119)	3.81 (97)	3.56 (90)	4.54 (115)	4.75 (121)	4.30 (109)	3.82 (97)	3.28 (83)	3.98 (101)	4.57 (116)	50.43 (1,281)
Average snowfall inches (cm)	1.0 (2.5)	0.4 (1.0)	0.4 (1.0)	0.0 (0.0)	0.0 (0.0)	0.0 (0.0)	0.0 (0.0)	0.0 (0.0)	0.0 (0.0)	0.0 (0.0)	0.0 (0.0)	0.4 (1.0)	2.2 (5.6)
Average precipitation days (≥ 0.01 in)	11.1	10.4	10.5	8.9	9.4	11.1	12.0	10.2	7.3	6.8	7.9	10.7	116.3
Average snowy days (≥ 0.01 in)	0.7	0.3	0.1	0.0	0.0	0.0	0.0	0.0	0.0	0.0	0.0	0.4	1.5
Average relative humidity (%)	67.6	63.4	62.4	61.0	67.2	69.8	74.4	74.8	73.9	68.5	68.1	68.4	68.3
Average dew point °F (°C)	29.3 (−1.5)	30.9 (−0.6)	38.5 (3.6)	45.7 (7.6)	56.1 (13.4)	63.7 (17.6)	67.8 (19.9)	67.5 (19.7)	62.1 (16.7)	49.6 (9.8)	41.0 (5.0)	33.1 (0.6)	48.8 (9.3)
Mean monthly sunshine hours	164.0	171.7	220.5	261.2	288.6	284.8	273.8	258.6	227.5	238.5	185.1	164.0	2,738.3
Percentage possible sunshine	52	56	59	67	67	66	63	62	61	68	59	53	62
Average ultraviolet index	2.8	4.1	6.1	7.9	9.1	9.7	9.9	9.2	7.4	5.2	3.3	2.5	6.4
Source 1: NOAA (relative humidity, dew point and sun 1961–1990)
Source 2: Extremes UV Index Today (1995 to 2022)

Climate data for Savannah, Georgia (Savannah/Hilton Head Int'l), 1991–2020 normals, (Note: Mean monthly maxima and minima (i.e. the expected highest and lowest temperature readings at any point during the year or given month) calculated based on data at said location from 1991 to 2020.) extremes 1871–present (Note: Official records for Savannah were kept at downtown from January 1871 to April 1945, Hunter Field from May 1945 to September 1950, and at Savannah/Hilton Head Int'l since October 1950. For more information, see ThreadEx.)
Month	Jan	Feb	Mar	Apr	May	Jun	Jul	Aug	Sep	Oct	Nov	Dec	Year
Record high °F (°C)	84 (29)	87 (31)	94 (34)	95 (35)	102 (39)	104 (40)	105 (41)	104 (40)	102 (39)	97 (36)	89 (32)	83 (28)	105 (41)
Mean maximum °F (°C)	77.5 (25.3)	80.9 (27.2)	84.9 (29.4)	89.1 (31.7)	94.0 (34.4)	97.5 (36.4)	98.8 (37.1)	97.6 (36.4)	94.0 (34.4)	88.6 (31.4)	83.3 (28.5)	78.2 (25.7)	99.7 (37.6)
Mean daily maximum °F (°C)	61.4 (16.3)	65.1 (18.4)	71.4 (21.9)	78.2 (25.7)	84.7 (29.3)	89.6 (32.0)	92.3 (33.5)	90.8 (32.7)	86.4 (30.2)	79.0 (26.1)	70.2 (21.2)	63.7 (17.6)	77.7 (25.4)
Daily mean °F (°C)	50.7 (10.4)	54.0 (12.2)	60.0 (15.6)	66.7 (19.3)	74.1 (23.4)	80.1 (26.7)	83.0 (28.3)	82.1 (27.8)	77.7 (25.4)	68.8 (20.4)	59.1 (15.1)	53.2 (11.8)	67.5 (19.7)
Mean daily minimum °F (°C)	40.0 (4.4)	42.9 (6.1)	48.6 (9.2)	55.2 (12.9)	63.4 (17.4)	70.7 (21.5)	73.7 (23.2)	73.3 (22.9)	69.0 (20.6)	58.6 (14.8)	48.0 (8.9)	42.6 (5.9)	57.2 (14.0)
Mean minimum °F (°C)	23.3 (−4.8)	26.5 (−3.1)	31.2 (−0.4)	39.4 (4.1)	49.8 (9.9)	62.7 (17.1)	68.6 (20.3)	67.2 (19.6)	57.1 (13.9)	42.1 (5.6)	31.4 (−0.3)	26.9 (−2.8)	21.6 (−5.8)
Record low °F (°C)	3 (−16)	8 (−13)	20 (−7)	28 (−2)	39 (4)	49 (9)	61 (16)	57 (14)	43 (6)	28 (−2)	15 (−9)	9 (−13)	3 (−16)
Average precipitation inches (mm)	3.28 (83)	2.80 (71)	3.50 (89)	3.39 (86)	3.62 (92)	6.65 (169)	5.75 (146)	5.46 (139)	4.35 (110)	3.72 (94)	2.39 (61)	3.21 (82)	48.12 (1,222)
Average precipitation days (≥ 0.01 in)	8.5	7.8	7.9	6.7	7.3	12.3	12.4	12.8	9.9	6.8	6.8	8.4	107.6
Average relative humidity (%)	69.6	67.0	66.8	65.4	70.1	73.6	76.0	78.6	77.7	72.9	72.3	70.8	71.7
Average dew point °F (°C)	37.0 (2.8)	38.8 (3.8)	45.7 (7.6)	51.6 (10.9)	60.8 (16.0)	67.8 (19.9)	71.2 (21.8)	71.6 (22.0)	67.5 (19.7)	56.5 (13.6)	48.0 (8.9)	40.5 (4.7)	54.8 (12.6)
Mean monthly sunshine hours	175.5	181.0	232.0	275.6	288.9	276.0	271.3	245.8	214.3	228.6	193.5	174.2	2,756.7
Percentage possible sunshine	55	59	62	71	67	65	62	60	58	65	61	56	62
Source: NOAA (relative humidity, dew point and sun 1961–1990)

== Climate change ==
Climate change in Georgia encompasses the effects of climate change, attributed to man-made increases in atmospheric carbon dioxide, in the U.S. state of Georgia.

Studies show that Georgia is among a string of "Deep South" states that will experience the worst effects of climate change, with effects including "more severe floods and drought", and higher water levels "eroding beaches, submerging low lands, and exacerbating coastal flooding."

In coming decades, climate change will cause higher temperatures, and more severe flooding and droughts in the state, according to a 2016 pamphlet published by the United States Environmental Protection Agency (EPA). The temperature changes will increase the risk of heat stroke and other heat-related illnesses.

== See also ==
- List of wettest known tropical cyclones in Georgia
