= Linda W. Hunter =

American judge

Judge Linda W. Hunter is a DeKalb County, Georgia Superior Court Judge in Division 8. She is a graduate of Northwestern University and the University of Georgia School of Law. She was appointed to the DeKalb State Court by Governor Joe Frank Harris in 1987. Governor Zell Miller appointed her to DeKalb Superior Court in 1991.
