= Georgia (U.S. state) wiretapping laws =

Georgia wiretapping laws are regulated under O.C.G.A. § 16-11-62, § 16-11-64, and § 16-11-66. The law divides wiretapping into two categories, recording conversations (audio) and recording actions (photos and videos).

Conversations in private places are banned from third party audio recording and a member of a conversation can covertly record the conversation without the consent of others. Conversations that occur in public can be recorded by a third party (see O.C.G.A. § 16-11-62).

Recording actions in public places without the consent of those being recorded is legal. Recording actions in a private place that is out of public view requires the consent of all those being recorded (see O.C.G.A. § 16-11-62). The law has further clauses regarding recording actions of individuals under 18 as well as when it is on one's own property.

== Examples ==
A person can "tap" his or her own phone and record the conversation without the permission of the person to whom they are talking. That is because the person is consenting to the recording and they are actively involved in the conversation being recorded.

A person may have a small tape recorder with a microphone (like a lapel mike) attached somewhere on their person whether visible or not. It is legal to record a conversation they have without the other party's consent. This is because the recorder is consenting to the recording and Georgia state recording law is a one party consent rule.

== See also ==
- Law of Georgia (U.S. state)
