= GCI coach =

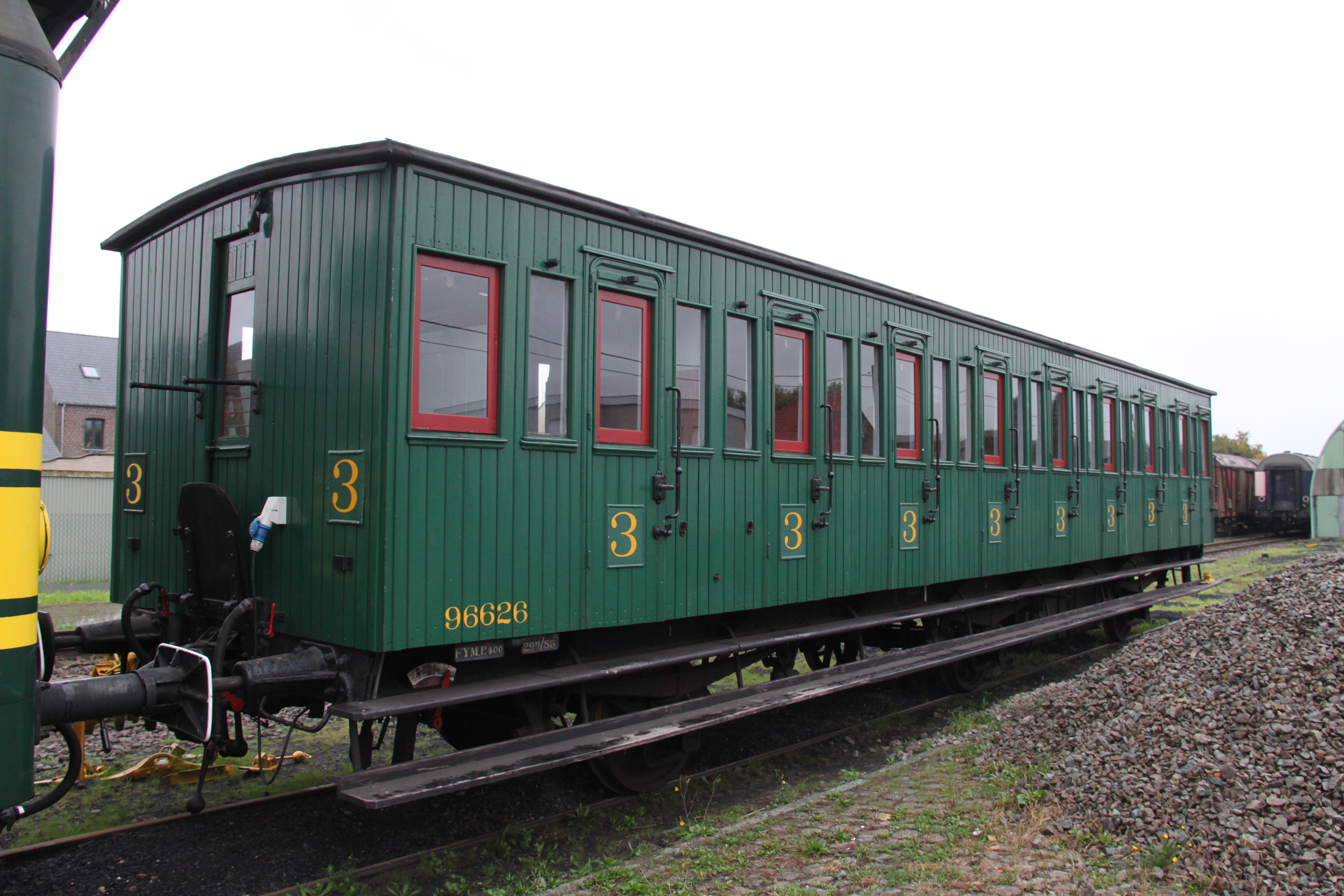
A preserved GCI coach

GCI was a class of Belgian passenger carriage. GCI were introduced in the beginning of the 20th century. They had a metal frame but the body was made of wood. They are based on GC coaches, which stood for "Large capacity" conveniently in both French and Dutch, they were indeed larger than any previous NMBS/SNCB coaches; they were the first to have three axles but most of them had fully separate compartments, that could only be reached from outside. On GCI coaches, a side corridor was provided, at the inconvenience of reducing seating capacity; from 96 to 80 in 3rd class. Most of them had an open platform and a toilet at the other end but on some cars the toilet was omitted and replaced by a second platform and a few 3rd class cars had both a toilet and an enclosed platform (fitted with folding seats). The name I in the name GCI was indicating interconnection.

While GC cars were withdrawn shortly before WWII, GCI railcars were used until 1966. The heritage Dendermonde–Puurs Steam Railway in Belgium operates one fully restored GCI, and possesses more GCIs that are waiting to be restored. Also the Chemin de Fer à vapeur des Trois Vallées operates a few of these cars, as do some heritage railways in The Netherlands and Luxemburg.

== In the media ==
These coaches were the mainstay of Belgian passenger rail traffic just after WW2; they can be seen in several comic books of the era. One example is the Piet Pienter en Bert Bibber album Het raadsel van de Schimmenburcht; another is the Suske en Wiske story De Bokkerijders.

Paul Delvaux showed GCI carriages in his Station Forestière painting of 1960.
