= Georgia Council for International Visitors =

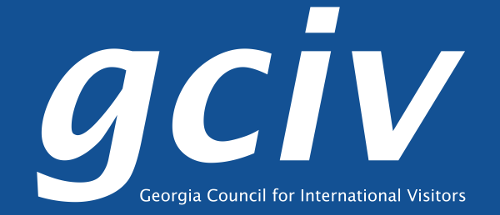
- Founded: 1962
- Type: 501(c)(3) non-profit
- Purpose: Citizen diplomacy
- Location: Atlanta, Georgia, United States
- Key people: Shell Stuart (executive director)
- Employees: 3
- Website: gciv.org

The Georgia Council for International Visitors (GCIV) is headquartered in Atlanta, Georgia and is part of the Global Ties U.S. national network.

The mission of GCIV is to build relationships between the people of Georgia and leaders around the world. The vision is that every citizen of the State of Georgia has the opportunity to be more globally engaged.

== History ==
GCIV is a nonprofit organization founded in 1962, coinciding with Atlanta leaders working to establish Atlanta as the growing southern city not impacted by racial discord. Atlanta was promoted as the "city too busy to hate" in the formative years of GCIV.

GCIV played an early role in positioning Atlanta as an international city. GCIV now works with the United States Department of State in developing professional and cultural exchange programs for emerging global leaders. The non-partisan citizen diplomacy programs developed by GCIV give Georgians unique opportunities to share best practices and insights, plus form friendships with distinguished visitors, many of whom are seeing the United States for the first time.

GCIV administers the U.S. Department of State's International Visitor Leadership Program (IVLP) in Georgia. Launched in 1940, the IVLP seeks to build mutual understanding between the United States and other nations through carefully designed professional visits to the U.S. for current and emerging foreign leaders. U.S. ambassadors consistently rank the IVLP as most effective in a long list of public diplomacy tools at their disposal.
