= Grating-coupled interferometry =

Grating-coupled interferometry (GCI) is a biophysical characterization method mainly used in biochemistry and drug discovery for label-free analysis of molecular interactions. Similar to other optical methods such as surface plasmon resonance (SPR) or bio-layer interferometry (BLI), it is based on measuring refractive index changes within an evanescent field near a sensor surface. After immobilizing a target to the sensor surface, analyte molecules in solution which bind to that target cause a small increase in local refractive index. By monitoring these refractive changes over time characteristics such as kinetic rates and affinity constants of the analyte-target binding, or analyte concentrations, can be determined.

== Explanation ==
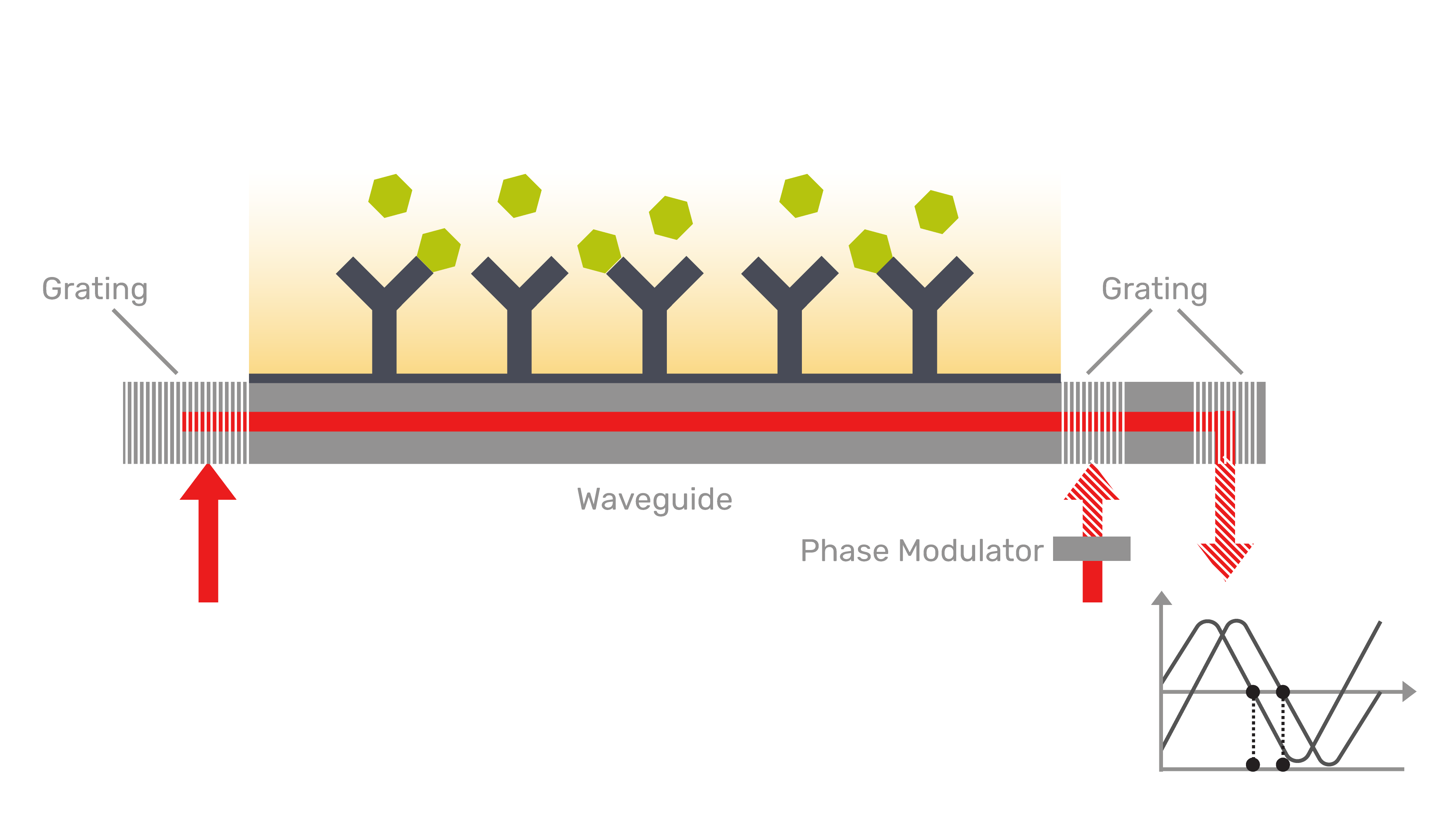
Grating-Coupled Interferometry schematics

GCI is based on phase-shifting waveguide interferometry. Light of the sensing arm of the interferometer is coupled into a monomode waveguide through a first grating, and undergoes a phase change until it reaches a second grating, depending on the local refractive index within the evanescent field (see image). The second grating is used for coupling in light of the reference arm of the interferometer, and interference created by the superposition of the sensing and reference waves after the second grating translates the phase changes into an intensity modulation. By rapid phase modulation of one of the arms using a liquid crystal element, and thanks to the long interaction length with the sample, extremely high sensitivities with respect to surface refractive index can be achieved even at acquisition rates above 10 Hz. Since the interference is created on chip and not through free-space propagation, a high robustness with respect to ambient disturbances such as vibrations or temperature changes is achieved.

== See also ==
- Receptor–ligand kinetics
- Affinity
- Ligand binding assay
- Immunoassay
- Label-free quantification
