= Anne Arundel Medical Center =

Geography
- Location: Annapolis, Maryland, United States
- Coordinates: 38°59′25″N 76°32′4″W

Organization
- Type: Community

Services
- Emergency department: Yes
- Beds: 385

History
- Founded: July 18, 1902; 123 years ago

Links
- Website: https://www.luminishealth.org/en/locations/lhaamc?language_content_entity=en
- Lists: Hospitals in Maryland

The Anne Arundel Medical Center (AAMC) is a regional health system headquartered in Annapolis, Maryland. In addition to the main campus in Annapolis, the group has outpatient pavilions in Bowie, Kent Island, Odenton, Easton, and Waugh Chapel.

== History ==
At the turn of the 20th century, the growth of Annapolis as an educational and government center spurred the need for better health care. On February 17, 1902, papers were filed with the Anne Arundel County Circuit Court by the Annapolis Emergency Hospital Association to establish a local hospital. Land was purchased on March 31 of that year at the corner of Franklin and Cathedral Streets in downtown Annapolis, Maryland. On July 18, 1902, the Annapolis Emergency Hospital opened.

In 1959, the hospital, now known as Anne Arundel General Hospital, achieved full accreditation from The Joint Commission on the Accreditation of Hospitals in July 1958, an honor that only around half of the hospitals in the country enjoyed at that time.

Over the years, the hospital outgrew the original building and plans were developed to start building the hospitals current Medical Park location. In 1984, 104 acres of land were purchased, and, in 1987, ground broke on the building of an MRI center, an oncology center, and an outpatient surgery center. Construction on the Rebecca M. Clatanoff Pavilion, the hospital's women's services and birth center, began in 1993.

The hospital officially changed its name to Anne Arundel Medical Center and housed all buildings and campuses under the name Anne Arundel Health System.

Plans moved forward in 1998 to consolidate all services at Medical Park with the commencement of construction of the Acute Care Pavilion. After it opened on December 2, 2001, patients were moved from the downtown Annapolis campus to the new location on Jennifer Road.

In 2007, expansion began at the Medical Park campus with the building of several new garages and the Health Sciences Pavilion. In 2009, the pavilion opened, offering an expanded Breast Center, outpatient rehab programs, and doctor's offices.

In 2008, construction began on an expanded acute care tower and emergency department. The newest tower opened in April 2011. Due to its concentration on green construction, at the time the tower was the only LEED Certified Gold patient care tower in Maryland.

Additionally, during 2014, the hospital announced it would no longer hire people that used nicotine.

== Services ==
=== Women's and children's services ===
Services offered include all-inclusive maternity, newborn and pediatric care; advanced treatments for health challenges women and their families may encounter; and extensive screening, prevention and wellness programs.

=== The Breast Center ===
The Breast Center is an affiliate of Anne Arundel Medical Center.

=== The Geaton and JoAnn DeCesaris Cancer Institute ===
The Geaton and JoAnn DeCesaris Cancer Institute encompasses a large array of services ranging from prevention, screening, diagnosis and treatment through survivorship. Many different types of professionals contribute to the care of patients. The center offers support services for patients and families, including nurse navigation, education, genetic counseling, support groups, social work and psychology services.

AAMC was the first hospital in Maryland to offer minimally invasive robotic surgery using the da Vinci robotic surgery system. This machine enables physicians to perform the most complex procedures using very small incisions. The robotic arm optimizes hand movements, providing exceptional dexterity and control. In addition, the surgical team is able to view 3D images magnified 10 times, which allows them to manipulate tiny instruments in spaces that are otherwise beyond their reach.

Cancers are effectively treated by utilizing technologies such as Intensity Modulated Radiation Therapy (IMRT), high dose radiation (HDR) and Novalis stereotactic radiosurgery and radiotherapy. Noninvasive Novalis is especially useful for treating tumors in places too difficult to reach using conventional surgical methods.

Using Positron Emission Tomography (PET) combined with Computed Tomography (CT) physicians can search for the distinct metabolic signature of cancer cells, plot the exact location, shape and size of a tumor, and recommend the best treatment.

The Patient and Family Services program streamlines patient access to information and people who can help with psychosocial, emotional and spiritual issues.

=== Heart and Vascular Institute ===
In 1966, the Coronary Care Unit (CCU) opened.

Over the last decade, the heart and vascular program has grown dramatically. The Heart & Vascular Institute features a dedicated Heart and Vascular Unit, vascular screening programs, vascular surgery and treatment, cardiac-catheterization, interventional medicine, emergency and elective angioplasty, cardiopulmonary rehabilitation and interventional radiology. AAMC is also a designated cardiac intervention center (CIC), and participates in the C-PORT E program, offering elective angioplasty services to the community.

=== The Joint Center ===
The AAMC Joint Center is a unit solely focused on joint replacement surgery.

=== The Spine Center ===
The multidisciplinary team includes physicians, and clinical and support staff who specialize in neurosurgery, orthopedic surgery, physiatry (physical medicine and rehabilitation), and interventional radiology.

Conditions Treated (cervical and lumbar):

Degenerative Disorders

- Disc disease
- Sciatica
- Radiculopathy
- Disc herniation
- Spinal stenosis
- Spondylolisthesis
- Myelopathies
- Kyphosis
- Tumors, & fractures

Spinal Deformities

- Kyphosis
- Spondylolisthesis
- Spinal Tumors
- Spinal Fractures
- Failed fusions / revisions

=== Surgical services ===
AAMC offers sub-specialty care in every area of surgery, from Breast and Vascular to Urogynecologic incontinence surgery to the busiest joint replacement program in Maryland and the District of Columbia. Minimally invasive techniques are in use throughout the full range of surgical care, from spinal surgery to laparoscopic abdominal techniques to DaVinci robotic surgery for prostate and gynecological surgery.

The surgical staff features a group of full-time in-house abdominal surgeons.
