= List of places in Georgia (U.S. state) =

This list of current cities, towns, unincorporated communities, counties, and other recognized places in the U.S. state of Georgia also includes information on the number and names of counties in which the place lies, and its lower and upper ZIP Code bounds, if applicable.

== See also ==
- Georgia (U.S. state)
- List of counties in Georgia (U.S. state)
- List of municipalities in Georgia (U.S. state)
