= Georgia Statewide Minority Business Enterprise Center =

The Georgia Statewide Minority Business Enterprise Center is funded by the U.S. Department of Commerce’s Minority Business Development Agency (MBDA) and operated by the Enterprise Innovation Institute (EI2). The MBDA Business Center (MBC), Atlanta, Ga., is part of a national network of centers established to increase the number of minority-owned businesses and strengthen existing ones.
