= Holy Rollerz =

Nonprofit Christian ministry in Kennesaw, Georgia, USA

Holy Rollerz Christian Car Club, Inc.
- Founded: 1999
- Founders: Brian Wood; Gustavo Torres
- Type: 501(c)3 nonprofit organization
- Location: Atlanta, Georgia, US
- Origins: Kennesaw, Georgia, US
- Region served: Worldwide
- Method: Christian ministry in the automotive field
- Members: 742 dues paying members, 5000+ website profiles
- Key people: Chapter presidents and officers

Holy Rollerz Christian Car Club (HRC^{3}) is a nonprofit Christian ministry started by Brian Wood and Gustavo "Gus" Torres in Kennesaw, Georgia, US. Since its beginning in 1999, it has grown to be the largest Christian automotive ministry of any kind in the world, with chapters across the United States and members across the world.

== Mission statement ==
"The Corporation is organized for charitable, educational and recreational purposes. The goal is to spread the Word of God throughout the community and to provide a positive environment for automotive enthusiasts."

== Membership ==
Membership to Holy Rollerz is through a lengthy application process. Once completed, the application is sent to the officers of the club, who include the presidents of each chapter, for review and discussion. The organization's trademark, a vinyl applique for the windshield of a member's vehicle, is then given to the new member.

== Internet forum ==
The Holy Rollerz Forum is the largest Christian automotive forum on the internet.

== Media coverage of HRC^{3} ==
Holy Rollerz Christian Car Club has been featured in many news articles, TV shows and their officers have been invited on radio shows.
