= Georgia Electronic Insurance Compliance System =

The Georgia Electronic Insurance Compliance System or GEICS is a database of all motor vehicles and the current liability insurance carried by their drivers in the U.S. state of Georgia.

It was created by the Georgia General Assembly (the state legislature) during the 2002 session, to cut down the rate of uninsured motorists. Scheduled to go into effect the following January 1, the enforcement of the statute was delayed in early 2003 to 2004 because of significant problems with the database, and the proper collection of the information which insurance companies must report for their Georgia policyholders.

When requested by police, GEICS is now the only valid proof of insurance for Georgia drivers stopped in Georgia. Other states do not have instant access to GEICS however, so paper cards must still be issued. Valid paper cards are also required of those from outside the state while driving in Georgia.

The system was run by the Georgia Department of Motor Vehicle Safety (DMVS), now the Department of Driver Services (DDS), and has over 6.7 million vehicles listed. Of those, over 470,000 (about 7%) were listed as uninsured as of November 2003, a decline from 15% in previous years. In March 2004, the DMVS announced that retroactive to the beginning of the year, it would begin issuing citations by mail, demanding a fine of 25$ from every person who showed as having a lapse in coverage, even for just one day.
