= Georgia Career Information System =

The Georgia Career Information System (GCIS) provides current, accurate occupational and educational information to schools and agencies throughout Georgia in order to help young people and adults make informed career choices. It is the main service of the Georgia Career Information Center (GCIC).

Working with educational and labor market professionals, GCIS contains assessments, explorations, and search strategies, as well as the most comprehensive and accurate state and national occupational and educational information. In addition to career management tools for individuals, tools are available to assist administrators. Each year, about 625,000 Georgians access GCIS from around 1,250 sites.

A further initiative, the Georgia Career Information System Junior (GCIS Junior) provides career development information for elementary and middle school students.
