= Climate change in Georgia (U.S. state) =

Climate change in the US state of Georgia

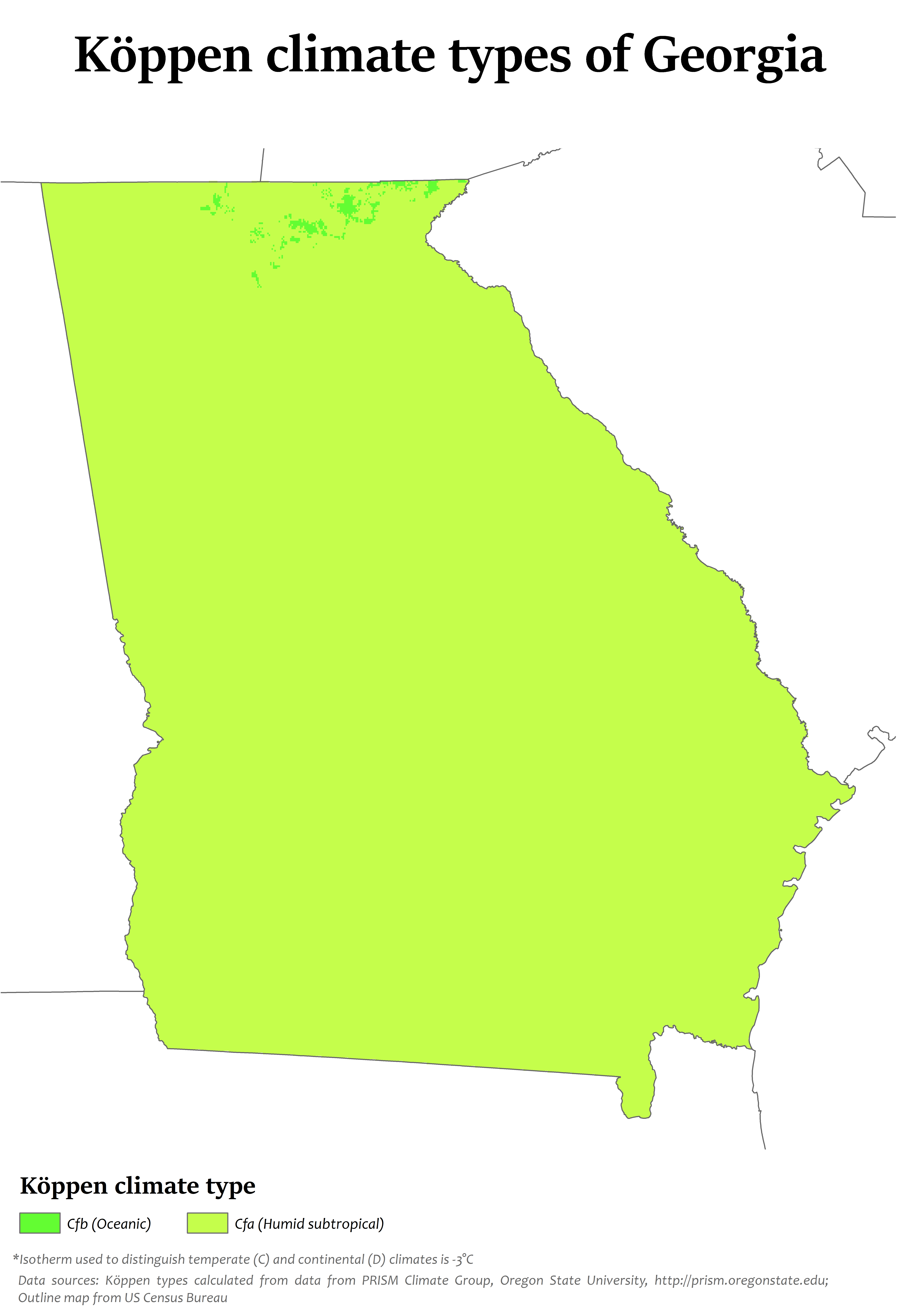
Köppen climate classification types of Georgia show almost the entire state to be humid subtropical.

Climate change in Georgia encompasses the effects of climate change, attributed to man-made increases in atmospheric carbon dioxide, in the U.S. state of Georgia.

Studies show that Georgia is among a string of "Deep South" states that will experience the worst effects of climate change, with effects including "more severe floods and drought", and higher water levels "eroding beaches, submerging low lands, and exacerbating coastal flooding."

In coming decades, climate change will cause higher temperatures, and more severe flooding and droughts in the state, according to a 2016 pamphlet published by the United States Environmental Protection Agency (EPA). The temperature changes will increase the risk of heat stroke and other heat-related illnesses.

== Environmental impacts ==
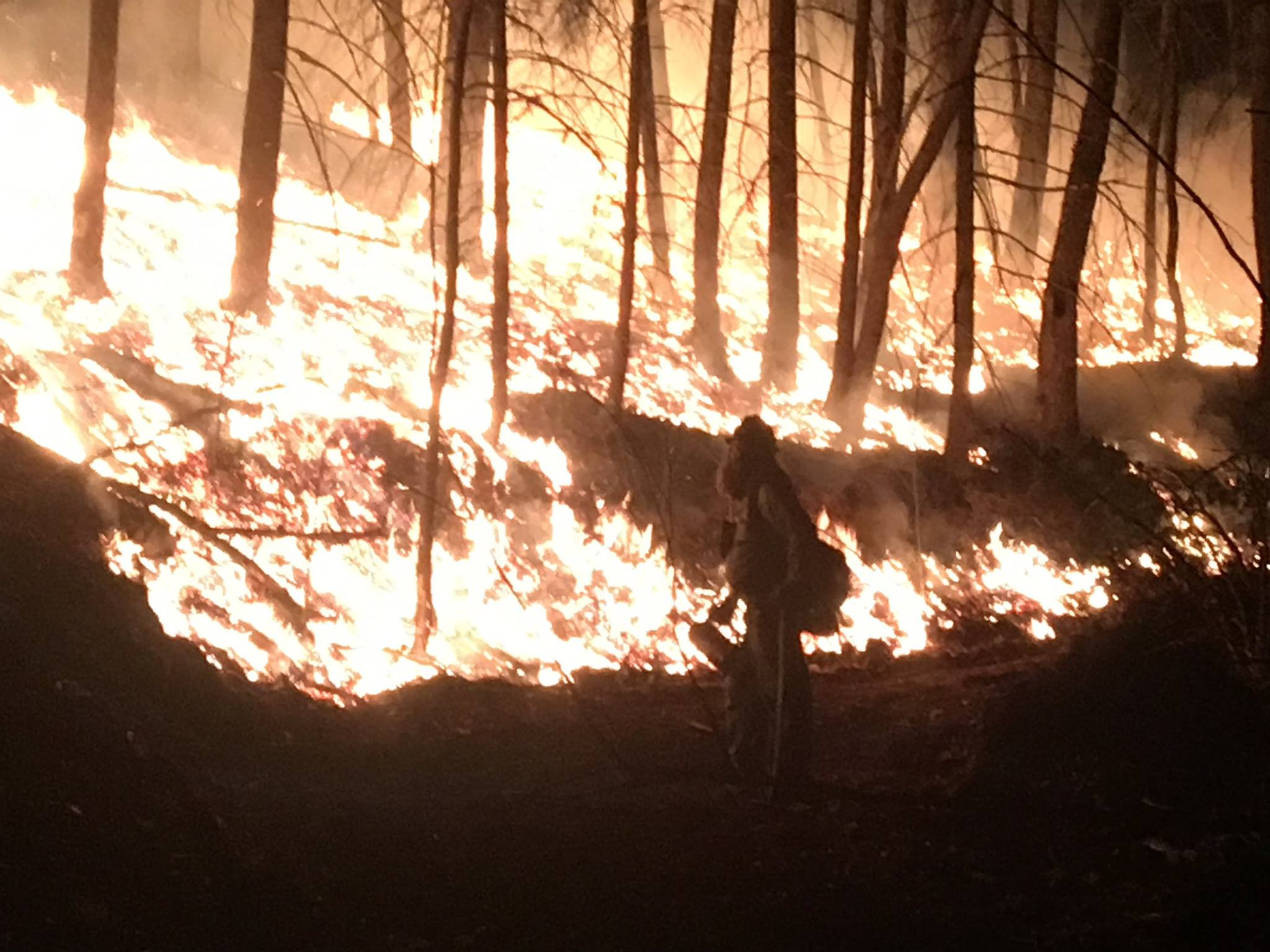
Wildfire, Chattahoochee–Oconee National Forest, 2017

=== Cold waves ===
With abundant evidence of warming, this is how marine sciences professor Marc Frischer, of the University of Georgia's Skidaway Institute of Oceanography, accounts for January 2025's extra-cold weather in Coastal Georgia “With the extremely cold weather we had last week I was hearing comments from acquaintances (many folks that I play tennis with) about the hoax that climate change was,” he wrote to The Current. “Your periodic reminder that less ice at the Arctic is consistent with a weaker jet stream that allows cold air to drift down into the Great Plains," the post reads. “The frigid temps you’re experiencing happen because of a warming planet, not despite it.”

=== Rising sea levels ===
Sea levels are expected to rise one to four feet in the next century as the oceans and atmosphere continue to warm, causing coastal areas in southeastern Georgia to be submerged.

=== Water resources, flooding, and drought ===
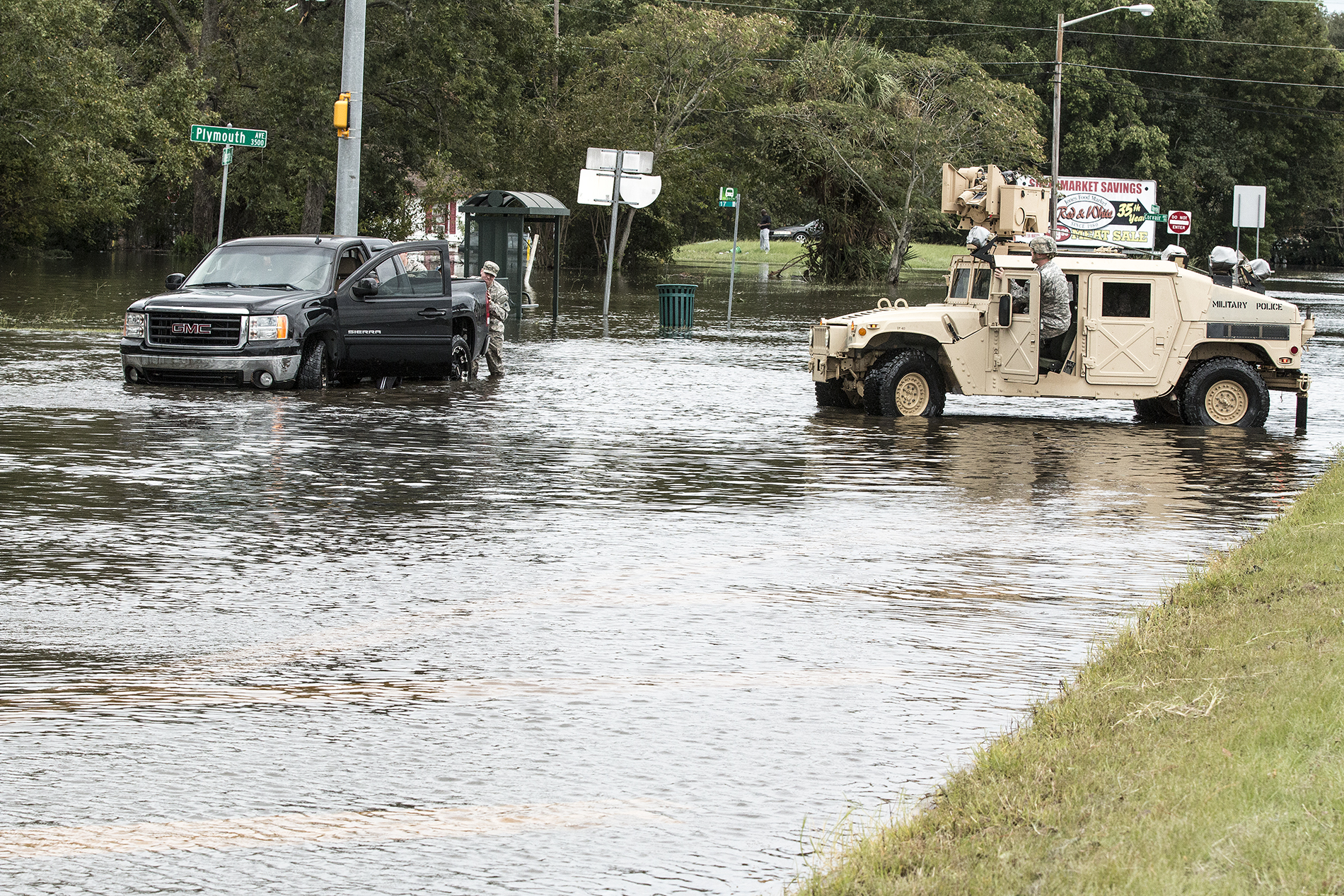
Flooded road, Hurricane Matthew, 2016

Climate change will also cause more severe flooding, droughts, and heavy rainstorms in Georgia. Warmer temperatures will evaporate water faster, leading to dryer conditions and a diminishing supply of available water. Soil in non-coastal areas will become dryer. These conditions are likely to affect farmlands.

Rising temperatures will cause water levels to decrease in the Chattahoochee and other major rivers, as well as Lake Lanier and other reservoirs, which will affect the water supply of Atlanta and other cities.

== Economic and social impacts ==
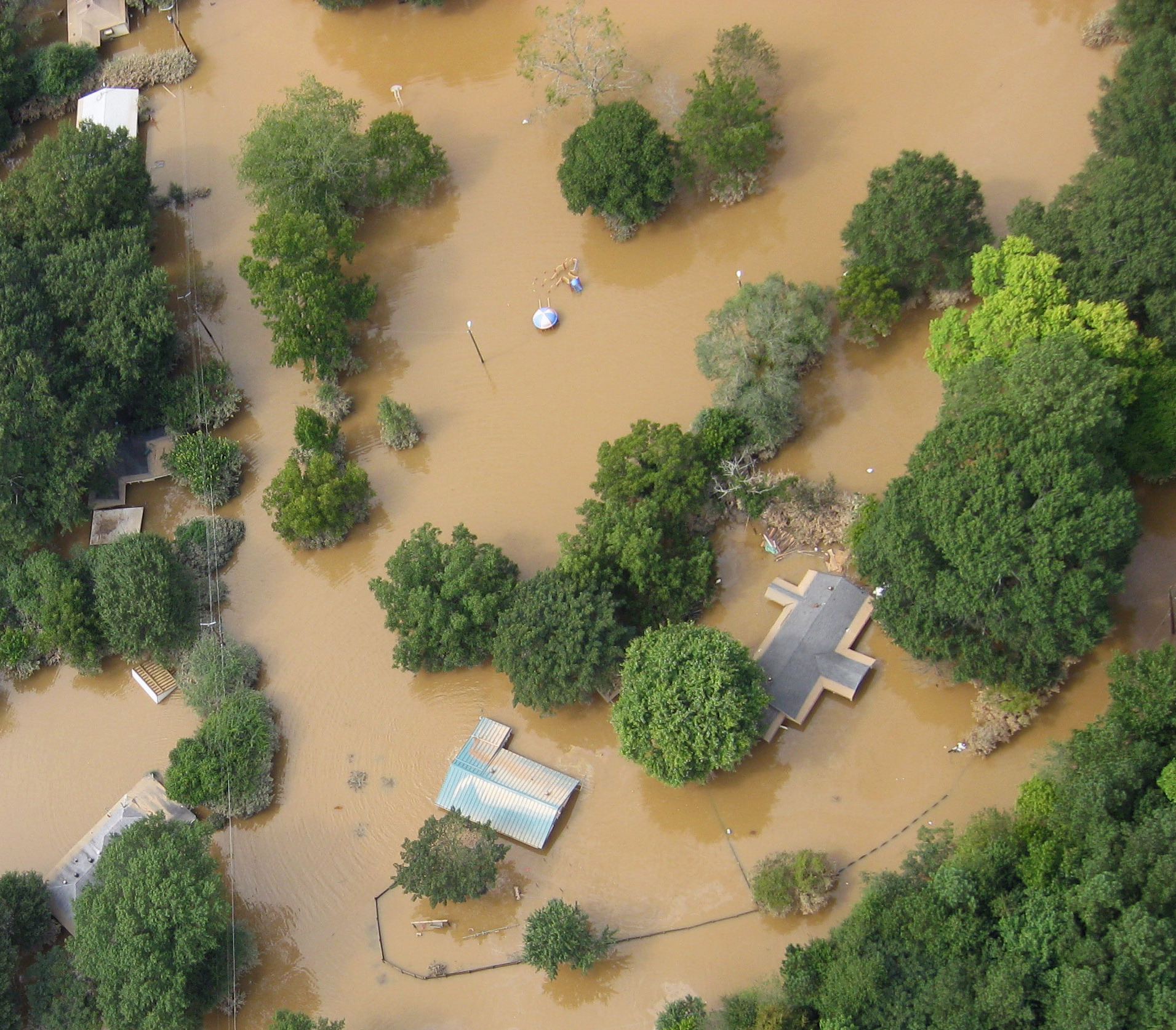
Flooded homes in Central Georgia, 2009 floods.

=== Agriculture and forest resources ===
According to the EPA "Changing the climate will have both harmful and beneficial effects on farming. Although hotter temperatures alone would tend to depress crop yields, higher concentrations of atmospheric carbon dioxide increase yields, and that fertilizing effect is likely to offset the harmful effects of heat on cotton, peanuts, soybeans, and wheat—if adequate water is available. More severe droughts, however, could cause crop failures. Higher temperatures are likely to reduce livestock productivity, because heat stress disrupts the animals' metabolism."

According to the EPA "Warmer temperatures and changes in rainfall are unlikely to substantially reduce forest cover in Georgia, although the composition of trees in the forests may change. More droughts would reduce forest productivity, and climate change is also likely to increase the damage from insects and disease. But longer growing seasons and increased carbon dioxide concentrations could more than offset the losses from those factors. Forests cover about half of the state, with oak-pine forests common in the north, loblolly-shortleaf pine forests common in the center, and longleaf-slash pine forests common in the south. Changing the climate may enable oak-pine forests to become the most common forest type throughout the state."

=== Coastal storms, homes, and infrastructure ===
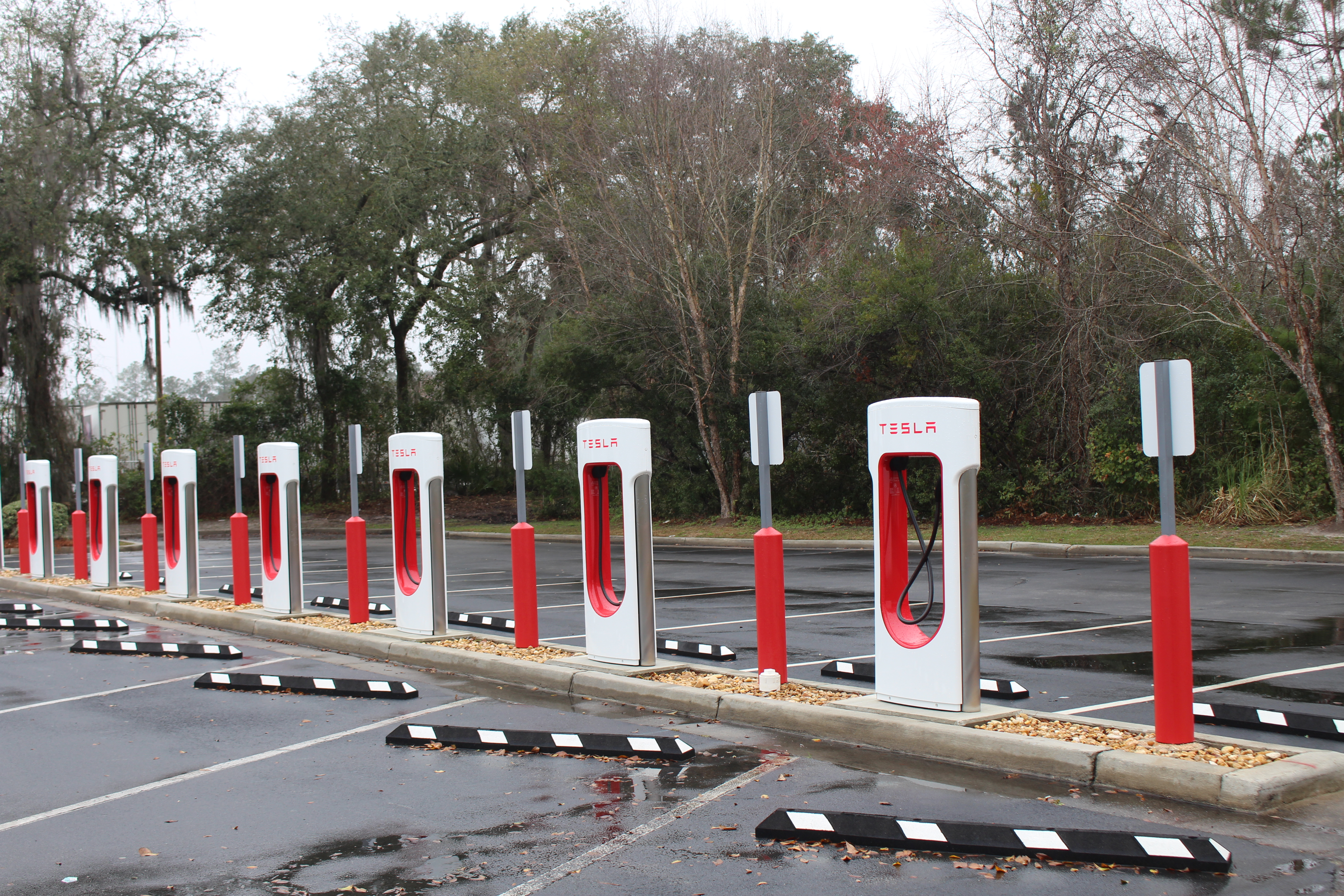
Tesla Superchargers, Valdosta

According to the EPA "Tropical storms and hurricanes have become more intense during the past 20 years. Although warming oceans provide energy, scientists are not sure whether the recent intensification reflects a long-term trend. Nevertheless, hurricane wind speeds and rainfall rates are likely to increase as the climate continues to warm."

According to the EPA "Whether or not storms become more intense, coastal homes and infrastructure will flood more often as sea level rises, because storm surges will become higher as well. Rising sea level is likely to increase flood insurance rates, while more frequent storms could increase the deductible for wind damage in homeowner insurance policies. Parts of Savannah and Brunswick are vulnerable to coastal flooding, which is likely to become more severe as sea level rises."

== See also ==
- List of U.S. states and territories by carbon dioxide emissions
- Plug-in electric vehicles in Georgia (U.S. state)
