= Dolvin =

Dolvin is a surname found in the United States. Notable people with this name include:

- Emily Dolvin (1912–2006), American educator and activist
- Welborn G. Dolvin (1916–1991), American lieutenant general

== See also ==
- Dolfin (disambiguation)
