= List of presidential trips made by Jimmy Carter (1980–81) =

Wikimedia list article

This is a list of presidential trips made by Jimmy Carter during 1980, the fourth and final year of his presidency as the 39th president of the United States. International trips are highlighted in blue.

This list excludes trips made within Washington, D.C., the U.S. federal capital in which the White House, the official residence and principal workplace of the president, is located. It also excludes the capital's immediate surroundings in Maryland and Virginia, such as Andrews Air Force Base in Maryland, where the president typically boards Air Force One for all trips outside the area. Also excluded are trips to Camp David, the country residence of the president, and to Carter's house in Plains, Georgia.

== January–March 1980 ==
No trips made

== April ==
State or country	Areas visited	Dates	Details
Texas	San Antonio	April 28	Visited servicemembers who were injured in Operation Eagle Claw who were recovering at Wilford Hall Medical Center and Brooke Army Medical Center.

== May ==
State or country	Areas visited	Dates	Details
Pennsylvania	Philadelphia	May 9	Addressed the World Affairs Council of Philadelphia at the Fairmont Hotel. Held a townhall meeting at Temple University.
Washington	Kelso	May 22	Toured a relief shelter at Cascade Middle School.
Oregon	Portland	May 22	Held a press conference at the Portland Marriott Downtown Waterfront after touring the damage caused by the eruption of Mount St. Helens by helicopter.
Washington	Spokane	May 22	Held a press conference at Spokane International Airport.
Virginia	Norfolk	May 26	Visited the USS Nimitz as it returned from Iran. Met with family members of the Nimitz's crew at the Norfolk Naval Shipyard.
Ohio	Columbus, Parma, Cleveland	May 29	Campaign rally at Nationwide Plaza, followed by a fundraiser at the Sheraton Columbus. Addressed seniors at Parma City Hall. Visited the home of James Oakar, the brother of Representative Mary Rose Oakar, in Parma. Rested at the Bond Court Hotel. Spoke at the Olivet Institutional Baptist Church in Cleveland. Held a campaign fundraiser at the Cleveland Plaza Hotel.

== June ==
State or country	Areas visited	Dates	Details
Indiana	Fort Wayne	June 1	Visited Vernon Jordan, who had been the target of an assassination attempt three days earlier, as he recovered at Parkview Memorial Hospital. This visit was the first event covered by CNN, which launched the same day.
Florida	Miami Beach	June 9	Addressed the Opportunities Industrialization Centers convention at the Fontainebleau Miami Beach. Met with local leaders at the James E. Scott Center.
Washington	Seattle	June 9–10	Addressed the United States Conference of Mayors at the Olympic Hotel.
Nebraska	Grand Island	June 10	Toured damage caused by the 1980 Grand Island tornado outbreak one week earlier. Held a press conference at the local YMCA center.
Italy	Rome, Venice	June 19–24	Attended the 6th G7 summit. State visit. Met with President Sandro Pertini.
Vatican City	Apostolic Palace	June 21	Audience with Pope John Paul II.
Yugoslavia	Belgrade	June 24–25	Official visit. Met with President Cvijetin Mijatović.
Spain	Madrid	June 25–26	Official visit. Met with King Juan Carlos I and Prime Minister Adolfo Suárez.
Portugal	Lisbon	June 26–30	Official visit. Met with President António Ramalho Eanes and Prime Minister Francisco de Sá Carneiro.

== July ==
State or country	Areas visited	Dates	Details
California	Los Angeles, Oakland, Portola Valley, Modesto, Merced	July 3–4	Addressed the National Education Association convention at the Los Angeles Convention Center. Addressed local leaders at Goodman Hall in Jack London Square. Attended a Democratic fundraiser at Walter Shorenstein's home in Portola Valley. Stayed at the home of Oakland mayor Lionel Wilson. Held a townhall meeting at Merced Community College. Attended a Democratic fundraiser at the home of Frank C. Damrell Jr. in Merced.
Florida	Miami	July 4	Addressed the National Association for the Advancement of Colored People convention at the Fontainebleau Miami Beach.
Michigan	Detroit	July 8	Met with representatives of the automobile industry at Detroit Metropolitan Airport.
Alaska	Anchorage	July 8	Stopover at Elmendorf Air Force Base on the way to Japan.
Japan	Tokyo	July 9–10	Official visit. Attended memorial services for former Prime Minister Masayoshi Ōhira. Met with Emperor Hirohito, Bangla president Ziaur Rahman, Australian prime minister Malcolm Fraser, Thai prime minister Prem Tinsulanonda and Chinese premier Hua Guofeng.
Alaska	Anchorage, Matanuska-Susitna Borough	July 9–10	Stopover at Elmendorf Air Force Base on the way home from Japan, staying overnight at the Vice Commander's residence. Went fishing with Secretary of State Edmund Muskie on Clarence Lake.
Georgia	Sapelo Island, Towns County	July 11–17	Summer vacation. Boarded a Georgia Department of Natural Resources research vessel, the R/V George T. Bagby. Went fishing on the farm of Don Carter (no relation to the president) near Hiawassee.
Florida	Jacksonville, Hollywood	July 17	Spoke at the Daniel State Office Building auditorium. Attended a Democratic fundraiser at the Independent Life Building. Addressed the International Transport Workers' Federation congress at the Diplomat Resort & Spa Hollywood, where he also attended a Democratic fundraiser.
Kentucky	Henderson	July 21	Attended a Democratic fundraiser at a private residence.
Texas	Justin, Dallas	July 21	Toured a farm in Justin that had been damaged by an ongoing drought. Attended Democratic fundraisers at Dallas Union Station and at a private residence in Dallas.

== August ==
State or country	Areas visited	Dates	Details
New York	New York	August 6	Addressed the National Urban League convention at the New York Hilton. Visited Vernon Jordan at New York Hospital-Cornell Medical Center.
New York	New York	August 13–15	Stayed at Sheraton Centre Hotel & Towers. Attended the 1980 Democratic National Convention, accepting its re-nomination in a speech at Madison Square Garden, and visiting associated fundraisers at the Plaza Hotel and the New York Statler. Toured an exhibition of the works of Pablo Picasso at the Museum of Modern Art.
Massachusetts	Boston	August 21	Addressed the American Legion convention at the John B. Hynes Memorial Auditorium. Interviewed by the editorial board of the Boston Globe at the Sheraton hotel.
Michigan	Detroit	August 22	Addressed the American Federation of Teachers conference at the Renaissance Center Plaza Hotel.

== September ==
State or country	Areas visited	Dates	Details
Alabama	Muscle Shoals, Tuscumbia	September 1	Attended a Democratic fundraiser at Mrs. C's Restaurant in Muscle Shoals. Attended the Tri-Cities Central Labor Council Annual Labor Day Picnic at Spring Park in Tuscumbia.
Missouri	Independence	September 2	Visited former First Lady Bess Truman at her home. Held a townhall meeting at Truman High School. Toured the Harry S. Truman Presidential Library and Museum.
Pennsylvania	Philadelphia	September 3	Toured the South Philadelphia Community Center. Visited the Italian Market. Went to Mickey Cavanaugh's Restaurant and Bar with Mayor William J. Green III. Spoke at Zion Baptist Church. Interviewed at WPVI-TV studios.
New Jersey	Perth Amboy	September 9	Dedicated a new steel mill for the Raritan River Steel Company. Spoke at Olive Street Community Center.
Texas	Corpus Christi, Houston	September 15	Spoke at Foy H. Moody High School. Attended a Democratic fundraiser at the Hyatt Regency Houston Downtown.
Georgia	Alpharetta, Roswell, Atlanta	September 15–16	Dedicated the new Dolvin Elementary School in Alpharetta, named for Carter's uncle William J. Dolvin. Visited his "Aunt Sissy", Emily Dolvin, at her home in Roswell. Attended a Democratic fundraiser at the home of Charles Kirbo. Stayed at the Georgia Governor's Mansion. Met with Southern Black leaders at Ebenezer Baptist Church, Southern Christian Leadership Conference headquarters, and the Atlanta Life building. Dedicated the new midfield terminal building at Hartsfield Atlanta International Airport.
South Carolina	Startex, Lyman	September 16	Toured the Startex textile mill. Attended a barbecue for Carter–Mondale campaign workers at Lyman Town Hall. Attended a Democratic fundraiser at the home of J. Verne Smith.
Ohio	Cleveland	September 16	Attended Democratic fundraisers at Kiefer's Restaurant and at the home of Carter's former ambassador to Austria Milton A. Wolf.
Illinois	Rosemont, Niles	September 20	Met with state leaders at Heuer's Restaurant in Rosemont. Addressed the Polish National Alliance 100th Anniversary dinner at Przybylo's White Eagle in Niles.
Illinois	Springfield	September 22	Spoke at Lincoln Land Community College.
California	Torrance, Los Angeles, Beverly Hills, San Jose	September 22–23	Held a townhall meeting at North High School. Addressed the California State AFL-CIO Convention at the Los Angeles Convention Center. Attended a Democratic fundraiser at The Beverly Hilton. Stayed at the Century Plaza Hotel. Toured an exhibit on alternative energy sources at San Jose City Hall.
Oregon	Portland	September 23	Toured a new energy-efficient housing complex in the Buckman neighborhood. Attended a Democratic fundraiser at a private residence.
Washington	Tacoma	September 23	Toured the Continental Grain Company terminal at the Port of Tacoma. Visited a local Carter–Mondale campaign office and the Beacon Senior Center. Attended a Democratic fundraiser at the Tacoma Bicentennial Pavilion.
New York	New York	September 29	Toured the Metzger Garment Factory. Addressed the International Ladies Garment Workers Union convention at the Sheraton Centre Hotel & Towers, where he also addressed the New York Business/Labor Committee for Carter/Mondale.

== October ==
State or country	Areas visited	Dates	Details
Michigan	Wayne, Flint	October 1	Toured the Michigan Assembly Plant. Held a townhall meeting at Flint Northern High School.
New York	Niagara Falls	October 1	Signed legislation for the federal government to clean up waste at the West Valley Demonstration Project and Love Canal sites in a ceremony at the Niagara Falls Convention and Civic Center, where he also addressed the Civil Service Employees Association convention.
Ohio	Dayton	October 2	Held a townhall meeting at the Dayton Convention Center.
Pennsylvania	Lansdowne, Philadelphia	October 2	Met with Lansdowne residents in the backyard of a local teacher, Joseph Phillips. Attended a Democratic fundraiser at the Fairmont Hotel.
Virginia	Sterling	October 3	Signed legislation amending the Higher Education Act of 1965 in a ceremony at the Northern Virginia Community College Loudoun Campus.
Georgia	Americus	October 3	Visited his mother, Lillian Gordy Carter, at Sumter County Hospital after she broke her hip.
Wisconsin	West Allis	October 6	Toured the Milwaukee Area Technical College West Allis Campus.
Illinois	Addison, Chicago	October 6	Visited the home of Democratic delegate Hubert J. Loftus in Addison. Spoke at a voter registration rally in Daley Plaza. Attended a Democratic fundraiser at the Palmer House Hotel.
Tennessee	Blountville, Nashville	October 9	Attended a Democratic fundraiser at the Old Deery Inn. Held a townhall meeting at the Grand Ole Opry House, and a campaign fundraiser at the Opryland Hotel.
North Carolina	Winston-Salem, Clemmons	October 9	Signed legislation establishing March 19 as National Agriculture Day at the Dixie Classic Fairgrounds. Attended a campaign fundraiser at Tanglewood Park.
Florida	Tallahassee, St. Petersburg	October 9–10	Attended a Democratic fundraiser at the North Florida Fairgrounds. Stayed at the Florida Governor's Mansion. Signed the Refugee Education Assistance Act into law in a ceremony at the Florida State Capitol. Held a townhall meeting with local seniors at the Princess Martha Hotel in St. Petersburg. Visited John Pennington, the reporter who exposed fraud in the 1962 Georgia State Senate election and allowed Carter to start his political career, at Bayfront Memorial Hospital.
New York	New York	October 13	Met with local leaders at Forest Hills Jewish Community Center. Signed legislation proclaiming an Italian American Heritage Week in a ceremony at the New York Public Library Main Branch. Appeared in the Columbus Day Parade.
Illinois	West Frankfort, Marion	October 13	Toured Old Ben Coal Mine No. 25 in West Frankfort. Attended a reception for Carter–Mondale campaign workers at Ban Dor Motor Inn in Marion.
Missouri	St. Louis	October 13	Held a townhall meeting at the University of Missouri–St. Louis's Mark Twain Gymnasium.
Massachusetts	Boston	October 15	Met with local seniors at the Christopher Columbus Community Center. Attended a Democratic fundraiser at Anthony's Pier 4.
Pennsylvania	Yatesville	October 15	Held a townhall meeting at Pittston Area High School.
New Jersey	Lyndhurst, Secaucus	October 15	Held a townhall meeting at the Lyndhurst Fire Department. Attended a Democratic fundraiser at the Meadowlands Hilton in Secaucus.
Connecticut	Newington, Hartford, Windsor Locks	October 16	Toured Newington Children's Hospital. Met with state and local leaders at the Old State House.
New York	Hempstead, New York	October 16	Held a townhall meeting at Hofstra University. Addressed a gathering of state labor leaders at the Sheraton Centre Hotel & Towers. Attended the Alfred E. Smith Memorial Foundation Dinner at the Waldorf Astoria New York.
Pennsylvania	Beaver Falls	October 20	Spoke at the Carnegie Free Library of Beaver Falls.
Ohio	Youngstown	October 20	Answered call-in questions at WFMJ-TV studios.
New York	New York	October 20	Met with local leaders at the Concord Baptist Church of Christ in Bedford–Stuyvesant, Brooklyn. Attended an Asian Pacific American Committee fundraiser at the Silver Palace Restaurant. Attended a Democratic fundraiser at the Sheraton Centre Hotel & Towers.
Florida	Miami, Orlando	October 21	Held a townhall meeting at Miami Edison Senior High School. Attended a Dade County Democratic reception at the Sheraton River House in Miami. Attended a Democratic Victory Fund reception at the Turkey Lake Park Ecology Center in Orlando.
Louisiana	New Orleans	October 21	Held a campaign rally in Jackson Square. Attended a Democratic fundraiser at the Fairmont New Orleans, where he stayed overnight.
Texas	Beaumont, Waco	October 22	Toured Bethlehem Beaumont Shipyard. Held a campaign rally at James Connally Airfield. Gave television and radio interviews from the Texas State Technical Institute Instructional Media Technology Building.
Arkansas/Texas	Texarkana	October 22	Held a campaign rally on the steps of the Texarkana Post Office and Courthouse, straddling the Arkansas–Texas border. Carter spoke alongside Arkansas governor and future president Bill Clinton.
New Jersey	Gloucester City	October 24	Met with local residents at the Knights of Columbus Hall.
Michigan	Wyoming, Grand Rapids	October 24	Campaigned for Dale Sprik for Congress at the Wyoming Public Library and at the International Laborers Union Hall in Grand Rapids. Stayed at the Airport Hilton.
Ohio	Toledo, Waterville Township	October 25	Held a townhall meeting at Start High School. Spoke to farmers while visiting a family farm in Waterville Township.
West Virginia	Wayne County	October 27	Held a campaign rally at Tri-State Airport.
Ohio	Cleveland	October 27–29	Stayed at the Bond Court Hotel. Participated in the second presidential debate against former California governor Ronald Reagan at Music Hall.
Pennsylvania	Pittsburgh	October 29	Held a townhall meeting at Trinity Cathedral.
New York	Rochester	October 29	Held a campaign rally at John F. Kennedy Plaza.
New Jersey	Newark	October 29	Spoke at Bethany Baptist Church. Attended a Democratic fundraiser at Robert Treat Hotel.
Pennsylvania	Philadelphia	October 29–30	Stayed at the Fairmont Hotel. Met with local Polish Americans at the Pilsudski Club, and Jewish community leaders at the Young Men's and Young Women's Hebrew Association.
New York	New York	October 30	Spoke at an International Ladies Garment Workers Union rally on a street corner in the Garment District.
Michigan	Saginaw	October 30	Held a campaign rally at Saginaw Valley State College.
Missouri	St. Louis	October 30	Held a campaign rally at Northwest Plaza.
South Carolina	Columbia	October 30–31	Stayed at the South Carolina Governor's Mansion. Held a townhall meeting at the Columbia Township Auditorium.
Florida	Lakeland	October 31	Held a campaign rally at Lakeland Civic Center.
Tennessee	Memphis	October 31	Held a townhall meeting in the Federal Express hangar no. 6 at Memphis International Airport.
Mississippi	Jackson	October 31	Attended a Democratic Victory Rally at the Mississippi Governor's Mansion.
Texas	Houston, Brownsville, San Antonio, Abilene, Fort Worth	October 31–November 1	Held a campaign rally at Miller Outdoor Theatre. Stayed at the Warwick Hotel. Held campaign rallies at Texas Southmost College, the Alamo, Abilene Municipal Airport, and the Fort Worth Stockyards.

== November ==
State or country	Areas visited	Dates	Details
Wisconsin	Milwaukee	November 1	Held a campaign rally at the Red Carpet Inn.
Illinois	Chicago	November 1–2	Stayed at the Hyatt Regency Chicago, where he attended the National Italian American Sports Hall of Fame dinner.
Ohio	Akron	November 3	Held a campaign rally at Akron–Canton Airport.
Illinois	Granite City, East St. Louis	November 3	Held campaign rallies at Granite City South High School and on a street corner in East St. Louis.
Missouri	Springfield	November 3	Held a campaign rally at Springfield Regional Airport.
Michigan	Detroit	November 3	Held a campaign rally at Detroit Metropolitan Airport.
Oregon	Portland	November 3	Held a campaign rally at Portland International Airport.
Washington	Seattle	November 3	Held a campaign rally at Boeing Field.

== December 1980–January 1981 ==
No trips made
