= History of Georgia =

History of Georgia may refer to:

- History of Georgia (country)
- History of Georgia (U.S. state)
