= List of historical societies in Georgia (U.S. state) =

The following is a list of historical societies in the state of Georgia, United States.

== Organizations ==
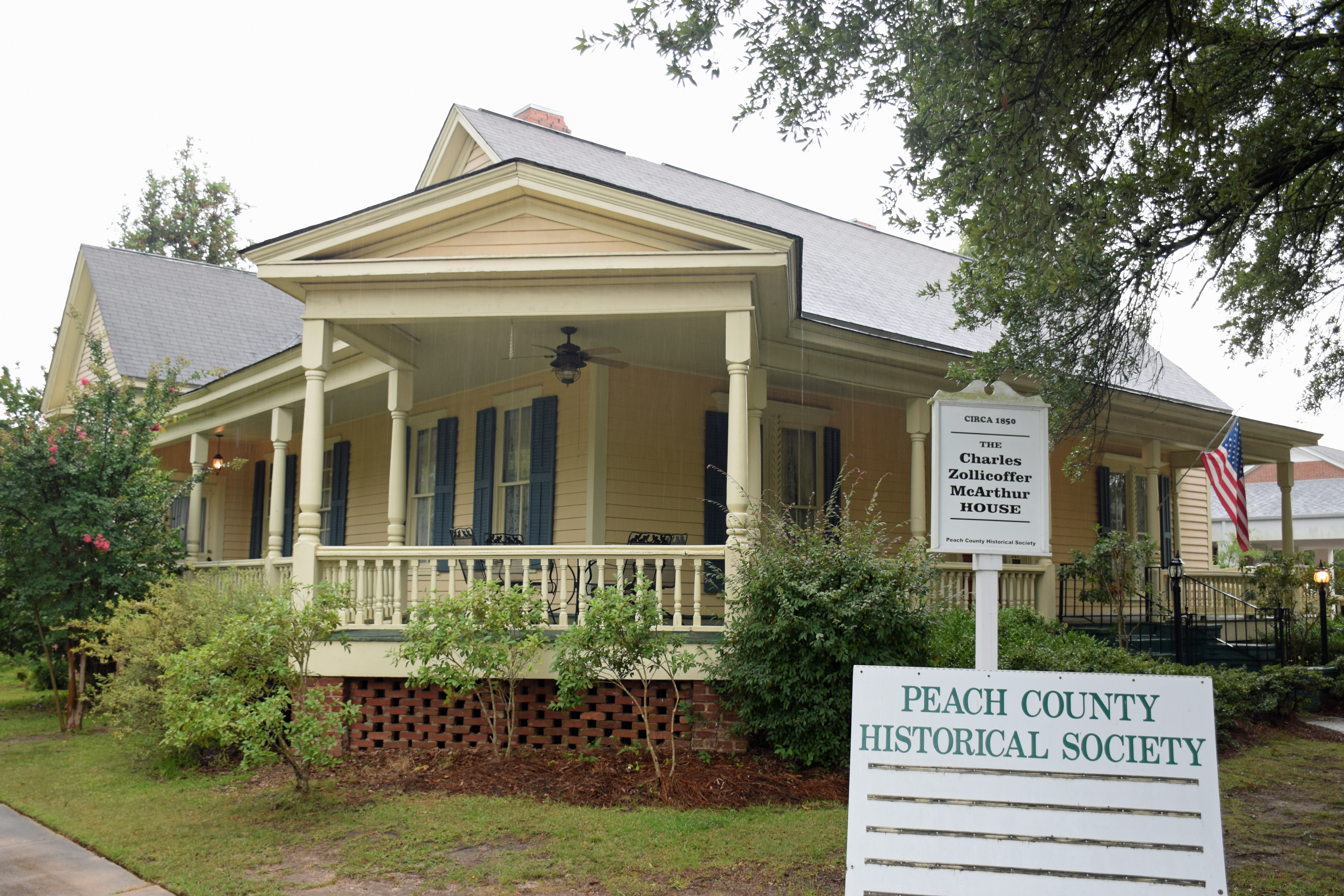
Peach County Historical Society building in Fort Valley, Georgia, US (photo 2015)

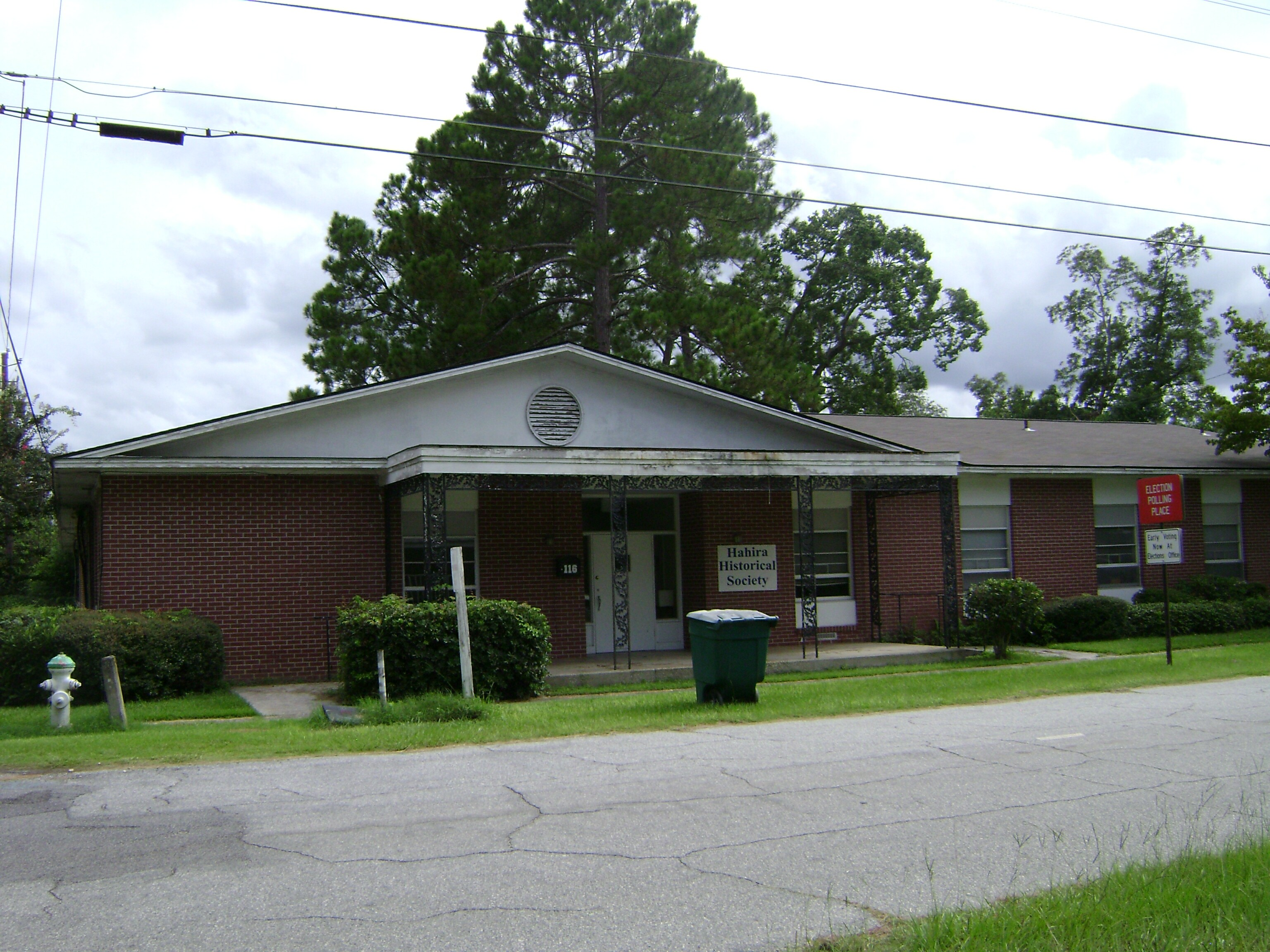
Hahira Historical Society building in the state of Georgia, US (photo 2012)

- Alpharetta and Old Milton County Historical Society
- Athens Clarke Heritage Foundation
- Athens Historical Society
- Atlanta Historical Society
- Augusta Richmond County Historical Society
- Austell Historical Preservation Society
- Banks County Historical Society
- Barnesville-Lamar County Historical Society
- Bowdon Area Historical Society
- Brantley Historical Society
- Carroll County Historical Society, Georgia
- Charlton County Historical Society
- Cherokee County Historical Society
- Chipley Historical Center of Pine Mountain
- Coastal Georgia Historical Society
- Cobb County Historical Society
- Cook County Historical Society
- Decatur County Historical Society
- DeKalb History Center (formerly DeKalb Historical Society)
- Elbert County Historical Society
- Fayette County Historical Society
- Historical Society of Forsyth County
- Georgia Historical Society
- Gwinnett Historical Society
- Habersham County Historical Society
- Hahira Historical Society
- Hall County Black Historical Society
- Hancock County Historical Society
- Hapeville Historical Society
- Haralson County Historical Society
- Hart County Historical Society
- Heard County Historical Society
- Jackson County Historical Society
- Jefferson County Historical Society
- Lake Park Area Historical Society
- Laurens County Historical Society
- Liberty County Historical Society
- Lower Altamaha County Historical Society
- Lowndes County Historical Society
- Macon County Historical Society
- Middle Georgia Historical Society
- Paulding County Historical Society
- Peach County Historical Society
- Pickens Historical Society
- Polk County Historical Society
- Rabun County Historical Society
- Roopville Archive and Historical Society
- Roswell Historical Society
- Richmond County Historical Society
- Sandy Springs Historic Community Foundation
- Savannah Historical Research Association
- Smyrna Historical and Genealogical Society
- Thomas County Historical Society
- Towns County Historical Society
- Troup County Historical Society
- Union County Historical Society
- Washington County Historical Society

== See also ==
- History of Georgia (U.S. state)
- List of museums in Georgia (U.S. state)
- National Register of Historic Places listings in Georgia (U.S. state)
- List of historical societies in the United States
