= Roswell Historical Society =

The Roswell Historical Society is a non-profit organization and was established to preserve the history of Roswell, Georgia, US, through preservation of historically significant documents and landmarks.

The organization was founded on October 28, 1971, with Emily Dolvin as its initial chairperson. An affiliate chapter of the Georgia Historical Society, the organization maintains and staffs a research library and archive located in the Roswell Cultural Arts Center, offers a guided tour of the Roswell Historic District, records oral histories from local residents, and places and maintains historical markers at local sites of interest.

== See also ==
- List of historical societies in Georgia (U.S. state)
