= History of Georgia (U.S. state) =

The history of Georgia in the United States of America spans pre-Columbian time to the present-day U.S. state of Georgia. The area was inhabited by Aboriginal tribes for thousands of years. A modest Spanish presence was established in the late 16th century, mostly centered on Catholic missions. The Spanish had largely withdrawn from the territory by the early 18th century, although they had settlements in nearby Florida. They had little influence historically in what would become Georgia. (Most Spanish place names in Georgia date from the 19th century, not from the age of colonization.)

Georgia was founded by James Oglethorpe in 1732. Oglethorpe envisioned the new colony as a refuge for the debtors who crowded London prisons; however, no such prisoners were among the initial settlers. Military concerns were a far more motivating force for the British government, which wanted Georgia (named for King George II) as a buffer zone to protect South Carolina and its other southern colonies against incursions from Florida by the Spanish, Britain’s greatest rival for North American territory. As a result, a series of fortifications was built along the coast, and on several occasions, most notably the Battle of Bloody Marsh on St. Simons Island, British troops that were commanded and financed by Oglethorpe kept the Spanish at bay.

European Americans began to settle in Georgia, although it was territory of both the Creek and the Cherokee nations. They pressured state and the federal government to remove the Indians. After Indian Removal in the 1830s, under President Andrew Jackson, the pace of settlement by European Americans increased rapidly. The new cotton gin, invented at the end of the 18th century, enabled the profitable processing of short-staple cotton, which could now be grown in the inland and upcountry regions. This change stimulated the cotton boom in Georgia and much of the Deep South, resulting in cotton being a main economic driver, cultivated on slave labor. Based on enslaved labor, predominantly enslaved black Africans, planters cleared and developed large cotton plantations. Many became immensely wealthy, but most of the yeomen whites did not own slaves and worked family subsistence farms.

On January 19, 1861, Georgia seceded from the Union and on February 8, 1861, joined other Southern states, all slave societies, to form the Confederate States of America. Georgia contributed nearly one hundred twenty thousand soldiers to the Confederacy, with about five thousand Georgians (both black and white) joining the Union Army. The first major battle in the state was the Battle of Chickamauga, a Confederate victory, and the last major Confederate victory in the west. In 1864, Union General William Tecumseh Sherman's armies invaded Georgia as part of the Atlanta campaign. The burning of Atlanta (which was a commercially vital railroad hub but not yet the state capital— which was, at the time, Milledgeville) was followed by Sherman's March to the Sea, which laid waste to a wide swath of the state from Atlanta to Savannah in late 1864. These events became iconic in the state's memory and dealt a devastating economic blow to the entire Confederacy.

After the war, Georgians endured a period of economic hardship. Reconstruction was a period of military occupation. With enfranchisement of freedmen, who allied with the Republican Party, a biracial legislature was elected. It established public education and welfare institutions for the first time in the state, and initiated economic programs. Reconstruction ended in 1875 after white Democrats regained political control of the state, through violence and intimidation at elections. They passed new laws and constitutional amendments that disenfranchised blacks and many poor whites near the turn of the century. In the Jim Crow era from the late 19th century to 1964, blacks were suppressed as second-class citizens, nearly excluded from politics. Thousands of blacks migrated North to escape these conditions and associated violence. The state was predominately rural, with an agricultural economy based on cotton into the 20th century. All residents of the state suffered in the Great Depression of the 1930s.

The many training bases and munitions plants established in World War II stimulated the economy, and provided some new opportunities for blacks. During the broad-based activism of the Civil rights movement in the 1950s and 1960s, Atlanta, Georgia was the base of African-American leader, minister Martin Luther King Jr. The state integrated public facilities. After 1950 the economy grew and became more diverse, with cotton receding in importance. Atlanta became a major regional city and transportation hub, expanding into neighboring communities through its fast-growing suburbs. Politically, Georgia was part of the Solid South until 1964, when it first voted for a Republican candidate for president. Democratic candidates continued to receive majority-white support in state and local elections until the 1990s, when the realignment of conservative whites shifted to the Republican Party. Atlanta was the host of the 1996 Summer Olympics, which marked the 100th anniversary of the modern Olympic Games. Georgia would grow rapidly both population wise and economically in the late 20th to early 21st century. In 2014, Georgia's population topped 10 million people, and was the fourth fastest growing U.S. state from 2013 to 2014.

== Pre-colonial era ==
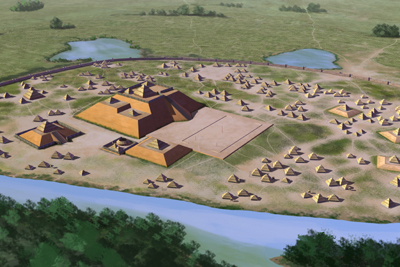
Etowah Indian Mounds in Bartow County, example of South Appalachian Mississippian culture

Before European contact, Native American cultures are divided under archaeological criteria into four lengthy periods of culture: Paleo, Archaic, Woodland, and Mississippian. Their cultures and polities are identified by characteristics of artifacts and other archaeological evidence, including earthwork mounds that survive to the present and are visible aboveground.

The human occupation of Georgia can be dated to at least 13,250 years ago. This was one of the most dramatic periods of climate change in recent earth history, toward the end of the Ice Age, in the Late Pleistocene epoch. Sea levels were more than 200 feet (61 m) lower than present levels. The Atlantic Ocean shoreline was 100 or more miles seaward of its current boundary. A 2003 research project undertaken by University of Georgia researchers Ervan G. Garrison, Sherri L. Littman, and Megan Mitchell, looked at and reported on fossils and artefacts associated with Gray's Reef National Marine Sanctuary, which is located more than 19 miles (31 km) beyond today's shoreline, and 60 to 70 feet (21 m) (18 to 21 m) below the Atlantic Ocean. As recently as 8,000 years ago, Gray's Reef was dry ground, attached to the mainland. The researchers uncovered artefacts from a period of occupation by Clovis culture and Paleoindian hunters dating back more than 10,000 years. A 2005 study published by Texas A&M University suggested that Burke County may also have been a major center of Clovis culture. It possesses a particularly high number of Clovis and Dalton points, likely due to the large areas of exposed chert for making stone tools. In general, most Paleoindian projectile points in the state were found in a large strip of land running from southwest to northeast, crossing both the Piedmont and the Atlantic Plain.

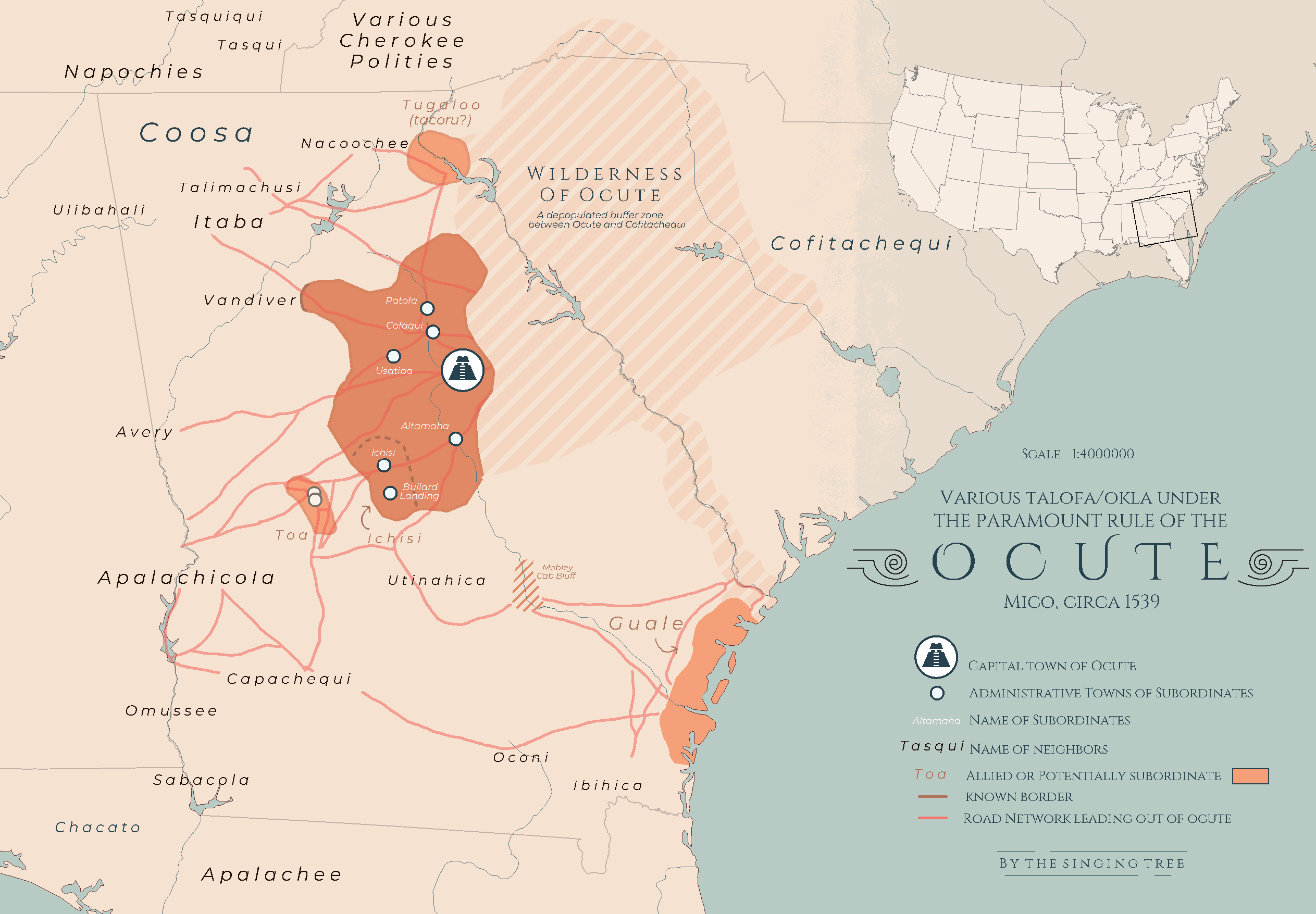
Reconstruction of the mid-16th century Ocute polity and surrounding regions.

The South Appalachian Mississippian culture, one of many mound building Native American cultures, lasted from 800 to 1500 AD. This culture developed urban societies distinguished by their construction of truncated earthworks pyramids, or platform mounds built by polities such as Coosa and Ocute; intensive village-based maize horticulture, which enabled the development of more dense populations; and creation of ornate copper, shell and mica paraphernalia adorned with a series of motifs known as the Southeastern Ceremonial Complex (SECC). The largest sites surviving in present-day Georgia are Kolomoki in Early County, Etowah in Bartow County, Nacoochee Mound in White County, and Ocmulgee National Monument in Macon.

During the Late Mississippian Period, Coastal Georgia was dominated by the paramountcy called Guale who would join the Yamasee who in turn joined the Muscogee and Seminole confederacies. Central Georgia was dominated by a powerful polity called Ocute. Ocute formed the center of an anti Cofitachequi alliance possibly including the Guale. The warfare between the two was so violent it led to the formation of the Desert of Ocute, a large fertile region with few to no inhabitants. In the northeast was the powerful polity of Coosa who dominated southern Appalachia. These large polities were encountered by Hernando De Soto during his expedition through what is now the American South. During the middle 1600s, Iroquoian speaking slave raiders called Westo responding to European economic demands caused mass depopulation in the region. This power vacuum allowed the rise of the Muscogee Confederacy as the survivors consolidated in what would become four mother towns of the Confederacy. Appalachian Georgia meanwhile became governed by Cherokee.

== European exploration ==
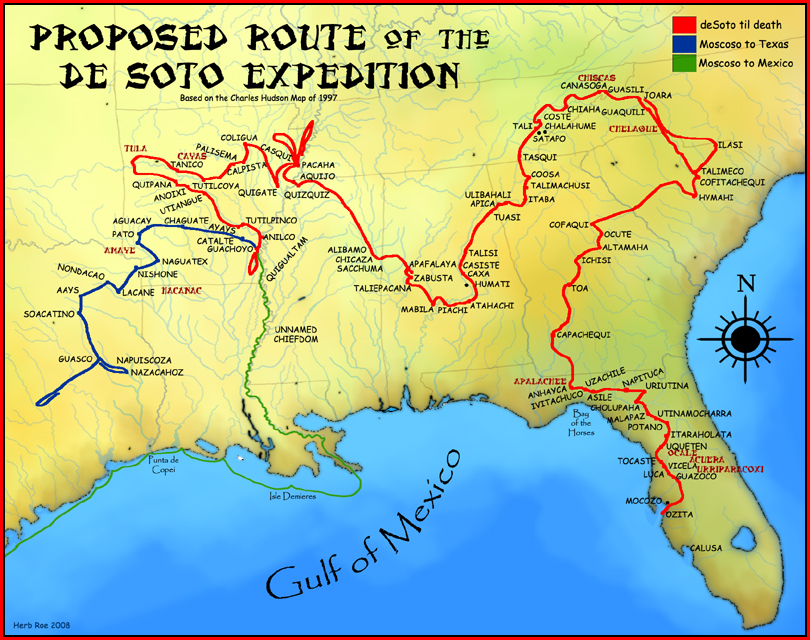
A proposed route for the de Soto Expedition, based on Charles M. Hudson map of 1997

At the time of European colonization of the Americas, the historic Iroquoian-speaking Cherokee and Muskogean-speaking Yamasee and Hitchiti peoples lived throughout Georgia.

The coastal regions were occupied by groups of small, Muskogean-speaking tribes with a loosely shared heritage, consisting mostly of the Guale-associated groups to the east and the Timucua group to the south. This group of 35 tribes had lands that extended into central Florida; they were bordered by the Hitchiti and their territory to the west.

The Muskogean peoples were related by language to the three large Muskogean nations that occupied territories between the Mississippi River and the Cherokee: the Choctaw, Chickasaw, and Coushatta. There were also a few other small Muskogean tribes along the Florida-Alabama Gulf Coast region. Archaeology shows that these historic peoples were in this region, at the very least, from the 12th century to colonial times. The name for Appalachia came from the Timucuan language, and a specific group from northern Florida called the Apalachee.

Spanish explorer Juan Ponce de León may have sailed along the coast during his exploration of Florida. In 1526, Lucas Vázquez de Ayllón attempted to establish a colony on an island, possibly near St. Catherines Island. At San Miguel de Gualdape, the first Catholic Mass took place in the boundaries of what are today the United States.

From 1539 to 1542 Hernando de Soto, a Spanish conquistador, led the first European expedition deep into the territory of the modern-day southern United States, searching for gold and a passage to China. A vast undertaking, de Soto's North American expedition ranged across parts of the modern states of Florida, South Carolina, North Carolina, Alabama, Mississippi, Arkansas, Louisiana, and Texas. His expedition traversed much of the state of Georgia from south to north, and it recorded encountering many native groups along the way. These have largely been identified as part of the Mississippian culture and its chiefdoms.

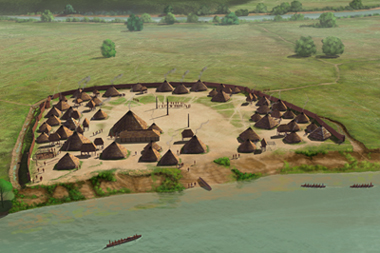
The protohistoric King Site, occupied during the mid-1500s

An expedition of French Protestants founded the colonial settlement of Charlesfort in 1562 on Parris Island off the coast of South Carolina. Jean Ribault and his party of French Huguenots settled an area in the Port Royal Sound area of present-day South Carolina.Within a year the colony failed. Most of the colonists followed René Goulaine de Laudonnière south and founded a new outpost called Fort Caroline in present-day Florida.

Over the next few decades, a number of Spanish explorers from Florida visited the inland region of present-day Georgia. The Mississippian culture way of life, described by de Soto in 1540, had completely disappeared by the mid-1600s. The people may have suffered from new infectious diseases carried by the Europeans. Remaining peoples are believed to have coalesced as the documented historic tribes.

English fur traders from the Province of Carolina first encountered the Creek people in 1690.The English established a fort at Ocmulgee. There they traded iron tools, guns, cloth, and rum for deerskins and Indian slaves, captured by warring tribes in regular raids.

== British colony ==
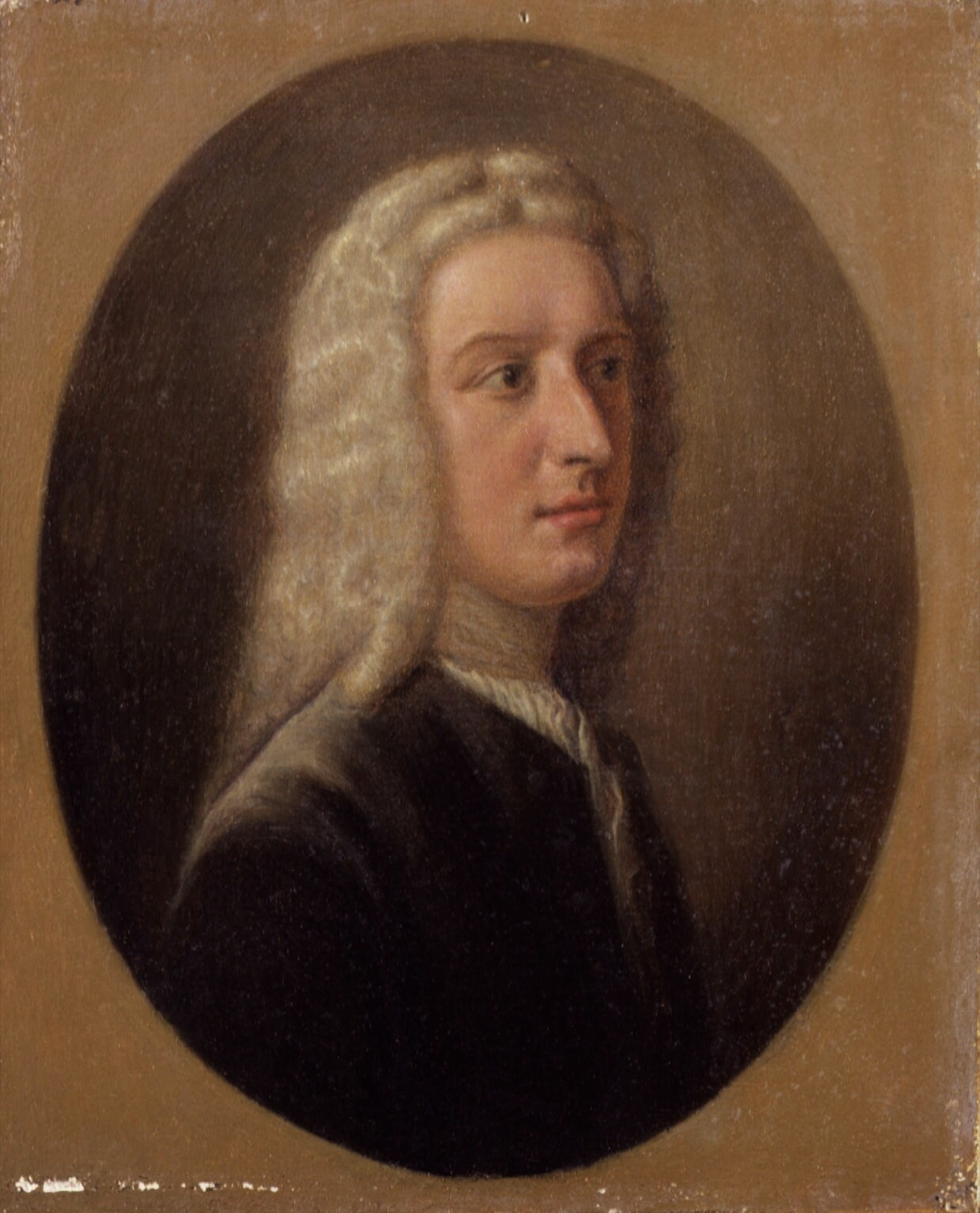
James Oglethorpe, founder of the Georgia Colony

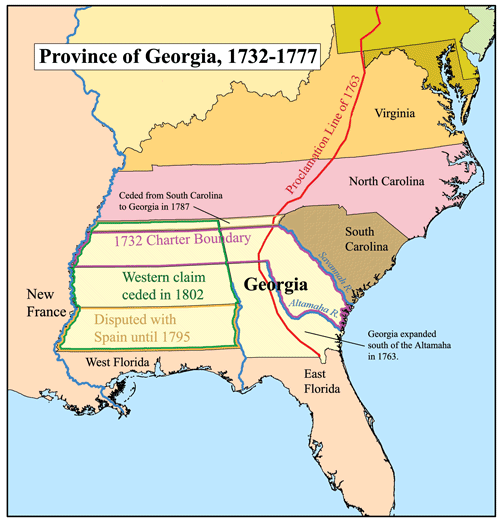
Map of the Province of Georgia, also known as the Georgia Colony

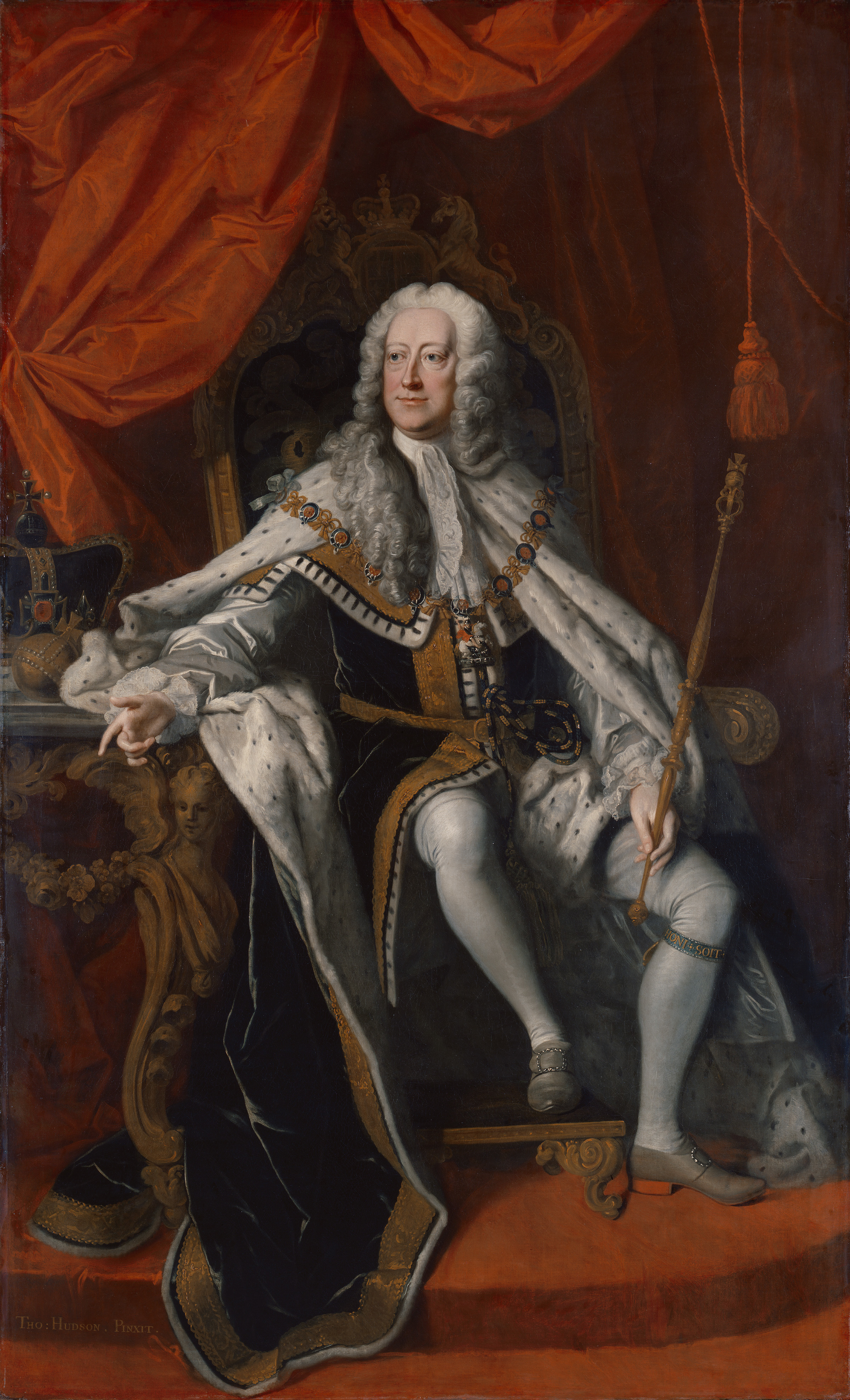
Portrait of George II by Thomas Hudson. Georgia was named after King George II, who approved the colony's charter in 1732

The conflict between Spain and England over control of Georgia began in earnest in about 1670, when the English colony of South Carolina was founded just north of the missionary provinces of Guale and Mocama, part of Spanish Florida. Guale and Mocama, today part of Georgia, lay between Carolina's capital, Charles Town, and Spanish Florida's capital, San Agustín. They were subjected to repeated military invasions by English and Spanish colonists.

The English destroyed the Spanish mission system in Georgia by 1704. The coast of future Georgia was occupied by British-allied Yamasee American Indians until they were decimated in the Yamasee War of 1715–1717, by South Carolina colonists and Indian allies. The surviving Yamasee fled to Spanish Florida, leaving the coast of Georgia depopulated. This enabled formation of a new British colony. A few defeated Yamasee remained and later became known as the Yamacraw.

An early settlement effort was launched in 1717 by Sir Robert Montgomery, who proposed founding the Margravate of Azilia between the Altamaha and Savannah Rivers. Despite some successful fundraising, the proposed colony was never established and Montgomery's grant reverted to the crown by 1729. Proper English settlement began in the early 1730s after James Oglethorpe, a Member of Parliament, proposed that the area be colonized with the "worthy poor" of England, to provide an alternative to the overcrowded debtors' prisons of the period. Oglethorpe and other English philanthropists secured a royal charter as the Trustees of the colony of Georgia on June 9, 1732. The misconception of Georgia's having been founded as a debtor or penal colony persists because numerous English convicts were later sentenced to transportation to Georgia as punishment, with the idea that they would provide labor. With the motto, "Not for ourselves, but for others," the Trustees selected colonists for Georgia.

Oglethorpe and the Trustees formulated a contract, multi-tiered plan for the settlement of Georgia (see the Oglethorpe Plan). The plan framed a system of "agrarian equality" designed to support and perpetuate an economy based on family farming and to prevent the social disintegration they associated with unregulated urbanization. Land ownership was limited to 50 acres (20 ha), a grant that included a town lot, a garden plot near town, and a 45 acres (18 ha) farm. Self-supporting colonists were able to obtain larger grants, but such grants were structured in 50 acres (20 ha) increments tied to "headrights", that is, the number of indentured servants for whom the grantee paid transportation to the colony. Survivors who completed their term of indenture (to pay for the transportation and associated costs), would be granted a parcel of land of their own. No person was permitted to acquire additional land through purchase or inheritance.

On February 12, 1733, the first settlers arrived in the ship Anne, at what was to become the city of Savannah. From 1735 to 1743, Georgia garrisoned Fort Okfuskee at the Creek town of Okfuskee to compete with French trade with the Creeks at Fort Toulouse. In 1742, the colony was invaded by Spanish forces during the War of Jenkins' Ear. Oglethorpe mobilized local forces and defeated the Spanish at the Battle of Bloody Marsh. The Treaty of Aix-la-Chapelle, which ended the war, confirmed the English position in Georgia.

From 1735 to 1750, the trustees of Georgia, unique among Britain's American colonies, prohibited African slavery as a matter of public policy. However, as the growing wealth of the slave-based plantation economy in neighboring South Carolina demonstrated, slaves were more profitable than other forms of labor available to colonists. In addition, improving economic conditions in Europe meant that fewer whites were willing to immigrate as indentured servants. In addition, many of the whites suffered high mortality rates from the climate, tropical diseases and other hardships of the Lowcountry.

In 1749, the state overturned its ban on slavery. From 1750 to 1775, planters so rapidly imported slaves that the enslaved population grew from less than 500 to approximately 18,000 — a majority of people in the colony. Until 1766, the free colonists imported slaves from other British colonies; thereafter planters imported slaves chiefly from the rice-growing regions of present-day Sierra Leone, the Gambia and Angola. Some historians have suggested that the Lowcountry's elaborate earthwork system for rice and indigo cultivation originated in the sophisticated knowledge and material techniques of the newly-imported African slaves. Others argue that rice cultivation had become a settled system before any persons enslaved in risicultural regions arrived at the colony. Later planters developed the infrastructure to grow sugar cane as a cash crop as well.

A scarcity of horses proved to be a constant problem as the colonists tried to develop production of the industry of range cattle. Planters were occasionally able to arrange roundups of wild horses, believed to have escaped from Indian traders or from Spanish Florida.

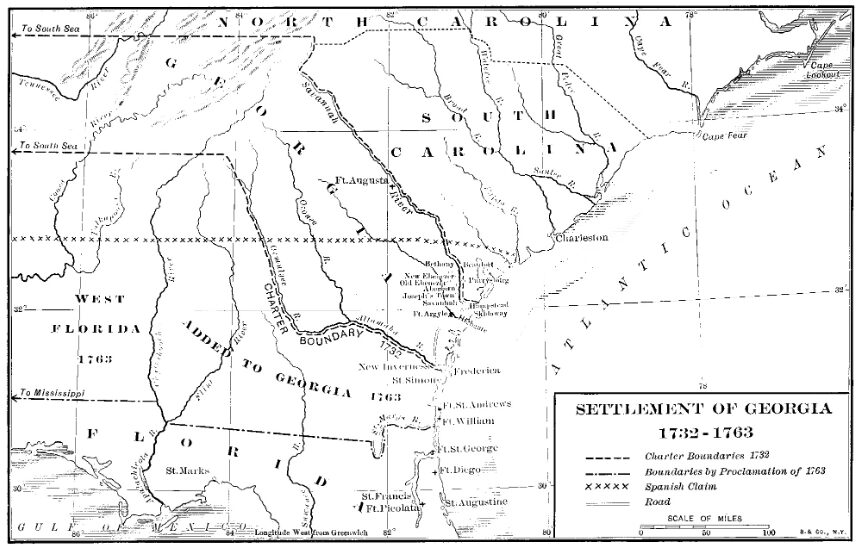
1905 map showing colonial Georgia 1732–63 and surrounding area

In 1752, Georgia became a royal colony. Planters from South Carolina, wealthier than the original settlers of Georgia, migrated south and soon dominated the colony. They replicated the customs and institutions of the South Carolina Lowcountry. Planters had higher rates of absenteeism from their large plantations in the Lowcountry and the Sea Islands than did those in the Upper South. They often took their families to the hills during the summer, the "sick season", when the Lowcountry had high rates of disease carried by mosquitoes, such as malaria and yellow fever. The decade after the end of Trustee rule was a decade of significant growth. Georgia began to grow after the treaty of 1748 ended fear of further attacks from Spain.

By the 1750s, British settlers lived as far south as Cumberland Island. This violated the boundaries set by their own government and Spain, which claimed the territory. British settlers living south of the Altamaha River frequently engaged in trade with Spanish Florida, which was also illegal according to both governments. Such a ban was essentially unenforceable.

Because of the development of large plantations and commodity crops that required numerous slaves for cultivation and processing, the society of the Georgia coast was more like that of such British colonies as Barbados and Jamaica, than of Virginia. The large plantations were worked by numerous African-born slaves. Many of these Africans, although of different languages and tribes, came from closely related geographic areas of West Africa. The slaves of the 'Rice Coast' of South Carolina and Georgia developed the unique Gullah or Geechee culture (the latter term was more common in Georgia), in which important parts of West African linguistic, religious and cultural heritage were preserved and creolized. This multi-ethnic culture developed throughout the Lowcountry and Sea Islands, where enslaved African Americans later worked at cotton plantations. African-American influences, which also absorbed elements of Native American and European-American culture, was strong on the cuisine and music that became integral parts of southern culture.

Georgia was largely untouched by war during much of Britain's involvement in the Seven Years' War. In North America, hostilities took place along a front in the North, along the border with New France and their allied Native American tribes. Americans later called it the French and Indian War. In 1762 Georgia feared a potential Spanish invasion from Florida, although this did not occur by the time peace was signed at the 1763 Treaty of Paris. During this period the Anglo-Cherokee War began.

Governor James Wright wrote in 1766, thirty-two years after its founding, that Georgia had

No manufactures of the least consequence: a trifling quantity of coarse homespun cloth, wool [sic] and cotton mixed; among the poorer sort of people, for their own use, a few cotton and yarn stockings; shoes for our Negroes; and some occasional blacksmith's work. But all our supplies of silk, linens, wool, shoes, stockings, nails, locks, hinges, and tools of every sort ... are all imported from and through Great Britain.

== Capitals of Georgia ==
Georgia has had five different capitals in its history. The first was Savannah, the seat of government during British colonial rule. The State Capital would rotate between Savannah and Augusta during the Revolution until 1786, when the Legislature declared that all future meetings would occur in the latter city. Other Georgia State Capitals include Louisville, Milledgeville, and Atlanta, the capital city from 1868 to the present day. The state legislature has gathered for official meetings in other places, most often in Macon and especially during the American Civil War.

Capital Cities of Georgia
City	Years as Capital
Savannah	1777–1786
Augusta	1786–1796
Louisville	1796–1804
Milledgeville	1804–1868
Atlanta	1868–present

== American revolution ==
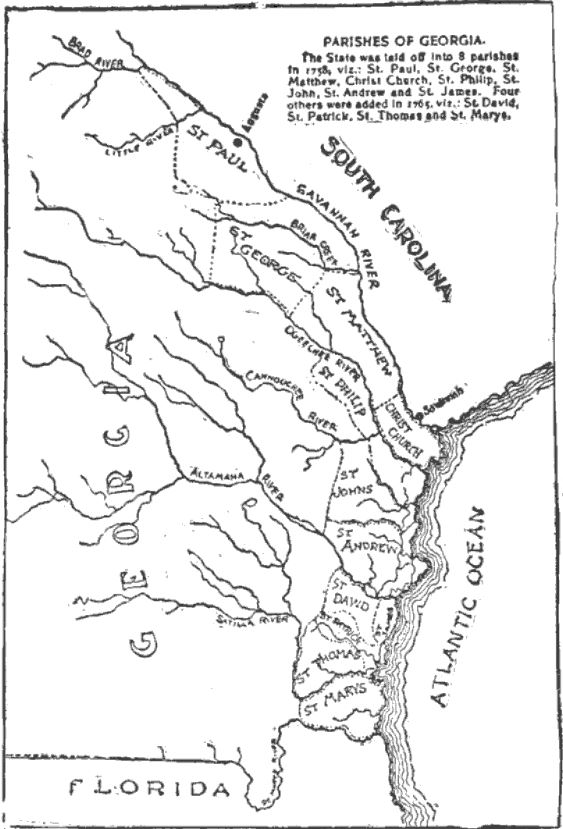
The parishes of Georgia in 1765

Royal governor James Wright was popular, but all of the 13 colonies developed the same strong position defending the traditional rights of Englishmen which they feared London was violating. Georgia and the others moved rapidly toward republicanism which rejected monarchy, aristocracy and corruption, and demanded government based on the will of the people. In particular, they demanded "No taxation without representation" and rejected the Stamp Act in 1765 and all subsequent royal taxes. More fearsome was the British punishment of Boston after the Boston Tea Party. Georgians knew their remote coastal location made them vulnerable.

In August 1774 at a general meeting in Savannah, the people proclaimed, "Protection and allegiance are reciprocal, and under the British Constitution correlative terms; ... the Constitution admits of no taxation without representation." Georgia had few grievances of its own but ideologically supported the patriot cause and expelled the British.

Angered by the news of the battle of Concord, on the eleventh of May 1775, the patriots stormed the royal magazine at Savannah and carried off its ammunition. The customary celebration of the King's birthday on June 4 was turned into a wild demonstration against the King; a liberty pole was erected. Within a month the patriots completely defied royal authority and set up their own government. In June and July, assemblies at Savannah chose a Council of Safety and a Provincial Congress to take control of the government and cooperate with the other colonies. They started raising troops and prepared for war. "In short my lord," wrote Wright to Lord Dartmouth on September 16, 1775, "the whole Executive Power is Assumed by them, and the King's Governor remains little Else than Nominally so."

In February 1776, Wright fled to a British warship and the patriots controlled all of Georgia. The new Congress adopted "Rules and Regulations" on April 15, 1776, which can be considered the Constitution of 1776. (Along with the other American colonies, Georgia declared independence in 1776 when its delegates approved and signed the joint Declaration of Independence.) With that declaration, Georgia ceased to be a colony. It was a state with a weak chief executive, the "President and Commander-in-Chief," who was elected by the state Congress for a term of only six months. Archibald Bulloch, President of the two previous Congresses, was elected first President. He bent his efforts to mobilizing and training the militia. The Constitution of 1777 put power in the hands of the elected House of Assembly, which chose the governor; there was no senate and the franchise was open to nearly all white men.

The new state's exposed seaboard position made it a tempting target for the British Navy. Savannah was captured by British and Loyalist forces in 1778, along with some of its hinterland. Enslaved Africans and African Americans chose their independence by escaping to British lines, where they were promised freedom. About one-third of Georgia's 15,000 slaves escaped during the Revolution.

The patriots moved to Augusta. At the Siege of Savannah in 1779, American and French troops (the latter including a company of free men of color from Saint-Domingue, who were mixed race) fought unsuccessfully to retake the city. During the final years of the American Revolution, Georgia had a functioning Loyalist colonial government along the coast. Together with New York City, it was the last Loyalist bastion.

An early historian reported:

For forty-two long months had she been a prey to rapine, oppression, fratricidal strife, and poverty. Fear, unrest, the brand, the sword, the tomahawk, had been her portion. In the abstraction [removal] of negro slaves, by the burning of dwellings, in the obliteration of plantations, by the destruction of agricultural implements, and by theft of domestic animals and personal effects, it is estimated that at least one half of the available property of the inhabitants had, during this period, been completely swept away. Real estate had depreciated in value. Agriculture was at a stand-still, and there was no money with which to repair these losses and inaugurate a new era of prosperity. The lamentation of widows and orphans, too, were heard in the land. These not only bemoaned their dead, but cried aloud for food. Amid the general depression there was, nevertheless, a deal of gladness in the hearts of the people, a radiant joy, an inspiring hope. Independence had been won.

The end of the war saw a new wave of migration to the state, particularly from the frontiers of Virginia and the Carolinas. George Mathews, soon to be governor of Georgia, was instrumental in this migration.

Georgia ratified the U.S. Constitution on January 2, 1788.

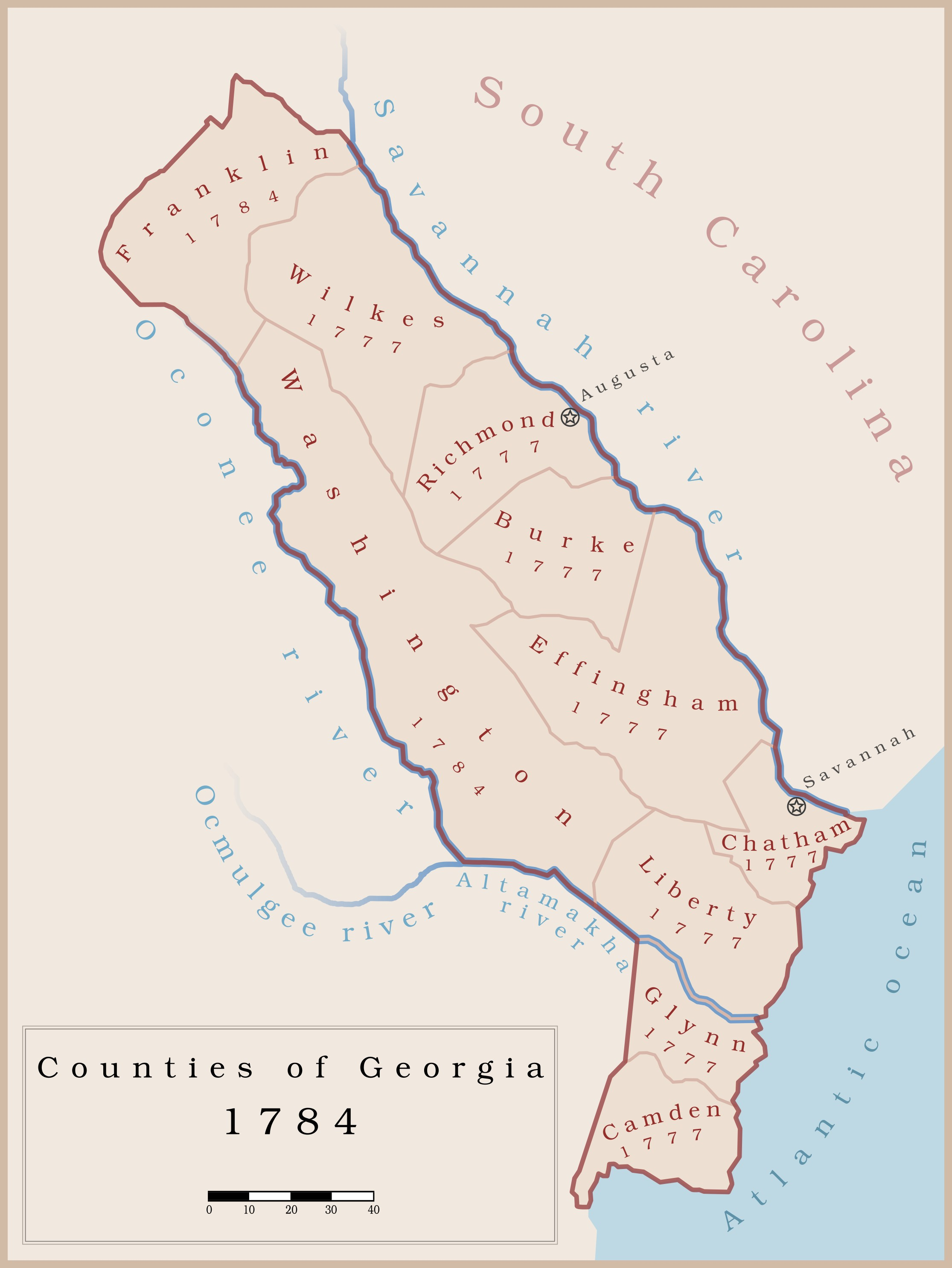
Counties of Georgia at 1784.

The original eight counties of Georgia were Burke, Camden, Chatham, Effingham, Glynn, Liberty, Richmond and Wilkes. Before these counties were created in 1777, Georgia had been divided into local government units called parishes. Each of these original eight counties is named after members of the British government who had supported the American cause during the revolution. As with South Carolina, most of the Loyalists in Georgia (Georgians who had fought for the British cause during the revolution) stayed in Georgia after the war ended. Leading Georgia patriots such as Archibald Bulloch, Stephen Heard, Lyman Hall, John Houstoun, Samuel Elbert, Edward Telfair and George Mathews were all instrumental in both encouraging the Loyalists to stay and in making sure that they were not mistreated during the peace that followed the war. Screven County had hundreds of first generation Scottish immigrants who had all stayed loyal to the crown during the war, Telfair and Mathews personally asked them to stay. In the city of Savannah, Archibald Bulloch, Stephen Heard, Lyman Hall and John Houstoun all made personal appeals to the loyalists to "stay on" after the war ended and make the best of their lives under the new republican form of government.

== Antebellum period ==
During the 77 years of the Antebellum period, the area of Georgia was soon reduced by half from the Mississippi River back to the current state line by 1802. The ceded land was added into the Mississippi Territory by 1804, following the Louisiana Purchase, with the state of Alabama later created in 1819 to become the west Georgia state line. Also during this period, large cotton plantations dominated the inland areas, while rice farming was popular near the coast. The slave population increased to work the plantations, but the native Cherokee tribe was removed and resettled west in Oklahoma, in the final two decades before the Civil War, as explained further in the paragraphs below.

=== Reduced state lines ===
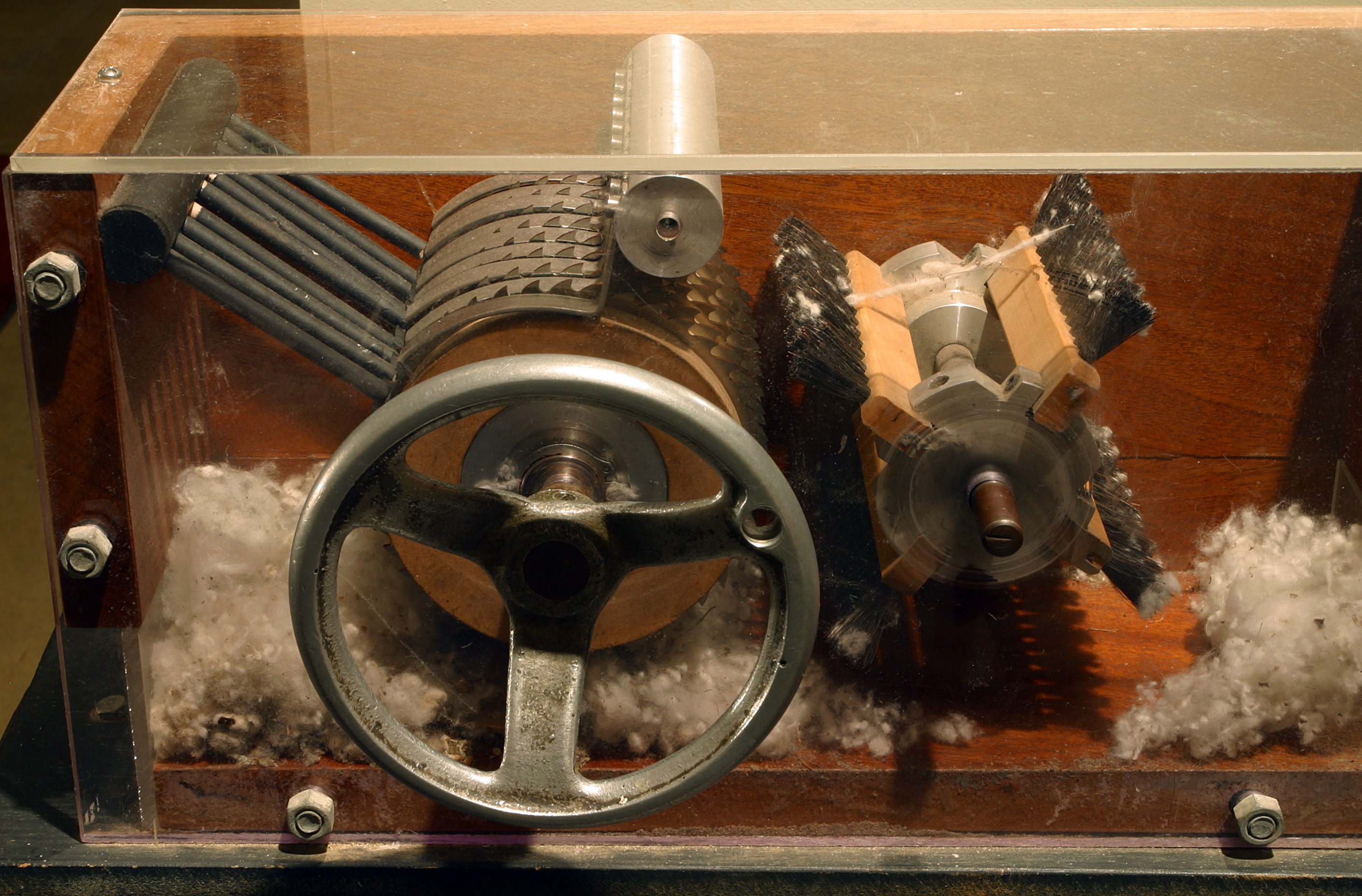
A 19th-century cotton gin on display at the Eli Whitney Museum in Hamden, Connecticut

In 1787, the Treaty of Beaufort had established the eastern boundary of Georgia, from the Atlantic seashore up the Savannah River, at South Carolina, to modern day Tugalo Lake (construction to the Tugalo dam was started in 1917 and completed in 1923). Twelve to fourteen miles (19–23 km) of land (inhabited at the time by the Cherokee Nation) separate the lake from the southern boundary of North Carolina. South Carolina ceded its claim to this land (extending all the way to the Pacific Ocean) to the federal government.

Georgia maintained a claim on western land from 31° N to 35° N, the southern part of which overlapped with the Mississippi Territory created from part of Spanish Florida in 1798. Following a series of land scandals, Georgia ceded its claims in 1802, fixing its present western boundary. In 1804, the federal government added the cession to the Mississippi Territory.

The Treaty of 1816 fixed the present-day northern boundary between Georgia and South Carolina at the Chattooga River, proceeding northwest from the lake. The Mississippi Territory was split on December 10, 1817, to form the U.S. state of Mississippi and the Alabama Territory for 2 years; then in December 1819, the new state of Alabama became the western boundary of Georgia.

=== Indian relocation ===
After the Creek War (corresponding with the War of 1812), some Muscogee leaders signed treaties that ceded land to Georgia, including the 1814 signing of the Treaty of Fort Jackson. Under this treaty, General Andrew Jackson forced the Creek confederacy to surrender more than 21 million acres in what is now southern Georgia and central Alabama. On February 12, 1825, William McIntosh and other chiefs signed the Treaty of Indian Springs, which gave up most of the remaining Creek lands in Georgia. After the U.S. Senate ratified the treaty, McIntosh was assassinated on April 30, 1825, by Creeks led by Menawa.

In 1829, gold was discovered in the north Georgia mountains, resulting in the Georgia Gold Rush, the second gold rush in U.S. history. A federal mint was established in Dahlonega, Georgia, and continued to operate until 1861. During the early 1800s, Cherokee Indians owned their ancestral land, operated their own government with a written constitution, and did not recognize the authority of the state of Georgia. An influx of white settlers pressured the U.S. government to expel them. The dispute culminated in the Indian Removal Act of 1830, under which all eastern tribes were sent west to Indian reservations in present-day Oklahoma. In Worcester v. Georgia, the Supreme Court in 1832 ruled that states were not permitted to redraw the boundaries of Indian lands, but President Andrew Jackson and the state of Georgia ignored the ruling.

Escalating tensions with Creek tribes erupted into open war with the United States following the destruction of the village of Roanoke, Georgia, located along the Chattahoochee River on the boundary between Creek and American territory, in May 1836. During the so-called "Creek War of 1836" Secretary of War Lewis Cass dispatched General Winfield Scott to end the violence by forcibly removing the Creeks to the Indian Territory west of the Mississippi River.

In 1838, Andrew Jackson's successor, President Martin van Buren dispatched federal troops to round up the Cherokee and deport them west of the Mississippi. This forced relocation, beginning in White County, became known as the Trail of Tears and led to the death of over 4,000 Cherokees.

=== Land allocations ===
In 1794, Eli Whitney, a Massachusetts-born artisan residing in Savannah, Georgia, had patented a cotton gin, mechanizing the separation of cotton fibres from their seeds. The Industrial Revolution had resulted in the mechanized spinning and weaving of cloth in the world's first factories in the north of England. Fueled by the soaring demands of British textile manufacturers, King Cotton quickly came to dominate Georgia and the other southern states. Although Congress had banned the slave trade in 1808, Georgia's slave population continued to grow with the importation of slaves from the plantations of the South Carolina Lowcountry and Chesapeake Tidewater, increasing from 149,656 in 1820 to 280,944 in 1840. A small population of free blacks developed, mostly working as artisans. The Georgia legislature unanimously passed a resolution in 1842 declaring that free blacks were not U.S. citizens. However, national citizenship is defined by federal statute. While an indication of sentiment, this state resolution did not have the power of law.

Slaves worked the fields in large cotton plantations, and the economy of the state became dependent on the institution of slavery. Requiring little cultivation, most efficiently grown on large plantations by large (slave) workforces, and easy to transport, cotton proved ideally suited to the inland frontier. The lower Piedmont or 'Black Belt' counties – comprising the middle third of the state and initially named for the region's distinctively dark and fertile soil – became the site of the largest and most productive cotton plantations. By 1860, the slave population in the Black Belt was three times greater than that of the coastal counties, where rice remained the principal crop. The upper Piedmont was settled mainly by white yeoman farmers of English descent. While there were also many smaller cotton plantations, the proportion of slaves was lower in north Georgia than in the coastal and Black Belt counties, but it still ranged up to 25% of the population. In 1,860 inches (4,700 cm) the state as a whole, enslaved African Americans comprised 44% of the population of slightly more than one million.

=== Education ===
Until the 20th century, there were no public secondary schools, although there were several private and religious schools.

Post-secondary education was formalized in 1785, with the establishment of the University of Georgia, the first university in the U.S. to gain a state charter. Rural families often pooled their resources to hire itinerant teachers for a month or two at a time. Ten grammar schools were in operation by 1770, many taught by ministers. Most had some government funding, and many were free to both male and female white students. A study of women's signatures indicates a high degree of literacy in areas with schools.

Georgia's early promise in education faded after 1800. Public education was established by the Reconstruction era legislatures in the South, but after Democrats regained power, they hardly funded them. The entire rural South had limited public schooling until after 1900, and black schools were underfunded in the segregated society.

Wealthy Georgians took care of their own, sending their children to private academies. The Presbyterians were especially active in creating academies, including numerous schools for women. They included Georgia Female College, Rome Female College, Greensboro Female College, Griffin Synodical Female College, Thomasville/Young's Female College, and the most enduring of all, Decatur Female Seminary, now Agnes Scott College.

== Civil War ==
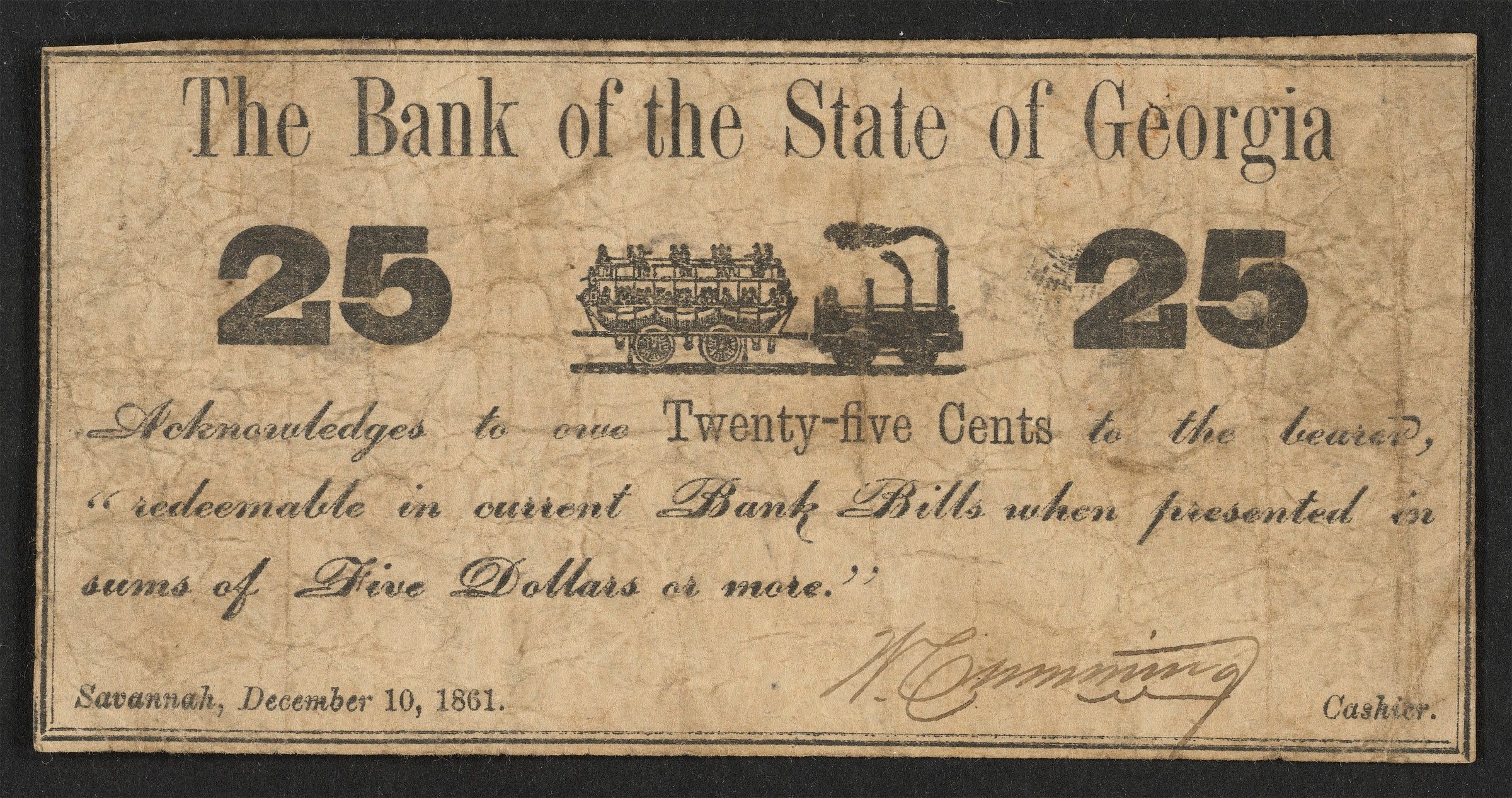
1861 Bank of the State of Georgia 25-cent banknote

On January 19, 1861, Georgia seceded from the Union, keeping the name "State of Georgia" and joining the newly formed Confederacy in February. White solidarity was strong in 1861–63, as the planters in the Black Belt formed a common cause with upcountry yeomen farmers in defense of the Confederacy against the Union. Around 120,000 Georgians served in the Confederate Army. However disillusionment set in by 1863, with class tensions becoming more serious, including food riots, desertions, and growing Unionist activity in the northern mountain region. Approximately 5,000 Georgians (both black and white troops) served in the Union Army in units including the 1st Georgia Infantry Battalion, the 1st Alabama Cavalry Regiment, and a number of East Tennessean regiments. Governor Joseph E. Brown tried to divert attention by blaming the Confederate officials in Richmond, especially President Jefferson Davis, and insisting that many Georgia troops be kept at home. Brown was by the Augusta Chronicle and Sentinel, an influential weekly newspaper that repeatedly attacked the Davis administration, especially after the suspension of the writ of habeas corpus on February 15, 1864.

=== Military history ===
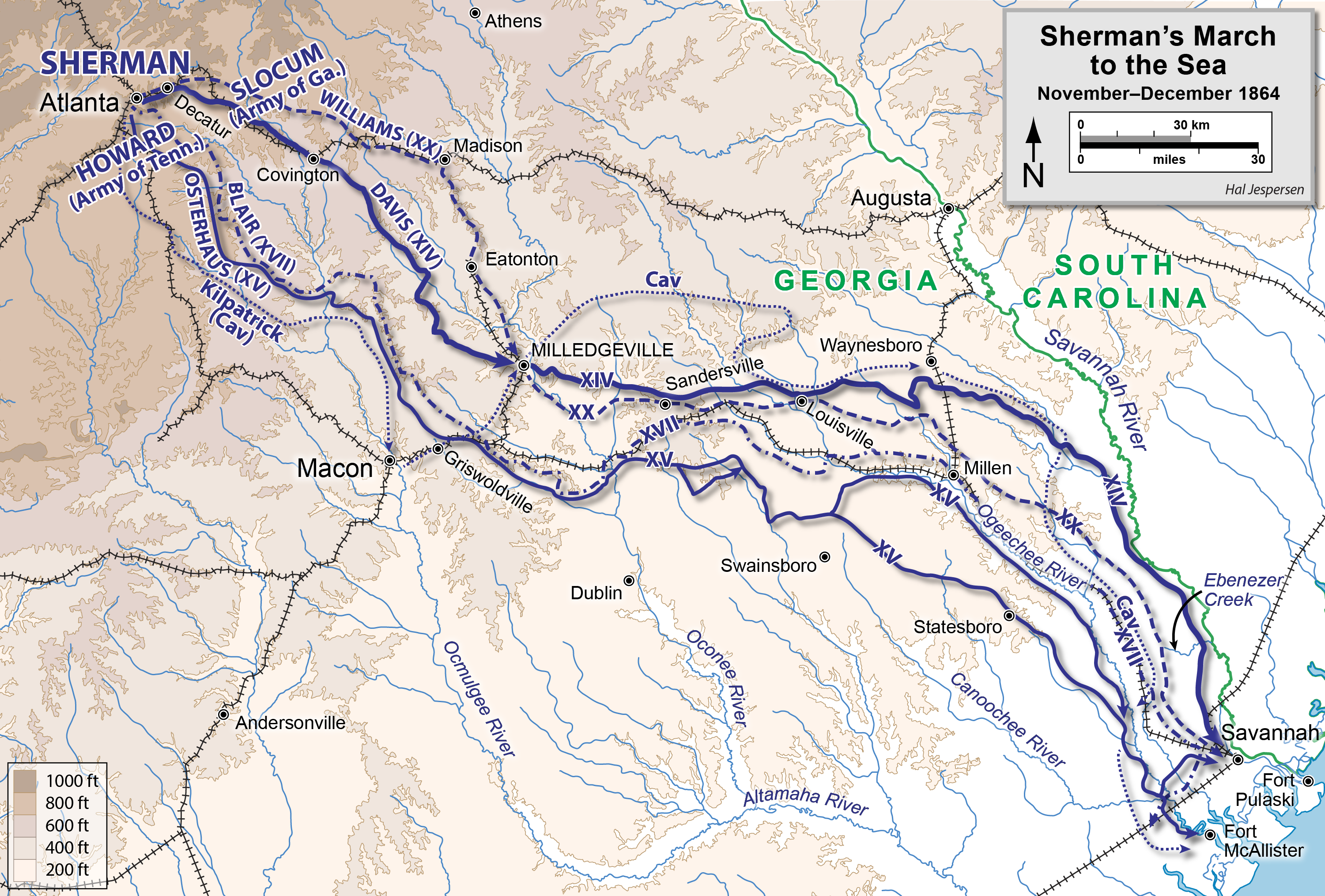
Sherman's March to the Sea, November–December 1864

Georgia sent around one hundred twenty thousand soldiers to the Confederacy, mostly to the armies in Virginia. More than five thousand Georgians (both black and white) joined the Union Army, mostly in units raised in East Tennessee and Northern Alabama. Most of these Union troops came from the Mountains in North Georgia.

The first major battle in Georgia was a Confederate victory at the Battle of Chickamauga in 1863. It was the last major Confederate victory in the west. Following President Abraham Lincoln's Emancipation Proclamation of January 1863, slaves began to leave plantations to join Union lines and gain freedom. In 1864, William T. Sherman's armies invaded Georgia as part of the Atlanta campaign. Confederate general Joseph E. Johnston fought a series of delaying battles, the largest being the Battle of Kennesaw Mountain, as he tried to delay as long as possible retreating toward Atlanta. Johnston's replacement, Gen. John Bell Hood attempted several unsuccessful counterattacks at the Battle of Peachtree Creek and the Battle of Atlanta, but Sherman captured the city on September 2, 1864.

In November Sherman stripped his army of non-essentials and began his famous Sherman's March to the Sea, living off the land and burning plantations, wrecking railroads, and killing the livestock. Thousands of escaped slaves followed his troops across the region as he entered Savannah on December 22. After the loss of Atlanta, the governor withdrew the state's militia from the Confederate forces to harvest crops for the state and the army. They did not try to stop Sherman.

Sherman's March was devastating to Georgia and the Confederacy in terms of economics and psychology. Sherman estimated that the campaign had inflicted $100 million (about $1.4 billion in 2010 dollars) in destruction, about one fifth of which "inured to our advantage" while the "remainder is simple waste and destruction." His army wrecked 300 miles (480 km) of railroad and numerous bridges and miles of telegraph lines. It seized 5,000 horses, 4,000 mules, and 13,000 head of cattle. It confiscated 9.5 million pounds of corn and 10.5 million pounds of fodder, and destroyed uncounted cotton gins and mills.

Sherman's campaign of total war extended to Georgia civilians. In July 1864, during the Atlanta campaign, General Sherman ordered approximately 400 Roswell mill workers, mostly women, arrested as traitors and shipped as prisoners to the North with their children. This was a common tactic of Sherman to economically disrupt the South. There is little evidence that more than a few of the women ever returned home.

The memory of Sherman's March became iconic and central to the "Myth of the Lost Cause." The crisis was the setting for Margaret Mitchell's 1936 novel Gone with the Wind and the subsequent 1939 film. Most important were many "salvation stories" that tell not what Union soldiers destroyed, but what was saved by the quick thinking and crafty women on the home front, loyal slaves, or was preserved due to appreciation of the beauty of homes and the charm of Southern women.

=== Food shortages ===
By summer 1861, the Union naval blockade virtually shut down the export of cotton and the import of manufactured goods. Food that formerly came overland was cut off. In response, the governor and legislature pleaded with planters to grow less cotton and more food. Most refused, some believing that the Yankees would not or could not fight. When cotton prices soared in Europe, expectations were that Europe would soon intervene to break the blockade. Neither proved true and the myth of omnipotent "King Cotton" died hard. The legislature imposed cotton quotas, making it a crime to grow an excess. But food shortages only worsened, especially in the towns. Poor white women raised more than two dozen riots when they raided stores and captured supply wagons to get such necessities as bacon, corn, flour, and cotton yarn. As the South lost control of more and more of its major ocean and river ports, it had to rely on a rickety railroad system and unimproved roads to move soldiers and supplies. Atlanta became the Confederacy's chief rail center, thus making it a prime target for Sherman. Thinking the state was safe from invasion, the Confederates built small munitions factories throughout the state as well as soldier hospitals and prison camps.

=== Andersonville prison ===
In 1864, the government relocated Union prisoners of war from Richmond, Virginia, to the town of Andersonville, in remote southwest Georgia. It proved a death camp because of overcrowding and a severe lack of supplies, food, water, and medicine. During its 15 months of operation, the Andersonville prison camp held 45,000 Union soldiers; at least 13,000 died from disease, malnutrition, starvation, or exposure. At its peak, the death rate was more than 100 persons per day. After the war, the camp's commanding officer, Captain Henry Wirz, was the only Confederate to be tried and executed as a war criminal.

== Reconstruction ==
At war's end the devastation and disruption in every part of the state was dramatic. Wartime damage, disruption to plantations, and miserable weather had a disastrous effect on agricultural production before the end of the war. Production of the state's chief money crop, cotton, fell from a high of more than 700,000 bales in 1860 to less than 50,000 in 1865, while harvests of corn and wheat were also meager. After the war, the state subsidized construction of numerous new railroad lines to improve infrastructure and connections to markets. Use of commercial fertilizers increased cotton production in Georgia's upcountry, but the coastal rice plantations never recovered from the war.

In January 1865, William T. Sherman issued Special Field Orders, No. 15 authorizing federal authorities to confiscate abandoned plantations in the Sea Islands and redistribute land in smaller plots to former slaves. Later that year, after succeeding Lincoln in the presidency after he was assassinated, Andrew Johnson revoked the order and returned the plantations to their former owners.

At the beginning of the period of Reconstruction, Georgia had more than 460,000 freedmen. Slaves made up 44% of the state's population in 1860. After the Civil War, many former slaves moved from rural areas to Atlanta, where economic opportunities were better. Free from white supervision, they established their own communities. Other migrations involved blacks moving from plantations to adjacent small towns and communities. A new federal agency the Freedmen's Bureau helped blacks negotiate labor contracts, and set up schools and churches. The region's planters struggled with the transition to paid labor and tried to control the movement of blacks through Black Codes.

Andrew Johnson's decision to restore the former Confederate states to the Union, without requirements for political change, was criticized by Radical Republicans in Congress. In March 1867, Congress passed the First Reconstruction Act to place the South under military occupation and rule. Along with Alabama and Florida, Georgia was included in the Third Military District, under the command of General John Pope. Military rule lasted less than a year. It supervised the first elections in which black men could vote. The electoral roll in 1867 included 102,000 eligible white men, and 99,000 eligible black men. Radical Republicans in Congress required ex-Confederates to take an ironclad oath of loyalty or be prevented from holding office. The legislature was controlled by a biracial coalition of newly enfranchised freedmen, Northerners (carpetbaggers), and white Southerners (disparagingly called scalawags). The latter were mostly former Whigs who had opposed secession.

The voters elected delegates to write a new constitution in 1868; 20% of the delegates were black. In July 1868, the newly elected General Assembly ratified the Fourteenth Amendment; a Republican governor, Rufus Bullock, was inaugurated, and Georgia was readmitted to the Union. The state's Democrats, including former Confederate leaders Robert Toombs and Howell Cobb, convened in Atlanta to denounce Reconstruction. Theirs was described as the largest mass rally held in Georgia. In September, white Republicans joined with the Democrats in expelling all thirty-two black legislators from the General Assembly. Refusing to give up social domination, some ex-Confederates organized insurgent paramilitary groups, especially chapters of the newly formed Ku Klux Klan. Freedmen's Bureau agents reported 336 cases of murder or assault with intent to kill perpetrated against freedmen across the state from January 1 through November 15, 1868.

In 1868, under Reconstruction, Georgia became the first state in the South to implement the convict lease system. It generated revenue for the state by leasing out the prison population, many of whom were black, to work for private businesses and citizens. Prisoners did not receive income for their labor. In this manner, railroad companies, mines, turpentine distilleries and other manufacturers supplemented their workforce with unpaid convict labor. This helped to hasten Georgia's transition to industrialization. Under the convict release system, employers were legally obliged to provide humane treatment to the laborers. But the system was easily abused and akin to slavery. One prominent beneficiary of this system was the Republican jurist and politician Joseph E. Brown, whose railroads, coal mines and iron works supplemented their workforce with convict labor.

The activity of political groups opposed to Reconstruction prompted Republicans and others to call for the return of Georgia to military rule. Georgia was one of only two ex-Confederate states to vote against Ulysses S. Grant in the presidential election of 1868. In March 1869, the state legislature defeated ratification of the Fifteenth Amendment.

That same month, the U.S. Congress, citing election fraud, barred Georgia's representatives from taking their seats. This culminated in military rule being re-imposed in December 1869. In January 1870, Gen. Alfred H. Terry, the final commanding general of the Third District, purged the General Assembly of ex-Confederates. He replaced them with Republican runners-up and reinstated expelled black legislators. This militarily imposed General Assembly had a large Republican majority.

In February 1870, the newly constituted legislature ratified the Fifteenth Amendment and chose new Senators to send to Washington. On July 15, Georgia became the last former Confederate state readmitted into the Union. After military rule ended, Democrats won commanding majorities in both houses of the General Assembly, aided by election violence and fraud. Some Reconstruction-era black legislators held on to their seats through the legislature's passage of laws disfranchising blacks, starting with a poll tax in 1877; the last black legislator served until 1907. In 1908 provisions of a new constitution completed black disfranchisement. Under threat of impeachment, Republican governor Rufus Bullock fled the state.

== Postbellum economic growth ==
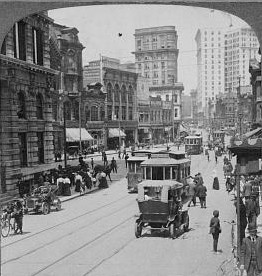
Peachtree Street, the main street of Atlanta, busy with streetcars and automobiles (1907)

Under the Reconstruction government, the state capital was moved from Milledgeville to the inland rail terminus of Atlanta. Construction began on a new capitol building, which was completed by 1889. With the city a center of trade and government, the population of Atlanta increased rapidly.

Post-Reconstruction Georgia was dominated by the Bourbon Triumvirate of Joseph E. Brown, Major General John B. Gordon and Gen. Alfred H. Colquitt. Between 1872 and 1890, either Brown or Gordon held one of Georgia's Senate seats, Colquitt held the other, and, in the major part of that period, either Colquitt or Gordon occupied the Governor's office. Democrats effectively monopolized state politics. Colquitt represented the old planter class; Brown, head of Western & Atlantic Railroad and one of the states first millionaires, represented the New South businessmen. Gordon was neither a planter nor a successful businessman, but the former Confederate General proved a most skilled politician.

Gordon was thought by some to be the titular leader of the 1st Ku Klux Klan in Georgia. He was the first former Confederate to serve in the U.S. Senate. He helped negotiate the Compromise of 1877 that ended Reconstruction and led to the end of federal enforcement of laws protecting blacks. A native of northwest Georgia, his popularity impeded the growth of the 'mountain Republicanism,' which was prevalent elsewhere in Appalachian areas where slavery had been minor and resentment against the planter class widespread.

During the Gilded Age, Georgia slowly recovered from the devastation of the Civil War. One of the most enduring products came about in reaction to the age's excesses. In 1885, when Atlanta and Fulton County enacted prohibition legislation against alcohol, a local pharmacist, John Pemberton invented a new soda drink. Two years later, after he sold the drink to Asa Candler who promoted it, Coca-Cola became the state's most famous product.

Henry W. Grady, editor of The Atlanta Constitution, emerged as the leading spokesman of the 'New South'. He promoted sectional reconciliation and the region's place in a rapidly industrializing nation. The International Cotton Exposition of 1881 and the Cotton States and International Exposition of 1895 were staged to promote Georgia and the South as textile centers. They attracted mills from New England to build a new economic base in the post-war South by diversifying the region's agrarian economies. Attracted by low labor costs and the proximity to raw materials, new textile businesses transformed Columbus and Atlanta, as well as Graniteville, on the Georgia-South Carolina border, into textile manufacturing centers.

Due to Georgia's relatively untapped virgin forests, particularly in the thinly populated pine savanna of the Atlantic Coastal Plain, logging became a major industry. It supported other new industries, most notably paper mills and turpentine distilling, which, by 1900, made Georgia the leading producer of naval stores. Also important were coal, granite and kaolin mining, the latter used in the manufacture of paper, bricks and ceramic piping.

In the volatile 1880s and 1890s, political violence suppressed black voting as white Democrats imposed laws for Jim Crow and white supremacy. Whites increased their lynchings of blacks, reaching its height in 1899, when 27 Georgians were killed by lynch mobs. From 1890 to 1900, Georgia averaged more than one mob killing per month. More than 95% of the victims of the 450 lynchings documented between 1882 and 1930 were black.

This period also corresponded to Georgia's disfranchisement of blacks and many poor whites through changes to its constitution and addition of such requirements as poll taxes (1877), literacy and comprehension tests, and residency requirements. In 1900 blacks comprised 46.7% of the population, but hardly any could register and vote. The state instituted a white primary in 1908; as it was a one-party state by that time, this further excluded the chance of black political participation. This situation prevailed into the mid-20th century.

The Cotton States and International Exposition was the venue for Booker T. Washington's speech promoting what became known as the Atlanta Compromise. He urged blacks to focus their efforts, not on demands for social equality, but to improve their own conditions by becoming proficient in skills for available jobs in agriculture, mechanics, and domestic service. He proposed building a broad base within existing conditions in the South. He urged whites to take responsibility to improve social and economic relations between the races.

Black leaders such as W. E. B. Du Bois, who supported classical academic standards for education, disagreed with Washington and said he was acquiescing to oppression. Born in Massachusetts, Du Bois had earned his doctorate in Germany and was one of the most highly educated black men in America; in 1897 he joined the faculty of Atlanta University and taught there for several years.

== Agrarian unrest and disfranchisement ==
While Grady and other proponents of the New South insisted on Georgia's urban future, the state's economy remained overwhelmingly dependent on cotton. Much of the industrialization that did occur was as a subsidiary of cotton agriculture; many of the state's new textile factories were devoted to the manufacture of simple cotton bags. The price per pound of cotton plummeted from $1 at the end of the Civil War to an average of 20 cents in the 1870s, nine cents in the 1880s, and seven cents in the 1890s. By 1898, it had fallen to five cents a pound -while costing seven cents to produce. Once-prosperous planters suffered significant hardship.

Thousands of freedmen became tenant farmers or sharecroppers rather than hire out to labor gangs. Through the lien system, small-county merchants assumed a central role in cotton production, monopolizing the supply of equipment, fertilizers, seeds and foodstuffs needed to make sharecropping possible. By the 1890s, as cotton prices plummeted below production costs, 80–90% of cotton growers, whether owner or tenant, were in debt to lien merchants.

Indebted Georgia cotton growers responded by embracing the "agrarian radicalism" manifested, successively, in the 1870s with the Granger movement, in the 1880s with the Farmers' Alliance, and in the 1890s with the Populist Party. In 1892, Congressman Tom Watson joined the Populists, becoming the most visible spokesman for their predominately Western Congressional delegation. Southern Populists denounced the convict lease system, while urging white and black small farmers to unite on the basis of shared economic self-interest. They generally refrained from advocating social equality.

In his essay 'The Negro Question in the South,' Watson framed his appeal for a united front between black and white farmers declaring:

"You are kept apart that you may be separately fleeced of your earnings. You are made to hate each other because upon that hatred is rested the keystone of the arch of financial despotism which enslaves you both. You are deceived and blinded that you may not see how this race antagonism perpetuates a monetary system which beggars both."

Southern Populists did not share their Western counterparts' emphasis on Free Silver and bitterly opposed their desire for fusion with the Democratic Party. They had faced death threats, mob violence and ballot-box stuffing to challenge the monopoly of their states' Bourbon Democrat political machines. The merger with the Democratic Party in the 1896 Presidential election dealt a fatal blow to Southern Populism. The Populists nominated Watson as William Jennings Bryan's vice-president, but Bryan selected New England industrialist Arthur Sewall as a concession to Democratic leaders.

Watson was not reelected. As the Populist Party disintegrated, through his periodical The Jeffersonian, Watson crusaded as an anti-Catholic and (eventually) a white supremacist. He attacked the socialism, which had attracted many former Populists. He campaigned with little success for the party's candidate for President in 1904 and 1908. Watson continued to exert influence in Georgia politics, and provided a key endorsement in the gubernatorial campaign of M. Hoke Smith.

=== Disenfranchisement and court challenges ===
A former cabinet member in Grover Cleveland's administration, M. Hoke Smith broke with Cleveland because of his support for Bryan. Hoke Smith's tenure as governor was noted for the passage of Jim Crow laws and the 1908 constitutional amendment that required a person to satisfy qualifications for literacy tests and property ownership for voting. Because a grandfather clause was used to waive those requirements for most whites, the legislation effectively secured the disenfranchisement of African Americans. Georgia's amendment was made following 1898 and 1903 Supreme Court decisions that had upheld similar provisions in the constitutions of Mississippi and Alabama.

The new provisions were devastating for the African-American community and poor whites, as losing the ability to register to vote meant they were excluded from serving on juries or in local office, as well as losing all representation at local, state and Federal levels. In 1900 African Americans numbered 1,035,037 in Georgia, nearly 47% of the state's population.

Litigation in Georgia and elsewhere brought some relief, as in the overturning of the grandfather clause in the U.S. Supreme Court ruling, Guinn v. United States (1915). White-dominated state legislatures and the state Democratic parties quickly responded by creating new barriers to an expanded franchise, such as white-only primaries.

The last black member of the General Assembly, W. H. Rogers, resigned in 1907 as the final representative of the Reconstruction-era coastal Georgia political machine.

== Progressive era ==
The rapidly growing middle class of professionals, businessmen and educated, worked to bring the Progressive Era to Georgia in the early 20th century. The goal was to modernize the state, increase efficiency, apply scientific methods, promote education and eliminate waste and corruption. Key leaders were governors Joseph M. Terrell (1902–07) and Hoke Smith. Terrell pushed through important legislation covering judicial affairs, schools, food and drug regulation, taxation and labor measures. He failed to obtain necessary penal and railroad reforms.

A representative local leader was newspaper editor Thomas Lee Bailey (1865–1945), who used his Cochran Journal to reach out to Bleckley County, from 1910 to 1925. The paper mirrored Bailey's personality and philosophy for it was folksy, outspoken, and upbeat and covered a variety of local topics. Bailey was a strong advocate for diversified farming, quality education, civic and political reform, and controls on alcohol and gambling.

=== Cotton ===
In the early 1900s, Georgia experienced economic expansion in both the manufacturing and agricultural sectors. The cotton industry benefited from the depredations of the boll weevil further west. In 1911, Georgia produced a record 2.8 million bales of cotton. However, the boll weevil arrived in Georgia four years later. By 1921, infestation had reached such epidemic proportions that 45% of the state's cotton crop was destroyed. Demand during World War I drove cotton prices to a high of $1 a pound. After 1919, however, cotton quickly fell to 10 cents per pound. Landowners ruined by the boll weevil and declining prices expelled their sharecroppers.

=== African Americans ===
Although blacks also participated in the Progressive movement, the state remained in the grip of Jim Crow. In 1934, Georgia's poll tax, which also had excluded poor whites from voter rolls to reduce the Populist threat, was upheld in the Supreme Court case of Breedlove v. Suttles (1937). That challenge was brought by a poor white man seeking the ability to vote without paying a fee. By 1940 only 20,000 blacks in Georgia managed to register. In 1944 the Supreme Court's decision in Smith v. Allwright banned white primaries, and in 1945 Georgia repealed its poll tax. NAACP and other activists rapidly registered African Americans in cities such as Atlanta, but in rural areas they remained outside politics.

Starting around 1910, and increasing as jobs began to open up during World War I, tens of thousands of African Americans in the Great Migration moved to northern industrial cities out of the rural South for work, better education for their children, the right to vote and for escape from the violence of lynchings. From 1910 to 1940 and in a second wave from the 1940s to 1970, a total of more than 6.5 million African Americans left the South for northern and western industrial cities. They rapidly became urbanized, and many built successful middle-class lives as industrial workers. The demographics of the regions changed.

=== Prohibition and Coca-Cola ===
Prohibition was a central issue in local and state politics from the 1880s into the 1920s. Before World War I, it was widely believed that the solution to drunkenness was the religious revival, which would turn the sinner into a teetolaling Christian. The Drys were led by ministers and middle-class women of the Woman's Christian Temperance Union, who succeeded in securing a local option law that dried up most of the rural counties. Atlanta and the other cities were wet strongholds.

By 1907, the much more effective Anti-Saloon League took over from the preachers and women and cut deals with the politicians, such as Hoke Smith. The League pushed through a prohibition law in 1907. However, the law had loopholes that allowed Georgians to import whiskey from other states through the mail, and provided for "saloons" that supposedly sold only non-alcoholic drinks. In 1915, the drys passed a state law that effectively closed nearly all the liquor traffic. Illegal distilling and bootlegging continued.

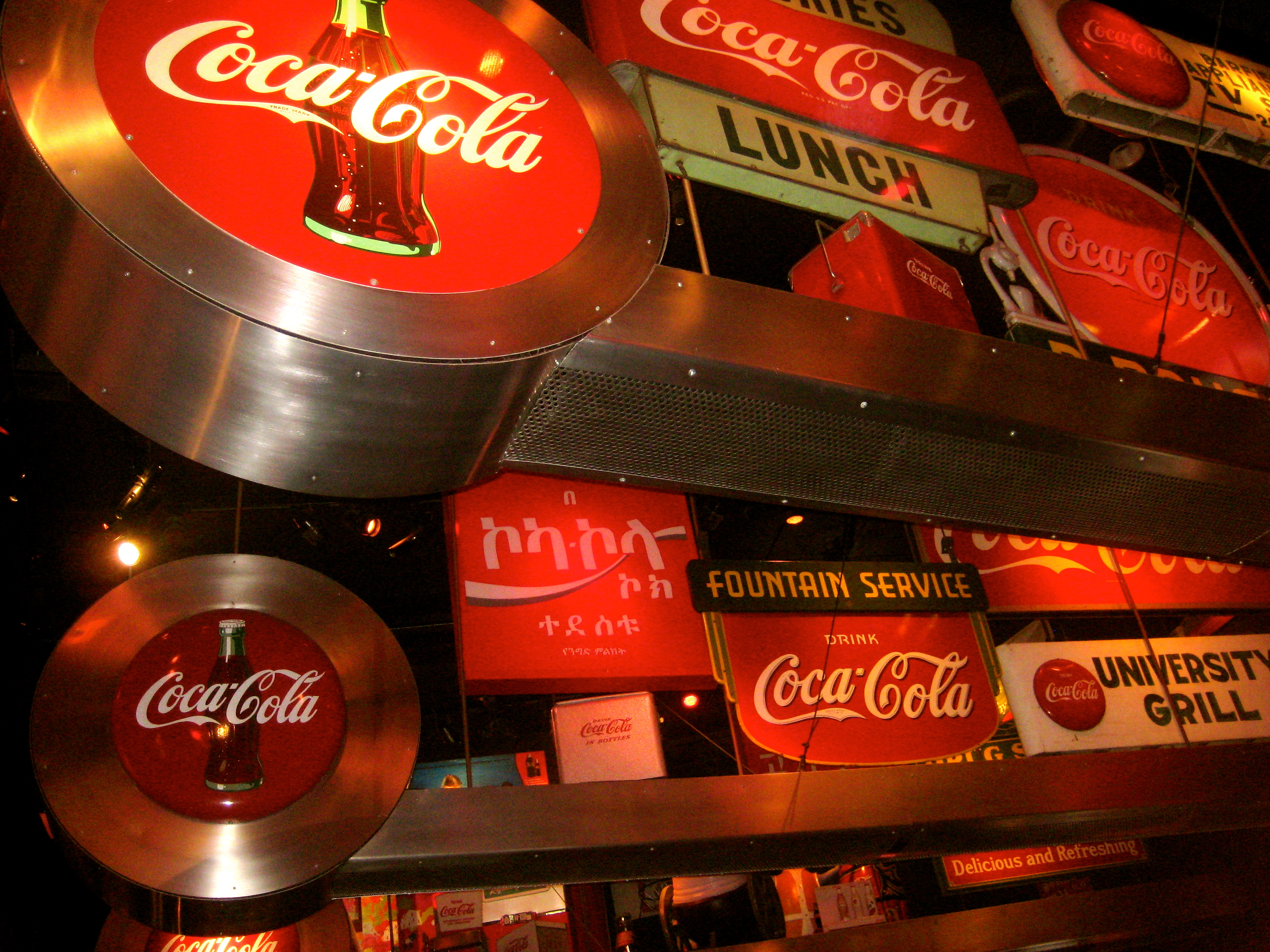
World of Coca-Cola museum in Atlanta, Georgia

During this time, a non-alcoholic beverage, first introduced in 1886, gained in popularity. In 1886, when Atlanta and Fulton County passed prohibition legislation, pharmacist John Pemberton responded by developing Coca-Cola. It was essentially a non-alcoholic version of the popular French wine coca. The first sales were at Jacob's Pharmacy in Atlanta, on May 8, 1886. It was initially sold as a patent medicine for five cents a glass at soda fountains, which were popular in the United States at the time due to the belief that carbonated water was good for the health. In 1887, Asa Griggs Candler bought the cola company from Pemberton, and with aggressive regional, national and international marketing turned it into one of the largest and most profitable corporations in the New South. Candler was later elected Mayor of Atlanta, taking office immediately after the passage of Georgia's state-wide prohibition law of 1915. He served from 1916 to 1919. Atlanta's first airport, Candler Field was named in his honor. Candler Field was subsequently renamed Atlanta Hartsfield-Jackson International Airport.

=== Social tension ===
Georgia took the national spotlight, in 1915, with the lynching of Atlanta Jewish factory superintendent Leo Frank. Frank had been convicted, in 1913, of the murder of a white Irish Catholic employee, thirteen-year-old Mary Phagan. After Frank's death sentence was commuted to life in prison by the outgoing Governor, an outraged lynch mob seized Frank from his jail cell and hanged him. Ringleaders calling themselves 'The Knights of Mary Phagan' included prominent politicians, most notably former Governor Joseph Mackey Brown. Publisher Thomas E. Watson was accused of helping to instigate the violence, through inflammatory newspaper coverage.

The rising social tensions from new immigration, urban migration and rapid change contributed to revival of the Ku Klux Klan. On November 25, 1915, a group led by William J. Simmons burned a cross on top of Stone Mountain, inaugurating a revival of the 2nd Klan. The event was attended by 15 charter members and a few aging survivors of the original Klan. Atlanta was designated as its Imperial City. The Klan quickly grew to occupy a powerful role in both state and municipal politics. Governor Clifford Walker, who served from 1923 to 1927, was closely associated with the Klan. By the end of the decade, the organization suffered from a number of scandals, internal feuds, and voices raised in opposition. Klan membership in the state declined from a peak of 156,000 in 1925 to 1,400 in 1930.

=== Women's suffrage ===
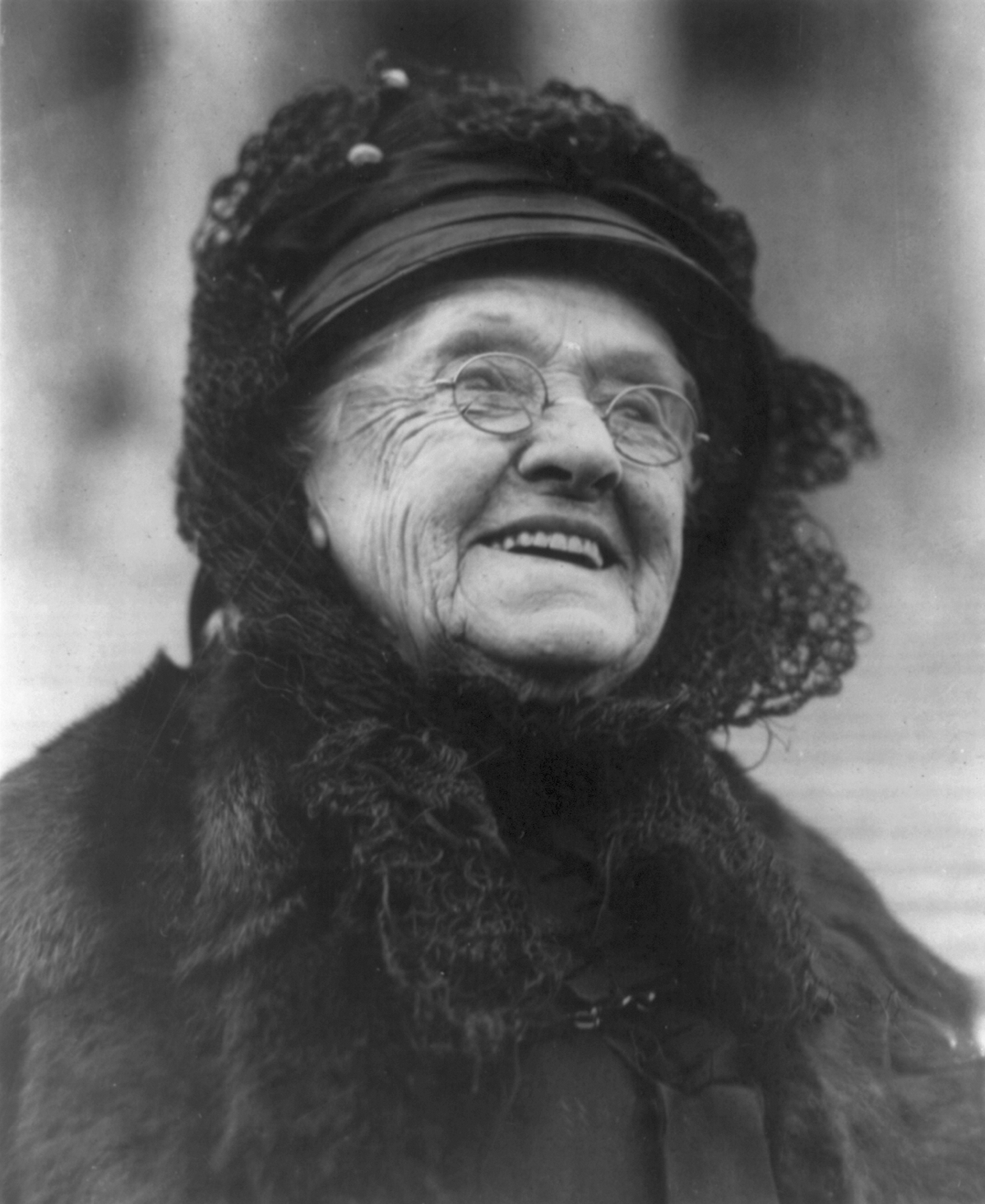
Rebecca Latimer Felton, former Georgia senator and first woman to serve in U.S. Senate

Rebecca Latimer Felton (1835–1930) was the most prominent woman leader in Georgia. Born into a wealthy plantation family, she married an active politician, managed his career, and became a political expert. An outspoken feminist, she became a leader of the prohibition and woman's suffrage movements, endorsed lynching, fought for reform of prisons, and filled leadership roles in many reform organizations. In 1922, she was appointed to the U.S. Senate. She was sworn in on November 21, 1922, and served one day. She was the first woman to serve in the Senate.

Although middle-class urban women were well-organized supporters of suffrage, the rural areas were hostile. The state legislature ignored efforts to let women vote in local elections, and not only refused to ratify the Federal Nineteenth Amendment, but took pride in being the first state to reject it. The Amendment passed nationally and Georgia women gained the right to vote in 1920. However, black women were largely excluded from voting by the state's discriminatory devices until after the federal Voting Rights Act of 1965 enforced their constitutional rights.

=== Great Depression and Second World War ===
The state was relatively prosperous in the 1910s. The price of cotton remained high, until the end of World War I. Lower wholesales prices in the 1920s had a negative impact on the rural economy, which, in turn, effected the entire state. By 1932, economic recession had deteriorated into a severe depression. Cotton prices decreased from a high of $1.00 a pound during World War I, to $.20 inches (51 cm) the late 1920s, to lows of 6 cents in 1931 and 1932. The Great Depression proved to be difficult, economically, for both rural and urban Georgia. Farmers and blue-collar workers were impacted the most. Georgia benefited from several New Deal programs, which raised cotton prices to $.11 or $.12 a pound, promoted rural electrification, and set up rural and urban work relief programs. Enacted during Roosevelt's first 100 days in office, the Agricultural Adjustment Act paid farmers to plant less cotton, to reduce oversupply. Between 1933 and 1940, the New Deal injected $250 million into the Georgia economy. Franklin Delano Roosevelt visited Georgia on numerous occasions. He established his 'Little White House' in Warm Springs, where the therapeutic waters offered treatment and relief for the President's paralytic illness.

Roosevelt's proposals were popular with many members of Georgia's congressional delegation. The Civilian Conservation Corps put young men, formerly on relief, back to work. The Agricultural Adjustment Administration supported the price of cotton and peanuts. Work relief programs spread federal money across the state. However, the most powerful member of the Georgia delegation, Congressman Eugene Cox, often opposed legislation which favored labor and urban interests, particularly the National Industrial Recovery Act.

Georgia's powerful governor Eugene Talmadge (1933–37) disliked Roosevelt and the New Deal. He was a former Agriculture Commissioner who promoted himself as a 'real dirt farmer', winning the support of his rural constituencies. Talmadge opposed many New Deal programs. Appealing to his white conservative base, Talmadge denounced New Deal programs that paid black workers wages equal to whites, and attacked what he described as the communist tendencies of the New Deal. The Roosevelt administration was often able to circumvent Talmadge's opposition by working with pro-New Deal politicians, most notably Atlanta Mayor William B. Hartsfield. In the 1936 election, Talmadge unsuccessfully attempted to run for the Senate, but lost to pro-New Deal incumbent Richard Russell, Jr. The candidate he endorsed for Governor was also defeated. Under the pro-New Deal administration of State House speaker E.D. Rivers, by 1940 Georgia led the nation in the number of Rural Electrification Cooperatives and rural public housing projects. Between 1933 and the early 1940s the administration of Franklin D Roosevelt spent slightly over $250 million on projects in Georgia for projects such as malaria control, rural sanitation, hot lunches for school children, nursing services and art projects.

Re-elected Governor in 1940, Talmadge suffered a political setback when he fired a dean at the University of Georgia, on the grounds that the dean had advocated integration. When this action was opposed by the Georgia Board of Regents, Governor Talmadge reconfigured the board, appointing members more favorable to his views. This, in turn, led the Southern Association of Colleges and Schools to withdraw accreditation from ten of the state's colleges and universities. In 1942, Talmadge was defeated in his bid for reelection. However, he was reelected in 1946, but died before taking office. The death of the Governor-elect precipitated a political crisis known as the three governors controversy, which was only resolved after a legal ruling by the Georgia Supreme Court.

Factory production during World War II lifted Georgia's economy out of recession. Marietta's Bell Aircraft plant, the principal assembly site for the Boeing B-29 Superfortress bomber, employed nearly 28,000 people at its peak, Robins Air Field near Macon employed nearly 13,000 civilians; Fort Benning became the world's largest infantry training school; and newly opened Fort Gordon became a major deployment center. Shipyards in Savannah and Brunswick built many of the Liberty Ships used to transport materiel to the European and Pacific Theaters. Following the cessation of hostilities, the state's urban centers continued to thrive.

In 1946, Georgia became the first state to allow 18-year-olds to vote, and remained the only one to do so before passage of the 26th Amendment in 1971. (Three other states set the voting age at 19 or 20.) That same year, the Communicable Disease Center, later called the Centers for Disease Control and Prevention (CDC) was founded in Atlanta from staff of the former Malaria Control in War Areas offices.

From 1946 to 1955, some 500 new factories were constructed in the state. By 1950, more Georgians were employed in manufacturing than farming. At the same time, the mechanization of agriculture dramatically reduced the need for farm laborers. This precipitated another wave of urban migration, as former sharecroppers and tenant farmers moved chiefly to the urban Midwest, West and Northeast, as well as to Georgia's own burgeoning urban centers.

During the war, Atlanta's Candler Field was the nation's busiest airport in terms of flight operations. Afterwards Mayor Hartsfield lobbied successfully to make the city Delta Air Lines' hub for commercial air travel, based on Atlanta's strategic location in relation to the nation's major population centers. The airport was subsequently renamed, in his honor.

== Civil rights movement ==
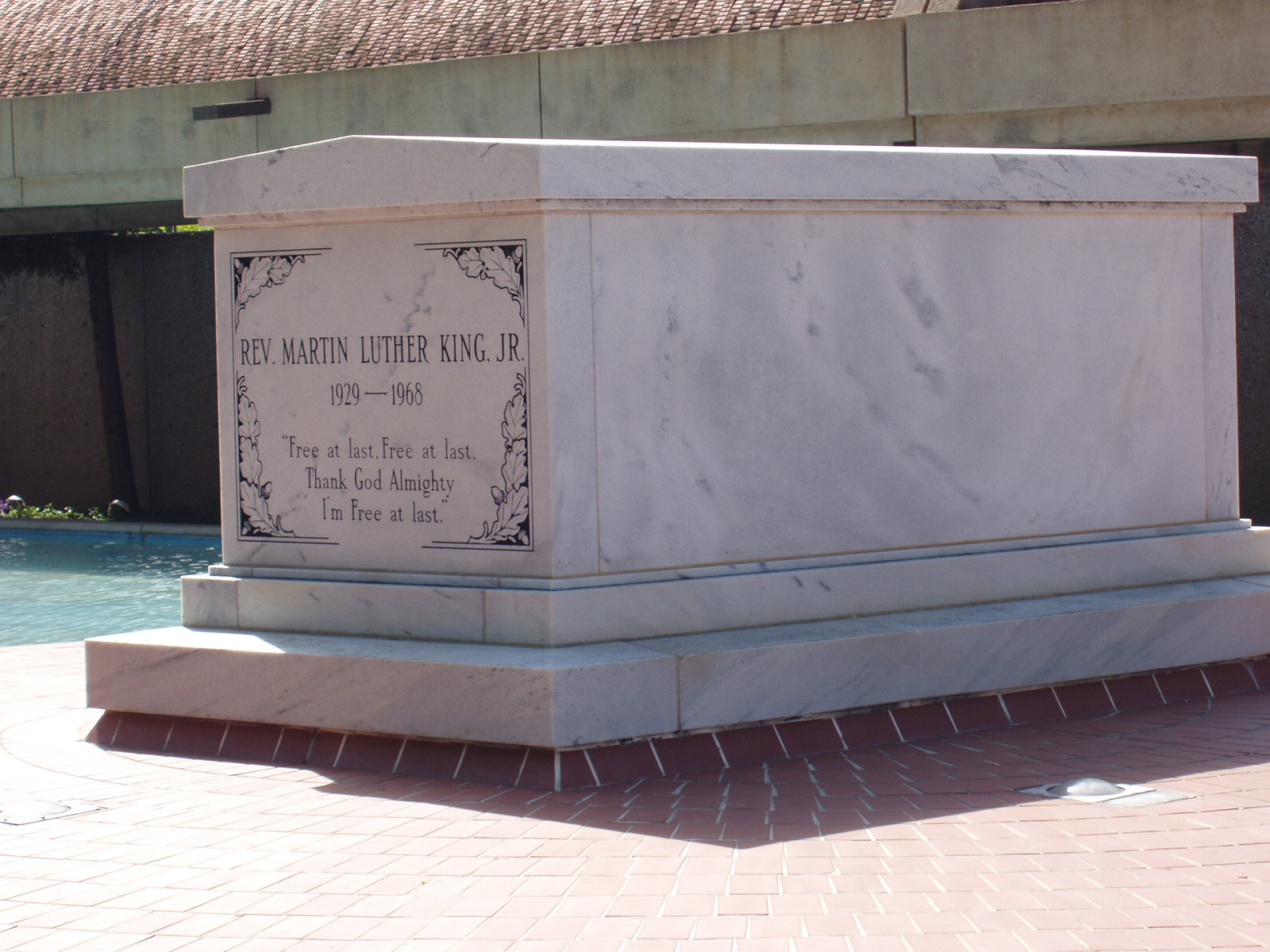
Martin Luther King Jr.'s tomb, located on the grounds of the King Center for Nonviolent Social Change

African Americans who served in the segregated military during World War II returned to a still segregated nation and a South which still enforced Jim Crow laws. Many were motivated to participate in the NAACP and other groups to enforce their constitutional rights, especially the right to vote, and the right of their children to an equal education. Following the 1946 U.S. Supreme Court decision in Smith v. Allwright, which overturned white primaries, NAACP activists worked to register voters. Statewide, 135,000 blacks registered to vote in 1946, and 85,000 did vote.

Atlanta, home to a number of traditional black colleges, sustained a large, educated, middle-class black community which produced leaders of the Civil Rights Movement. In the postwar period, the new movement for change was carried forward by several groups, with somewhat different agendas, but united in the goal of civil rights for African Americans. The voting rights campaign in Atlanta was spearheaded by the All Citizen's Registration Committee.

The idea of change was not universally embraced. The Supreme Court's decision in Brown v. Board of Education (1954) was denounced by Governor Marvin Griffin, who pledged to keep Georgia's schools segregated, "come hell or high water".

In January 1956, Bobby Grier became the first black player to participate in the Sugar Bowl. He is also regarded as the first black player to compete at a bowl game in the Deep South, though others such as Wallace Triplett had played in games like the 1948 Cotton Bowl in Dallas. Grier's team, the Pittsburgh Panthers, was set to play against the Georgia Tech Yellow Jackets. However, Georgia's Governor Marvin Griffin beseeched Georgia Tech's president Blake Van Leer and its players to not participate in this racially integrated game. Griffin was widely criticized by news media leading up to the game, and protests were held at his mansion by Georgia Tech students. After delivering a commencement speech at the all-Black Morris Brown College, Van Leer was summoned by the board of regents where he was quoted

Either we’re going to the Sugar Bowl or you can find yourself another damn president of Georgia Tech.

Despite the governor's objections, Georgia Tech upheld the contract and proceeded to compete in the bowl. In the game's first quarter, a pass interference call against Grier ultimately resulted in Yellow Jackets' 7–0 victory. Grier stated that he has mostly positive memories about the experience, including the support from teammates and letters from all over the world.

In 1958 the state passed legislation to restrict voter registration by requiring illiterate candidates to answer 20 of 30 questions of comprehension posed by white registrars. In practice, it was used subjectively to disqualify blacks. In rural counties such as Terrell, black voting registration was repressed. After the legislation, although the county was 64% black in population, only 48 blacks managed to register to vote.

Atlanta-born minister, Martin Luther King Jr., emerged as a national leader in the Montgomery bus boycott of 1955 in Alabama. The son of a Baptist minister, King earned a doctorate from Boston University and was part of the educated middle class that had developed in Atlanta's African-American community. The success of the Montgomery boycott led to King's joining with others to form the Southern Christian Leadership Conference (SCLC) in Atlanta in 1957, to provide political leadership for the Civil Rights Movement across the South. Black churches had long been important centers of their communities. Ministers and their thousands of congregations throughout the South were at the forefront of the civil rights struggle.

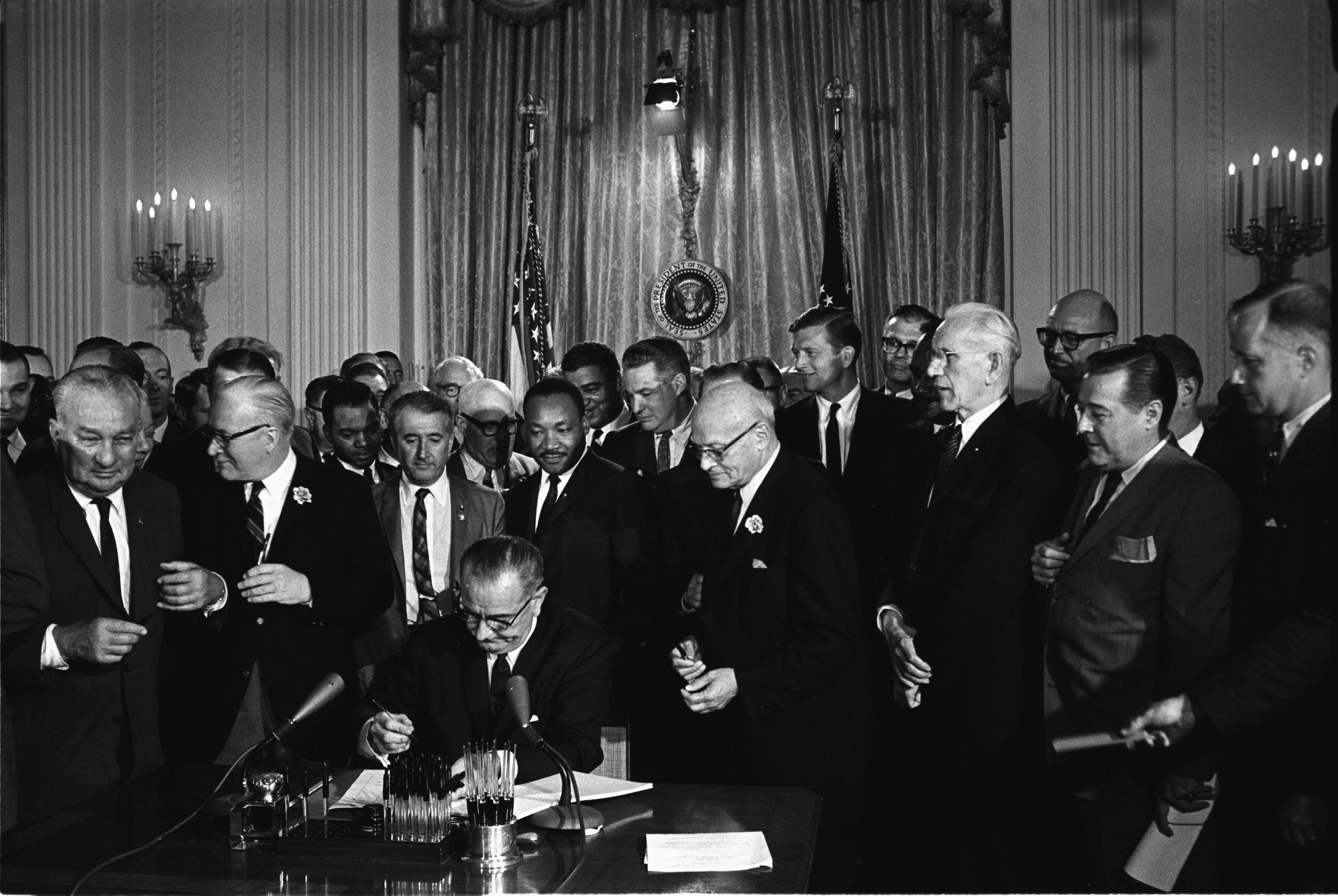
U.S. president Lyndon B. Johnson signs the Civil Rights Act of 1964

The SCLC led a desegregation campaign in Albany, Georgia in 1961. This campaign, however, failed to rally significant support or to achieve any dramatic victories. Nonetheless the Albany campaign provided important lessons, which were put to use in the more successful Birmingham campaign of 1963–64 in Alabama. National opinion eventually turned in favor of the moral position of civil rights for all citizens. Before his assassination, President John F. Kennedy prepared and submitted a Civil Rights bill to Congress. Kennedy's successor, Lyndon B. Johnson, made the legislation a priority in his administration. In 1964, President Johnson secured passage of the Civil Rights Act. The following year he secured passage of the Voting Rights Act of 1965.

African Americans throughout the South registered to vote and began to re-enter the political process. By the 1960s, the proportion of African Americans in Georgia had declined to 28% of the state's population, after waves of migration to the North and some in-migration by whites. With their voting power diminished, it took some years for African Americans to win a state-wide office. Julian Bond, a noted civil rights leader, was elected to the state House in 1965, and served multiple terms there and in the state senate.

Atlanta Mayor Ivan Allen, Jr. testified before Congress in support of the Civil Rights Act, and Governor Carl Sanders worked with the Kennedy administration to ensure the state's compliance. Ralph McGill, editor and syndicated columnist at the Atlanta Constitution, earned both admiration and enmity by writing in support of the Civil Rights Movement. However, the majority of white Georgians continued to oppose integration.

In 1966, Lester Maddox was elected Governor of Georgia. Maddox, who opposed forced integration, had gained fame by threatening African-American civil rights demonstrators who tried to enter his restaurant. After taking office, Maddox appointed more African Americans to positions of responsibility than any governor since Reconstruction.

In 1969, the U.S. Department of Justice filed a successful lawsuit against Georgia, requiring the state to integrate public schools. In 1970, newly elected Governor Jimmy Carter declared in his inaugural address that the era of racial segregation had ended. In 1972 Georgians elected Andrew Young to Congress as the first African American since Reconstruction.

== Late 20th century to present ==
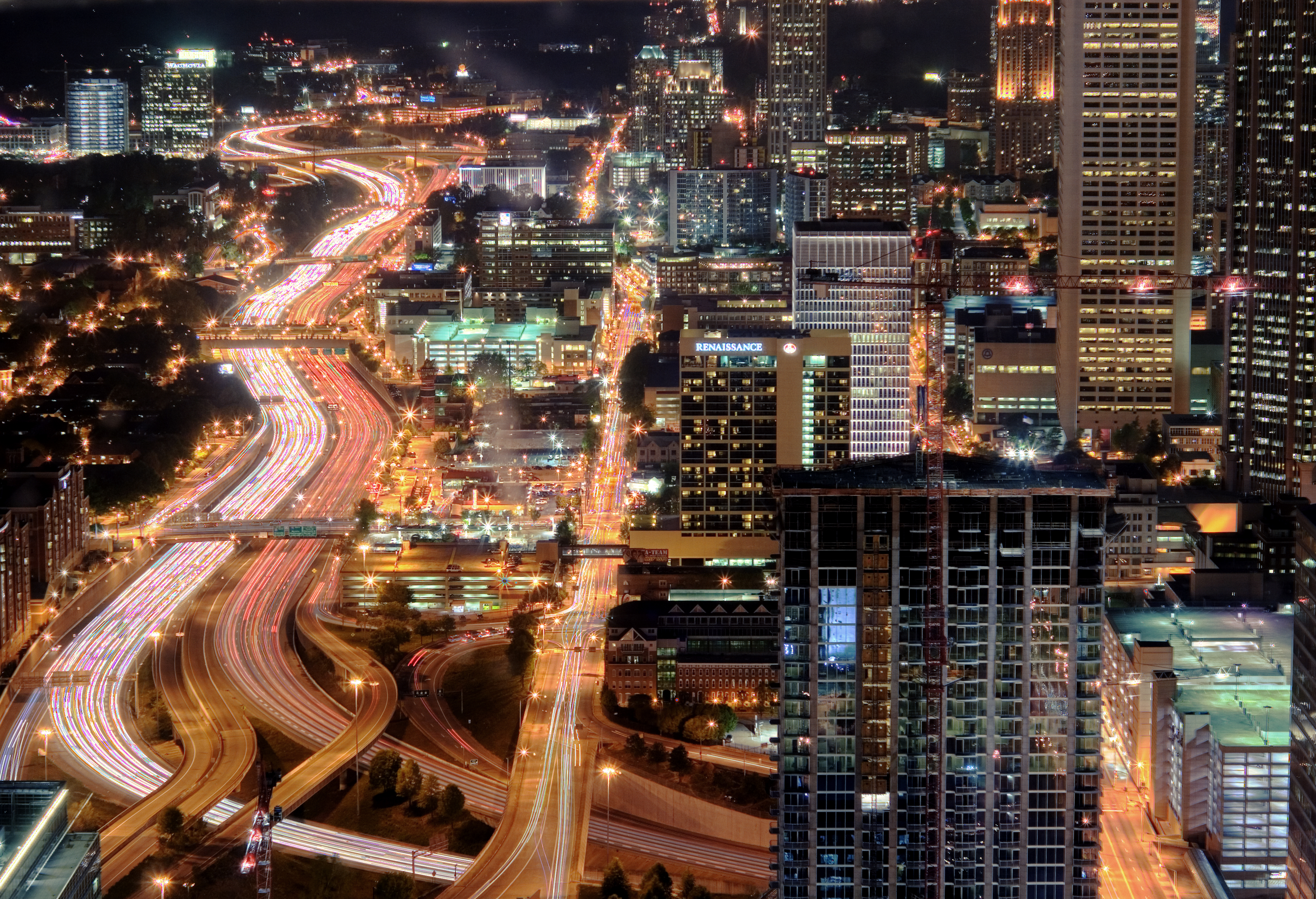
The Atlanta Downtown Connector seen at night in Midtown (2007)

In 1980, construction was completed on an expansion of William B. Hartsfield International Airport. The busiest in the world, it was designed to accommodate up to 55 million passengers a year. The airport became a major engine for economic growth. With the advantages of cheap real estate, low taxes, right-to-work laws and a regulatory environment limiting government interference, the Atlanta metropolitan area became a national center of finance, insurance, and real estate companies, as well as the convention and trade show business. As a testament to the city's growing international profile, in 1990 the International Olympic Committee selected Atlanta as the site of the 1996 Summer Olympics. Taking advantage of Atlanta's status as a transportation hub, in 1991 UPS established its headquarters in a suburb. In 1992, construction finished on Bank of America Plaza, it was the tallest building in the U.S. outside New York or Chicago at the time of its completion.

Following national Democratic support for civil rights legislation, Georgia, along with the rest of the formerly Democratic Solid South, gradually shifted to support Republicans, first in presidential elections. Realignment was hastened by the turbulent one-term presidency of native-son Jimmy Carter, the popularity of Ronald Reagan, organizational efforts of the Republican Party, and the perception of a growing liberalism within the national Democratic Party. While Carter would prevail in the state in both his 1976 and 1980 campaigns, and another southern governor, Bill Clinton, would win the state in 1992, Republicans increasingly held the upper hand in presidential politics from the mid-1960s onward.

As the era of old south Democratic control, symbolized by iconic personalities Herman Talmadge and Georgia Speaker of the House Tom Murphy drew to an end, new Republican leaders took their place. Republican congressman Newt Gingrich, the acknowledged leader of the Republican Revolution, was elected Speaker of the House. His seat represented the northern suburbs of Atlanta. Bob Barr, another Georgia Republican congressman, was a leader of the campaign to impeach President Bill Clinton in 1998.

In this shifting political climate, many leading Georgia Democrats, most notably Governor Zell Miller (1990–99), drifted to the right. After being appointed to the U.S. Senate by his successor, Roy Barnes, following the death of early state GOP standard-bearer Paul Coverdell in 2000, Miller emerged as a prominent ally of George W. Bush on the war in Iraq, Social Security privatization, tax cuts, and other conservative-backed issues. He delivered a controversial keynote speech at the 2004 Republican convention where he endorsed Bush for reelection and denounced the liberalism of his Democratic Party colleagues. In a pattern common across the region, other white Democrats retired or switched parties as Democrats' fortunes declined with white voters, including future Republican governors Sonny Perdue and Nathan Deal.

In 2002, Georgia elected Perdue as the first Republican governor since Reconstruction, defeating Barnes. Shortly thereafter, Republicans gained control of both chambers of the state legislature and all state-wide elected offices. CNN reported that in 2008 presidential election exit polls, 39% of the voters identified as conservatives; 48% moderates and 13% liberals. 37% identified as "White Evangelical/Born-Again," and they voted 89% for Republican John McCain, who carried the state's electoral votes. The other 63% voted two-to-one for Democrat Barack Obama, the first African American to be elected as president. In 2012 and 2016, Republicans continued to prevail in Georgia, with nominees Mitt Romney and Donald Trump carrying the state in those elections; Romney lost nationally to Obama, while Trump won the electoral college vote and thus the presidency against former U.S. senator, secretary of state, and first lady Hillary Clinton.

Signs the Republicans might be losing their grip on the state began to appear in the state's 2018 elections. While the governor's office remained in Republican hands (Brian Kemp, then the state's secretary of state, avoided a potential run-off against an African American woman, former state house minority party leader Stacey Abrams, by just 17,488 votes), in the state legislature they fared more poorly: Republicans lost eight seats in the Georgia House of Representatives (winning 106), while Democrats gained ten (winning 74); in the Georgia Senate, Republicans lost two seats (winning 35 seats), while Democrats gained two seats (winning 21). In congressional races that year, Democrats also posted a gain when five Democratic U.S. Representatives were elected with Republicans winning nine seats (one winning with just 419 votes over the Democratic challenger, and one seat being lost).

Democrats made a major breakthrough in 2020, when Georgians narrowly backed a Democratic presidential candidate, Joe Biden, who was the first to prevail in the state since Bill Clinton in 1992. Biden won Georgia's electoral college vote over incumbent GOP president Donald Trump by 12,670 votes, on his way to a national electoral college victory. Continuing the Democratic trend in early 2021, challengers Jon Ossoff and Raphael Warnock successfully won run-off elections against Republican incumbents to become the first Democrats to represent the state in the U.S. Senate in 18 years.

The 2022 Georgia state elections saw a rebound for the Republican Party with almost all Statewide offices going Republican. Raphael Warnock did win re-election to the senate and was the only Democrat to win a statewide office in 2022. In the 2024 United States presidential election in Georgia, Donald Trump narrowly won the state, solidifying Georgia as a swing state.

== See also ==
- Flags of Georgia
- Yazoo Land Fraud
- Black Belt in the American South
- Deep South
- History of the Southern United States
- Georgia Historical Society
- List of historical societies in Georgia (U.S. state)
- Timeline of Georgia
- History of Atlanta
- Timeline of Atlanta
- Augusta, Georgia
- Timeline of Savannah, Georgia
- History of slavery in Georgia (U.S. state)
