= Outline of Georgia (U.S. state) =

U.S. state

The flag of Georgia

The seal of Georgia

The location of the state of Georgia in the United States of America

The following outline is provided as an overview of and topical guide to the U.S. state of Georgia:

Georgia – ninth most populous of the 50 states of the United States of America. Georgia borders the North Atlantic Ocean in the Southeastern United States. Georgia was the fourth of the original 13 states to approve the Constitution of the United States of America on January 2, 1788. Georgia joined the Confederate States of America during the American Civil War from 1861 to 1865, and was readmitted to the Union in 1870.

== General reference ==
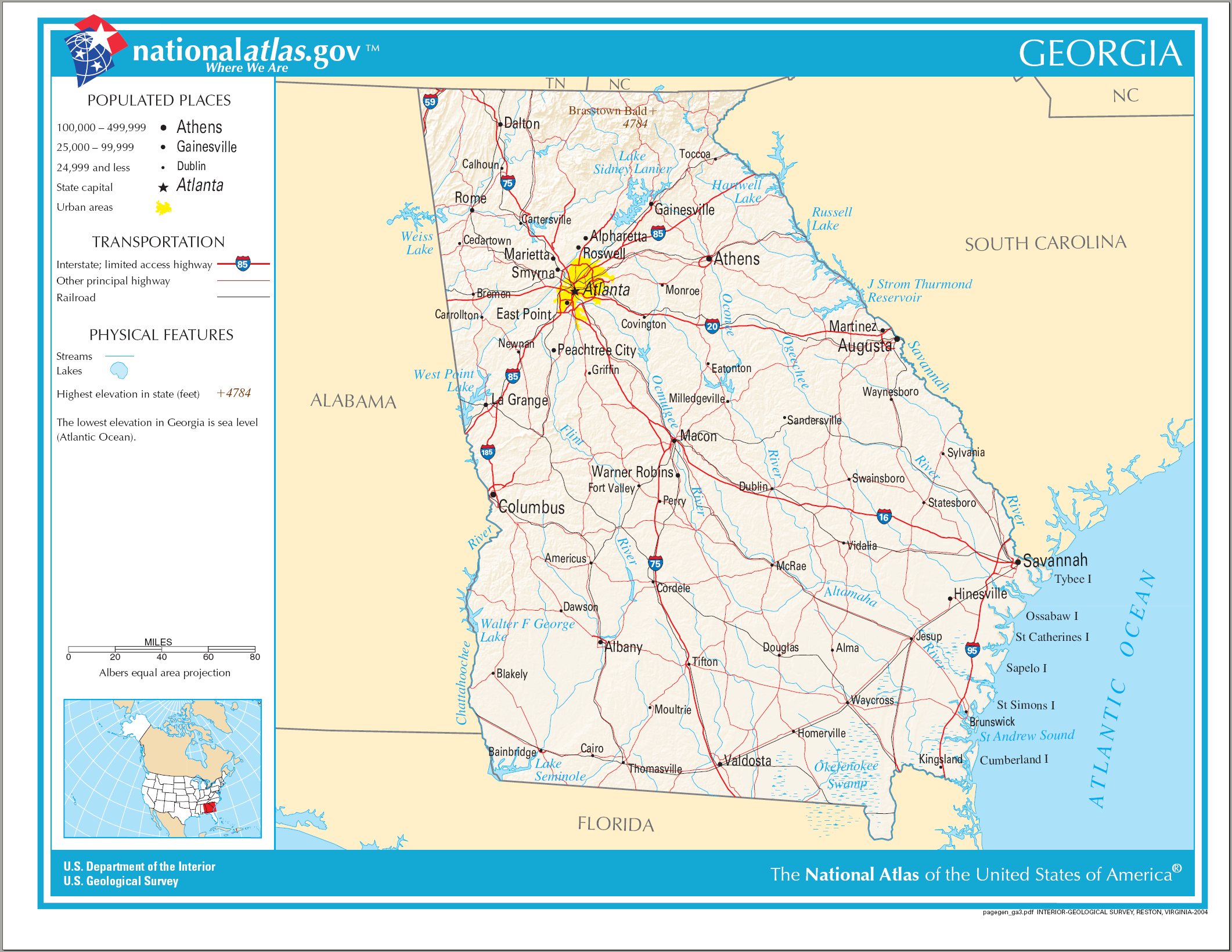
An enlargeable map of the state of Georgia

- Names
  - Common name: Georgia
    - Pronunciation: /ˈdʒɔːrdʒə/ JOR-jə
  - Official name: State of Georgia
  - Abbreviations and name codes
    - Postal symbol: GA
    - ISO 3166-2 code: US-GA
    - Internet second-level domain: .ga.us
  - Nicknames
    - Peach State (previously used on license plates)
    - Empire State of the South — Refers to economic leadership
    - Yankee-land of the South: Similarly to the above nickname, "Yankee-land of the South" speaks to industrial and economic development in the south. This nickname may be used in a derogatory sense.
    - Goober State — Refers to peanuts, the official state crop.
- Adjectivals: Georgia
- Demonym: Georgian

== Geography of Georgia ==
- Georgia (U.S. state) is: a U.S. state, a federal state of the United States of America
- Location
  - Northern Hemisphere
  - Western Hemisphere
    - Americas
      - North America
        - Anglo America
        - Northern America
          - United States of America
            - Contiguous United States
              - Eastern United States
                - East Coast of the United States
                - Southeastern United States
                - South Atlantic States
              - Southern United States
                - Deep South
- Population of Georgia (U.S. state): 10,711,908 (2020 U.S. Census)
- Area of Georgia (U.S. state): 59,420 sq mi (153,910 km^{2})
- Atlas of Georgia (U.S. state)

=== Places in Georgia ===
- Historic places in Georgia (U.S. state)
  - Abandoned communities in Georgia (U.S. state)
  - Ghost towns in Georgia (U.S. state)
  - National Historic Landmarks in Georgia (U.S. state)
  - National Register of Historic Places listings in Georgia (U.S. state)
    - Bridges on the National Register of Historic Places in Georgia (U.S. state)
- National Natural Landmarks in Georgia
- National parks in Georgia
- State parks in Georgia (U.S. state)

=== Environment of Georgia ===
- Climate of Georgia (U.S. state)
- Natural history of Georgia (U.S. state)
- Geology of Georgia (U.S. state)
- Protected areas in Georgia (U.S. state)
  - National Wildlife Refuges in Georgia (U.S. state)
  - State forests of Georgia (U.S. state)
- Superfund sites in Georgia (U.S. state)
- Wildlife of Georgia (U.S. state)
  - Flora of Georgia (U.S. state)
    - List of trees of Georgia (U.S. state)
  - Fauna of Georgia (U.S. state)
    - Birds of Georgia (U.S. state)
    - Mammals of Georgia (U.S. state)
    - Reptiles
      - Snakes of Georgia (U.S. state)
    - Insects
      - Butterflies of Georgia (U.S. state)

==== Natural geographic features of Georgia ====
- Rivers of Georgia (U.S. state)

=== Administrative divisions of Georgia ===
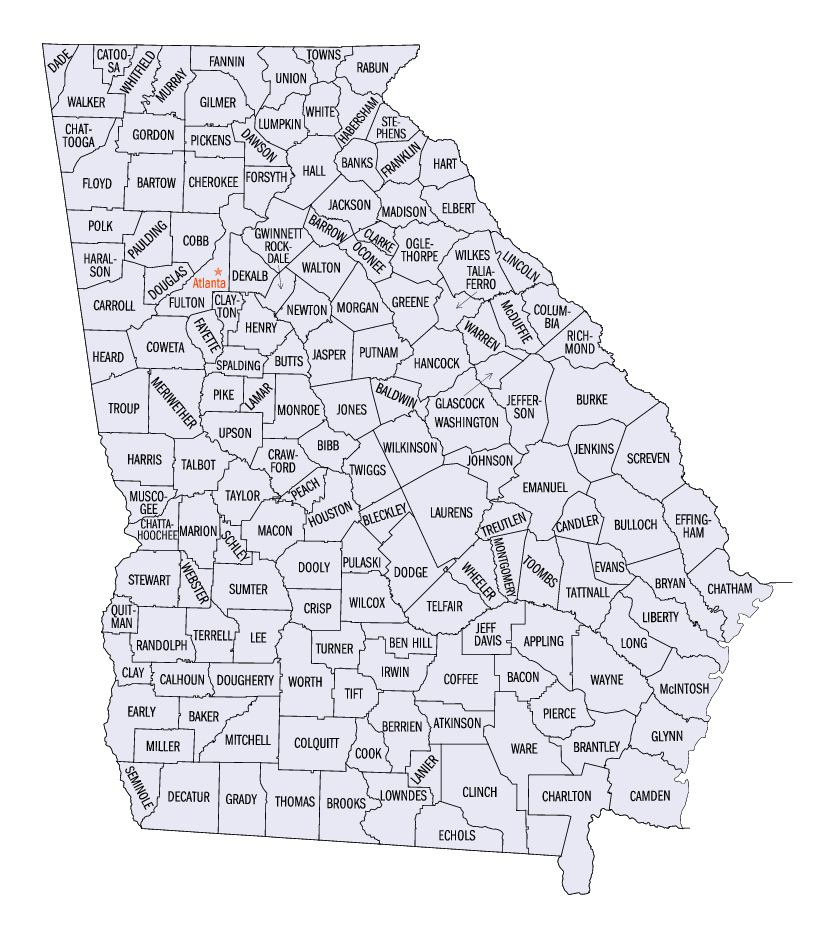
An enlargeable map of the 159 counties of the state of Georgia

- The 159 counties of the state of Georgia
  - Municipalities in the state of Georgia
    - Cities in the state of Georgia
      - Capital of the state of Georgia: Atlanta
      - City nicknames in the state of Georgia
      - Sister cities of the state of Georgia
    - Towns in the state of Georgia
    - Unincorporated communities in the state of Georgia
  - Census-designated places in the state of Georgia

== Government and politics of Georgia ==
- Form of government: U.S. state government
- Georgia's congressional delegations
- Georgia State Capitol
- Elections in Georgia (U.S. state)
  - Electoral reform in Georgia (U.S. state)
- Political party strength in Georgia (U.S. state)

=== Branches of the government of Georgia ===
==== Executive branch of the government of Georgia ====
- Governor of Georgia (U.S. state)
  - Lieutenant Governor of Georgia (U.S. state)
  - Secretary of State of Georgia
  - Georgia State Treasurer
- State departments
  - Georgia (U.S. state) Department of Transportation

==== Legislative branch of the government of Georgia ====
- Georgia General Assembly (bicameral)
  - Upper house: Georgia Senate
  - Lower house: Georgia House of Representatives

==== Judicial branch of the government of Georgia ====
Courts of Georgia

- Supreme Court of Georgia

=== Law and order in Georgia ===
- Adoption in Georgia (U.S. state)
- Cannabis in Georgia (U.S. state)
- Capital punishment in Georgia (U.S. state)
  - Individuals executed in Georgia (U.S. state)
- Constitution of Georgia (U.S. state)
- Crime in Georgia (U.S. state)
  - Organized crime in Georgia (U.S. state)
- Gun laws in Georgia (U.S. state)
- Law enforcement in Georgia (U.S. state)
  - Law enforcement agencies in Georgia (U.S. state)
    - Georgia (U.S. state) State Police
  - Prisons in Georgia (U.S. state)
- Same-sex marriage in Georgia (U.S. state)

=== Military in Georgia ===
- Georgia Air National Guard
- Georgia National Guard

== History of Georgia ==
- History of Georgia
- Timeline of Georgia

=== History of Georgia, by period ===
The location of the state of Georgia in the United States of America

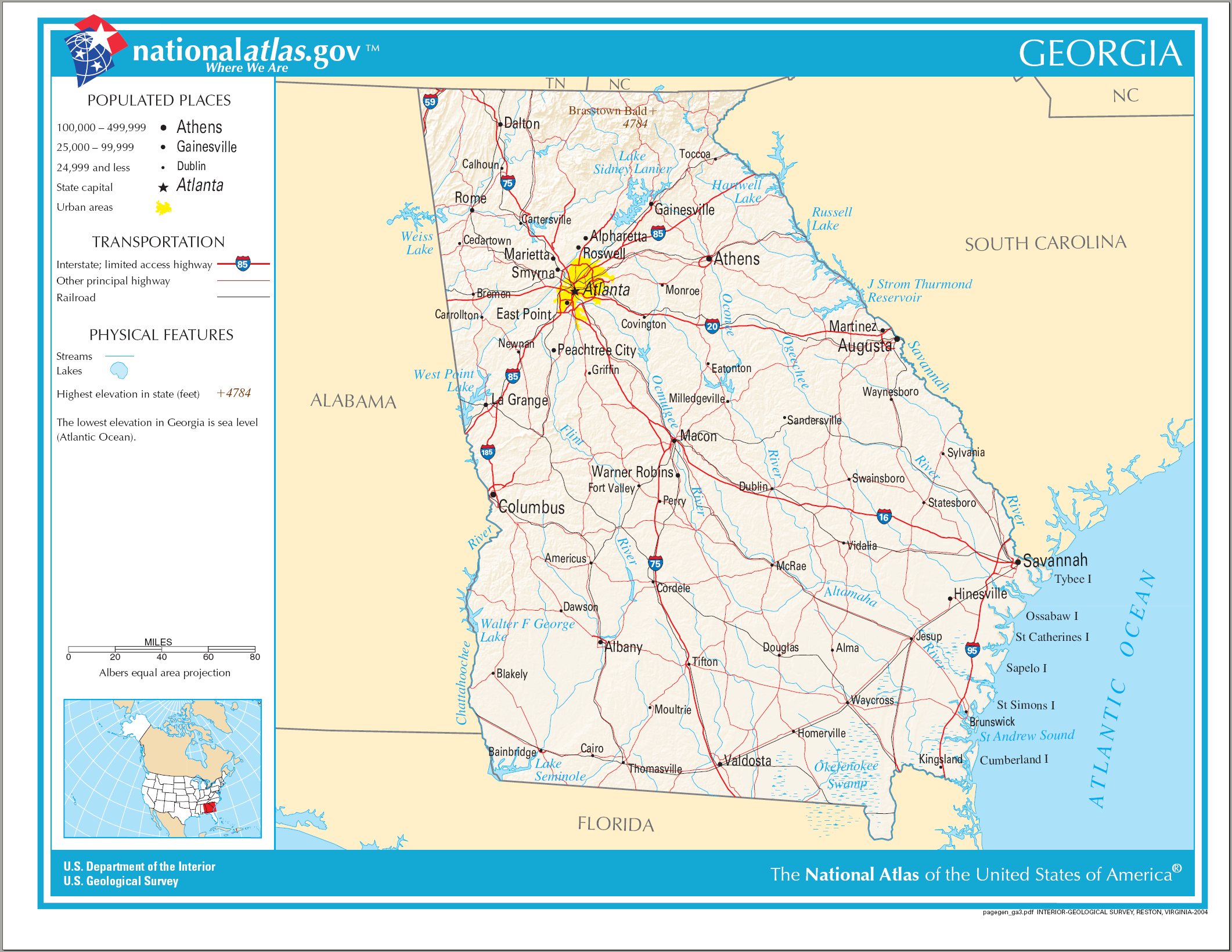
An enlargeable map of the state of Georgia

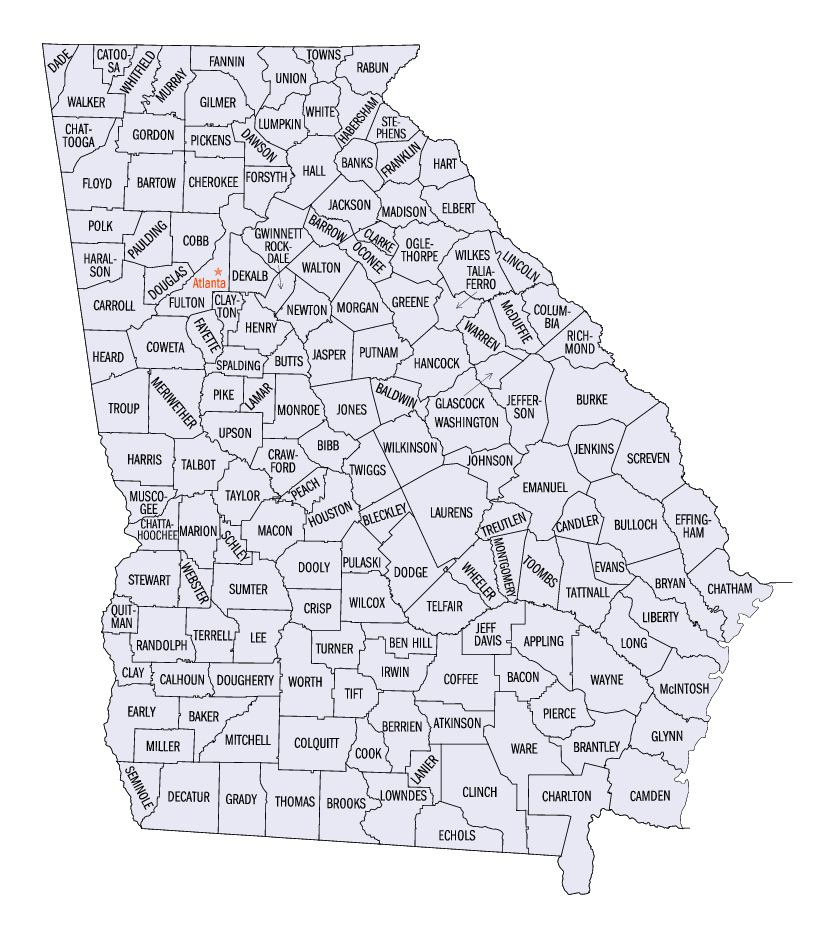
An enlargeable map of the 159 counties of the state of Georgia

- Prehistory of the state of Georgia
- Spanish colony of Florida, 1565–1763
- French colony of Louisiane, 1699–1763
- British Colony of Georgia, 1732–1755
  - History of slavery in Georgia
- King George's War, 1739–1748
  - Treaty of Aix-la-Chapelle of 1748
- French and Indian War, 1754–1763
  - Treaty of Fontainebleau of 1762
  - Treaty of Paris of 1763
- British Province of Georgia, 1755–1776
- British Indian Reserve, 1763–1783
  - Royal Proclamation of 1763
- American Revolutionary War, April 19, 1775 – September 3, 1783
  - Georgia in the American Revolution
  - United States Declaration of Independence, July 4, 1776
  - Treaty of Paris, September 3, 1783
- State of Georgia, since 1776
    - Fifth state to ratify the Articles of Confederation and Perpetual Union, signed July 9, 1778
  - Cherokee–American wars, 1776–1794
  - Fourth State to ratify the Constitution of the United States of America on January 2, 1788
  - Treaty of San Lorenzo of 1795
  - Western territorial claims sold 1802
  - War of 1812, June 18, 1812 – March 23, 1815
    - Treaty of Ghent, December 24, 1814
  - Creek War, 1813–1814
  - Trail of Tears, 1830–1838
  - Mexican–American War, April 25, 1846 – February 2, 1848
    - Fifth state to declare secession from the United States of America on January 19, 1861
    - Founding state of the Confederate States of America on February 8, 1861
  - American Civil War, April 12, 1861 – May 13, 1865
    - Georgia in the American Civil War
      - Battle of Chickamauga, September 19–20, 1863
      - Atlanta campaign, May 7 – September 2, 1864
        - Battle of Atlanta, July 22, 1864
      - Franklin–Nashville Campaign, October 5 – December 25, 1864
      - Sherman's March to the Sea, November 15 – December 21, 1864
  - Georgia during Reconstruction, 1865–1870
      - Eleventh former Confederate state readmitted to the United States of America on July 15, 1870
  - Civil Rights Movement from December 1, 1955, to January 20, 1969
    - Martin Luther King Jr. awarded Nobel Peace Prize on December 10, 1964
  - Jimmy Carter becomes 39th President of the United States on January 20, 1977

=== History of Georgia, by region ===
- History of Atlanta
- History of Augusta, Georgia
- History of Brunswick, Georgia
- History of Savannah, Georgia

=== History of Georgia, by subject ===
- List of Georgia state legislatures
- History of marriage in Georgia (U.S. state)
- Natural history of Georgia (U.S. state)
- History of slavery in Georgia (U.S. state)
- History of universities in Georgia
  - History of Georgia Tech
  - History of North Georgia College and State University

== Culture of Georgia ==
- Cuisine of Georgia (U.S. state)
- Museums in Georgia (U.S. state)
- Religion in the State of Georgia
  - The Church of Jesus Christ of Latter-day Saints in Georgia (U.S. state)
  - Episcopal Diocese of Georgia (U.S. state)
  - Georgia District Church of the Nazarene
- Scouting in Georgia (U.S. state)
- State symbols of Georgia
  - Flag of the State of Georgia (Georgia (U.S. state))
  - Great Seal of the State of Georgia

=== The arts in Georgia ===
- Music of Georgia (U.S. state)
- Theater in Georgia (U.S. state)

=== Sports in Georgia ===
- Professional sports teams in Georgia (U.S. state)

== Economy and infrastructure of Georgia ==
- Communications in Georgia (U.S. state)
  - Newspapers in Georgia (U.S. state)
  - Radio stations in Georgia (U.S. state)
  - Television stations in Georgia (U.S. state)
- Energy in Georgia (U.S. state)
- Health care in Georgia (U.S. state)
  - Hospitals in Georgia (U.S. state)
- Transportation in Georgia (U.S. state)
  - Bicycle routes in Georgia (U.S. state)
  - Airports in Georgia (U.S. state)
  - Rail transport in Georgia (U.S. state)
  - Roads in Georgia (U.S. state)
    - U.S. Highways in Georgia (U.S. state)
    - Interstate Highways in Georgia (U.S. state)
    - State highways in Georgia (U.S. state)
- Water in Georgia (U.S. state)

== Education in Georgia ==
- Schools in Georgia (U.S. state)
  - School districts in Georgia (U.S. state)
    - High schools in Georgia (U.S. state)
  - Private schools in Georgia (U.S. state)
  - Colleges and universities in Georgia (U.S. state)
    - University of Georgia
    - Georgia Institute of Technology
    - University of West Georgia

== See also ==
- Topic overview:
  - Georgia (U.S. state)
  - Index of Georgia (U.S. state)-related articles
