= Zach Zebrowski =

American football player (born 2001)

Athens Crush
- Position: Quarterback
- CFL status: American

Personal information
- Born: June 8, 2001 (age 25); Decatur, Illinois, U.S.
- Listed height: 6 ft 2 in (1.88 m)
- Listed weight: 208 lb (94 kg)

Career information
- High school: East Ridge (Woodbury, Minnesota)
- College: Southern Illinois (2019–2022); Central Missouri (2023–2024)
- NFL draft: 2025: undrafted

Career history
- Edmonton Elks (2025); Athens Crush (2027–)

Awards and highlights
- 2× Harlon Hill Trophy (2023, 2024); 2× AP First Team All-American (2023); 2× AFCA First Team All-American (2023, 2024); First Team All-MIAA (2023, 2024)

Zach Zebrowski (born June 8, 2001) is an American professional football quarterback currently playing for the Athens Crush of the Indoor Football League. He previously played for the Southern Illinois Salukis and Central Missouri Mules, where he won the Harlon Hill Trophy for the 2023 and 2024 seasons.

== College career ==
=== Southern Illinois ===
Zebrowski committed to play college football for Southern Illinois University.

In 2019, Zebrowski redshirted.

In 2020, Zebrowski appeared in one game against South Dakota State. He completed two of his five pass attempts for twelve yards.

In 2021, Zebrowski appeared in two games: Dayton and South Dakota State. He completed one pass for eight yards alongside one carry for two yards against Dayton and recorded no stats against South Dakota State.

In 2022, Zebrowski was the team's backup and appeared in four games. On the season he completed four of his five passes for 31 yards and his first-career touchdown. Against Incarnate Word he completed all three of his pass attempts for 33 yards and his lone touchdown. In that game he also tallied 31 rushing yards on two carries. Following the season, he announced he would enter the transfer portal.

=== Central Missouri ===
In 2023, Zebrowski transferred to the University of Central Missouri. He played and started all thirteen of the team's games and lead them to an 11–2 record. In his first game against Missouri Western, he threw for 390 yards and five touchdowns. He threw multiple touchdown passes in every single game of the season, including eight against Emporia State. He led the Mules to a 9–1 conference record which earned them a share of the conference championship alongside Pittsburg State. In the first round of the playoffs, the team beat Henderson State 56–14, as Zebrowski threw for 467 yards and seven touchdowns. Against Harding he threw for 425 yards and five touchdowns despite losing by a single point to the eventual champions 35–34. Following the season he was named First Team All-MIAA and was named as the winner of the Harlon Hill Trophy.

=== Statistics ===
Year	Team	Games		Passing								Rushing			
Year	Team	GP	Record	Comp	Att	Pct	Yards	Avg	TD	Int	Rate	Att	Yards	Avg	TD
2019	Southern Illinois	DNP													
2020	Southern Illinois	1	—	2	5	40.0	12	6.0	0	0	60.2	1	0	0.0	0
2021	Southern Illinois	2	—	1	1	100.0	8	8.0	0	0	167.2	1	2	2.0	0
2022	Southern Illinois	4	—	4	5	80.0	37	9.3	1	0	208.2	2	31	15.5	0
2023	Central Missouri	13	11–2	417	602	69.3	5,157	8.6	61	5	173.0	101	533	5.3	2
2024	Central Missouri	12	9–3	372	553	67.3	4,724	8.5	40	12	158.6	132	599	4.5	10
Career		32	20−5	796	1,166	68.3	9,938	8.5	102	17	165.8	237	1,165	4.9	12

== Professional career ==
After going undrafted in the 2025 NFL draft, Zebrowski was invited to rookie mini-camp on a tryout basis with the Minnesota Vikings.

On December 22, 2025, the Edmonton Elks of the Canadian Football League signed Zebrowski. He was released on May 31, 2026, as part of final roster cuts.

On October 14, 2026, the Athens Crush of the Indoor Football League signed Zebrowski.

== Personal life ==
Zebrowski's dad, Jim, is the offensive coordinator and quarterbacks coach for the University of Kansas and was the head football coach for Lakeland College—now Lakeland University.
