= Geography of Georgia =

Geography of Georgia may refer to:

- Geography of Georgia (country)
- Geography of Georgia (U.S. state)
