= Flora of Georgia =

Flora of Georgia may refer to:

- Flora of Georgia (country)
- Flora of Georgia (U.S. state)
