= Electoral reform in Georgia =

Electoral reform in Georgia may refer to:

- Electoral reform in Georgia (country)
- Electoral reform in Georgia (U.S. state)
