= List of professional sports teams in Georgia (U.S. state) =

Georgia is the eighth most populated state in the United States and has a rich history of professional sports.

== Active teams ==
=== Major league teams ===
Georgia is home to four major professional sports teams. Three of the teams are located in Atlanta and one of the teams is located in Cumberland, which is a suburb of Atlanta.

American football
League	Team	City	Stadium	Capacity
NFL	Atlanta Falcons	Atlanta	Mercedes-Benz Stadium	71,000
Baseball
League	Team	City	Stadium	Capacity
MLB	Atlanta Braves	Cumberland	Truist Park	41,108
Basketball
League	Team	City	Arena	Capacity
NBA	Atlanta Hawks	Atlanta	State Farm Arena	17,608
Soccer
League	Team	City	Stadium	Capacity
MLS	Atlanta United FC	Atlanta	Mercedes-Benz Stadium	42,500

=== Other professional sports teams ===
==== Men's leagues ====
Arena football
League	Team	City	Stadium	Capacity
AAL	Columbus Lions	Columbus	Columbus Civic Center	7,573
AAL	Rome Red Cats	Rome	Forum River Center	2,140
IFL	Athens Crush	Athens	Akins Ford Arena	5,600
IFL	Savannah Indoor Football	Savannah	Enmarket Arena	7,485
Baseball
League	Team	City	Stadium	Capacity
IL (AAA)	Gwinnett Stripers	Lawrenceville	Coolray Field	10,427
SL (AA)	Columbus Clingstones	Columbus	Synovus Park	5,500
SAL (High-A)	Rome Emperors	Rome	AdventHealth Stadium	5,105
Basketball
League	Team	City	Arena	Capacity
G-League	College Park Skyhawks	College Park	Gateway Center Arena	3,500
Ice hockey
League	Team	City	Arena	Capacity
ECHL	Atlanta Gladiators	Duluth	Gas South Arena	11,355
ECHL	Augusta Lynx	Augusta	New Augusta Arena	8,720
ECHL	Savannah Ghost Pirates	Savannah	Enmarket Arena	7,485
FPHL	Columbus River Dragons	Columbus	Columbus Civic Center	7,573
SPHL	Athens Rock Lobsters	Athens	Akins Ford Arena	5,500
SPHL	Macon Mayhem	Macon	Macon Coliseum	7,182
Lacrosse
League	Team	City	Arena	Capacity
NLL	Georgia Swarm	Duluth	Gas South Arena	10,500
Soccer
League	Team	City	Stadium	Capacity
MLSNP	Atlanta United 2	Kennesaw	Fifth Third Stadium	10,200
USL1	Tormenta FC	Statesboro	Tormenta Stadium	3,500
Ultimate
League	Team	City	Stadium	Capacity
UFA	Atlanta Hustle	Atlanta	Atlanta Silverbacks Park	5,000

==== Women's leagues ====
Arena football
League	Team	City	Arena	Capacity
X League	Atlanta Empire	Duluth	Gas South Arena	10,500
Basketball
League	Team	City	Arena	Capacity
WNBA	Atlanta Dream	College Park	Gateway Center Arena	3,500
UPSHOT	Savannah Steel	Savannah	Enmarket Arena	7,485
Soccer
League	Team	City	Stadium	Capacity
WPSL PRO	Georgia Impact	Canton	Tommy Baker Field	4,000
Ultimate Frisbee
League	Team	City	Arena	Capacity
PUL	Atlanta Soul	Decatur	Gellerstedt Field	N/A
Volleyball
League	Team	City	Arena	Capacity
LOVB	LOVB Atlanta	College Park	Gateway Center Arena	3,500
MLV	Atlanta Vibe	Duluth	Gas South Arena	12,750

=== Map of cities with a professional sports team ===
Location with a professional sports team

== See also ==
- Sports in Georgia
