= Regions of Georgia =

Regions of Georgia may refer to:

- Regions of Georgia (country)
- Regions of Georgia (U.S. state)

== See also ==
- Georgia (disambiguation)
