= Fauna of Georgia =

Fauna of Georgia may refer to:

- Fauna of Georgia (country)
- Fauna of Georgia (U.S. state)
