= Jim Zebrowski =

American football coach (born 1967)

Current position
- Title: Passing Game Coordinator coach & quarterbacks coach
- Team: Kansas
- Conference: Big 12

Biographical details
- Born: October 31, 1967 (age 58); Strongsville, Ohio, U.S.
- Education: University of Mount Union (1991); Southern Illinois University (2000)

Playing career
- 1987–1988: Mount Union
- Position: Quarterback

Coaching career (HC unless noted)
- 1991–1993: Preble Shawnee HS (OH) (OC/QB/OLB)
- 1994–1996: Berea HS (OH) (OC)
- 1997: Southern Illinois (GA)
- 1998: Southern Illinois (TE)
- 1999: Southern Illinois (QB/WR)
- 2000–2002: Millikin (OC/QB)
- 2003–2006: Lakeland
- 2007–2009: Wisconsin–Whitewater (OC/QB/WR)
- 2010: Northern Illinois (QB)
- 2011–2015: Minnesota (QB)
- 2016: Hamline (AHC/OC)
- 2017–2020: Buffalo (co-OC/QB)
- 2021–2023: Kansas (QB)
- 2023–2024: Kansas (co-OC/QB)
- 2025: Kansas (OC/QB)
- 2026-Present: Kansas (PGC/QB)

Head coaching record
- Overall: 29–12
- Tournaments: 0–1 (NCAA D-III playoffs)

Accomplishments and honors

Championships
- 2 IBFC (2004–2005)

James P. Zebrowski (born October 31, 1967) is an American college football coach. He is the passing game coordinator and quarterbacks coach for the University of Kansas. He was the head football coach for Lakeland College—now knows as Lakeland University—from 2003 to 2006. He also coached for Preble Shawnee High School, Berea High School, Southern Illinois, Millikin, Wisconsin–Whitewater, Northern Illinois, Minnesota, Hamline, and Buffalo. He played college football for Mount Union as a quarterback.

== Personal life ==
Zebrowski's son, Zach, plays football for the Edmonton Elks and was the 2023 and 2024 Harlon Hill Trophy winner.

== Head coaching record ==
Year	Team	Overall	Conference	Standing	Bowl/playoffs
Lakeland Muskies (Illini–Badger Football Conference) (2003–2006)
2003	Lakeland	8–2	6–1	2nd	
2004	Lakeland	8–2	6–1	T–1st	
2005	Lakeland	8–3	7–0	1st	L NCAA Division III First Round
2006	Lakeland	5–5	5–2	T–2nd	
Lakeland:		29–12	24–4		
Total:		29–12			
National championship Conference title Conference division title or championship game berth
