= College Hockey South =

US ice hockey conference

- Formerly: South Eastern Collegiate Hockey Conference (SECHC) [2008-2021]
- Conference: CHS
- Founded: 2022
- Commissioner: Kyle Knell (2022)
- Sports fielded: College ice hockey; men's: Yes; women's: Yes
- No. of teams: 28
- Region: Southeastern United States
- Website: CHS official website

College Hockey South (CHS), formerly known as the South Eastern Collegiate Hockey Conference (SECHC), is a non-varsity ice hockey conference in the Southern United States. The conference plays in Division 1, Division 2, and Division 3 and Women's Division of Amateur Athletic Union (AAU) College Hockey. The member clubs of College Hockey South are member universities of several different conferences in NCAA athletics.

On February 11, 2022, the South Eastern Collegiate Hockey Conference rebranded as College Hockey South.

== Teams ==
After the 2012–13 season Arkansas moved from the South Region of Division 3 to the Pacific Region but remained a member of the ACHA.

Following the 2014–15 season, both Arkansas and Alabama moved up to ACHA Division 1. Alabama discontinued their participation in the SECHC in 2015, but returned to the conference in 2021.

On January 2, 2023, College Hockey South announced the addition of a women's division beginning in the 2023-2024 season. The division will consist of women's teams from Auburn, Miami, South Florida, and Tampa as well as the teams of Georgia and South Carolina which are both currently being formalized.

=== Men's Division I ===
School	City	State	Founded	Joined	Affiliation	Enrollment	Nickname	Home arena
Auburn University	Auburn	Alabama	1856	2023-24	Public	25,379	Tigers	Columbus Ice Rink
University of Alabama	Tuscaloosa	Alabama	1831	2023-24	Public	32,458	Crimson Tide	Pelham Civic Center
University of Georgia	Athens	Georgia	1785	2023-24	Public	30,714	Bulldogs	Akins Ford Arena
University of Florida	Gainesville	Florida	1853	2008–09	Public	49,679	Ice Gators	Various
University of South Carolina	Columbia	South Carolina	1801	2023-24	Public	27,343	Gamecocks	Flight Adventure Park Irmo
University of Tampa	Tampa	Florida	1931	2023-24	Private	9,602	Spartans	Clearwater Ice Arena
University of Tennessee	Knoxville	Tennessee	1794	2008–09	Public	27,739	Ice Vols	Knoxville Civic Coliseum

=== Men's Division II ===
Division	School	City	State	Founded	Joined	Affiliation	Enrollment	Nickname	Home arena
North Division	University of Alabama in Huntsville	Huntsville	Alabama	1950	2018–19	Public	9,000	Chargers	Wilcoxon Ice Complex
North Division	Clemson University	Clemson	South Carolina	1889	2018–19	Public	24,387	Tigers	The Pavilion / Bon Secours Wellness Arena
North Division	Georgia Institute of Technology	Atlanta	Georgia	1885	2019-20	Public	28,000	Yellow Jackets	Atlanta Ice Forum
North Division	Middle Tennessee State University	Murfreesboro	Tennessee	1911	2018–19	Public	21,913	Blue Raiders	Ford Ice Center
North Division	University of Mississippi	Oxford	Mississippi	1848	2009–10	Public	23,838	Ice Rebels	Midsouth Icehouse
North Division	Vanderbilt University	Nashville	Tennessee	1873	2008–09	Private / Non-sectarian	13,537	Commodores	Ford Ice Center
South Division
South Division	Embry-Riddle Aeronautical University	Daytona Beach	Florida	1926	2022-23	Private	33,678	Eagles	Daytona Ice Arena
South Division	Florida Atlantic University	Boca Raton	Florida	1961	2019–20	Public	30,808	Owls	Florida Panthers Ice Den
South Division	Lynn University	Boca Raton	Florida	1962	2019–20	Private	3,000	Fighting Knights	Palm Beach Skate Zone
South Division	University of Central Florida	Orlando	Florida	1963	2022-23	Public	70,406	Knights	RDV Sportsplex
South Division	University of South Florida	Tampa	Florida	1956	2022-23	Public	50,830	Bulls	Florida Hospital Center Ice
South Division	University of Tampa	Tampa	Florida	1931	2022-23	Private	9,304	Spartans	Clearwater Ice Arena

=== Men's Division III ===
School	City	State	Founded	Joined	Affiliation	Enrollment	Nickname	Home arena
University of Alabama	Tuscaloosa	Alabama	1831	2023-24	Public	32,458	Crimson Tide	Pelham Civic Center
Eastern Kentucky University	Richmond	Kentucky	1906	2023-24	Public	12,072	Colonels	Lexington Ice Center
Embry-Riddle Aeronautical University	Daytona Beach	Florida	1926	2022-23	Private	33,678	Eagles	Daytona Ice Arena
University of Florida	Gainesville	Florida	1853	2008–09	Public	49,679	Ice Gators	Various
Florida Southern College	Lakeland	Florida	1883	2022-23	Private	30,808	Moccasins	Lakeland Ice Arena
Florida State University	Tallahassee	Florida	1851	2019–20	Public	45,493	Seminoles	Community First Igloo
Florida Institute of Technology	Melbourne	Florida	1958	2022-23	Private	9,316	Panthers	Space Coast Iceplex
University of North Florida	Jacksonville	Florida	1972	2023-24	Public	16,517	Ospreys	Community First Igloo
University of South Florida	Tampa	Florida	1956	2022-23	Public	50,830	Bulls	Florida Hospital Center Ice
Kennesaw State University	Kennesaw	Georgia	1963	2018–19	Public	35,000	Owls	The Cooler
University of Miami	Miami	Florida	1925	2022-23	Private	17,811	Hurricanes	Pines Ice Arena
University of Tennessee	Knoxville	Tennessee	1794	2022-23	Public	27,739	Volunteers	Knoxville Civic Coliseum

=== Women's Division ===
School	City	State	Founded	Joined	Affiliation	Enrollment	Nickname	Home arena
Auburn University	Auburn	Alabama	1856	2023-24	Public	25,379	Tigers	Columbus Ice Rink
University of Alabama	Tuscaloosa	Alabama	1831	2023-24	Public	32,458	Crimson Tide	Pelham Civic Center
University of Georgia	Athens	Georgia	1785	2023-24	Public	30,714	Bulldogs	Classic Center
University of South Carolina	Columbia	South Carolina	1801	2023-24	Public	27,343	Gamecocks	Flight Adventure Park Irmo
University of Miami	Miami	Florida	1925	2023-24	Private	12,504	Hurricanes	Kendall Ice Arena
University of South Florida	Tampa	Florida	1956	2023-24	Public	38,046	Bulls	Clearwater Ice Arena
University of Tampa	Tampa	Florida	1931	2023-24	Private	9,602	Spartans	Clearwater Ice Arena

=== Former members ===
School	City	State	Joined	Left	Conference left for	Current conference
Louisiana State University	Baton Rouge	Louisiana	2009–10	2017–18	Dropped team	
Mississippi State University	Starkville	Mississippi	2008–09	2017–18	Dropped team	

== Conference champions ==
The CHS Championship Tournament is held every year in February at the conclusion of the regular season and after the ACHA South Regionals. After the 2014–15 season the cross-divisional playoff format was abandoned. For the 2015–16 season there was just one division within CHS and the first round of the playoffs featured the #1 seed vs the #8 seed, the #2 seed vs the #7 seed, etc.

Year	Champion
2009	Tennessee
2010	Arkansas
2011	Arkansas
2012	Alabama
2013	Arkansas
2014	Arkansas
2015	Arkansas
2016	Georgia
2017	Georgia
2018	Arkansas
2019	Georgia
2020	Ole Miss
2021	Georgia
2022	Georgia
2023	Tampa

== Venues ==
Venues for the teams vary from community ice rinks to civic-center sized arenas. As the conference has expanded and interest in hockey has grown in the Southern United States teams have sought larger venues for games. The 2010-11 SECHC Championship Tournament was held at the 8,500 seat Columbus Civic Center. Two teams, Georgia and Florida along with in-state rivals Georgia Tech and Florida State, as well as a Thursday game played between in-state rivals South Carolina and Citadel play a yearly tournament at the Savannah Civic Center.

== ACHA Division 3 Nationals teams ==
CHS has sent 13 teams to the ACHA Division 3 National Tournament. While no CHS team has ever made it out of pool play, Arkansas in 2014 had the best success going 2-1 in their pool but losing the goals against tie breaker to the eventual champion Adrian College.

2009 Host City: Rochester, NY

- Tennessee (Finished 11th)

Hope College (L 3-5)
Colorado (W 7-6)
Dordt College (L 1-4)
Albany (W 6-5)

2010 Host City: Fort Myers, FL

- Florida (Finished 12th)

College of the Canyons (L 3-8)
Saginaw Valley State (L 1-14)
Robert Morris (W 8-6)

- Arkansas (Finished 13th)

Colorado (L 1-7)
Hope College (L 2-5)
Fredonia State (L 2-4)

2012 Host City: Vineland, NJ

- Alabama (Finished 16th)

California (PA) (L 3-7)
Hope College (L 1-9)
Cal State Northridge (L 6-7 OT)

2013 Host City: Springfield, MO

- Mississippi (Finished 13th)

Colorado State (W 2-1)
Farmingdale State (L 2-5)
Adrian College (L 0-9)

- Alabama (Finished 14th)

Iowa State (W 4-2)
California (PA) (L 5-7)
Michigan-Flint (L 1-7)

2014 Host City: Coral Springs, FL

- Arkansas (Finished 7th)

Adrian College (L 3-4)
Neumann (W 14-6)
Central Florida (W 6-2)

- Mississippi (Finished 15th)

California (PA) (L 2-8)
Davenport (L 2-10)
Aurora (L 3-9)

2015 Host City: Pelham, AL

- Arkansas (Finished 8th)

Fairfield (W 6-2)
Calvin College (W 9-2)
Florida Gulf Coast (L 1-6)

- Alabama (Finished 9th)

Michigan State (T 4-4)
Pittsburgh-Johnstown (W 6-1)
Colorado State, (L 6-7 OT)

- Mississippi (Finished 15th)

Oakland (L 4-7)
California (PA) (L 3-7)
Metro State (L 1-6)

2017 Host City: Columbus, OH

- Georgia (Finished 11th)

Oakland (L 6-7)
Bryn Athyn (L 1-6)
Missouri State (W 7-3)

2018 Host City: Columbus, OH

- Georgia (Finished 11th)

Nebraska (W 5-1)
Oakland (L 4-8)
Farmingdale State (L 7-3)

== See also ==
- American Collegiate Hockey Association
- List of ice hockey leagues
