= SS William F. Jerman =

World War II Liberty ship of the United States

History

United States
- Name: William F. Jerman
- Namesake: William F. Jerman
- Ordered: as type (EC2-S-C1) hull, MC hull 2393
- Builder: J.A. Jones Construction, Brunswick, Georgia
- Cost: $843,091
- Yard number: 178
- Way number: 2
- Laid down: 27 November 1944
- Launched: 23 December 1944
- Sponsored by: Mrs. Charles W. Tillett
- Completed: 31 December 1944
- Identification: Call Signal: ANEU
- Fate: Laid up in the National Defense Reserve Fleet, Wilmington, North Carolina, 4 November 1947; Sold for scrapping, 19 February 1960

General characteristics
- Class & type: Liberty ship; type EC2-S-C1, standard
- Tonnage: 10,865 LT DWT; 7,176 GRT
- Displacement: 3,380 long tons (3,434 t) (light); 14,245 long tons (14,474 t) (max)
- Length: 441 feet 6 inches (135 m) oa; 416 feet (127 m) pp; 427 feet (130 m) lwl
- Beam: 57 feet (17 m)
- Draft: 27 ft 9.25 in (8.4646 m)
- Installed power: 2 × Oil fired 450 °F (232 °C) boilers, operating at 220 psi (1,500 kPa); 2,500 hp (1,900 kW)
- Propulsion: 1 × triple-expansion steam engine, (manufactured by General Machinery Corp., Hamilton, Ohio); 1 × screw propeller
- Speed: 11.5 knots (21.3 km/h; 13.2 mph)
- Capacity: 562,608 cubic feet (15,931 m^{3}) (grain); 499,573 cubic feet (14,146 m^{3}) (bale)
- Complement: 38–62 USMM; 21–40 USNAG
- Armament: Varied by ship; Bow-mounted 3-inch (76 mm)/50-caliber gun; Stern-mounted 4-inch (102 mm)/50-caliber gun; 2–8 × single 20-millimeter (0.79 in) Oerlikon anti-aircraft (AA) cannons and/or, 2–8 × 37-millimeter (1.46 in) M1 AA guns

SS William F. Jerman was a Liberty ship built in the United States during World War II. She was named after William F. Jerman, who was lost at sea while he was the master of SS Cities Service Empire, that was torpedoed by German submarine U-128, 22 February 1942, off the East Coast.

== Construction ==
William F. Jerman was laid down on 27 November 1944, under a United States Maritime Commission (MARCOM) contract, MC hull 2393, by J.A. Jones Construction, Brunswick, Georgia; she was sponsored by Mrs. Charles W. Tillett, and launched on 23 December 1944.

== History ==
She was allocated to Black Diamond Steamship Co., on 31 December 1944. On 14 November 1947, she was laid up in the National Defense Reserve Fleet, in Wilmington, North Carolina. On 19 February 1960, she was sold for $70,161, to Bethlehem Steel, for scrapping. She was removed from the fleet on 26 April 1960.

== Bibliography ==
- "Jones Construction, Brunswick GA". ShipbuildingHistory.com. 13 October 2010.
- "Liberty Ships – World War II".
- Maritime Administration. "William F. Jerman". Ship History Database Vessel Status Card. U.S. Department of Transportation, Maritime Administration. Archived from the original on 12 December 2019.
- Davies, James (May 2004). "Specifications (As-Built)" (PDF). p. 23.
- "SS William F. Jerman".
