= Akins Ford Arena =

Indoor arena in Georgia, US

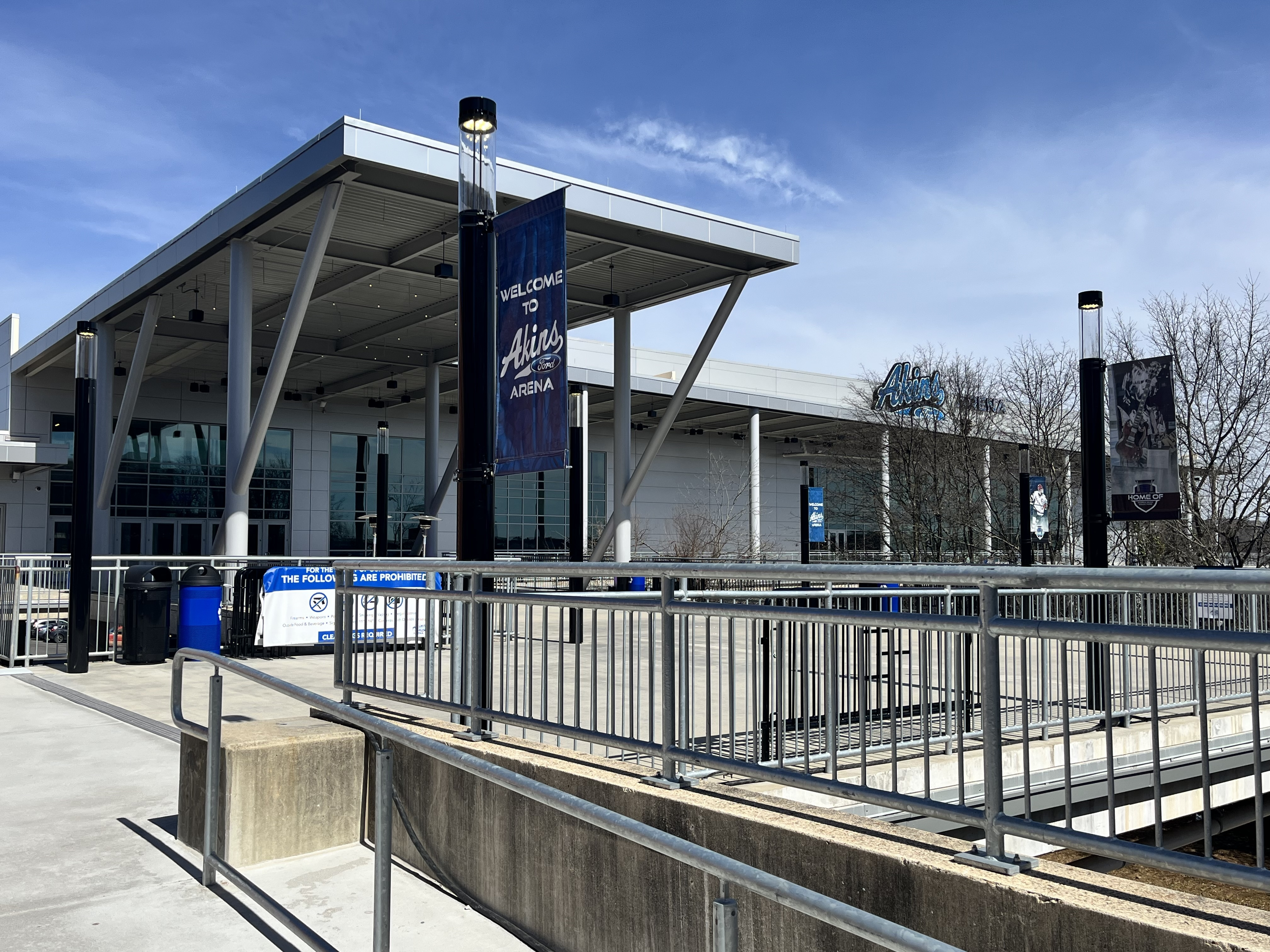
- Akins Ford Arena in 2026
- Interactive map of Akins Ford Arena
- Former names: Classic Center Arena (planning/construction)
- Address: 300 N Thomas Street
- Location: Athens, Georgia, U.S.
- Coordinates: 33°57′40.1″N 83°22′14.9″W
- Owner: Unified Government of Athens Clarke County
- Operator: Classic Center Authority
- Capacity: 8,500 (in the round concerts); 7,000 (end-stage concerts); 5,600 (hockey/indoor football)
- Public transit: Athens Transit at Athens Multimodal Transportation Center

Construction
- Groundbreaking: April 28, 2022
- Opened: December 13, 2024
- Cost: $146 million
- Architects: Perkins&Will and Smallwood, Reynolds, Stewart, Stewart
- Project manager: Impact Construction Management
- General contractor: J. E. Dunn Construction Group

Tenants
- Georgia Ice Dawgs (College Hockey South) (2024–present); Athens Rock Lobsters (SPHL) (2024–present); Athens Crush (IFL) (2027–present)

Website
- Venue Website

Akins Ford Arena is an indoor arena in Athens, Georgia. It is part of The Classic Center campus and was built as an upgrade to the Classic Center Grand Ballroom, which had been configured as a 2,000-seat arena. It is home to the UGA Ice Dawgs of the College Hockey South conference and to the Athens Rock Lobsters, a professional hockey team that began play on March 28, 2024 as an FPHL expansion franchise and announced a move to the SPHL starting with the 2026–27 season. In May 2026, the arena was also announced as the future home of an Indoor Football League expansion franchise, set to begin play in March 2027. It has a capacity of 8,500 for concerts and 5,600 for hockey and indoor football. It is owned by the Unified Government of Athens Clarke County.

== History ==
In January 2019, the Classic Center Authority announced their intent to construct the new Classic Center Arena adjacent to the existing site. The arena will be connected to the existing Classic Center, the Multimodal Transportation Center and the downtown district via a new elevated walkway. On August 20, 2024, it was announced that Akins Ford, of Winder, Georgia, had purchased the arena's naming rights for an undisclosed period and sum.

== Tenants ==
The Athens Rock Lobsters increased average attendance by 22 percent in their second FPHL season, to roughly 4,500 fans per game, before announcing on May 13, 2026 that they would join the SPHL as its 12th franchise, beginning with the 2026–27 season. On May 21, 2026, an Athens-based Indoor Football League expansion franchise, the league's 15th, was introduced at a kickoff event at the arena, with owners Jerome Bettis, David Pollack, and Brian Jordan in attendance alongside former Georgia coach Mark Richt. The franchise, the Athens Crush, is the first IFL team in Georgia and is scheduled to begin play at the arena in March 2027.
