= Electoral reform in Georgia (U.S. state) =

Electoral reform in Georgia refers to efforts to change the voting laws in the Peach State.

== Election processes ==
The County unit system was prevented by court order from use in the 1962, resulting in the election of Carl Sanders as the first governor from an urban area in decades. The system was fully abolished in 1963 in Gray v. Sanders.

== Racial and sex discrimination ==
The white primary was abolished in the 1946 case King v. Chapman.

On July 24, 1919, after Congress passed it, Georgia became the first state to reject the ratification of the Woman Suffrage Amendment with both houses passing resolutions against it. After Tennessee became the 38th and final state needed to ratify the amendment in August 1920, Georgia did not allow women to vote in the 1920 election, citing a requirement that one must be registered six months before the election in order to vote. After the state refused to pass an "enabling act" to expedite suffrage, women would not get to vote in Georgia elections until 1922. Georgia would not ratify the amendment until February 20, 1970.

== Expanding the electorate ==
All qualified voters are allowed to vote absentee under Georgia law.

== Referendum and initiative law ==
At the city, county and state levels, referendums are only allowed through the support of 2/3 of both houses of the General Assembly. Only legislatively-referred constitutional amendments are allowed to be voted on by statewide referendum. In addition, county and city referendums must obtain a majority support from the county's delegation to the General Assembly.
