= Athens Crush =

Future Indoor Football League team in Athens, Georgia

Logo

General information
- Founded: 2026
- Headquartered: Athens, Georgia at Akins Ford Arena
- Colors: Red, White, Gray, Midnight Blue
- Website: www.AthensCrush.com

Personnel
- Owners: Athens Sports Entertainment, LLC; Jerome Bettis; David Pollack; Brian Jordan
- Head coach: Rob Keefe

Home fields
- Akins Ford Arena (2027–present)

League / conference affiliations
- Indoor Football League (2027–present)

The Athens Crush are a professional indoor football team based in Athens, Georgia, that will compete in the Indoor Football League (IFL). The Crush will begin play in the 2027 season as an expansion team and will play their home games at Akins Ford Arena.

== History ==
In May 2026, the Classic Center and Akins Ford Arena announced that Athens had been awarded an Indoor Football League (IFL) expansion franchise, to be owned by a group including Jerome Bettis, David Pollack, and Brian Jordan. On May 21, 2026, the IFL held a press conference at Akins Ford Arena to officially announce the new team in Athens. The team became the first IFL franchise in the state of Georgia.

On June 26, 2026, the team announced Rob Keefe as its first head coach. On July 2, the team announced the four finalists for its nickname, allowing fans to vote for their preferred choice on the team's website. The finalists were Bullfrogs, Crush, Hedgehawgs, and Panic.

On August 26, 2026, the Crush unveiled their team name, logo and color scheme. In addition to representing energy, toughness and excitement, the name acknowledges the city's rich music heritage with a nod to one of the most popular songs to ever come out of Athens, "Orange Crush" by R.E.M. The team's logo, a capital A being crushed by a dinosaur claw, features the state of Georgia in the middle, as well as the iconic Athens/UGA Arch and a pair of musical notes hidden within the cracks.
