= Natural history of Georgia (U.S. state) =

The natural history of Georgia covers many plant and animal species. The humid subtropical climate of Georgia influences its plant and animal life.

== Flora ==
The state of Georgia has approximately 250 tree species and 58 protected plants. Georgia's native trees include red cedar, a variety of pines, oaks, maples, palms, sweetgum, scaly-bark and white hickories, as well as many others. Yellow jasmine, flowering quince, and mountain laurel make up just a few of the flowering shrubs in the state.

=== Tree species ===
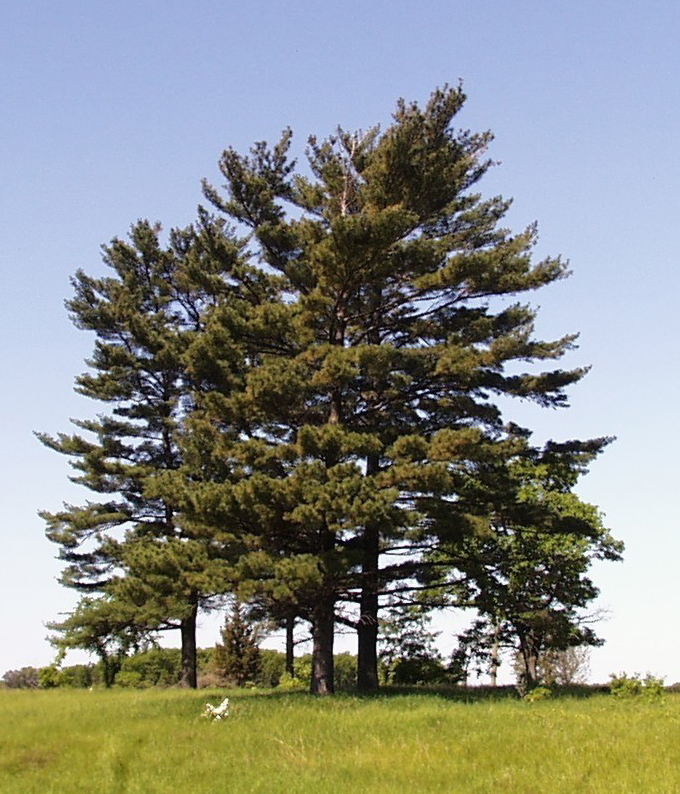
Eastern white pines

Georgia's approximately 250 tree species include red cedars and a medium-sized evergreen. These are found throughout Georgia and are very beneficial to many wildlife species. Specifically, the red cedar is a host plant for a variety of butterflies including the great purple hairstreak, the juniper hairstreak and the olive hairstreak. Among pine trees, the eastern white pine is found in North Georgia. Eastern white pines are typically 80 to 100 ft (24 to 30 m) tall. They are useful both to humans and wildlife in that they provide wood products for human use and seeds for many birds and animals as well as providing a nesting area for bald eagles. Most of central and south Georgia house the longleaf pine, a tree which can grow in excess of 100 feet (30 m) in height.

The live oak, Georgia's state tree, grows along the coast as well as certain wooded areas. The wood of the live oak is strong and heavy, but not often used. The acorns that grow on the tree are eaten by birds and animals. Sugar maples are found in Georgia. They can commonly grow above 100 feet (30 m) and are useful for a variety of products, from the making of maple syrup to the creation of household products. Needle palms, a variety of palm tree found near the Flint River in Georgia, reside in hardwood forests. The needle palm usually only reaches about 4 to 6 feet (120 to 180 cm) tall.

== Fauna ==
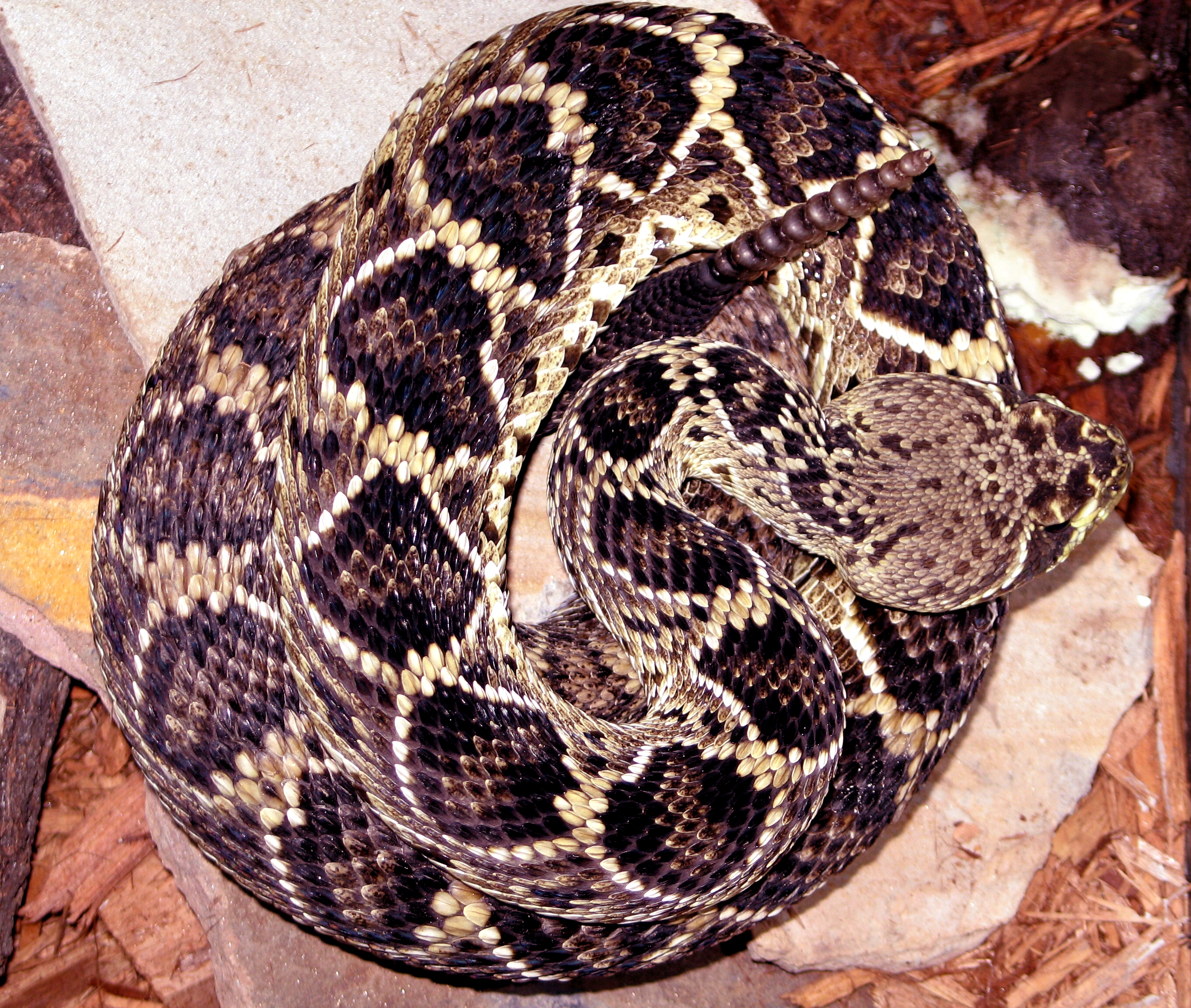
Diamondback rattlesnake

Regarding fauna, white-tailed deer can be found in approximately 50 counties. The mockingbird and brown thrasher are just two of the 347 bird species that can be found in the state. The eastern diamondback, copperhead, and cottonmouth as well as salamanders, frogs, and toads are among 79 species of reptile and 63 amphibians that make Georgia their home. The most popular freshwater game fish are trout, bream, bass, and catfish, all but the last of which are produced in state hatcheries for restocking. Dolphins, porpoises, whales, shrimp, oysters, and blue crabs are found off the coast.

=== On land ===
==== Mammals ====
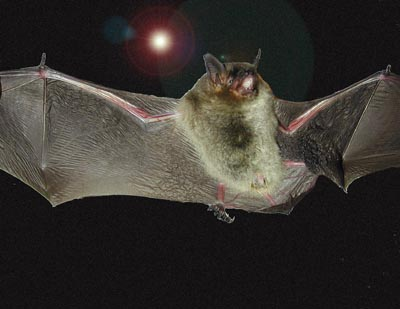
Gray bat

Georgia is home to more than ninety species of mammals. Many of those mammals who live on Georgia's land have been extirpated, that is they are no longer found in Georgia but exist in other areas. Examples of extirpated species are the bison and the red wolf. Many others are endangered, such as the gray bat and the Indiana bat.

==== Amphibians and reptiles ====
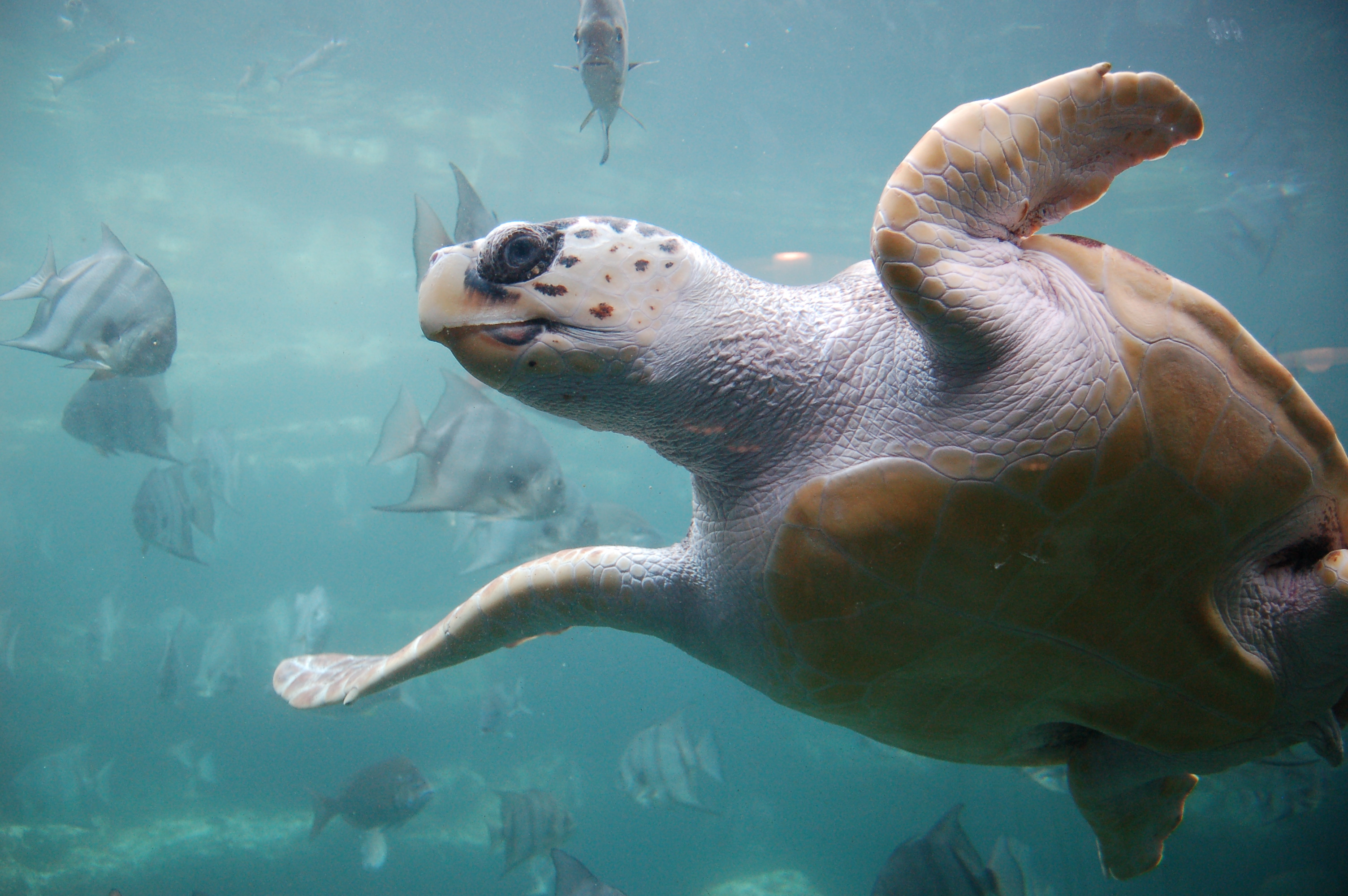
Loggerhead sea turtle

More than 150 species of amphibians and reptiles species live in Georgia, divided into approximately 80 species of amphibians and 70 species of reptiles. Of the amphibians, 50 are salamanders and 30 are frog species. Twenty-seven species of turtle and forty-one species of snake live in Georgia. Some of the amphibians and reptiles that are native to Georgia are the Pigeon Mountain salamander, the bullfrog, the loggerhead sea turtle and the rat snake.

=== Avifauna ===
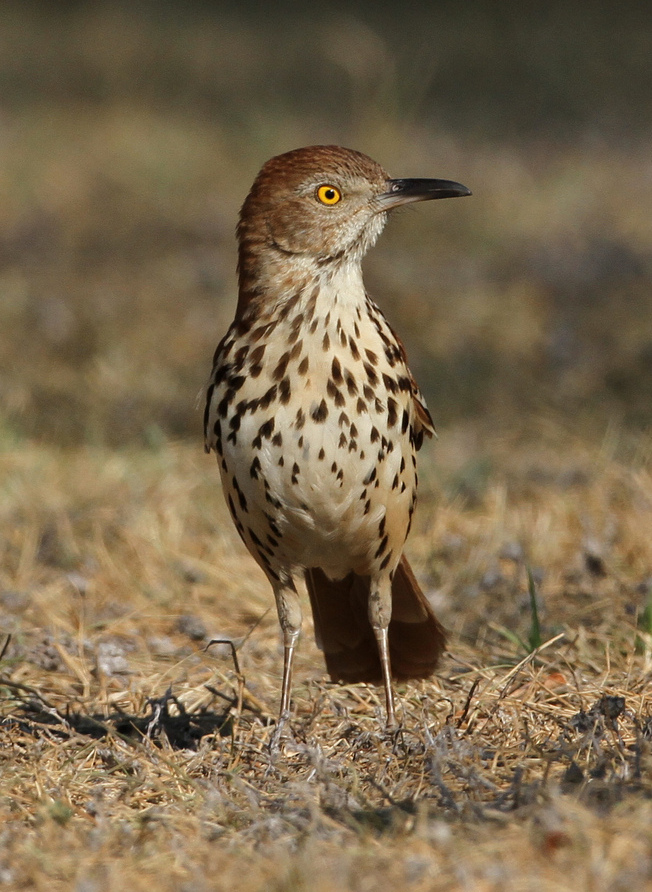
Brown thrasher

About 347 bird species make their home in Georgia. Many of these birds are migratory. These species are divided into four categories: permanent residents birds, summer-breeding birds, winter residents and spring/fall migrants. Species of birds in Georgia are the brown thrasher, Georgia's state bird and the northern bobwhite, the state gamebird.

== See also ==
- Environment of the United States
