= Geography of Georgia (U.S. state) =

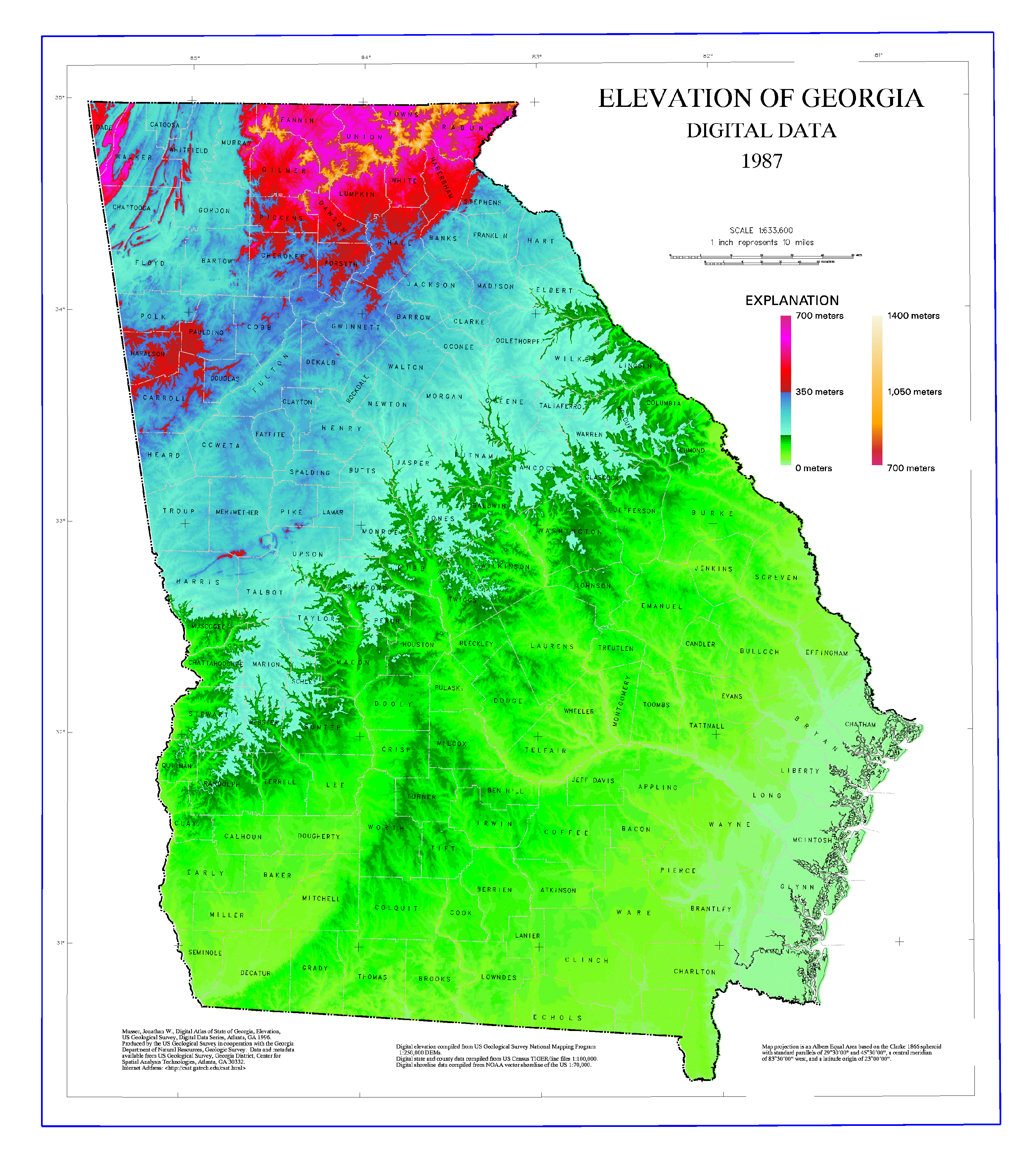
Map of Georgia elevations

Geography of Georgia (U.S. state)
Area
Total	153,870 km^{2} (59,410 sq mi)
Land	149,976 km^{2} (57,906 sq mi)
Water	854 sq mi (2,210 km^{2})
Latitude	30° 35′ N to 35° N
Longitude	80° 50′ W to 85° 36′ W
Borders
Florida	state
South Carolina	state
Alabama	state
Tennessee	state
North Carolina	state
Coastlines	100 miles

Georgia is a state in the Southeastern United States in North America. The Golden Isles of Georgia lie off the coast of the state. The main geographical features include mountains such as the Ridge-and-valley Appalachians in the northwest, the Blue Ridge Mountains in the northeast, the Piedmont plateau in the central portion of the state and Coastal Plain in the south. The highest area in Georgia is Brasstown Bald which is 1,458 m (4,783 ft) above sea level, while the lowest is at sea level, at the Atlantic Ocean. Georgia is located at approximately 33° N 83.5° W. The state has a total area of 154,077 km^{2} (59,489 sq mi) and the geographic center is located in Twiggs County.

Georgia has primarily a humid subtropical climate with hot and humid summers, except at the highest elevations. Georgia's subtropical climate depends on latitude and how close an area is to the Atlantic Ocean or the Gulf of Mexico. The state's weather is mostly moderate, but Georgia has occasional extreme weather. The highest temperature ever recorded is 112 °F (44 °C) and the lowest is −17 °F (−27 °C). Georgia is vulnerable to hurricanes, though the coast rarely experiences a direct hurricane strike.

Georgia has 536 cities in 159 counties and 14 congressional districts. 152 of the 159 counties in the state are governed by a commission of between three and eleven commissioners while the other seven are overseen by a single commissioner. Most of the 536 cities are governed by a mayor-council system. Georgia has almost eight million acres (32,000 km^{2}) of prime farmland while over 60% of the land is made up of pine forests. Georgia has 70,150 miles (112,900 km) of streams and rivers, 425,000 acres (1,720 km^{2}) of lakes, and approximately 4,500,000 acres (18,000 km^{2}) of freshwater wetlands. Manganese, iron, copper, and other minerals make up the natural resources of the state.

== Regions of Georgia ==
Source: Georgia Department of Economic Development

1. Northwest (Rome / Dalton) – Paulding, Bartow, Whitfield, Floyd, Catoosa, Walker, Gordon, Polk, Murray, Pickens, Gilmer, Haralson, Fannin, Chattooga, Dade
2. Northeast (Gainesville) – Forsyth, Hall, Habersham, Lumpkin, White, Dawson, Stephens, Hart, Union, Franklin, Banks, Rabun, Towns
3. Metro (Atlanta) – Fulton, Gwinnett, Cobb, DeKalb, Clayton, Cherokee, Henry, Douglas, Fayette, Rockdale
4. West Central (Newnan) – Coweta, Carroll, Troup, Spalding, Upson, Butts, Meriwether, Pike, Lamar, Heard
5. East Central (Athens) – Clarke, Newton, Walton, Barrow, Jackson, Oconee, Madison, Morgan, Elbert, Greene, Oglethorpe, Jasper
6. Middle (Macon / Warner Robins) – Houston, Bibb, Baldwin, Jones, Peach, Monroe, Putnam, Crawford, Pulaski, Wilkinson, Twiggs
7. East (Augusta) – Richmond, Columbia, Burke, McDuffie, Washington, Jefferson, Wilkes, Hancock, Jenkins, Lincoln, Warren, Glascock, Taliaferro
8. West (Columbus) – Muscogee, Harris, Sumter, Crisp, Macon, Dooly, Chattahoochee, Taylor, Marion, Randolph, Talbot, Stewart, Schley, Clay, Webster, Quitman
9. South (Dublin) – Laurens, Wayne, Toombs, Tattnall, Emanuel, Dodge, Appling, Jeff Davis, Bleckley, Telfair, Candler, Evans, Johnson, Wilcox, Montgomery, Wheeler, Treutlen
10. Southwest (Albany) – Dougherty, Colquitt, Thomas, Lee, Decatur, Grady, Mitchell, Worth, Early, Terrell, Seminole, Miller, Calhoun, Baker
11. Southeast (Valdosta) – Lowndes, Coffee, Tift, Ware, Pierce, Berrien, Brantley, Cook, Ben Hill, Brooks, Charlton, Bacon, Lanier, Irwin, Turner, Atkinson, Clinch, Echols
12. Coastal (Savannah) – Chatham, Glynn, Bulloch, Liberty, Effingham, Camden, Bryan, Long, Screven, McIntosh

== Physical geography ==
There are five major geographical regions of Georgia. They are the Appalachian Plateau region, the Ridge and Valley region, the Blue Ridge region, the Piedmont region, and the Atlantic Plain region.

The Appalachian Plateau region is the southern portion of the Appalachian Plateau that stretches from New York through Georgia and west into Alabama.

The Ridge and Valley region lies in the northwestern portion of the state. The area was formed due to extreme folding and faulting events. This folding and faulting created a series of ridges and valleys that vary in "height, width and geological materials". It consists of limestone, sandstone, chert, mudstone and shale as well as many other types of rocks. Much of the land in the area is heavily forested as forests cover almost half of the region.

The Blue Ridge region of Georgia is situated in the northeast of the state just north of the Piedmont. The mountain peaks in the Blue Ridge, which are among the highest in the state, average between two thousand and five thousand feet. It includes igneous, metamorphic, and sedimentary geology; the main types of rocks in the area are gneiss, slate and saprolite. The soils of the Broad Basin are mostly loamy or clayey Ultiso. The Blue Ridge consists primarily of Precambrian metamorphic rocks, and the landscape has relatively high relief.

The Piedmont region consists of Paleozoic metamorphic and igneous rocks, and the landscape has relatively low relief. The Piedmont is the second largest region of Georgia, and it has 3 water systems: the Chattahoochee River, West Point Lake, and Lake Sidney Lanier. The rocks of the Piedmont are made up of Precambrian and Paleozoic metamorphic and igneous rocks and the soils are of a finer texture than those found on the coastal plain. Some specific types of rock in the Piedmont are schist, gneiss, and phyllite among others. Georgia's coastal plain is made up of sedimentary rock dating from the Late Cretaceous to Holocene periods. The primary natural mineral resource in the area is kaolin.

The Coastal Plain region is the largest and includes portions of the Atlantic coastal plain and the Gulf of Mexico Coastal Plain. The Atlantic Coastal Plain and Gulf of Mexico Coastal Plain consist of sediments and sedimentary rocks that range in age from Cretaceous to Present. The boundary between the Piedmont Region and the Coastal Plain Region is the Fall Line. The Sandhills or Carolina Sandhills is a 10–35 mi (16–56 km) wide region within the Atlantic Coastal Plain province, along the inland margin of this province. The Satilla River is in the Atlantic Coastal Plain. Alapaha River, Suwanee River, and the Flint and Chattahoochee rivers flow through the Gulf Coastal Plain and the Florida Panhandle into the Gulf of Mexico. Lake Seminole is a reservoir at the confluence of the Chattahoochee and Flint rivers on the Georgia–Florida border.

=== Geologic history ===
The oldest known rocks found in Georgia are from the Precambrian Proterozoic Era and are about 1 to 1.34 billion years old. They are found in the Piedmont Plateau and Blue Ridge mountain regions. Approximately 1 billion years ago a metamorphic change occurred during an event called the Grenville Orogeny and caused the rocks, which were originally sediment, to compress into a form of rock called gneiss due to heat and pressure. Around 630 million years ago the Grenville mountains began to erode carrying sediments from streams to the sea. The gneiss formed from these sediments created the marble, metaconglomerate, phyllite, quartzite, schist, and slate found in the Blue Ridge and Piedmont areas.

Three separate orogeny events impacted the eastern portion of North America during the Paleozoic. From these orogeny came folding, faulting, and igneous intrusions in the Piedmont, the Blue Ridge, the Valley and Ridge and the Appalachian Plateau.

=== Georgia mountains ===
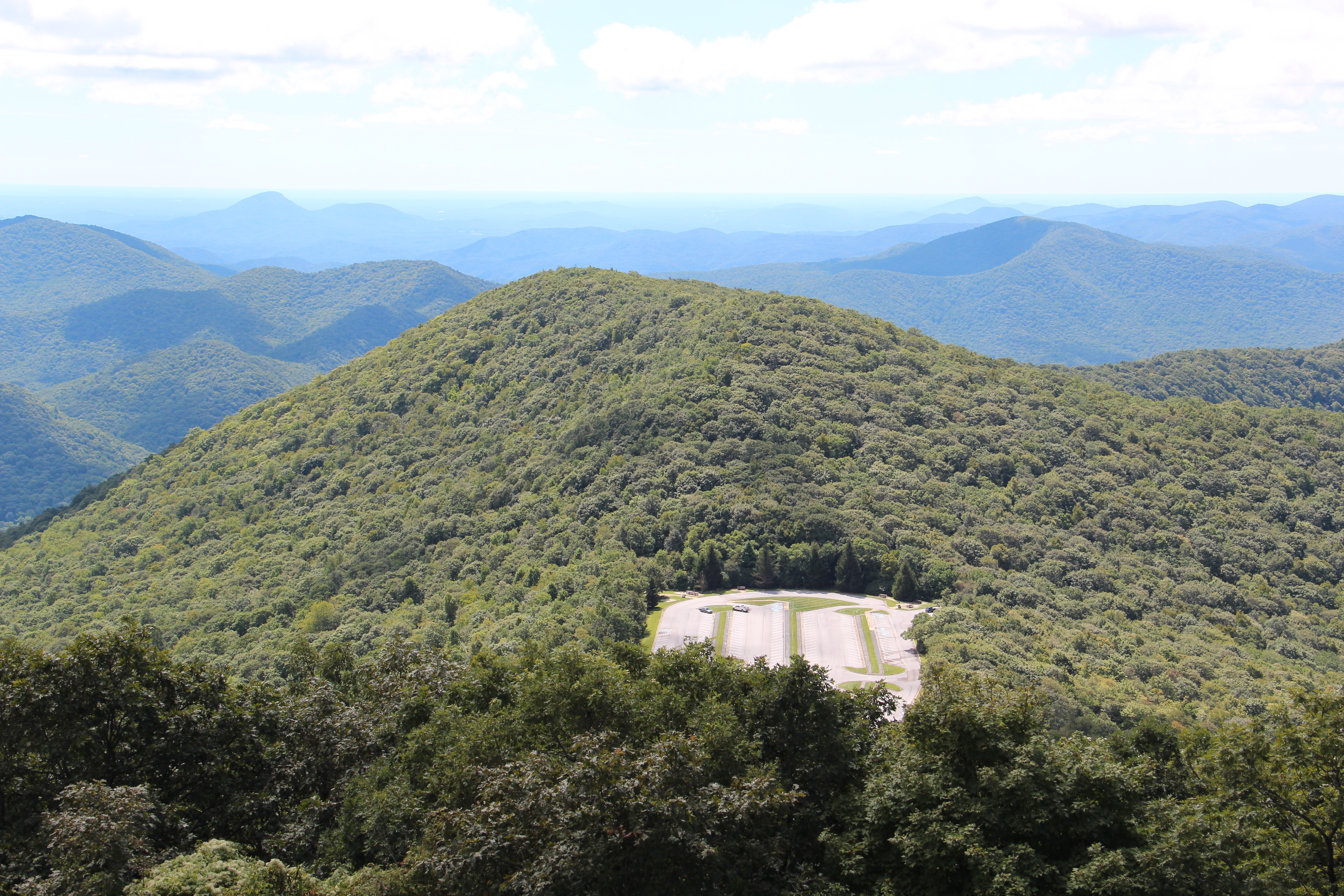
View from Brasstown Bald

The Georgia mountains region are part of the Blue Ridge Mountains and begin in the northeast corner of Georgia. Brasstown Bald, the highest mountain in Georgia at 4,784 feet (1,458 m) above mean sea level, is part of the chain and sits in an area known as Wolfpen Ridge. Other mountains in Georgia include Rabun Bald, Arabia Mountain, Big Bald Mountain, Black Mountain, and Blood Mountain.

Stone Mountain, located in Stone Mountain, Georgia is a well-known mountain that has an elevation of 1,683 feet (513 m) amsl from its summit and 825 feet (251 m) above the surrounding plateau. The mountain is known for its geology and also for its enormous bas-relief depicting three Confederate leaders: Jefferson Davis, Robert E. Lee and Thomas J. "Stonewall" Jackson. The bas-relief is the largest in the world.

=== Rivers and lakes ===
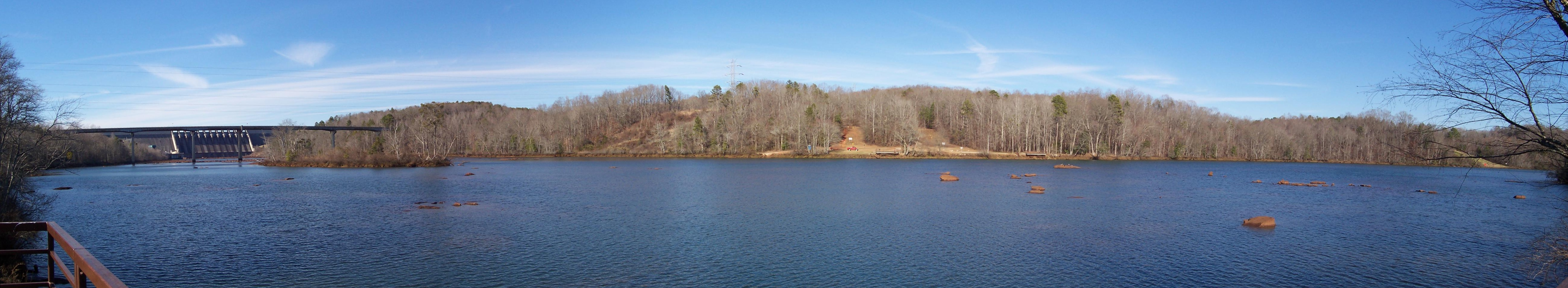
The Savannah River begins at Hartwell Dam

Several major rivers run through the state of Georgia. Some of them are the Flint River, Towaliga River, Ocmulgee River, Etowah River, Altamaha River, Savannah River, and the Suwannee River. The Chattahoochee River is Georgia's longest, at 436 miles (702 km). The river begins in the Blue Ridge Mountains just below Brasstown Bald and ends at Lake Seminole in the southwesternmost corner of Georgia where it creates a boundary between Alabama and Florida.

Lake Lanier is the largest lake in Georgia followed by Lake Oconee as the second largest. Lake Lanier is 26 miles (42 km) long and covers approximately 47 miles (76 km) of riverbed Lake Oconee is 20 miles (32 km) long and about a mile wide. Other lakes in the state include Lake Acworth, Lake Allatoona, Lake Blackshear, Jackson Lake (Georgia), West Point Lake, High Falls, Lake Seminole, Lake Chatuge and Walter F. George Lake.

=== Islands ===
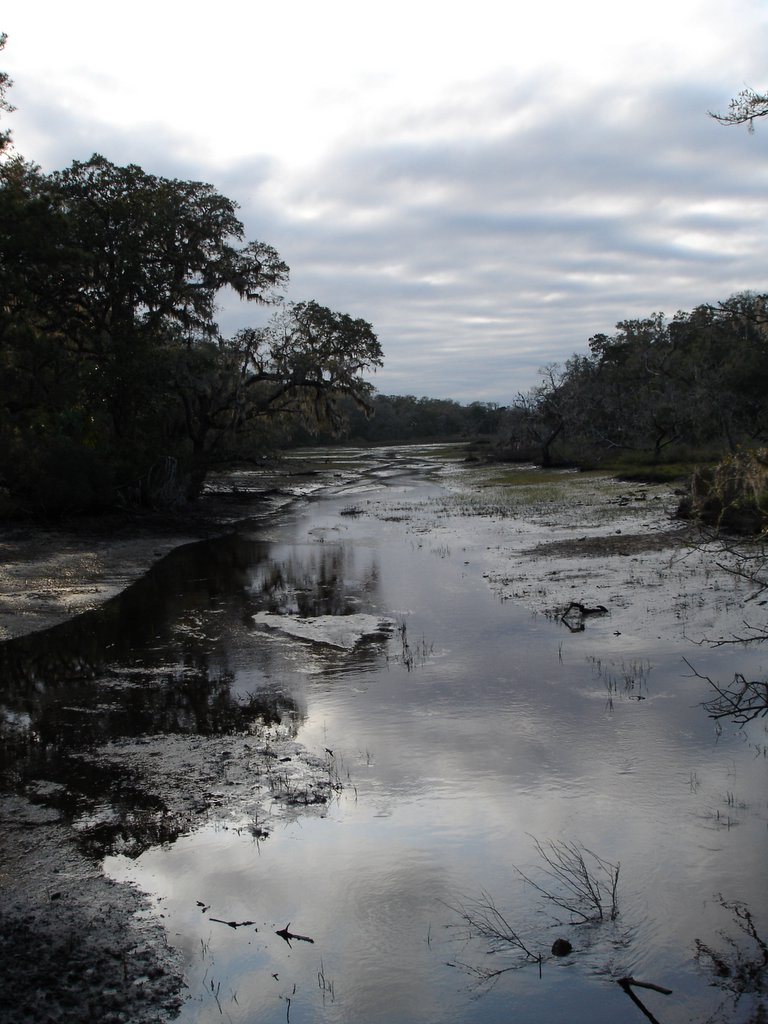
Marsh on Cumberland Island

Georgia has fourteen barrier islands off of its coast. Four of these islands are known as the Golden Isles. The largest of these islands is Cumberland Island in Camden County. The island is uninhabited and is only accessible by boat. Some of the next largest islands are St. Simon's Island in Glynn County as the second largest; Ossabaw Island, twenty miles (32 km) south of Savannah, is the third largest of the islands and Sapelo Island, sixty miles south of Savannah, is the fourth. The smallest of the islands is Jekyll Island in Glynn County.

== Climate ==
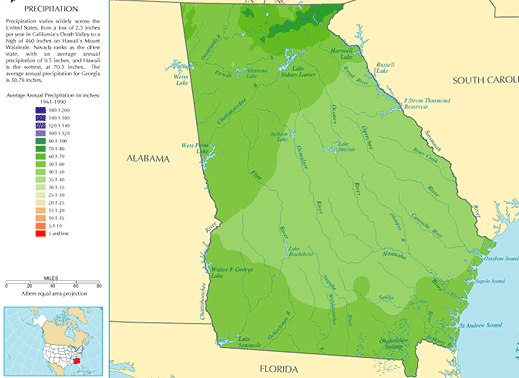
Average annual precipitation for Georgia

The majority of Georgia has primarily a humid subtropical climate tempered somewhat by occasional polar air masses in the winter. Hot and humid summers are typical, except at the highest elevations. The entire state, including the north Georgia mountains, receives moderate to heavy precipitation, which varies from 45 inches (1,100 mm) in central Georgia to approximately 75 inches (1,900 mm) around the Northeast part of the state. The degree to which the weather of a certain area of Georgia is subtropical depends not just on the latitude, but also on how close it is to the Atlantic Ocean or Gulf of Mexico and the altitude. This is especially true in the mountainous areas in the northern part of the state, which are further away from ocean waters and can be up to 4,500 feet (1,400 m) or higher above sea level.

In spite of having moderate weather compared to many other states, Georgia has occasional extreme weather. The highest temperature ever recorded is 112 °F (44 °C), while the lowest ever recorded is −17 °F (−27 °C). Georgia is one of the leading states in incidents of tornadoes. The areas closest to the Florida border get the same small F0 and F1 tornadoes associated with summer afternoon thunderstorms. However, it is very uncommon for tornadoes to become severe (over F3). As it is on the Atlantic coast, Georgia is also vulnerable to hurricanes, although the Georgia coastline only rarely experiences a direct hurricane strike. More common are hurricanes which strike the Florida panhandle, weaken over land, and bring strong tropical storm winds and heavy rain to the Georgia interior, as well as hurricanes that come close to the Georgia coastline, brushing the coast on their recurvature on the way up to hit the Carolinas.

However, Georgia has had severe droughts, especially in 2007. Temperatures over 100 degrees have been recorded.

=== Climate data ===
Climate data for Atlanta (Hartsfield–Jackson Int'l), 1991–2020 normals (Note: Mean monthly maxima and minima (i.e. the highest and lowest temperature readings during an entire month or year) calculated based on data at said location from 1991 to 2020.), extremes 1878–present (Note: Official records for Atlanta were kept at the Weather Bureau in downtown from October 1878 to August 1928, and at Hartsfield–Jackson Int'l since September 1928.)
Month	Jan	Feb	Mar	Apr	May	Jun	Jul	Aug	Sep	Oct	Nov	Dec	Year
Record high °F (°C)	79 (26)	81 (27)	89 (32)	93 (34)	97 (36)	106 (41)	105 (41)	104 (40)	102 (39)	98 (37)	84 (29)	79 (26)	106 (41)
Mean maximum °F (°C)	70.3 (21.3)	73.5 (23.1)	80.8 (27.1)	84.7 (29.3)	89.6 (32.0)	94.3 (34.6)	95.8 (35.4)	95.9 (35.5)	91.9 (33.3)	85.0 (29.4)	77.5 (25.3)	71.5 (21.9)	97.3 (36.3)
Mean daily maximum °F (°C)	54.0 (12.2)	58.2 (14.6)	65.9 (18.8)	73.8 (23.2)	81.1 (27.3)	87.1 (30.6)	90.1 (32.3)	89.0 (31.7)	83.9 (28.8)	74.4 (23.6)	64.1 (17.8)	56.2 (13.4)	73.2 (22.9)
Daily mean °F (°C)	44.8 (7.1)	48.5 (9.2)	55.6 (13.1)	63.2 (17.3)	71.2 (21.8)	77.9 (25.5)	80.9 (27.2)	80.2 (26.8)	74.9 (23.8)	64.7 (18.2)	54.2 (12.3)	47.3 (8.5)	63.6 (17.6)
Mean daily minimum °F (°C)	35.6 (2.0)	38.9 (3.8)	45.3 (7.4)	52.5 (11.4)	61.3 (16.3)	68.6 (20.3)	71.8 (22.1)	71.3 (21.8)	65.9 (18.8)	54.9 (12.7)	44.2 (6.8)	38.4 (3.6)	54.1 (12.3)
Mean minimum °F (°C)	17.3 (−8.2)	23.2 (−4.9)	28.1 (−2.2)	36.9 (2.7)	47.6 (8.7)	59.9 (15.5)	65.6 (18.7)	64.5 (18.1)	53.4 (11.9)	38.7 (3.7)	29.2 (−1.6)	23.8 (−4.6)	15.2 (−9.3)
Record low °F (°C)	−8 (−22)	−9 (−23)	10 (−12)	25 (−4)	37 (3)	39 (4)	53 (12)	55 (13)	36 (2)	28 (−2)	3 (−16)	0 (−18)	−9 (−23)
Average precipitation inches (mm)	4.59 (117)	4.55 (116)	4.68 (119)	3.81 (97)	3.56 (90)	4.54 (115)	4.75 (121)	4.30 (109)	3.82 (97)	3.28 (83)	3.98 (101)	4.57 (116)	50.43 (1,281)
Average snowfall inches (cm)	1.0 (2.5)	0.4 (1.0)	0.4 (1.0)	0.0 (0.0)	0.0 (0.0)	0.0 (0.0)	0.0 (0.0)	0.0 (0.0)	0.0 (0.0)	0.0 (0.0)	0.0 (0.0)	0.4 (1.0)	2.2 (5.6)
Average precipitation days (≥ 0.01 in)	11.1	10.4	10.5	8.9	9.4	11.1	12.0	10.2	7.3	6.8	7.9	10.7	116.3
Average snowy days (≥ 0.01 in)	0.7	0.3	0.1	0.0	0.0	0.0	0.0	0.0	0.0	0.0	0.0	0.4	1.5
Average relative humidity (%)	67.6	63.4	62.4	61.0	67.2	69.8	74.4	74.8	73.9	68.5	68.1	68.4	68.3
Average dew point °F (°C)	29.3 (−1.5)	30.9 (−0.6)	38.5 (3.6)	45.7 (7.6)	56.1 (13.4)	63.7 (17.6)	67.8 (19.9)	67.5 (19.7)	62.1 (16.7)	49.6 (9.8)	41.0 (5.0)	33.1 (0.6)	48.8 (9.3)
Mean monthly sunshine hours	164.0	171.7	220.5	261.2	288.6	284.8	273.8	258.6	227.5	238.5	185.1	164.0	2,738.3
Percentage possible sunshine	52	56	59	67	67	66	63	62	61	68	59	53	62
Average ultraviolet index	2.8	4.1	6.1	7.9	9.1	9.7	9.9	9.2	7.4	5.2	3.3	2.5	6.4
Source 1: NOAA (relative humidity, dew point and sun 1961–1990)
Source 2: Extremes UV Index Today (1995 to 2022)

Climate data for Savannah, Georgia (Köppen Cfa), 1991–2020 normals
Month	Jan	Feb	Mar	Apr	May	Jun	Jul	Aug	Sep	Oct	Nov	Dec	Year
Record high °F (°C)	84 (29)	87 (31)	94 (34)	95 (35)	102 (39)	104 (40)	105 (41)	104 (40)	102 (39)	97 (36)	89 (32)	83 (28)	105 (41)
Mean maximum °F (°C)	77.5 (25.3)	80.9 (27.2)	84.9 (29.4)	89.1 (31.7)	94.0 (34.4)	97.5 (36.4)	98.8 (37.1)	97.6 (36.4)	94.0 (34.4)	88.6 (31.4)	83.3 (28.5)	78.2 (25.7)	99.7 (37.6)
Mean daily maximum °F (°C)	61.4 (16.3)	65.1 (18.4)	71.4 (21.9)	78.2 (25.7)	84.7 (29.3)	89.6 (32.0)	92.3 (33.5)	90.8 (32.7)	86.4 (30.2)	79.0 (26.1)	70.2 (21.2)	63.7 (17.6)	77.7 (25.4)
Daily mean °F (°C)	50.7 (10.4)	54.0 (12.2)	60.0 (15.6)	66.7 (19.3)	74.1 (23.4)	80.1 (26.7)	83.0 (28.3)	82.1 (27.8)	77.7 (25.4)	68.8 (20.4)	59.1 (15.1)	53.2 (11.8)	67.5 (19.7)
Mean daily minimum °F (°C)	40.0 (4.4)	42.9 (6.1)	48.6 (9.2)	55.2 (12.9)	63.4 (17.4)	70.7 (21.5)	73.7 (23.2)	73.3 (22.9)	69.0 (20.6)	58.6 (14.8)	48.0 (8.9)	42.6 (5.9)	57.2 (14.0)
Mean minimum °F (°C)	23.3 (−4.8)	26.5 (−3.1)	31.2 (−0.4)	39.4 (4.1)	49.8 (9.9)	62.7 (17.1)	68.6 (20.3)	67.2 (19.6)	57.1 (13.9)	42.1 (5.6)	31.4 (−0.3)	26.9 (−2.8)	21.6 (−5.8)
Record low °F (°C)	3 (−16)	8 (−13)	20 (−7)	28 (−2)	39 (4)	49 (9)	61 (16)	57 (14)	43 (6)	28 (−2)	15 (−9)	9 (−13)	3 (−16)
Average precipitation inches (mm)	3.28 (83)	2.80 (71)	3.50 (89)	3.39 (86)	3.62 (92)	6.65 (169)	5.75 (146)	5.46 (139)	4.35 (110)	3.72 (94)	2.39 (61)	3.21 (82)	48.12 (1,222)
Average precipitation days (≥ 0.01 in)	8.5	7.8	7.9	6.7	7.3	12.3	12.4	12.8	9.9	6.8	6.8	8.4	107.6
Average relative humidity (%)	69.6	67.0	66.8	65.4	70.1	73.6	76.0	78.6	77.7	72.9	72.3	70.8	71.7
Average dew point °F (°C)	37.0 (2.8)	38.8 (3.8)	45.7 (7.6)	51.6 (10.9)	60.8 (16.0)	67.8 (19.9)	71.2 (21.8)	71.6 (22.0)	67.5 (19.7)	56.5 (13.6)	48.0 (8.9)	40.5 (4.7)	54.8 (12.6)
Mean monthly sunshine hours	175.5	181.0	232.0	275.6	288.9	276.0	271.3	245.8	214.3	228.6	193.5	174.2	2,756.7
Percentage possible sunshine	55	59	62	71	67	65	62	60	58	65	61	56	62
Source: NOAA (relative humidity, dew point and sun 1961–1990)

=== Climate change ===
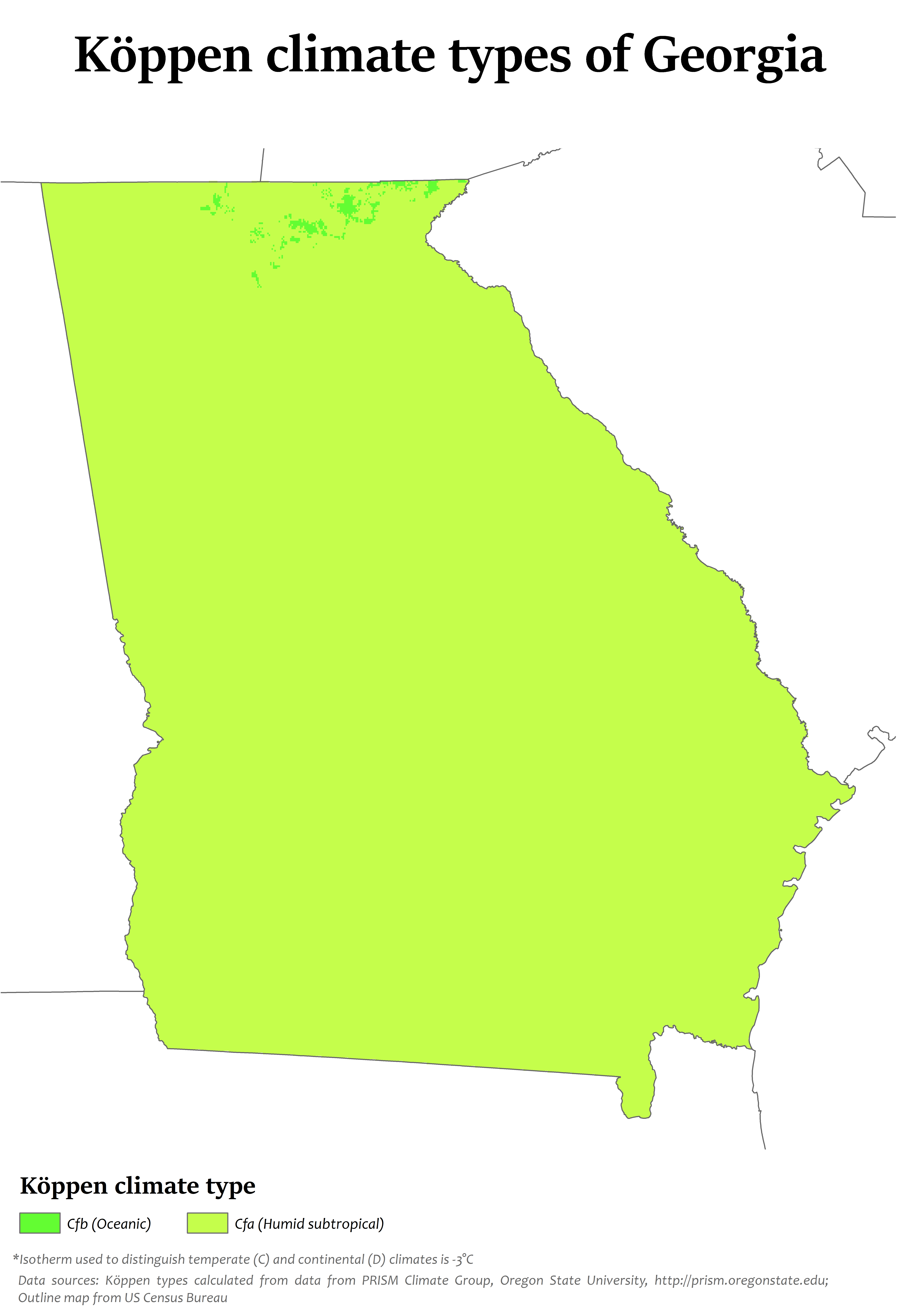
Köppen climate classification types of Georgia show almost the entire state to be humid subtropical.

Climate change in Georgia encompasses the effects of climate change, attributed to man-made increases in atmospheric carbon dioxide, in the U.S. state of Georgia.

Studies show that Georgia is among a string of "Deep South" states that will experience the worst effects of climate change, with effects including "more severe floods and drought", and higher water levels "eroding beaches, submerging low lands, and exacerbating coastal flooding."

In coming decades, climate change will cause higher temperatures, and more severe flooding and droughts in the state, according to a 2016 pamphlet published by the United States Environmental Protection Agency (EPA). The temperature changes will increase the risk of heat stroke and other heat-related illnesses.

== Political and human geography ==
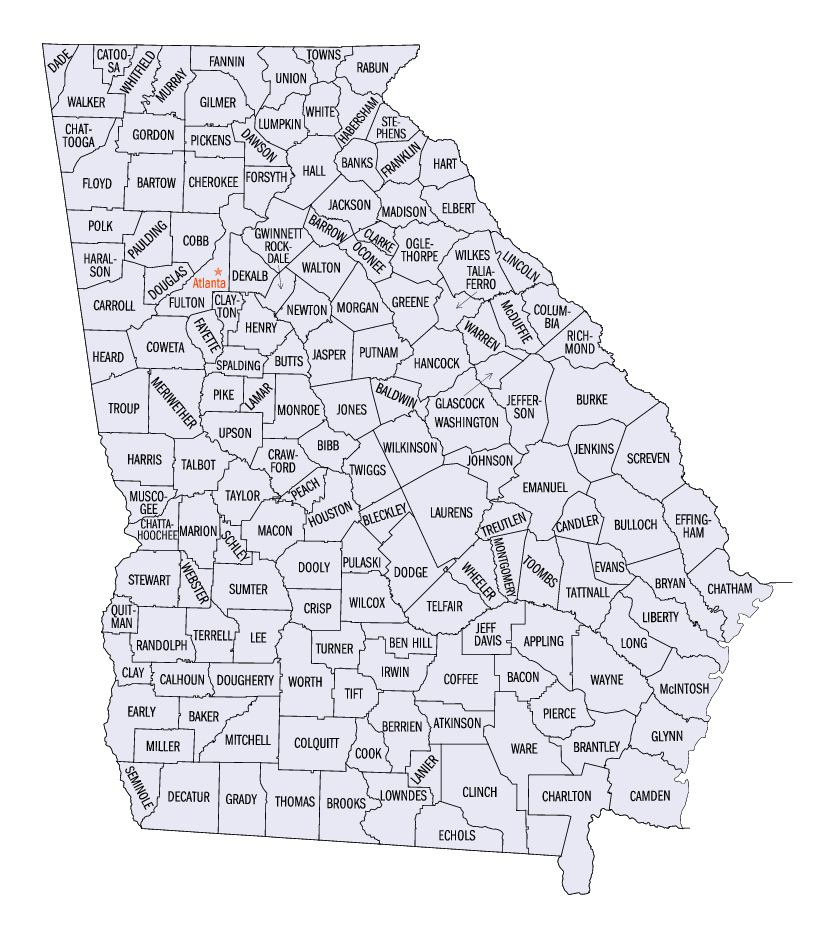
Map of Georgia with named counties

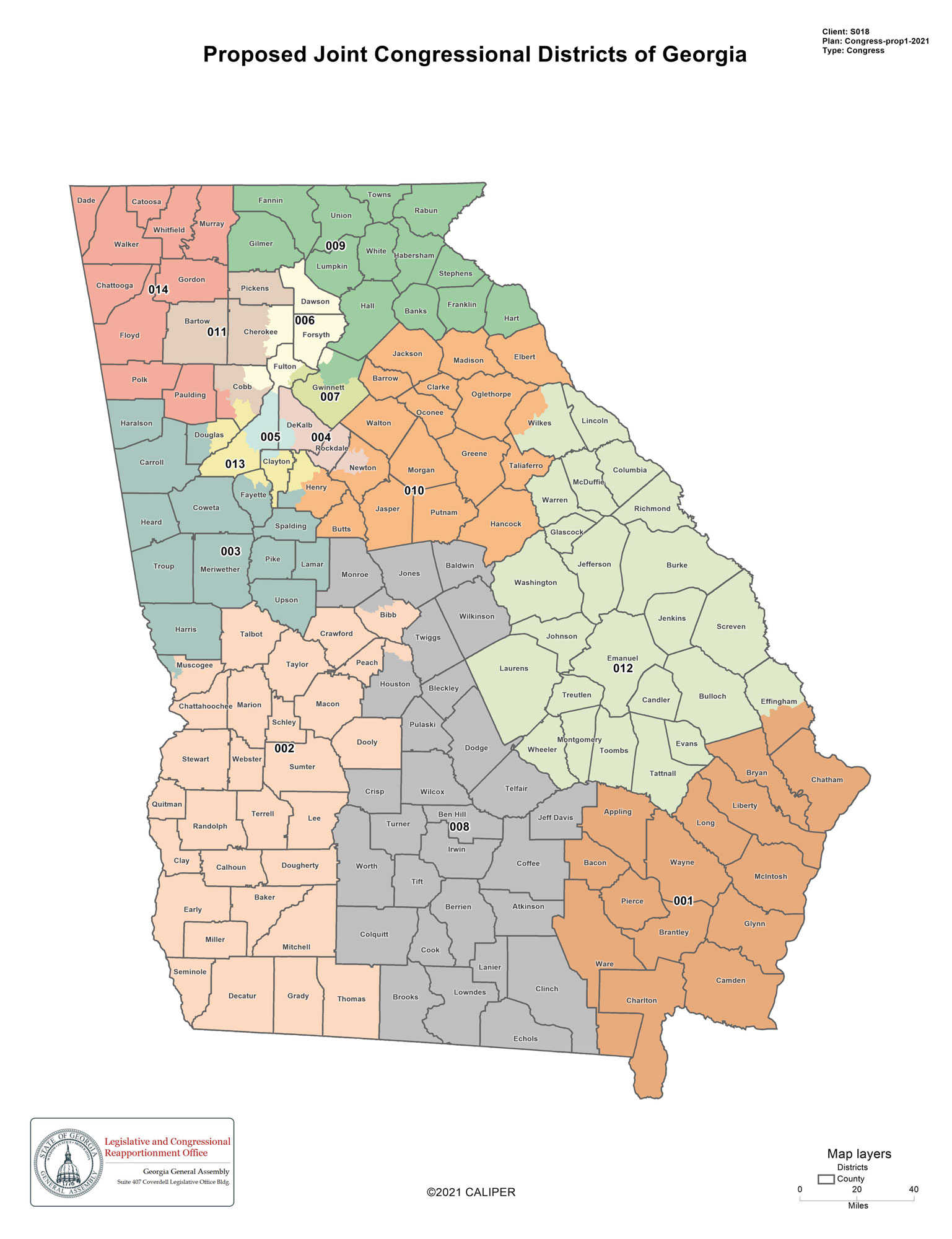
Map of Georgia congressional districts since 2022

Georgia is made up of more than 500 cities in 159 counties within 14 congressional districts. The map to the right shows the county boundaries for all 159 counties in Georgia.

149 of the 159 counties in the state are governed by a committee made of between three and eleven commissioners while the other 10 counties are overseen by a single commissioner. All commissioners are elected by the voters of their county for terms that range between two and six years with most counties having terms lasting four years. Serving members wield both executive and legislative power in their county.

Most of the 536 cities in Georgia are governed by a mayor-council system. All municipalities in the state are considered cities. There are no lesser incorporations such as towns, villages, or boroughs. Most basic public services rendered outside of the cities are provided by the counties.

== Natural resources ==
=== Agriculture and water ===
Georgia has almost eight million acres (32,000 km^{2}) of prime farmland while over 60% of the land is made up of pine forests. Due to the great number of forested areas in the state Georgia produces more lumber and pulpwood than any other state east of the Mississippi river; from these forests come 74.4 percent of the rosins and turpentines (naval stores) produced in the United States, and over half of the world's supply. Both the agricultural areas and the waters of Georgia have created a thriving environment for hunting, fishing and game. The state of Georgia has much in the way of agricultural resources. Georgia has 70,150 miles (112,900 km) of streams and rivers, 425,000 acres (1,720 km^{2}) of lakes, and approximately 4,500,000 acres (18,000 km^{2}) of freshwater wetlands.

=== Geological resources ===
The geological resources of Georgia include many types of minerals, manganese, iron ore, copper, coal, oil, clays, stone, kaolin, sand and gravel.

== See also ==
- Geologic map of Georgia
