= 2025 Georgia state elections =

2025 Georgia elections
- November 4, 2025

Several elections took place in the U.S. state of Georgia in 2025.

== Public Service Commission special elections ==
Special elections for Public Service Commission (PSC) districts 2 and 3 were held on November 4, 2025. Both seats were previously scheduled for election in 2022, but were delayed by federal court order during litigation in the case Rose v. Raffensperger. The primary was held on June 17, 2025. It was the first statewide special election in Georgia for a non-federal office since the 1998 special election for an at-large seat on the PSC, as well as the first odd-year special election for a statewide non-federal seat since the 1883 Georgia gubernatorial special election. Democrats flipped both seats, with Alicia Johnson defeating Republican incumbent Tim Echols for district 2 and Peter Hubbard defeating Republican incumbent Fitz Johnson for district 3. Johnson and Hubbard became the first Democrats elected to statewide non-federal office since 2006, with Johnson becoming the first African American woman elected to statewide office.

== State legislative special elections ==
=== Senate district 21 ===
A special election was held on August 30 to succeed State Senator Brandon Beach, who was appointed by President Donald Trump as U.S. Treasurer. Out of seven candidates, Democrat Debra Shigley and Republican Jason Dickerson advanced to the September 23 runoff, where Dickerson defeated Shigley.

Senate district 21 special election
Party	Candidate	Votes	%
Democratic	Debra Shigley	8,444	39.52
Republican	Jason Dickerson	3,709	17.36
Republican	Steve West	3,642	17.04
Republican	Brian Will	2,192	10.26
Republican	Brice Futch	1,749	8.19
Republican	Lance Calvert	1,424	6.66
Republican	Stephanie Donegan	207	0.97
Total votes		21,367	100

Senate district 21 special election runoff
Party	Candidate	Votes	%
Republican	Jason Dickerson	19,065	61.46
Democratic	Debra Shigley	11,955	38.54
Total votes		31,020	100
Republican hold			

=== House district 106 ===
A special election was called for House district 106 on November 4 to succeed Shelly Hutchinson. Democratic candidates Marqus Cole and Muhammad Akbar Ali advanced to the December 2 runoff. Ali defeated Cole in a low-turnout contest, becoming the youngest state lawmaker in Georgia's history at 21 years of age.

House district 106 special election
Party	Candidate	Votes	%
Democratic	Marqus Cole	3,171	38.96
Democratic	Muhammad Akbar Ali	2,613	32.10
Republican	Jamie Parker	2,355	28.94
Total votes		8,139	100

House district 106 special election runoff
Party	Candidate	Votes	%
Democratic	Muhammad Akbar Ali	947	54.39
Democratic	Marqus Cole	794	45.61
Total votes		1,741	100
Democratic hold			

=== Senate district 35 ===
A special election was called for Senate district 35 on November 18 to succeed Jason Esteves. Democratic candidates Jaha Howard and Roger Bruce advanced to the December 16 runoff. Howard won the runoff election by narrowly defeating Bruce.

Senate district 35 special election
Party	Candidate	Votes	%
Democratic	Jaha Howard	5,134	32.63
Democratic	Roger Bruce	3,992	25.37
Republican	Josh Tolbert	2,765	17.58
Democratic	Erica-Denise Solomon	2,720	17.29
Democratic	John D. Williams	832	5.29
Independent	Corenza Morris	290	1.84
Total votes		15,733	100

Senate district 35 special election runoff
Party	Candidate	Votes	%
Democratic	Jaha Howard	3,229	51.90
Democratic	Roger Bruce	2,993	48.10
Total votes		6,222	100
Democratic hold			

=== House district 121 ===
In the 2024 election, State Rep. Marcus Wiedower, a Republican, defeated Eric Gisler with 61.1% of the vote in the election for Georgia's 121st House district. On October 28, 2025, Wiedower resigned. He explained that he was no longer able to fully allocate his attention and time on political responsibilities because of his private-sector professional obligations.

On November 3, 2025, Georgia Secretary of State Brad Raffensperger issued a call for the special election, scheduling it for December 9. If a runoff election had been needed, it would have been held on January 6, 2026. Democratic candidate Eric Gisler and Republican candidate Mack "Dutch" Guest IV filed for the election. Gisler won the special election for the Democrats, flipping a seat which had previously voted for Donald Trump in 2024 by 12 percentage points.

Eric Gisler was already running for the seat in the 2026 election.

Georgia House of Representatives 121st district special election
Party	Candidate	Votes	%
Democratic	Eric Gisler	5,874	50.86
Republican	Mack "Dutch" Guest IV	5,676	49.14
Total votes		11,550	100
Democratic gain from Republican			

=== House district 23 ===
A special election was called for Georgia's 23rd House district on December 9 to succeed Mandi Ballinger. Five Republicans and one Democrat filed for the special election. Republican Bill Fincher and Democrat Scott Sanders advanced to the January 6, 2026 runoff where Fincher comfortably defeated Sanders.

House district 23 special election
Party	Candidate	Votes	%
Republican	Bill Fincher	1,373	27.40
Democratic	Scott Sanders	1,340	26.74
Republican	Brice Futch	1,115	22.25
Republican	Ann Gazell	608	12.13
Republican	Rajpal "Raj" Sagoo	559	11.16
Republican	William Ware	16	0.32
Total votes		5,011	100

House district 23 special election runoff
Party	Candidate	Votes	%
Republican	Bill Fincher	4,345	71.38
Democratic	Scott Sanders	1,742	28.62
Total votes		6,087	100
Republican hold			

== District attorneys ==
A special election for Tifton District Attorney to fill the remaining term of Republican incumbent Bryce A. Johnson was cancelled when Republican acting district attorney Patrick Warren filed as the only candidate for the role.

== Local elections ==
Municipal elections were held on November 4 in most Georgia cities for city council seats and several mayoralties, including Atlanta, Marietta, Sandy Springs, and South Fulton. In addition, special elections were held for Columbia County Commission District 2 and Augusta-Richmond County Commission District 4.

- Atlanta:
  - Incumbent mayor Andre Dickens was re-elected
- South Fulton: Incumbent mayor Khalid Kamau lost re-election in the general election, with Carmalitha Gumbs being elected in the runoff
- Stockbridge: Incumbent mayor Anthony Ford lost re-election to Jayden Williams
- Stone Mountain: Incumbent mayor Beverly Jones lost re-election to Jelani Lender
- Marietta: Incumbent mayor Steve "Thunder" Tumlin was re-elected against Sam Foster
- Newnan: Incumbent mayor Keith Brady lost re-election to James Shepherd
- Sandy Springs: Incumbent mayor Rusty Paul was re-elected against Dontaye Carter after being forced to a runoff
- Roswell: Incumbent mayor Kurt Wilson lost re-election to Mary Robichaux after being forced to a runoff
- Chattahoochee Hills: Camille Lowe defeated Richard Schmidt to succeed Tom Reed, who did not seek re-election.
- Warner Robins: Incumbent mayor LaRhonda Patrick won re-election
- Cairo: Incumbent mayor Ed Robinson lost re-election to Arlisha Williams
