= 2025 in Georgia (U.S. state) =

- Decades: 2000s; 2010s; 2020s
- See also: History of Georgia (U.S. state); Historical outline of Georgia (U.S. state); List of years in Georgia (U.S. state); 2025 in the United States

The following is a list of events of the year 2025 in Georgia.

== Incumbents ==
=== State government ===
- Governor: Brian Kemp (R)

== Events ==
- January 9 – The state funeral for Jimmy Carter, who died in December, is held.
- January 16 – State Representative Colton Moore is arrested after attempting to enter the House chambers during Governor Brian Kemp's State of the State speech. Moore had been banned from entering the chambers by Speaker Jon G. Burns after Moore denounced late Speaker David Ralston during a ceremony honoring him.
- January 28 – 2025 Southwest United States measles outbreak: The Georgia Department of Public Health confirms the state's first case of measles in 2025.
- April 10 – 2025 Masters Tournament
- May 30 – Camilla Mayor Kelvin Owens and two local elections officials are charged with election interference in relation to an election the previous November. Owens cited emergency powers to halt the city's elections after the two officials resigned their posts, citing a court's removal of a city council member who did not live in Camilla. The elections were held later after a judge appointed new supervisors.
- July 28 – One person is killed and ten others are injured in a shooting in a nightlife district of Sweet Auburn in Atlanta.
- August 6 – Five soldiers are shot in a mass shooting at Fort Stewart. A soldier is arrested for the shooting.
- August 8 – A gunman kills a DeKalb County Police officer and fires multiple shots into a Centers for Disease Control building on the Emory University campus before killing himself.
- September 4 – 475 people, mostly South Korean nationals, are detained during an ICE raid at a Hyundai plant in Ellabell. According to HSI, it is the largest single-site enforcement operation in HSI history.
- October 8 – Derrick Groves, the last of ten inmates who escaped from the Orleans Justice Center in New Orleans, Louisiana in May, is apprehended in Atlanta.
- October 13 – Eight people are killed in a crash involving a semitruck and van in Jackson County, including five children.
- November 4
  - 2025 Atlanta mayoral election: Mayor Andre Dickens wins reelection.
  - 2025 Georgia Public Service Commission special election: Democrats Alicia Johnson and Peter Hubbard win two of the five seats on the Georgia Public Service Commission, defeating Republican incumbents Tim Echols and Fitz Johnson, respectively. The election is the first time Democrats have won a non-federal statewide office in Georgia since 2006.
- November 14 – Pete Skandalakis, head of the Prosecuting Attorneys' Council of Georgia, announces he will take over prosecutions in the State of Georgia v. Donald J. Trump, et al. criminal case. Previous prosecutor Fani Willis was disqualified due to having a romantic relationship with a special prosecutor she had chosen to lead the case.
- November 21 – Representative Marjorie Taylor Greene (R) announces she will resign from office on January 5, 2026.
- December 9 − Democrat Eric Gisler wins the Georgia State House District 121 special election.

== See also ==
- 2025 in the United States
