= Mack Guest IV =

American politician

Member of the Georgia House of Representatives from the 121st district
- Member-elect
- Assumed office January 11, 2027
- Preceded by: Eric Gisler

Personal details
- Born: February 1984 (age 42)
- Party: Republican
- Spouse: Mary Beth Lee Guest
- Children: 2
- Education: North Hall High School; Valdosta State University; University of North Georgia
- Website: Official website

Mack "Dutch" Guest IV (born February 1984) is an American politician and a trucking and logistics business owner who is a member-elect of the Georgia House of Representatives, representing the 121st district. He was elected to the Georgia House of Representatives, in the general election on November 3, 2026. He was a candidate in the 2025 special election.

== Early life, education, and career ==
Guest was born in February 1984 (Note: On November 18, 2025, Guest was quoted as saying, "Lot of people my age. I'm 41.") to Mack Guest III and Camilla Morris Guest and has two sisters. His father was a former Georgia Bulldogs football offensive line varsity captain (1976–78). He grew up in Clermont, Georgia in the Gainesville metropolitan area and graduated from North Hall High School before attending Valdosta State University and graduating from University of North Georgia.

His father Mack III and uncle Judson co-founded LAD Logistics in 1997 and LAD Truck Lines in 1999, both of which are based in Watkinsville, Georgia and named after the initials of Guest and his two sisters: Laura, Amanda, and Dutch. Mack IV has served as general manager and executive vice president of his family business, LAD Truck Lines.

Guest served as president of the Oconee County Rotary Club from 2021 to 2022 and as president of the Touchdown Club of Athens from 2022 to 2023. He also serves on the community advisory board for the Oconee State Bank and on the executive board of the Georgia Trucking Association.

Guest is also the co-founder of South Main Brewing, a brewery in Watkinsville.

== Political career ==
=== 2025 special election ===
On November 10, 2025, 3 days after qualifying for the ballot, Guest announced his bid for the 2025 Georgia special election to replace Marcus Wiedower, where he faced Democrat Eric Gisler. Guest described himself as a "lifelong Republican". He centered his campaign on tax cuts, education, community safety, and transportation. Guest said politics would be a "short stint" in his life, and signed the U.S. Term Limits pledge for an Article V convention to enact Congressional term limits. Gisler defeated Guest by a margin of 198 votes, 50.86% to 49.14%. The election was considered an upset, as the district had voted for Trump by 12 points in the 2024 election.

=== 2026 election ===
In the 2026 election, Guest faced Eric Gisler again, with the latter as an incumbent. Guest supported increasing the minimum wage, setting a cap on property taxes, lowering the state income tax, and reviewing the sales tax, alongside opposing state incentives for AI data centers and tax breaks for Hollywood film production. He opposed abortions without any exceptions and supported Flock cameras albeit with data access restrictions. He supported increasing mental health care funding and a bill to prohibit communities from dropping homeless individuals off to other places.

Guest defeated Gisler in the rematch, by a vote of 52.47% to 47.53%. During the 2026 midterm "blue wave", this state legislative race was the sole instance of a Republican gain in Georgia.

== Personal life ==
Guest is married to his wife, Mary Beth Lee Guest. They reside in Oconee County, Georgia, where they have lived for 20 years. They have two children: a daughter and a son.

== Electoral history ==
2025 Georgia House of Representatives 121st district special election
Party	Candidate	Votes	%
Democratic	Eric Gisler	5,874	50.86
Republican	Mack "Dutch" Guest IV	5,676	49.14
Total votes		11,550	100
Democratic gain from Republican			

2026 Georgia House of Representatives 121st district general election
Party	Candidate	Votes	%
Republican	Mack "Dutch" Guest IV	14,125	52.47
Democratic	Eric Gisler	12,793	47.53
Total votes		26,918	100
Republican gain from Democratic			
