= 1776 in Georgia (U.S. state) =

- Decades: 1760s; 1770s; 1780s; 1790s
- See also: History of Georgia (U.S. state); Historical outline of Georgia (U.S. state); List of years in Georgia (U.S. state); 1776 in the United States

This is a list of events in the year 1776 in the U.S. state of Georgia.

== Incumbents ==
- Governor: Archibald Bulloch (Starting April 15)

== Events ==
- March 2–3 – American Revolution: Battle of the Rice Boats: Following the British seizure of rice from merchant ships on the Savannah River, militia from Georgia and South Carolina attack the British squadron on the river using fire ships.
- April 15 – Archibald Bulloch is sworn in as the first governor.
- July 4 – American Revolution: The United States Declaration of Independence, in which the United States officially declares independence from the British Empire, is approved by the Continental Congress and signed by its president, John Hancock, together with representatives from Connecticut, Delaware, Georgia, Maryland, Massachusetts Bay, New Hampshire, New Jersey, New York, North Carolina, Pennsylvania, Rhode Island, South Carolina and Virginia.
- August 2 – American Revolution: A parchment copy of the Declaration of Independence is signed by 56 members of Congress (not all of whom had been present on July 4).

== Births ==
- January 20 – Charles Pinckney Sumner, attorney, abolitionist, and politician (d. 1839)
- February 16 – Nicholas Ware, lawyer, slave owner and politician (d. 1824)
- February 18 – William Scarbrough, sea merchant (d. 1838)
- March 17 – Joel Abbot, physician and politician (d. 1826)
- May 13 – Jett Thomas, military officer, politician, and builder (d. 1817)
- September 17 – Langdon Cheves, politician, lawyer and businessman (d. 1857)
- October 10 – Henry Shultz, entrepreneur (d. 1851)
- October 18 – Cowles Mead, politician (d. 1844)

== See also ==
- 1776 in the United States
- List of years in Georgia
