= 2026 in Georgia (U.S. state) =

- Decades: 2000s; 2010s; 2020s
- See also: History of Georgia (U.S. state); Historical outline of Georgia (U.S. state); List of years in Georgia (U.S. state); 2026 in the United States

The following is a list of events of the year 2026 in Georgia.

== Incumbents ==
=== State Government ===
- Governor: Brian Kemp (R)

== Events ==
=== January ===
- January 5 – Representative Marjorie Taylor Greene resigns from office.
- January 12 – A large fight at Washington State Prison kills three inmates and injures over a dozen, including a guard. The Georgia Department of Corrections reports the violence was gang-affiliated.
- January 13 – A fire at a poultry plant in Walton County kills 14,000 chickens.
- January 28 – The FBI executes a search warrant on a Fulton County elections office in Union City.

=== February ===
- February 16 – A man fleeing an ICE traffic stop crashes into another vehicle in Savannah, killing teacher Linda Davis.

=== March ===
- March 3 – Colin Gray, the father of Apalachee High School shooting suspect Colt Gray, is found guilty of second-degree murder and involuntary manslaughter. Colin Gray gave his son the rifle he later used to kill two students and two teachers at Apalachee High School in 2024.
- March 4 – A Kingsland woman is arrested and later charged with murder for allegedly taking pills to induce an abortion, and the fetus lived for an hour after delivery, in December 2025. This case may be one of the first prosecuted after Georgia's 2019 abortion ban.
- March 10 – 2026 Georgia's 14th congressional district special election: No candidate receives more than 50% of the vote, leading to a runoff election on April 7.
- March 17 – A man shoots a Veterans Affairs employee outside the VA office in Jasper. Responding police fatally shoot the suspect.
- March 18 – The Supreme Court of Georgia questions a prosecutor who prepared an order with AI-generated deficiencies to deny a convict a re-trial.
- March 23 –
  - Immigration and Customs Enforcement agents are deployed to 14 airports nationwide, including Hartsfield–Jackson Atlanta International Airport.
  - The Floyd County Courthouse in Rome is destroyed by a fire.

=== April ===
- April 7 – Republican Clay Fuller beats Democrat Shawn Harris to win a special election to replace former U.S. Representative Marjorie Taylor Greene, who resigned in January.
- April 9–12 – The 2026 Masters Tournament is held at Augusta National Golf Club in Augusta. Rory McIlroy wins for the second straight year, the first golfer to do so since Tiger Woods in 2001–02.
- April 13 – Three people are killed in a series of shootings in DeKalb County. A 26-year-old man is arrested, but he dies in custody on April 21.
- April 21 – A fast-moving wildfire destroys 47 homes in Brantley County.
- April 22 – Governor Kemp declares a state of emergency in 91 counties due to ongoing wildfires in the southern part of the state.

=== May ===
- May 6 – The mayor of Cohutta fires the police chief and all ten officers. The firings are reportedly related to a complaint some officers made regarding the mayor's wife.
- May 11 – Two patients from the MV Hondius hantavirus outbreak are transported to Emory Hospital in Atlanta.
- May 12 – Secretary of State Bradford Raffensperger is targeted by a bomb threat during a gubernatorial campaign event.

=== June ===
- June 11–July 19 – The United States hosts the 2026 FIFA World Cup, with a number of matches being held in Mercedes-Benz Stadium in Atlanta.

=== July ===
- July 17 – The city council of Stockbridge votes to restrict Mayor Jayden Brown's access to city funds, following accusations of misuse. 22-year-old Brown is also banned from any non-public parts of city property.
- July 20 – The federal trial of a Stop Cop City activist accused of destroying property to avoid seizure begins. In January 2025, the activist was detained by Customs and Border Protection at Hartsfield Jackson International Airport over his activism. The activist allegedly used a phone with GrapheneOS and provided agents with a duress password that factory reset the phone when inputed.
- July 24 – Colt Gray, who shot and killed four people at Apalachee High School near Winder in 2024, pleads guilty to all 55 counts he was charged with.
- July 30 – Colin Gray, the father of Colt Gray who gifted his son the rifle he later used in the shooting, is sentenced to 15 years in prison.

=== August ===
- August 7 – ICE announces it has arrested 1,226 people in a multi-day immigration operation in the Atlanta area.
- August 20 – The Georgia Bulldogs women's soccer team sets a new attendance record for collegiate soccer, men's or women's, while hosting the James Madison Dukes at Sanford Stadium in Athens. Georgia beats James Madison 6–0 in the match, which has 25,433 attendees.

=== September ===
- September 13 – The city council of Stockbridge votes 3–0 to remove 23-year-old Mayor Jayden Brown, citing misuse of a city credit card and engaging in explicit communication with a high school student who just turned 18.
- September 27 – 12 teenagers are injured after a shootout at a Macon park during a birthday party.
- September 28 – The National Women's Soccer League announces its 17th franchise, Atlanta City FC.

=== October ===
- October 4 – Two people are killed and 35 injured in a mass shooting in Vienna. The majority of those injured were shot, though some were hit by vehicles while fleeing.
- October 9 – A man kills four people and himself in a shooting at a home in Douglas.
- October 12 – A man falls to his death from the Goliath rollercoaster at Six Flags over Georgia in Cobb County.
- October 19 – The entire Milner Police Department and city manager resign. The resignations are amid a conflict between the department and the mayor, who the police chief accused of planting a tracking device on his truck.
- October 20 – An "incendiary device" is thrown at an ICE building in downtown Atlanta.

=== November ===
- November 3 – 2026 Georgia state elections:
  - 2026 Georgia gubernatorial election: Former mayor of Atlanta Keisha Lance Bottoms wins election, beating billionaire Rick Jackson. Bottoms is the first Black woman to be elected governor of a U.S. state.
  - 2026 Georgia lieutenant gubernatorial election: State Senator Josh McLaurin wins the election, beating State Senator Greg Dolezal.
  - 2026 Georgia Attorney General election: State Representative Tanya Miller wins the election, beating State Senator Brian Strickland.
  - 2026 Georgia Secretary of State election: Penny Brown Reynolds wins the election, beating Tim Fleming.
  - 2026 Georgia Insurance Commissioner election
  - 2026 Georgia Labor Commissioner election
  - 2026 Georgia State Superintendent of Schools election
  - 2026 United States Senate election in Georgia: Jon Ossoff wins reelection, beating Representative Mike Collins.

== Deaths ==
- February 1: John F. Stewart, 99, politician, member of the Georgia House of Representatives (1965–1967).
- April 22: David Scott, 80, U.S. representative for Georgia's 13th congressional district (2003–2026).
- June 9: Anderson Dilworth, 96, politician, member of the Georgia House of Representatives (1959–1960).
- August 10: Ben Jones, 84, actor and former U.S. Representative (1989–1993).

== See also ==
- 2026 in the United States
