= List of years in Georgia =

List of years in Georgia may refer to:

- List of years in Georgia (country)
- List of years in Georgia (U.S. state)
