= 2025 in Georgia =

2025 in Georgia may refer to:

- 2025 in Georgia (country)
- 2025 in Georgia (U.S. state)
