= 2025 Georgia elections =

2025 Georgia elections may refer to:

- 2025 Georgia state elections in the state of Georgia in the United States
- 2025 Georgian local elections in the Eastern European country of Georgia
