= List of killings by law enforcement officers in the United States, October 2023 =

This is a list of people reported killed by non-military law enforcement officers in the United States in October 2023, whether in the line of duty or not, and regardless of reason or method. The listing documents the occurrence of a death, making no implications regarding wrongdoing or justification on the part of the person killed or officer involved. Killings are arranged by date of the incident that caused death. Different death dates, if known, are noted in the description. The table below lists 94 people.

== October 2023 ==
Date	Name (age) of deceased	Race	Location	Description
2023-10-31	Dannon Bryant (43)	Unknown	Spring Valley, Nevada	The Las Vegas Metropolitan Police responded to reports of a stabbing and encountered a suspect holding a knife. A police officer hit the local man with a police car as he walked into a road near an intersection in Spring Valley, and he died on the scene. The stabbing victim later died at the hospital.
2023-10-31	Juan Beltran Sanchez (39)	Latino	San Jacinto, California	A man was shot and killed by officers after brandishing a 1911-style pellet gun while riding a bicycle after leaving a business building.
2023-10-31	Benjamin Arvizo (31)	Unknown	Alamosa, Colorado	Deputies responded to a report of a stolen Honda CR-V at a IHOP parking lot. After arriving at their residence, officers were flagged down by their homeowner. One deputy confronted the suspect, who was armed with a knife. The man was then fatally shot by deputies.
2023-10-31	Sean Dyment (23)	Unknown	Rumford, Maine	Rumford Police officers were talking to a person in front of the Rumford Police station. The person said an unknown stranger was following them. Suddenly, Dyment drove up to the police station and was shot after allegedly "confronting" officers with a rifle.
2023-10-31	Mark Brunson (38)	Unknown	Cottonwood Heights, Utah	A Midvale, Utah man wielding swords was shot and killed by police responding to a domestic violence call.
2023-10-30	Timothy Bentley Thomas Jr. (21)	White	Tok, Alaska	An Alaska State trooper responded to reports of a Northway man trying to break into the Three Bears Tok Motel and encountered Thomas holding an AK-47. One of the two troopers on-scene fatally shot Thomas with a handgun. On October 29, 2025, his family filed a civil lawsuit against the State of Alaska regarding the wrongful death and violation of civil rights stemming from the shooting.
2023-10-29	LaVaughn Coleman (21)	Black	Odenton, Maryland	Coleman died on December 14 from injuries he sustained after being tased by an Anne Arundel County police officer during a foot pursuit while handcuffed. This happened during a traffic stop involving two men with guns and drugs inside the vehicle.
2023-10-29	Christopher H. Whittle (49)	White	Aiken, South Carolina	During the overnight hours, police were called to investigate a man threatening neighbors with a firearm. When deputies arrived, they encountered the man who was barricaded and firing rounds from the residence. Officers opened fire on him, killing him on-scene.
2023-10-29	Abigail Lopez (20)	Latino	Anaheim, California	Lopez was shot and killed at a bus stop on the 1200 block of S. Anaheim Blvd by Anaheim Police officers. She was shot when she pointed a rifle, a BB gun, in their direction.
2023-10-28	Vernard Toney Jr. (13)	Black	Washington, D.C.	An off-duty federal security officer shot and killed Toney after he and another boy allegedly tried to carjack the officer. At the same time, Toney held his hand in his pocket as if he had a gun. The security officer's gun was the only firearm recovered from the scene.
2023-10-28	David Rojas Sr. (53)	Unknown	San Bernardino, California	Officers responded to an armed robbery report in a back parking lot at the National Orange Show. Officers spotted the man after arrival, who had an extensive violent criminal history. Rojas opened fire on officers, causing officers to fire back, fatally killing the man. While canvassing the area in search of witnesses and additional evidence, authorities found a male victim nearby who was suffering from a gunshot wound, but died on-scene.
2023-10-27	Dallas Brandon Cain (51)	Unknown	Somerset, Kentucky	A local man was killed by Kentucky State Police troopers after refusing commands and pointing a handgun towards officers during a domestic violence call.
2023-10-27	Lazaro Enriquez (36)	Unknown	Henderson, Nevada	Police responded to reports of a man cutting himself and vandalizing a home. During the confrontation, Enriquez told police to shoot him and briefly assaulted a nearby civiliastandoffthe standoff an officer tased Enriquez before officers shot and killed him.
2023-10-26	Frederick Davis (37)	Black	Indianapolis, Indiana	At a Burger King parking lot near Eastside and Sycamore Heights, a 37-year-old man with mental health issues was killed by an Indianapolis officer after a trespassing incident turned violent when he briefly ran out of the restaurant and began opening fire on deputies, injuring one of them.
2023-10-26	Gilbert Garibay (73)	Unknown	Merced, California	At around 1 am, Garibay was reportedly jumping in front of passing vehicles on the 3300 Block of M Street. When two Merced Police officers arrived, Garibay allegedly lunged at them with a knife & was then shot.
2023-10-26	unidentified male	Unknown	Clinton, North Carolina	Clinton Police were called to a home regarding a domestic disturbance. While searching the home for the suspect, officers found the male hiding in a closet. Officers fatally shot the man after he allegedly pointed a firearm at one of the officers.
2023-10-26	unidentified male	Unknown	Stockton, California	A vehicle stop turned violent after the man refused to get out of the car, grabbed a knife, got out of his car, and stabbed a K9 in the face before an officer fatally shot the suspect. The man died after arriving at a nearby hospital, and the K9 survived the attack.
2023-10-25	unidentified female	Unknown	Palm Coast, Florida	
2023-10-25	Brand Barry (22)	White	Round Lake Beach, Illinois	
2023-10-25	Christina McKinney (34)	White	Evansville, Indiana	
2023-10-24	Ronald Nelson Jr (54)	Black	Kenwood Estates, Florida	A man was shot and killed by two West Palm Beach deputies after being uncooperative, fighting with deputies, and pulling out a handgun near Kenwood Estates.
2023-10-24	Rasheem Edwards (26)	Black	Silver Springs Shores, Florida	Marion County deputies shot and killed a man during a traffic stop in Silver Springs Shores when the stop turned violent after the man fled from an officer and attempted to reach a weapon.
2023-10-24	unidentified male	Unknown	Kent, Washington	Two males stole a vehicle in a driveway before stating they were out of gas. They arrived at a Chevron gas station near Woodmont Beach before officers were called to a report of a stolen vehicle. One of the two men ran off from the police while holding a knife. After reaching near a residence, an officer opened fire on the fleeing man, killing him. The other suspect surrendered immediately at the gas station.
2023-10-24	Brayden Barnhouse (19)	White	New Pittsburg, Indiana	Randolph County deputies killed a Muncie, Indiana man after producing a Glock 17 handgun and opening fire at them. The incident happened while police responded to an overdose call. Deputies left the overdose scene to find the man's family. The shooting happened after police spotted the man less than two minutes later.
2023-10-24	Darcel Edwards (35)	Black	Indianapolis, Indiana	Following a traffic stop and chase, police surrounded Edwards' vehicle after he crashed. They located Edwards up in a nearby tree, where he told officers to kill him. Standing in a standoff. Police shot Edwards after he allegedly reached for his pocket. Police found a gun holster but no gun on Edwards.
2023-10-23	Kevin G. Foy (34)	White	Germantown, Wisconsin	Police were called to reports of a Lake Villa, Illinois man acting erratically near a middle school. When officers arrived, Foy climbed onto the school's roof and allegedly fired at police. Following a shootout, Foy was killed by officers.
2023-10-23	Jorge Luis Santana-Ramirez (43)	Hispanic/Latino	Pleasant Dale, Nebraska	Seward County deputies tried pulling over a Honda Civic on Interstate 80 when a Hastings, Nebraska man sped off and made a wrong turn. A short pursuit lasted until reaching mile marker 388 in Pleasant Dale. A passenger exited the vehicle, but the driver refused to let them out. A deputy spotted a weapon in his hand before he was shot and killed inside his vehicle.
2023-10-23	Ruben Garcia (34)	Latino	San Antonio, Texas	Officers shot and killed Garcia at an apartment. Police Chief William McManus said an officer chased Garcia after seeing him flashing a gun in his waistband. According to McManus, the officer and Garcia struggled over the gun before the officer stepped back and shot him. One neighbor disputed the police account and claimed Garcia had his hands behind his back when he was shot.
2023-10-22	Daniel Kempf (24)	White	Homestead, Florida	A man with a history of trauma and mental health issues was shot and killed by a female officer after the man confronted the officer with a small kitchen knife. His older brother sobbed as he told the officer that it was his brother.
2023-10-22	unidentified male	Unknown	Austin, Texas	
2023-10-22	unidentified male	Unknown	Vinton, Ohio	A man was killed by law enforcement after attempting to shoot officers while they entered his residence. Deputies fired back, fatally killing him.
2023-10-20	Michael Strenk (48)	White	Prospect, Connecticut	Police responded to reports of a disturbance at a home. Police encountered Strenk, who threw a knife at an officer through a window. Police then shot Strenk after he charged at officers with a second knife. Strenk's death was the third police shooting in Connecticut within a week.
2023-10-20	Marthely Theodore (26)	Unknown	Smyrna, Georgia	Police responded to reports of a man pointing a gun at passing cars. When Cobb County and Smyrna officers arrived, the man immediately pointed his gun at them before being fatally shot afterward.
2023-10-20	William Frank Lee (38)	Unknown	Killeen, Texas	Police responded after a report that Lee had stabbed his brother. Police shot and killed Lee, who allegedly had a knife.
2023-10-19	Arthur Porter (33)	Black	Washington DC	A man is killed, and two DC police officers are injured after a domestic disturbance call involving a gun turned into chaos in the Naylor Gardens area. Officers spotted a man who ran off on foot, prompting a foot pursuit. A man pulled out a pistol and exchanged gunfire with police, injuring one of them. The other officer opened fire on him, killing the suspect. The officer was treated with a gunshot wound in the leg.
2023-10-18	Yong Lin (46)	Asian	Round Lake, Illinois	A woman called the police to report that her friend's relative had possibly committed suicide. Officers entered Lin's home and found him unconscious and bleeding on a mattress. As deputies provided aid, Lin woke up and grabbed a meat cleaver. Police shot Lin as he allegedly ran towards them with the cleaver.
2023-10-17	Todd Pearce (30)	White	Centralia, Illinois	A local man was killed by law enforcement after attempting to stab officers with a knife during a search warrant in the homeowner's basement. One of the officers was taken to a nearby hospital with a knife wound in the shoulder. Authorities confirmed that the suspect was wanted in connection with a violation of a court order after being formally charged with two counts of misdemeanor domestic battery.
2023-10-17	Richard Rodriguez (18)	Unknown	San Antonio, Texas	During a foot pursuit near Brackenridge Academy involving two men in a traffic violation, one of the men pulled out a weapon and turned toward two officers. Both officers shot the man, killing him on-scene.
2023-10-16	Donald Passmore (62)	White	Wallingford, Connecticut	Police responded to a report that Passmore had shot himself and encountered him lying in bed with a revolver. After a confrontation, officers shot Passmore when he allegedly reached for the gun.
2023-10-16	Donald Guffey Jr. (59)	White	New Castle, Indiana	A local man was killed in a SWAT shootout after barricading himself in a house and refusing to talk to police.
2023-10-16	Leonard Cure (53)	Black	Camden County, Georgia	Police pulled over Cure on the I-95 for speeding. Cure was then tased by the officer when he refused to put his hands behind his back. A physical struggle then followed as the officer attempted to arrest him. The officer then fatally shot him. Cure had previously been exonerated for a wrongful conviction in Broward County, Florida in 2020.
2023-10-16	Connor James Hart (27)	White	Silverthorne, Colorado	A Silverthorne officer killed a Denver man after fleeing from police while attempting to carjack near the Summit Place Shopping Center on Route 6.
2023-10-16	unidentified male (33)	White	El Paso, Texas	A shirtless man barricaded at an Upper Valley Speedway gas station for four hours. After chemicals were deployed, the suspect stumbled and ran out of the store. The man briefly pointed a handgun at officers, which caused officers to shoot at the man, killing him.
2023-10-16	Anthony Charles Meyers (35)	White	Union, West Virginia	Police located Meyers in a wooded area, who had been released from a federal prison and was wanted on federal charges and suspected of breaking into three homes across three counties in West Virginia and Virginia. Officers shot and killed Meyers when he allegedly pointed a rifle at police.
2023-10-15	Jamie Grant (44)	Black	Hartford, Connecticut	Police respond to reports of a man in a car threatening people with a gun. Officers pulled the vehicle over when the man in the passenger seat got out and opened fire at an officer. The officer returned fire, killing a man during the shootout.
2023-10-15	Joseph Michael Pate (39)	White	Red Bluff, California	While a California Highway Patrol officer investigated a disabled vehicle on Interstate 5 near mile marker 622, a vehicle driven by a Pittsburg, California man crashed at the scene, nearly hitting an officer. The man got out of the car, pulled out a rifle, and fired at the officer. The officer fought back before the man carjacked the officer's vehicle and then crashed into a passing semi-truck. The truck rolled onto its side, and the suspect was killed on-scene. The officer suffered serious injuries from gunfire, but recovered.
2023-10-14	Sharron Sangster Lee (49)	Black	Shelby County, Tennessee	A sheriff's deputy killed his wife, a corrections officer, and himself in a murder-suicide.
2023-10-14	Kyle Paul Joshua Massie (34)	Unknown	Fond Du Lac, Wisconsin	Massie, a Hancock, Michigan man, sexually assaulted a woman, then proceeded to lead Fond Du Lac SO on a chase and engaged in a gunfight, during which he was killed. K-9 Iro was critically injured in the shootout.
2023-10-14	unidentified male	Unknown	De Leon, Texas	
2023-10-14	George Holland (68)	White	Sikeston, Missouri	Police responded to reports of an armed man at an Alcoholics Anonymous meeting. A standoff, police shot and killed the man.
2023-10-13	Geoffrey Walker (30)	Black	Decatur, Georgia	
2023-10-12	Jesus Herman Madera-Duran (18)	Unknown	Philadelphia, Pennsylvania	Madera-Duran and several others were breaking into vehicles at a Philadelphia International Airport parking garage when two officers confronted them. The thieves and police entered a shootout, ending with both Madera-Duran and Officer Richard Mendez being shot. Mendez was taken to the hospital, where he died, while Madera-Duran was dropped off at another hospital, where he also died.
2023-10-12	Ricco Acevedo (45)	Latino	Youngstown, Ohio	Police responded to a report of a man stealing several bikes and a truck beforehand. Officers arrived at a southside house owned by a man who is serving time at the Mahoning County Jail. After the man gave false information to the police, he was detained, but as the police attempted to handcuff him, the man ran off. The man pulled out a handgun while running upstairs. The man told officers to shoot him three times, which was his wish. The officer struck the man three times, killing him on-scene. Police reported that the man was suicidal following the death of his mother.
2023-10-12	unidentified male	Unknown	Huntsville, Texas	Police responded to an apartment complex near Interstate 45 for a report of a man acting erratically and brandishing a firearm. After police made contact with the man, there was an exchange of gunfire, injuring an officer. Other officers returned fire, killing the suspect. The officer was transported to a Conroe hospital in critical condition, but survived.
2023-10-11	Arnicious Odom Jr (20)	Black	Miami, Florida	
2023-10-11	Tyler McCleve (33)	White	Fairfield, Utah	A Pleasant Grove, Utah man accidentally shot himself in the leg near Manning Canyon, which led officers to respond. When deputies arrived on-scene, the man allegedly pointed a weapon at officers. After refusing orders to lower his weapon, the man was fatally shot by the police.
2023-10-11	Idelonso Janeiro Rodríguez (83)	Latino	Isabela, Puerto Rico	A Puerto Rican police officer, José Miguel Centeno Sánchez, killed Rodríguez and Cruzado at their home, where he had been employed as a handyman. Sánchez committed suicide as a SWAT team arrived at his home.
2023-10-11	Angélica Adorno Cruzado (77)	Latino	Isabela, Puerto Rico	A Puerto Rican police officer, José Miguel Centeno Sánchez, killed Rodríguez and Cruzado at their home, where he had been employed as a handyman. Sánchez committed suicide as a SWAT team arrived at his home.
2023-10-10	Thomas Evans (58)	White	Bonifay, Florida	At a Chevron gas station, a Holmes County deputy pulled over a vehicle for a license lack and took the man for verification. While being told if he had drugs or guns in his car, the man nervously tried to run off. The deputy grabbed his arms to keep him from fleeing. The man tried to reach a handgun through his pocket, which led to a tackle to the ground. The man attempted to shoot the deputy, but the deputy fired back, killing the man.
2023-10-10	Michael Bajorek (32)	Unknown	Sarasota, Florida	A low-speed pursuit between Sarasota deputies and a gray 2009 Honda Civic ended with a PIT maneuver. The deputy attempted to approach the suspect on foot, but the man drove at the deputy, pinning him between the Civic and the police car. The man in the Civic then turned around and attempted to hit him again, but the officer opened fire on the man. The suspect was killed on-scene, and the car narrowly missed a tree.
2023-10-10	Alan Weber (54)	White	Elwood, New York	Police responded to Weber's home after a report of a man acting violently. When officers arrived, Weber, a former professional fencer, allegedly approached them wearing a fencing mask and holding a sword. Police tased Weber, then shot him when he allegedly charged at them.
2023-10-10	Caleb D. Hooten (22)	Black	Fort Valley, Georgia	A traffic stop involving a Honda Accord EX driven by a Warner Robins, Georgia man turned into a short pursuit after he refused to get out of his Accord and sped off from police. After arriving at the Marvin Garden Apartments, the man got out of the car, ran into the woods, and pulled out a gun. A deputy opened fire on the man, killing him on-scene.
2023-10-09	Steven Zalewski (68)	White	East Syracuse, New York	Zalewski, a Syracuse man, was struck and killed by a DeWitt police car responding to an unrelated call near Interstate 690.
2023-10-09	John Beaudoin (67)	White	Pahrump, Nevada	Nye County deputies fatally shot a local man after firing his gun four times at deputies during a nearly four-hour barricade event.
2023-10-09	Joshua Kersey (30)	White	Antioch, Tennessee	Police responded to a report of an intoxicated man holding another man at knifepoint. Prior to officers arriving on-scene, the man began arguing with his family before grabbing a knife from the kitchen and running upstairs. After officers arrived on-scene, officers tried to negotiate with the man for 40 minutes until they heard another man struggling and making a loud noise in one of the upstairs bedrooms. One of the officers kicked the door open and told the man to put the knife down, before officers fatally shot him.
2023-10-09	Zhanyuan Yang (31)	Asian	San Francisco, California	Yang drove a blue mid-2010s Honda Civic through the entrance of the Chinese Consulate in San Francisco. According to a witness, Yang then exited the vehicle and shouted, "Where is the CCP?" Police shot and killed Yang, who they stated had a crossbow and knives.
2023-10-08	James Kenneth Cook (58)	Unknown	Rossville, Georgia	A local man had an outstanding warrant for his arrest on charges that he sexually exploited a child. Walker County deputies arrived at the house and allowed the officers to enter. The man then locked himself in his bedroom. After officers barged through the door, the man opened fire on deputies, critically injuring one, but he survived. Officers returned fire, killing him instantly.
2023-10-08	Mary Meister (69)	White	Willow Grove, Pennsylvania	
2023-10-08	Zachary James Veitch (50)	White	Rice Lake, Wisconsin	Police responded to a report of a stabbing at the Riverside Arms apartments. According to law enforcement, a local man stabbed a female victim six times before running upstairs to his room. The victim survived the attack as officers immediately tried to get him out of the room. The man got out and began charging towards an officer with a knife. Officers opened fire on Veitch, killing him. Police reported that Veitch attempted to stab a male victim but was protected by self-defense.
2023-10-07	Kenneth R. Blevins, Jr. (43)	White	Menasha, Wisconsin	Officers from both Menasha and Fox Crossing responded to a domestic dispute report involving a Chicago man armed with bladed weapons. One Menasha officer discharged a firearm during the incident, fatally striking the male subject. The Menasha officer was immediately placed on administrative leave following the use of weaponry on the white man.
2023-10-07	Jeremy Robert Rollenhagen (37)	White	Adolphus, Kentucky	A Smiths Grove man was shot and killed by police after a pursuit that ended with a shootout between Adolphus and Scottsville. The man was killed, but an officer was transported to a nearby hospital in stable condition.
2023-10-07	Ricardo Jose Fuentes (17)	Latino	Corpus Christi, Texas	Police killed a teenage boy after he allegedly ran towards a moving car and fatally shot an 18-year-old man with a pistol, who died from his injuries after arriving at a nearby hospital. An officer spotted the boy and fatally shot him on-scene.
2023-10-07	Oscar Vasquez Lopez (44)	Unknown	Los Angeles, California	A traffic stop involving a first-generation GMC Sierra at a CVS Pharmacy parking lot in the Canoga Park area turned into bloodshed after a LAPD officer fatally shot a man after he was found asleep with a gun in his waistband. The escalation was initially cleared of wrongdoing by oversight officials.
2023-10-06	unidentified male	Unknown	Shiprock, New Mexico	Farmington Police responded to a report of a man barricading himself in a trailer. Five standoffs turned tragic when officers spotted flames inside the trailer. The suspect immediately got out of the trailer with a weapon in his hand before being fatally shot by one officer.
2023-10-05	unidentified male	Unknown	Auburndale, Florida	Police responded to a report of a stolen 2011 Kia Sorrento from a Circle K. A 10-50 call happened a minute later after the stolen Sorrento collided with a Toyota Corolla (E210) on U.S. Route 92. The man got out of the car and attempted to charge and punch an officer, but got tased. More officers later arrived, including a Polk County deputy, as the man continued to resist, pulled out a taser probe, and allegedly began threatening officers with a knife. A K9 was deployed, but the suspect fought it off. The suspect continued to approach the officers with a knife, but the officers had no choice. Officers assassinated the man, killing him on-scene.
2023-10-06	Jeffrey Severn (54)	White	Cut Bank, Montana	Police responded to a protection order violation and found Severn attempting to enter a home with a rifle. Following a pursuit and traffic stop, an officer shot Severn after he allegedly exited his vehicle, wielding a rifle.
2023-10-05	unidentified female	Unknown	Moorestown, Michigan	
2023-10-04	unidentified male	Unknown	Childress, Texas	A pursuit that started in the northwest part of Childress ended in gunfire after the suspect rammed a patrol car.
2023-10-04	Michael Hwang (42)	Asian	Philadelphia, Pennsylvania	According to police, Hwang and his 12-year-old son were playing video games in the Rhawnhurst area when they got into an argument. When the boy's uncle attempted to intervene, Hwang shot him in the face. As police arrived on the scene, Hwang shot at them, injuring three officers, before police shot and killed him. Police said Hwang was wearing a bulletproof vest and had extra ammunition at the time. The three officers were expected to recover, and the boy's uncle was listed in critical but stable condition.
2023-10-04	Nicholas Demar Lopez (44)	Black	Charlotte, North Carolina	Police responded to a report of a man firing a gun in a street in the Seversville area. After officers arrived, the man attempted to walk away but then turned to face the officers. An officer fatally struck the suspect, killing him. The officer was placed on paid administrative leave.
2023-10-03	Joseph Potts (34)	White	Taylorsville, Utah	A West Valley City, Utah intoxicated and suicidal man was killed in a long standoff with police during a domestic violence incident involving a female victim wrestling the man's gun away from him and escaping unharmed with their infant child. Potts exited the home wearing a ballistic plate carrier and carrying an AR-15-style semi-automatic rifle before officers gunned the man down.
2023-10-03	Robert Singleton (66)	Unknown	Ballantine, Montana	
2023-10-03	Randy Sharpe Jr (30)	Black	Jacksonville, Florida	
2023-10-03	John Cicalo (33)	White	Lawrenceville, Georgia	
2023-10-03	Teresa Gomez (45)	Latino	Las Cruces, New Mexico	An officer approached Gomez and a man as they sat in a parked vehicle. After angrily confronting the man over trespassing and stating he would arrest him, the officer shot Gomez as she attempted to drive away.
2023-10-03	Luis Muñoz (29)	Unknown	Anaheim, California	
2023-10-02	Shawn Thomas (55)	White	Hubbard, Ohio	
2023-10-02	Sylvester Selby (44)	Black	Manteo, North Carolina	
2023-10-02	Christopher Jones (24)	Unknown	Mobile, Alabama	
2023-10-02	Jahad Snead (41)	Black	Philadelphia, Pennsylvania	
2023-10-01	Richard Johnson (35)	Unknown	Jonesboro, Georgia	
2023-10-01	Donald Bonner Jr (46)	Black	Ailey, Georgia	
2023-10-01	Matthew Rose (30)	Unknown	Knoxville, Tennessee	
2023-10-01	unidentified male	Unknown	Westminster, Colorado	

== See also ==
- Death in custody § United States
- Henry A. Wallace Police Crime Public Database
- List of cases of police brutality
- List of countries with annual rates and counts for killings by law enforcement officers
- List of law enforcement officers killed in the line of duty in the United States
- List of law enforcement officers convicted for an on-duty killing in the United States
- List of shootings by US immigration agents
- List of police reforms related to the George Floyd protests
- List of unarmed African Americans killed by law enforcement officers in the United States
- Lists of killings by law enforcement officers
- Police brutality in the United States
- Police misconduct § United States
- Police riot § United States
- Police use of deadly force in the United States
