= 2024 in Georgia =

2024 in Georgia may refer to:

- 2024 in Georgia (country)
- 2024 in Georgia (U.S. state)
