= 2022 in Georgia =

2022 in Georgia may refer to:

- 2022 in Georgia (country)
- 2022 in Georgia (U.S. state)
