= 2023 in Georgia =

2023 in Georgia may refer to:

- 2023 in Georgia (country)
- 2023 in Georgia (U.S. state)
