= Mary Frances Williams =

American politician (born 1955)

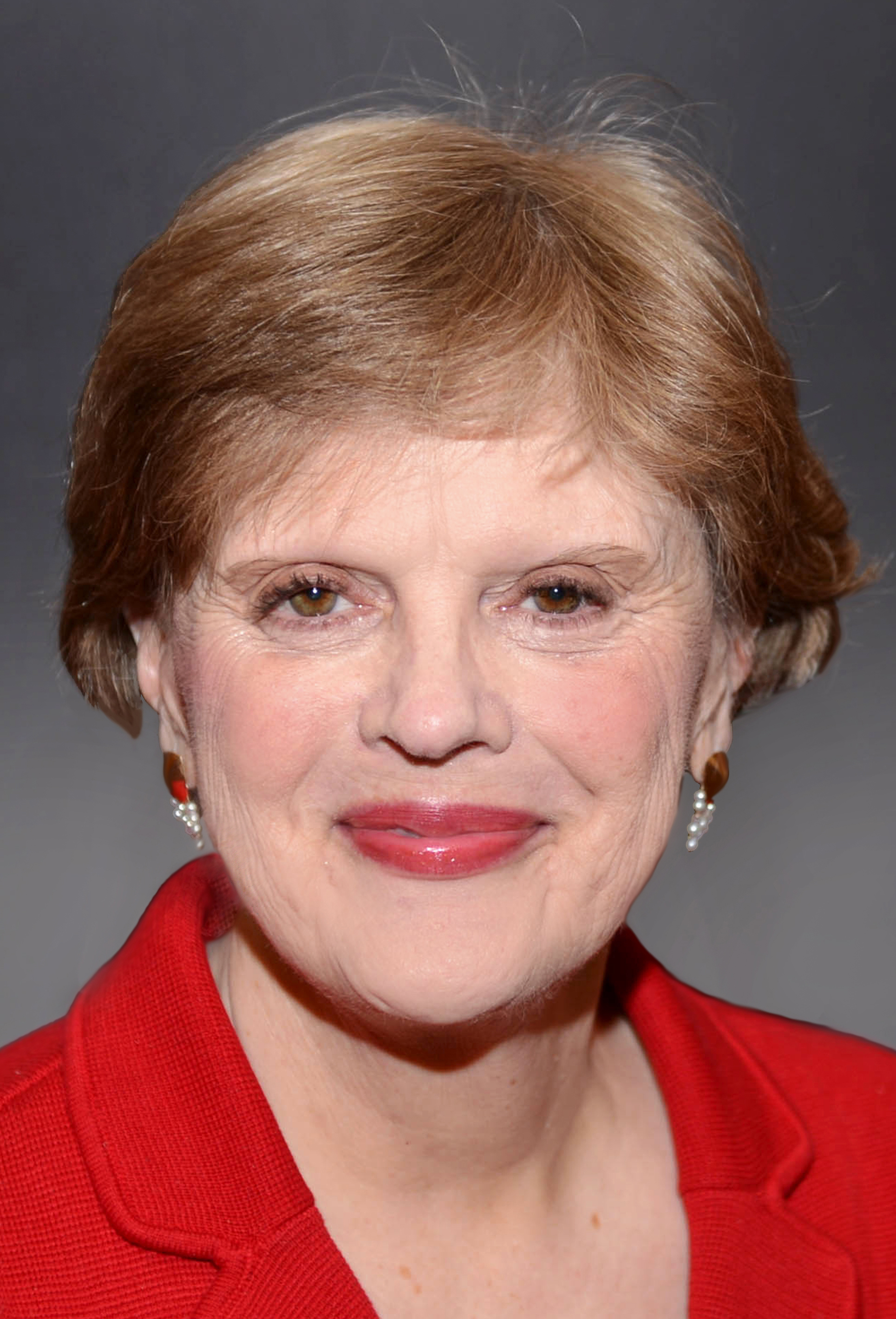

Member of the Georgia House of Representatives from the 37th district
- Incumbent
- Assumed office January 14, 2019
- Preceded by: Sam Teasley

Personal details
- Born: June 26, 1955 (age 71)
- Party: Democratic
- Website: Campaign website

Mary Frances Williams (born June 26, 1955) is an American politician. She serves as a member of the Georgia House of Representatives for District 37 since 2019. On November 8, 2018, she defeated the Republican Sam Teasley in a closely contested election. During the 2018 United States elections, Williams listed access to healthcare as her number one priority as a would-be legislator. She also stated that she supported universal background check as a prerequisite to gun ownership and keeping guns out of hands of domestic violence offenders.
