= Georgia's 119th House of Representatives district =

State district in Georgia, USA

Georgia's 119th State House of Representatives district
Representative
Holt Persinger; R–Winder
- Demographics: 77.1% White; 11.3% Black; 4.0% Hispanic; 5.9% Asian
- Population: 56,067

District 119 elects one member of the Georgia House of Representatives. It contains parts of Barrow County and Jackson County.

== Members ==
- Sue Burmeister (until 2007)
- Barbara Sims (2007– 2013)
- Chuck Williams (until 2017)
- Jonathan Wallace (2017–2019)
- Marcus Wiedower (2019–2023)
- Holt Persinger (since 2023)
