= South Fulton, Georgia =

City in Georgia, United States

South Fulton, Georgia Renaissance, Georgia
- City
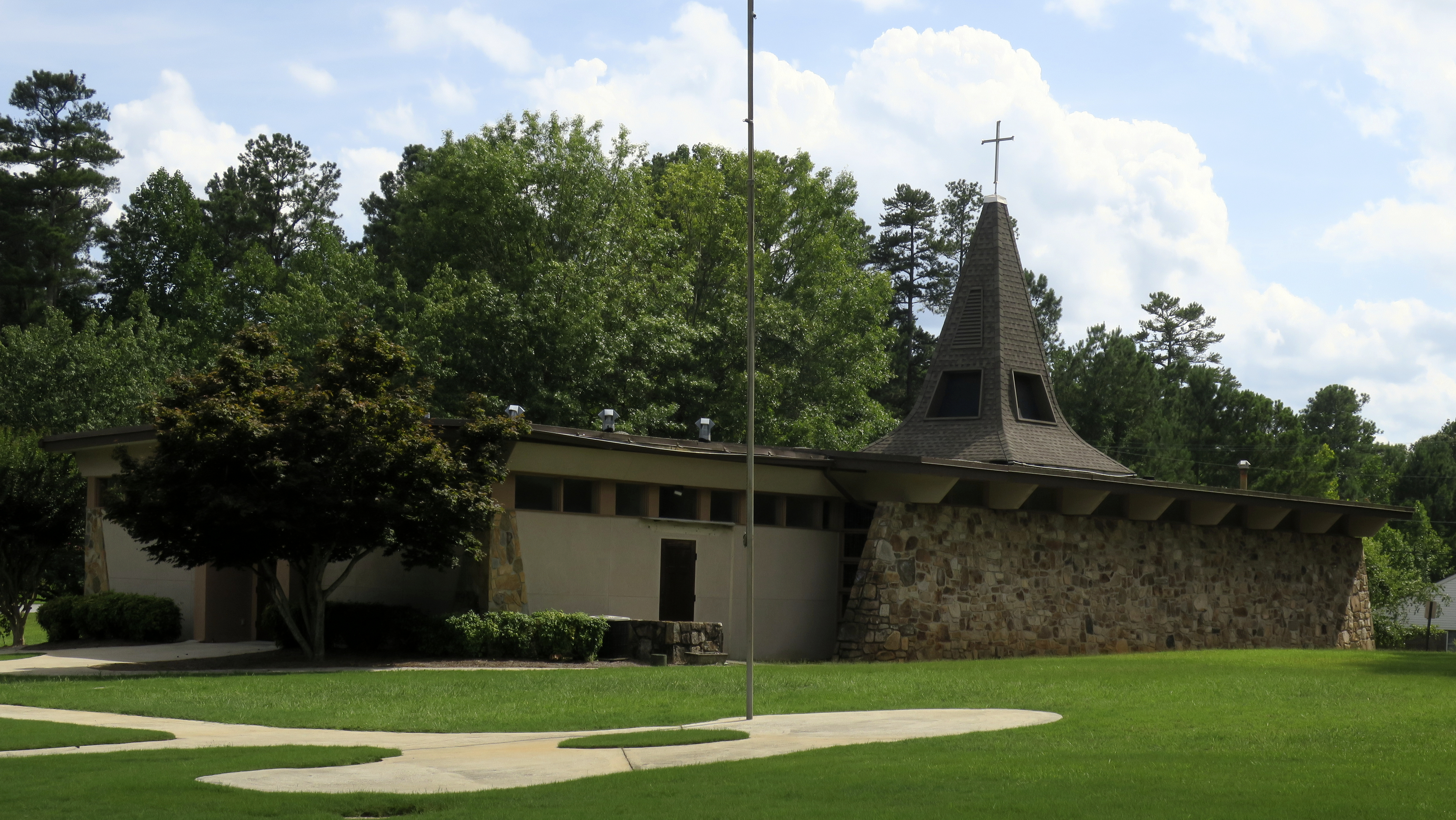

- Flag Seal Logo

- Location in Fulton County and the state of Georgia

- Location of South Fulton in Metro Atlanta
- Coordinates: 33°35′33″N 84°40′23″W
- Country: United States
- State: Georgia
- County: Fulton
- Established: May 1, 2017

Government
  - Mayor: Carmalitha Gumbs (D)

Area
  - Total: 86.26 sq mi (223.40 km^{2})
  - Land: 85.22 sq mi (220.71 km^{2})
  - Water: 1.04 sq mi (2.69 km^{2})
- Elevation: 797 ft (243 m)

Population (2020)
  - Total: 107,436
  - Rank: 293rd in the United States; 8th in Georgia
  - Density: 1,260.8/sq mi (486.78/km^{2})
- Time zone: UTC−5 (Eastern (EST))
  - Summer (DST): UTC−4 (EDT)
- FIPS code: 13-72122
- GNIS feature ID: 2786574
- Website: cityofsouthfultonga.gov

South Fulton is a city in Fulton County, Georgia, in the Atlanta metropolitan area of the United States. The city was incorporated in 2017 from parts of southwest Fulton County and includes the communities of Red Oak, Cooks Crossing, Stonewall, Fife, Ben Hill, Sandtown, Cliftondale, Ono, Cedar Grove, Boat Rock/Dry Pond, Maude, Lester, Enon, Welcome All, Peters Woods, and part of Campbellton. As of 2020, it had a population of 107,436, making it the state's eighth-largest city in population. According to the 2020 census, South Fulton had the highest percentage of African American residents among U.S. cities with a population over 100,000, exceeding the proportions in Detroit and Jackson.

== History ==
Creek people and Cherokee people are indigenous to the area.

The 2016 Georgia General Assembly passed bill HB514 to incorporate the city. Governor Nathan Deal signed the bill into law on April 29, 2016. On November 8, 2016, 59% of the citizens of what would become South Fulton voted to charter the city. This referendum was part of a "cityhood movement" in the Atlanta metropolitan area that began in 2005 with the incorporation of Sandy Springs on the north side of Atlanta. Several other communities in Fulton voted to incorporate in 2007.

With the passage of the South Fulton referendum in 2016, Fulton County became the first county in Georgia with no unincorporated residential areas. As a result, in 2017, Fulton County also became the first county in Georgia to cease providing municipal services such as fire, police, zoning, and code enforcement. Many former Fulton County personnel and facilities were transferred to the City of South Fulton.

On March 21, 2017, South Fulton held elections for mayor and city council, followed by runoff elections before incorporation took effect on May 1, 2017.

The first mayor of South Fulton was Bill Edwards, who had previously served on the Fulton County Board of Commissioners from 2000 to 2014. His term expired on December 31, 2021.

In November 2017, after a one-year waiting period mandated by state law, the city council selected Renaissance as the new name for the city after allowing residents to suggest names. More than 200 names had been submitted, and the list had been pared to 20, including Campbellton (a historical town now partly within the city), Atlanta Heights, Wolf Creek, and (still) South Fulton. Following a three-week public notice period and two regular public meetings—which are required to amend the city charter—the city council approved the name change in December 2017. However, Mayor Edwards vetoed the name change on December 18, citing several reasons, including contracts and some public opposition.

During the first eight months of incorporation, the city established its infrastructure and began assuming service responsibilities previously managed by Fulton County.

In 2023, it was announced that approximately 700 acres along Old National Highway, one of the primary commercial corridors in the city, were set for major revitalization. The revitalization project is scheduled to be completed by 2028.

== Demographics ==
Historical population
Census	Pop.	Note	%±
2020	107,436		—
2025 (est.)	112,820	▲	5.0%
U.S. Decennial Census; 2020; 2025

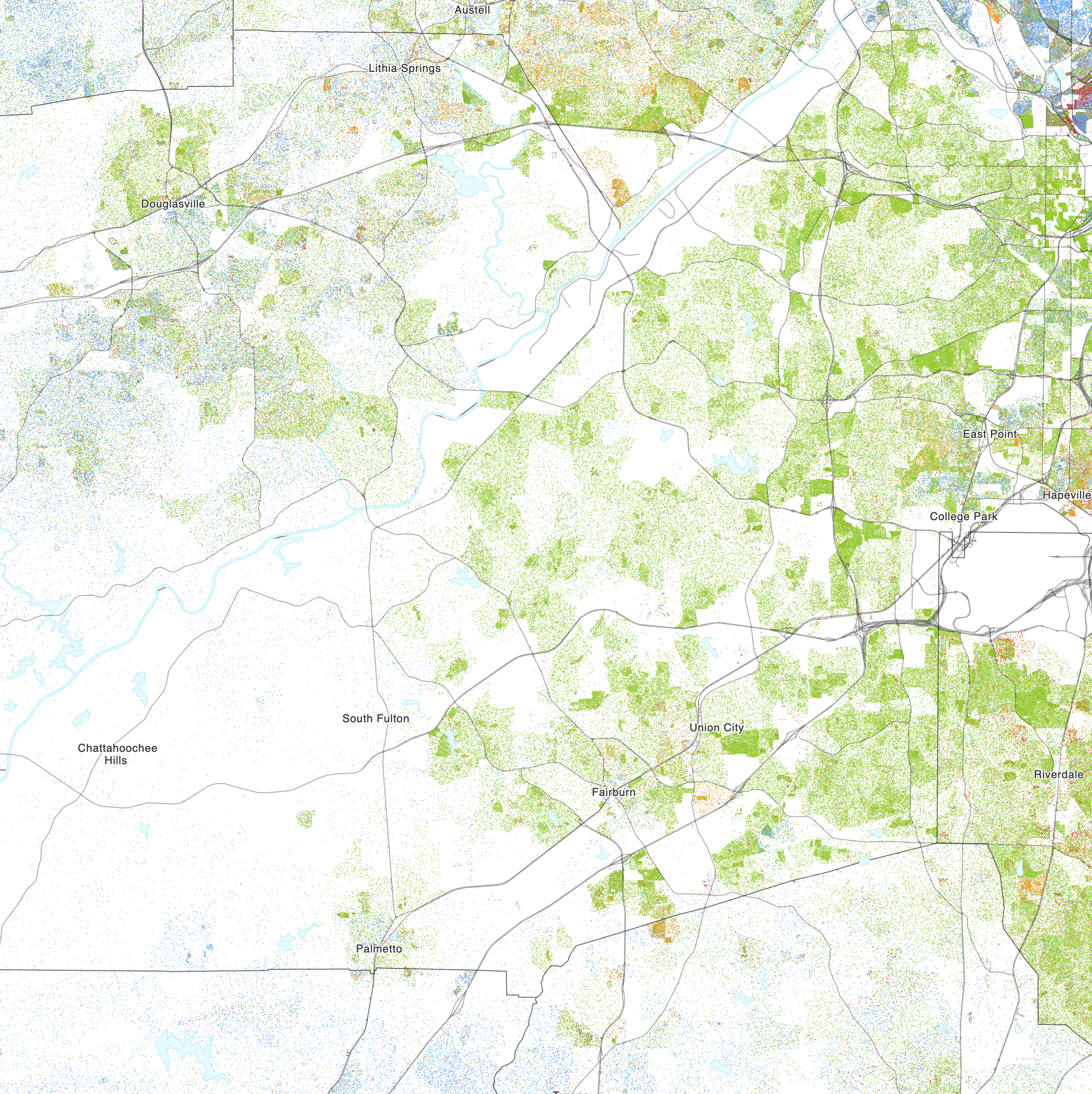
Map of racial distribution in South Fulton, 2020 U.S. census. Each dot is one person: ⬤ White ⬤ Black ⬤ Asian ⬤ Hispanic ⬤ Multiracial ⬤ Native American/Other

South Fulton city, Georgia – racial and ethnic composition Note: The U.S. Census treats Hispanic/Latino as an ethnic category. This table excludes Latinos from the racial categories and assigns them to a separate category. Hispanics/Latinos may be of any race.
Race / Ethnicity (NH = Non-Hispanic)	Pop 2020	% 2020
White alone (NH)	3,402	3.17%
Black or African American alone (NH)	96,463	89.79%
Native American or Alaska Native alone (NH)	148	0.14%
Asian alone (NH)	459	0.43%
Native Hawaiian or Pacific Islander alone (NH)	33	0.03%
Other race alone (NH)	729	0.68%
Mixed race or Multiracial (NH)	2,674	2.49%
Hispanic or Latino (any race)	3,528	3.28%
Total	107,436	100.00%

South Fulton was first listed in the 2020 U.S. census. As of that census, its population was 107,436. South Fulton had a racial and ethnic composition of approximately 90% Black or African American.

== Government ==
South Fulton operates with a weak-mayor form of government, meaning that the mayor's executive powers are limited, and the council can prevent the mayor from supervising city administration. South Fulton's mayor votes only in the case of a tied council vote. The council is primarily responsible for creating and adopting policy via ordinances, resolutions, and amendments. Council members also approve proposed projects, services, events, and purchases above a specified dollar amount. South Fulton's city manager, who reports to the council, manages the city's day-to-day operations and supervises department heads.

As of 2026, the city's departments include city clerk, city manager, public affairs, Code Enforcement, Community Development and Regulatory Affairs, Economic Development, Finance, Fire Rescue, Human Resources, Information Technology, legal, Municipal Court, Parks & Recreation, Cultural Affairs, Police, and Public Works. Additional services, including utilities, sanitation, elections, and public health, are managed by Fulton County or private providers. All public schools within the city are managed by Fulton County Schools.

=== Khalid Kamau controversy ===
Khalid Kamau was elected mayor of South Fulton in 2021. Kamau has described himself as the first Black Lives Matter organizer elected to public office in the United States. During his tenure, Kamau faced significant public and legal scrutiny involving both financial misconduct and criminal charges. In 2025, an independent audit by Baker Tilly alleged that Kamau misused approximately $70,000 in taxpayer funds for unauthorized expenses, including international travel to Ghana and luxury office items, leading the city council to revoke his access to municipal buildings. In parallel with these fiscal controversies, Kamau was arrested in July 2023 for entering a private lake house that he claimed to believe was abandoned; while an initial burglary charge was dropped, he was formally charged with criminal trespass. After rejecting a plea deal in late 2025, Kamau—who was heavily defeated in his re-election bid that November—is scheduled to stand trial for the misdemeanor charge on February 17, 2026. Kamau was succeeded by Carmalitha Gumbs on December 2, 2025.

== Education ==
=== Primary and secondary schools ===
The Fulton County School System serves the city. The majority of students in the city attend schools in the Westlake Cluster.

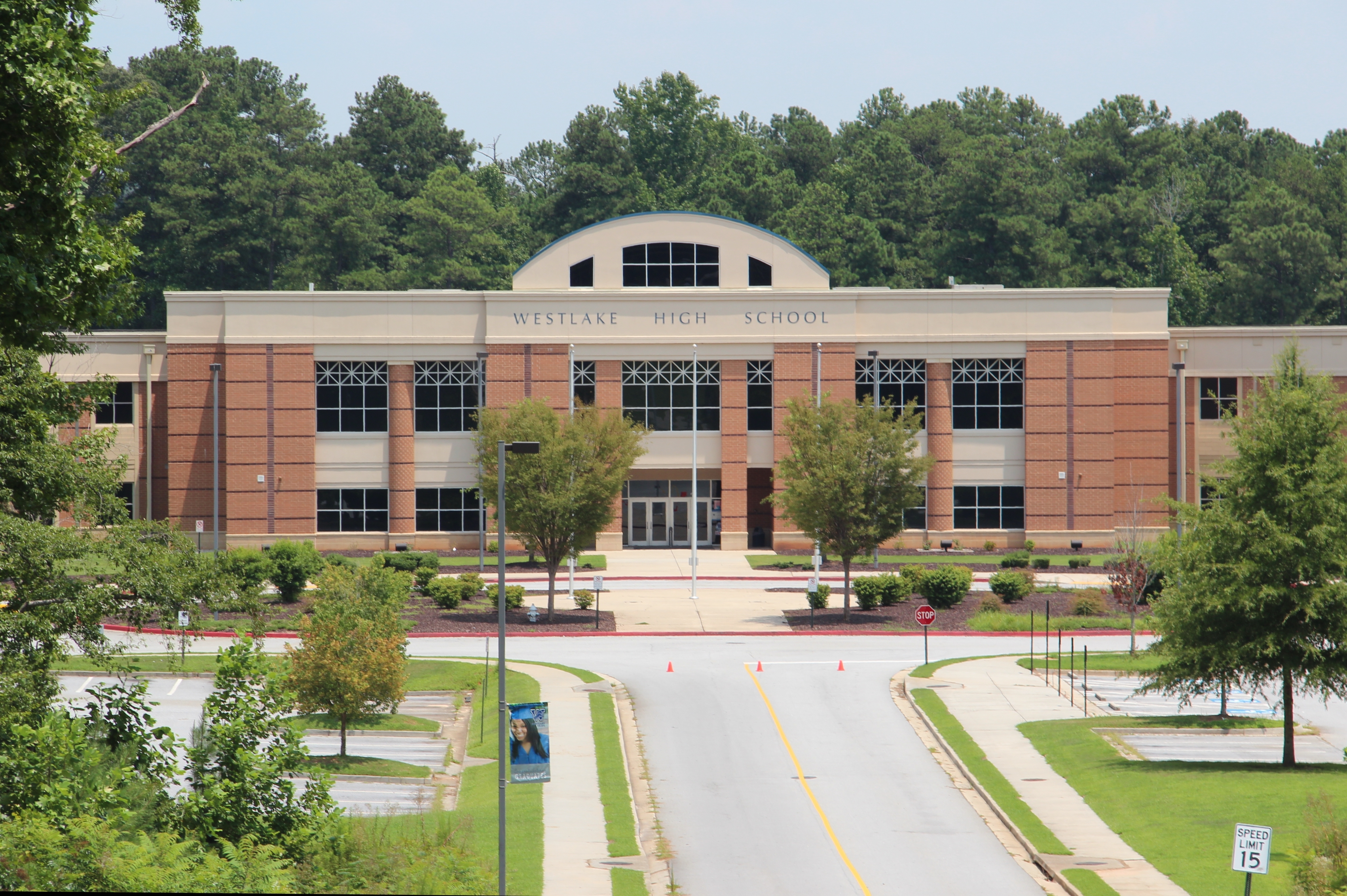
Westlake High School

Westlake Cluster

- Westlake High School
- Camp Creek Middle School
- Seaborn Lee Elementary School
- Frank D. McClarin Success Academy
- A. Philip Randolph Elementary School
- Sandtown Middle School
- Stonewall Tell Elementary School

Other Fulton County clusters serving parts of South Fulton include Banneker, Creekside, and Langston Hughes.

== Parks and recreation ==
The City of South Fulton Parks & Recreation Department manages 17 parks covering approximately 692 acres, offering a range of recreational amenities including athletic fields, gymnasiums, tennis centers, aquatic facilities, and walking trails. Additionally, the department oversees various community programs, youth sports leagues, and senior activities. Parks in the city include Burdett Park, Sandtown Park, and Welcome All Park.

== Arts and culture ==
The Department of Cultural Affairs oversees the city's artistic and cultural programming. The department manages cultural venues and supports public art initiatives.

=== Southwest Arts Center ===
Established in 2001, the Southwest Arts Center serves as South Fulton's primary hub for arts education and performance. The center includes a professional exhibition gallery, classrooms, and a theater that hosts performances ranging from community productions to nationally recognized shows.

=== Wolf Creek Amphitheater ===
The Wolf Creek Amphitheater is an outdoor performance venue, situated on a 435-acre wooded site. With a seating capacity of 5,420, it features reserved seating, general-admission lawn space, and VIP table sections.

== Public libraries ==
The Atlanta–Fulton Public Library System operates in South Fulton.
