= 2023 in Georgia (U.S. state) =

- Decades: 2000s; 2010s; 2020s
- See also: History of Georgia (U.S. state); Historical outline of Georgia (U.S. state); List of years in Georgia (U.S. state); 2023 in the United States

The following is a list of events of the year 2023 in Georgia.

== Incumbents ==
=== State government ===
- Governor: Brian Kemp (R)

== Events ==
- January 8 – Three teenagers and an adult are injured in a drive-by shooting while playing basketball near Driskell Park.
- January 12 – A significant tornado outbreak impacted the Southeastern United States, with fourteen forming in Georgia alone. Due to this outbreak, hundreds of trees were uprooted or snapped in the state. As a result, the outbreak produced one fatality in Butts County, which occurred when a 5-year-old was crushed by an uprooted tree.
- January 18 – Venezuelan environmental activist and eco-anarchist Manuel Esteban Paez Terán is fatally shot by Georgia State Patrol Troopers, after one of the latter was wounded during a raid of the Stop Cop City encampment earlier that day.
- May 3 – 24-year-old Deion Patterson shoots five people at a Northside Hospital facility in Midtown Atlanta, killing one and critically injuring three more before fleeing the scene.
- July 15 – A man fatally shoots four of his neighbors in Hampton. He flees and is later killed in a police shoot-out that injures two officers.
- August 14 – Former President of the United States Donald Trump is indicted by a grand jury in Atlanta for 13 criminal charges, which included violating the state's RICO act, soliciting a public officer to violate their oath, conspiring to impersonate a public officer, conspiring to commit forgery in the first degree, and conspiring to file false documents.
- August 31 – Hurricane Idalia enters Southeastern Georgia as a high-end tropical storm with sustained winds of 70 mph (115 km/h). As a result, one fatality occurred in Valdosta when a man was killed by a fallen tree while helping two sheriff's deputies clear debris from a road. Elsewhere, in Bulloch County, flooding caused by Idalia severely impacted four county roads, with damage estimated at $360,080.
- September 25 – The Art Institute of Atlanta publicly announces the closure of all of their remaining campuses, one of which was in Georgia, due to low enrollment since the COVID-19 pandemic began.
- October 1 – Peachtree Sports Network is launched on WPCH-TV, focusing on local sports programming.
- October 16 – Leonard Cure, a 53-year-old African-American man, is fatally shot during a physical struggle by a sheriff's deputy in Camden County, after being pulled over for speeding.

== See also ==
- 2023 in the United States
