= 2025 Marietta mayoral election =

Mayoral election in Georgia

- November 4, 2025
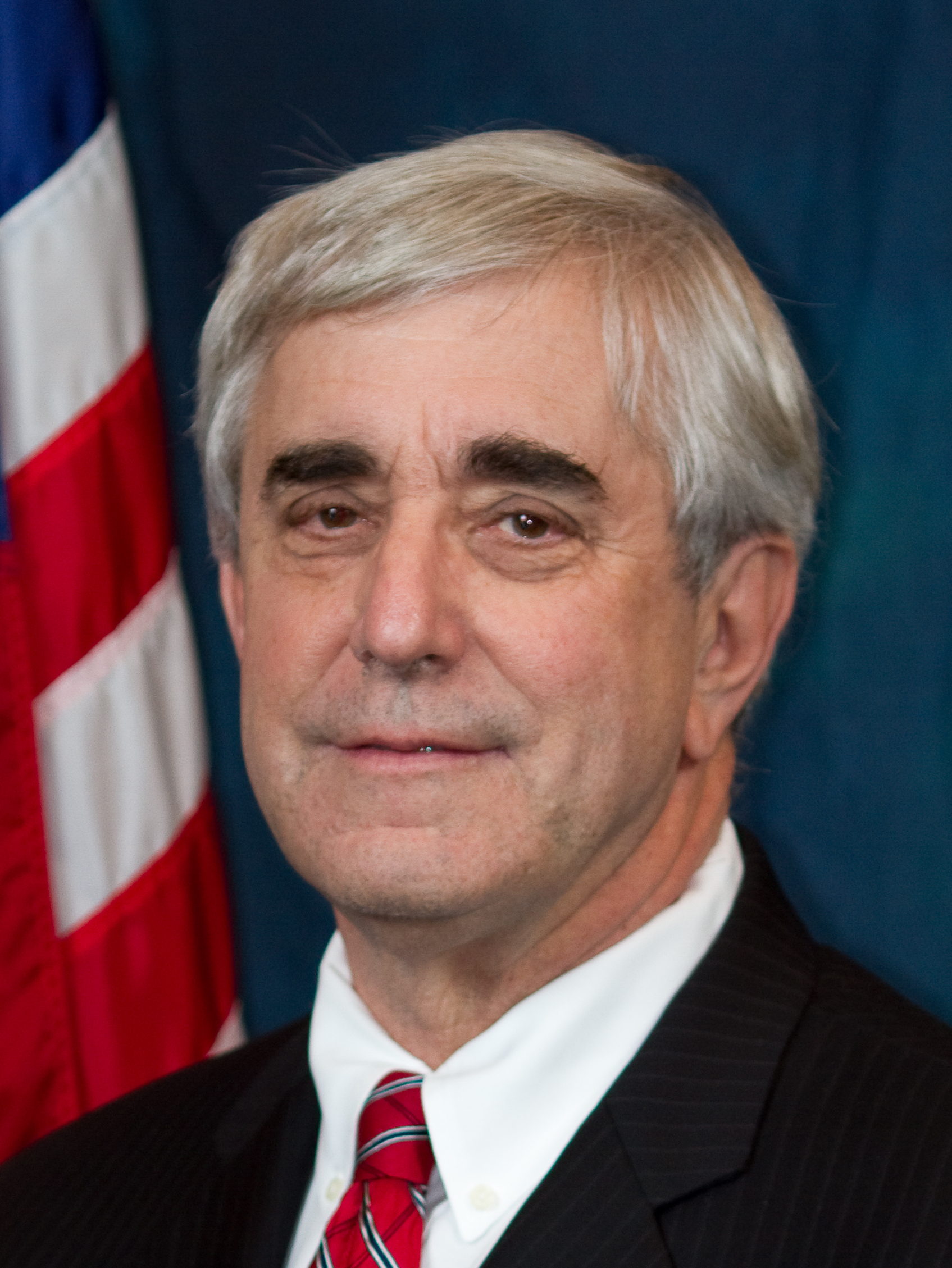

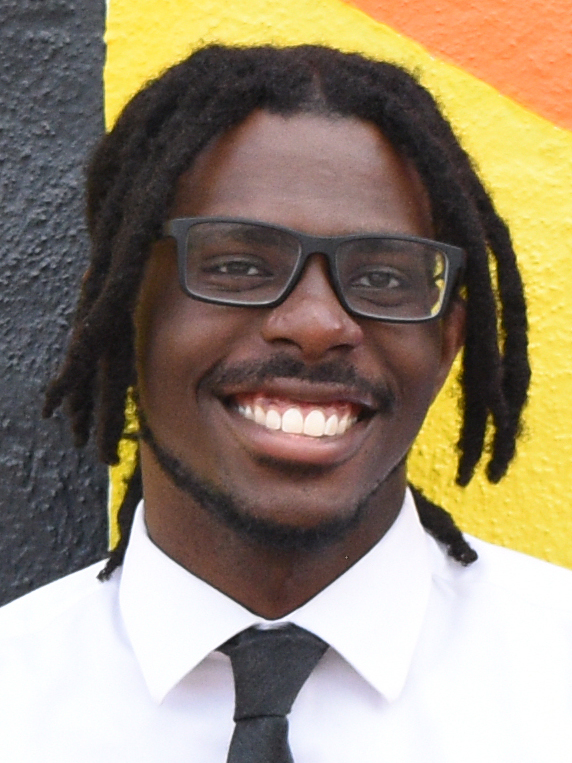
Candidate	Steve Tumlin	Sam Foster
Party	Nonpartisan	Nonpartisan
Popular vote	6,762	6,675
Percentage	50.3%	49.7%
Mayor before election
Steve Tumlin
Nonpartisan
Elected mayor
Steve Tumlin
Nonpartisan

The 2025 Marietta mayoral election was held on November 4, 2025, to elect the mayor of Marietta, Georgia. Incumbent mayor Steve Tumlin was re-elected to a fifth term.

== Candidates ==
=== Declared ===
- Sam Foster, IT systems engineer and activist
- Steve Tumlin, incumbent mayor

=== Withdrawn ===
- Sully Diaz, community organizer (ran for city council)

== Campaign ==
Tumlin launched his re-election campaign in early August 2025, focusing on affordable housing as a campaign issue. Foster entered the race as one of the youngest mayoral candidates in Marietta's history, at 24 years old. As Tumlin is 78, Foster focused his campaign on the generational differences between the two, promising to bring "new and different leadership." Foster used platforms such as TikTok and Instagram to promote his campaign.

== Endorsements ==
Sam Foster

State legislators

- Lisa Campbell, state representative from the 35th district (2023–present)
- Gabriel Sanchez, state representative from the 42nd district (2025–present)
- Ruwa Romman, state representative from the 97th district (2023–present)

Party chapters

- Cobb County Democratic Party

Organizations

- Collective PAC
- Jane Fonda Climate PAC
- Georgia Conservation Voters
- Run for Something
- Southern Poverty Law Center Action Fund
- Vote Common Good
- Young Democrats of Cobb County
- Young Democrats of Georgia

Political parties

- Democratic Party of Georgia

== Results ==
2025 Marietta mayoral election
Candidate	Votes	%
Steve Tumlin (incumbent)	6,762	50.3%
Sam Foster	6,675	49.7%
Total votes	13,437	100.0%
