= Georgia's 38th House of Representatives district =

State district in Georgia, USA

Georgia's 38th State House of Representatives district
Representative
David Wilkerson; D–Powder Springs
- Demographics: 36.2% White; 48.7% Black; 9.9% Hispanic; 2.3% Asian
- Population: 57,796

District 38 elects one member of the Georgia House of Representatives. It contains parts of Cobb County including Powder Springs and Mableton.

== Members ==
- Roger Hines (since 2003)
- Jan Jones (2003–2005)
- Steve Tumlin (2005–2009)
- Pat Dooley (2009–2011)
- Sam Teasley (2011–2013)
- David Wilkerson (since 2013)
