= Sam Teasley =

American politician

Member of the Georgia House of Representatives from the 37th district
- In office January 14, 2013 – January 14, 2019
- Preceded by: Terry Johnson
- Succeeded by: Mary Frances Williams

Member of the Georgia House of Representatives from the 38th district
- In office January 10, 2011 – January 14, 2013
- Preceded by: Pat Dooley
- Succeeded by: David Wilkerson

Personal details
- Born: Samuel Kyser Teasley; April 29, 1976 (age 50)
- Party: Republican

Samuel Kyser Teasley (born April 29, 1976) is an American politician. He previously served as a member of the Georgia House of Representatives from January 10, 2011, until January 14, 2019. Teasley sponsored 191 bills. He is a member of the Republican Party. On November 8, 2018, Teasley was defeated by Democrat Mary Frances Williams in a closely contested election.
