= Georgia's 37th House of Representatives district =

State district in Georgia, USA

Georgia's 37th State House of Representatives district
Representative
| Mary Frances Williams; D–Marietta |
- Demographics: 54.0% White; 22.3% Black; 15.2% Hispanic; 6.0% Asian
- Population: 58,008

District 37 elects one member of the Georgia House of Representatives. It contains parts of Cobb County including Marietta and Fair Oaks.

== Members ==
- Sam Teasley (2013–2019)
- Mary Frances Williams (since 2019)
