= Jonathan Wallace (Georgia politician) =

American politician from Georgia

Member of the Georgia House of Representatives from the 119th district
- In office November 27, 2017 – January 14, 2019
- Preceded by: Chuck Williams (R)
- Succeeded by: Marcus Wiedower

Personal details
- Party: Democratic

Jonathan Wallace is an American politician from Georgia. Wallace is a Software Developer and Entrepreneur who graduated from University of Georgia with a Computer Technology degree. Wallace is a former Democratic Party member of Georgia House of Representatives from District 119 from Nov. 27, 2017, until Jan. 14, 2019. He won a November 2017 Special Election to win the seat vacated by Republican Chuck Williams, who was appointed by Governor Nathan Deal to serve as Director of the Georgia Forestry Commission.

On Nov. 6, 2018, Wallace was defeated for re-election by Republican Marcus Wiedower.

On January 13, 2020, Wallace announced he would be challenging Wiedower in the 2020 election to return to the State House. He lost the general election on November 3, 2020 to Marcus Wiedower (Republican Party)

== Electoral history ==
2017 Special Election Georgia House of Representatives District 119
| Party | Candidate | Votes | % |
|---|---|---|---|
| Democratic | Jonathan Wallace | 4,486 | 56.71 |
| Republican | Tom Lord | 1,573 | 19.88 |
| Republican | Marcus Wiedower | 1,368 | 17.29 |
| Republican | Brian Strickland | 484 | 6.12 |
| Total votes | | 7,911 | 100.00 |
| Democratic gain from Republican | | | |

2018 General Election Georgia House of Representatives District 119
| Party | Candidate | Votes | % |
|---|---|---|---|
| Republican | Marcus Wiedower | 13,336 | 52.78 |
| Democratic | Jonathan Wallace (incumbent) | 11,929 | 47.22 |
| Total votes | | 25,265 | 100.00 |
| Republican gain from Democratic | | | |

Political offices
| Preceded by Chuck Williams | Representative of the Georgia House of Representatives 119th District; 2017–2019 | Succeeded by Marcus Wiedower |
