= Pat Dooley =

American politician (born 1946)

Member of the Georgia House of Representatives from the 38th district
- In office January 12, 2009 – January 10, 2011
- Preceded by: Steve Tumlin
- Succeeded by: Sam Teasley

Member of the Georgia House of Representatives from the 33rd district
- In office January 13, 2003 – January 10, 2005

Personal details
- Born: November 12, 1946 (age 79)
- Party: Democratic
- Spouse: John Dooley

Patricia "Pat" Dooley (born November 12, 1946) is a member of the House of Representatives in the U.S. state of Georgia. Dooley is a Democrat and has represented District 38, which encompasses parts of Cobb County, since she defeated Thunder Tumlin on November 4, 2008, by a three percentage point margin.

Dooley is a member of three committees: Agriculture and Consumer Affairs, Budget and Fiscal Affairs Oversight, and Industrial Relations.
