= Eric Gisler =

American politician (born 1976)

Member of the Georgia House of Representatives from the 121st district
- In office January 8, 2026 – January 11, 2027
- Preceded by: Marcus Wiedower
- Succeeded by: Mack Guest IV

Personal details
- Born: March 12, 1976 (age 50)
- Party: Democratic
- Children: 2
- Education: Jonesboro High School; Georgia Southern University; University of Georgia (BS)
- Website: Official website

Eric Martin Gisler (born March 12, 1976) is an American politician, business owner, and technology executive who is a member of the Georgia House of Representatives, representing the 121st district. A Democrat, he flipped the seat in a 2025 special election.

== Early life, education, and career ==
Gisler was born on March 12, 1976 in Atlanta, Georgia and grew up in Jonesboro, Georgia. Gisler graduated from Jonesboro High School in 1994. He completed two years of coursework at the Georgia Southern University before transferring to University of Georgia, where he graduated in 1999 with a dual Bachelor of Science in Biology and Interdisciplinary Studies, the latter of which is equivalent to Oceanography.

After being laid off from the financial technology industry during the COVID-19 pandemic, Gisler purchased The Olive Basket, a gourmet olive oil and balsamic vinegar store, from its previous owners in June 2020, and co-owns the business with his daughter Ella. Gisler also serves as the Head of Product Development at Assurified, a rental housing-focused insurance technology startup.

== Political career ==
=== Prior to electoral politics ===
Gisler served as a co-chair and later the chair of the Oconee County Democratic Party from 2018 to 2022. He also served as the Oconee County Democratic Party treasurer from 2022 through January 22, 2026.

=== 2024 election ===
In 2024, Gisler was the Democratic Party's nominee for Georgia's 121st House of Representatives district. Courtney Frisch had originally won the Democratic nomination unopposed on May 21, but withdrew from the race after the primary. The Democratic Party appointed Gisler as its nominee on June 2. Gisler lost the election to incumbent Republican Marcus Wiedower.

=== 2025 special election ===
On October 28, 2025, Wiedower resigned from representing the 121st district. Gisler, having already filed to run for the district again in 2026, ran in the special election to succeed Wiedower. His campaign was centered on a message of affordability, expanding healthcare access, and reinvesting the state's surplus funds. Gisler narrowly defeated his Republican opponent Mack Guest IV on December 9 by 198 votes, thereby flipping the seat, which was considered an upset. The district had voted for Trump by 12 points in the 2024 election.

=== Georgia house term ===
Gisler was sworn into the Georgia House of Representatives on January 8, 2026. In January 2026, after Attorney General Pam Bondi and the Department of Justice demanded that states turn over private information on registered voters, Gisler introduced House Resolution 1200 with 5 Democratic co-sponsors, which would reaffirm the current Georgia law that prohibited the sharing of personal voter data. In March 2026, Gisler sponsored HB 1501, a bill which would require the state to maintain a public website displaying monitored levels of forever chemicals and require public utilities to notify customers if thresholds are met. Gisler also worked with a Republican legislator to introduce a bill which would "automatically cover newborns on the parents's insurance". He also co-sponsored a bill that would have legalized plug-in solar in the state of Georgia.

In a bid for transparency and accessibility, Gisler organized monthly public town halls. He also organized additional town halls on key issues such as AI data centers and Flock camera abuses by law enforcement. At his January town hall, Gisler expressed opposition to eliminating state income tax, stating that the budget surplus would best be reinvested into a trust fund for child care, but was open to reforming property tax to ease burdens on homeowners with fixed incomes. At his March town hall, he explained his vote in support of cutting state income tax for taxpayer relief but opposed complete elimination, and expressed an opposition to term limits arguing that the issue of gerrymandering was of greater priority and that fair elections would serve to be a term limit on legislators.

=== 2026 election ===
In 2026, Gisler faced Guest again. Gisler's campaign centered on government transparency, stricter regulations on AI data centers and Flock cameras, education funding, and a "housing first" approach to homelessness. Had Gisler been reelected, he would have intended to introduce legislation to eliminate gerrymandering by implementing an independent, non-partisan redistricting commission. Guest defeated Gisler in the rematch, by a vote of 52.47% to 47.53%. During the 2026 midterm "blue wave", this state legislative race was the sole instance of a Republican gain in Georgia.

== Personal life ==
Gisler lives in Watkinsville. He has lived in the 121st district since 2003, having been a resident of Oconee County, Georgia for 14 years as of 2026, and previously living in Clarke County, Georgia for nine years. He has two children, a son and a daughter, both of whom are college-aged.

He owns a rental house in Clarke County, Georgia.

== Electoral history ==
Georgia House of Representatives 121st district general election, 2024
Party	Candidate	Votes	%
Republican	Marcus Wiedower (incumbent)	19,764	61.1%
Democratic	Eric Martin Gisler	12,567	38.9%
Total votes		32,331	100%
Republican hold			

2025 Georgia House of Representatives 121st district special election
Party	Candidate	Votes	%
Democratic	Eric Gisler	5,874	50.86
Republican	Mack "Dutch" Guest IV	5,676	49.14
Total votes		11,550	100
Democratic gain from Republican			

2026 Georgia House of Representatives 121st district general election
Party	Candidate	Votes	%
Republican	Mack "Dutch" Guest IV	14,125	52.47
Democratic	Eric Gisler	12,793	47.53
Total votes		26,918	100
Republican gain from Democratic			
