= Charles Pinckney Sumner =

American lawyer and public official (1776–1839)

Sheriff of Suffolk County, Massachusetts
- In office 1825–1839
- Preceded by: Joseph Hall
- Succeeded by: Joseph Eveleth

Clerk of the Massachusetts House of Representatives
- In office 1810–1811
- Preceded by: Nicholas Tillinghast
- Succeeded by: Nicholas Tillinghast
- In office 1807–1808
- Preceded by: Nicholas Tillinghast
- Succeeded by: Nicholas Tillinghast

Personal details
- Born: January 20, 1776 Milton, Massachusetts, US
- Died: April 24, 1839 (aged 63) Boston, Massachusetts, US
- Resting place: Mount Auburn Cemetery, Cambridge, Massachusetts
- Party: Democratic-Republican
- Spouse: Relief Jacob
- Children: 9 (including Charles Sumner)
- Relatives: Edwin Vose Sumner (second cousin)
- Education: Harvard College
- Occupation: Attorney; Public official

Charles Pinckney Sumner (January 20, 1776—April 24, 1839) was an American attorney, abolitionist, and politician who served as Sheriff of Suffolk County, Massachusetts from 1825 to 1838. He was an early proponent of racially integrated schools and shocked 19th-century Boston by opposing anti-miscegenation laws. His son was famed abolitionist and U.S. Senator Charles Sumner.

== Early life and education ==
Sumner was born on January 20, 1776, out of wedlock to Esther Holmes. His father, Major Job Sumner, was a Harvard student who dropped out of classes to serve in the American Revolution. After the Revolution, Job Sumner served as a commissioner for the new Confederation government to settle claims with Georgia.

Sumner attended Phillips Academy and then Harvard College, where he became a personal friend to Joseph Story. At his graduation in 1796, he delivered a valedictory poem in the chapel. Under Story's influence, he became an ardent Jeffersonian in politics, even though Massachusetts was a strongly Federalist state.

== Career ==
He then studied law under Josiah Quincy. While there Sumner practiced law and served as Clerk of the Massachusetts House of Representatives from 1807 to 1808 and again 1810 to 1811, but his legal practice was only moderately successful, and his family teetered on the edge of the middle class.

In 1819, he gave up his legal practice to serve as deputy sheriff of Suffolk County. In 1825, Governor Levi Lincoln appointed Sumner as Sheriff of Suffolk County, Massachusetts, a position he held until 1839. The position markedly increased his income, enabling him to afford higher education for his children.

=== Opposition to slavery ===
Sumner hated slavery and taught his son that freeing the slaves would "do us no good" unless they were treated equally by society. Sumner was a close associate of William Ellery Channing, an influential Unitarian minister in Boston. Channing believed that human beings had an infinite potential to improve themselves. Expanding on this argument, Sumner concluded that environment had "an important, if not controlling influence" in shaping individuals. By creating a society where "knowledge, virtue and religion" took precedence, "the most forlorn shall grow into forms of unimagined strength and beauty." Moral law, he believed, was as important for governments as it was for individuals, and legal institutions that inhibited one's ability to grow—like slavery or segregation—were evil. While Sumner often viewed contemporary society critically, his faith in reform was unshakable. When accused of utopianism, he replied: "The Utopias of one age have been the realities of the next."

== Personal life ==
Sumner married Relief Jacob, a 25-year-old seamstress and the granddaughter of a wealthy landowner and politician from Hanover and descendant of provincial Puritan Governor William Bradford. They were described as exceedingly formal and undemonstrative.

They had at least nine children: twins Charles (1811-1874) and Matilda (1811-1832), Albert (1812-1856), Henry (1814-1852), George (1817-1863), Jane (1820-1837), Mary (1822-1844), Horace (1824-1850), and Julia (1827-1876). Charles attended Boston Latin School and Harvard College; after his father's death, he was elected United States Senator in 1851 and became a leader in the crusade against slavery.

The family first lived on Botolph (now Irving) Street in Boston's wealthy Beacon Hill neighborhood, where Charles and Matilda were born. Later, they moved to Hancock Street, where they lived in a modest home. The family attended Trinity Church. After his 1826 promotion to sheriff, they moved to a much larger thirteen-room, three story home at 20 Hancock Street and occupied a pew in King's Chapel.

His "Eulogy on the illustrious George Washington. Pronounced at Milton, twenty-second February, 1800" was published by Horace Mann. He delivered various speeches, poems, and letters.

He was a second cousin of Edwin Vose Sumner.
