= 2025 South Fulton mayoral election =

Mayoral election in Georgia

- November 4, 2025 (general); December 2, 2025 (runoff)
Candidate	Carmalitha Gumbs	Mark Baker	Bill Edwards
Party	Nonpartisan	Nonpartisan	Nonpartisan
First round	10,533; 39.3%	5,179; 19.3%	4,446; 16.6%
Runoff	8,007; 59.8%	5,394; 40.3%	Eliminated
Candidate	Joseph Adeyemi	Ray Mills
Party	Nonpartisan	Nonpartisan
First round	1,780; 6.6%	1,342; 5.0%
Runoff	Eliminated	Eliminated
Mayor before election
Khalid Kamau
Elected mayor
Carmalitha Gumbs

The 2025 South Fulton mayoral election is held on November 4, 2025, to elect the mayor of South Fulton, Georgia. Incumbent mayor Khalid Kamau ran for re-election to a second consecutive term, but placed sixth in the general election. Democrat Carmalitha Gumbs was elected in the runoff on December 2, 2025.

== Background ==
Kamau was first elected in 2021 with 59% of the vote in a runoff election on November 30, describing himself as "America's first #BlackLivesMatter organizer elected to public office." He was arrested in 2023 for trespassing, and appeared in court on September 23, 2025. An audit in July 2025 revealed that Kamau had spent nearly $70,000 in "questionable expenses," including Apple Music subscriptions, car washes, food purchases, and an international trip to Ghana, among others. Kamau offered to pay the money back and called the audit politically motivated, even though it was an independent audit by Baker Tilly. He originally announced in April that he would not run for re-election. Despite this, he launched his re-election bid in August.

== Candidates ==
=== Declared ===
- Joseph Adeyemi, project manager and economist
- Mark Baker, former mayor pro tempore
- Kelvin Davis, Navy veteran
- Bill Edwards, former mayor (2017–2021)
- Carmalitha Gumbs, city councilor from the 2nd district (2017–present)
- Jewel Johnson, retired health care professional
- Khalid Kamau, incumbent mayor
- Ray Mills, entrepreneur
- Ryan Olson, fitness professional

== Debates and forums ==
2025 South Fulton mayoral election debates and forums
No.	Date	Host	Moderator	Link	Participants			
P Participant A Absent I Invited N Not invited NYD Not yet declared W Withdrawn
P Participant A Absent I Invited N Not invited NYD Not yet declared W Withdrawn					Adeyemi	Edwards	Gumbs	Kamau
1	September 18, 2025	Georgia Men for Democracy Now	Unknown	N/A	P	P	P	N

== Results ==
2025 South Fulton mayoral election
Candidate	Votes	%
Carmalitha Gumbs	10,539	39.30
Mark Baker	5,179	19.31
Bill Edwards	4,446	16.58
Joseph Adeyemi	1,780	6.64
Ray Mills	1,342	5.00
Khalid Kamau (incumbent)	1,270	4.74
Jewel Johnson	1,146	4.27
Kelvin Davis	771	2.87
Ryan Olson	346	1.29
Total votes	26,819	100.00

== Runoff ==
=== Results ===
2025 South Fulton mayoral election runoff
Candidate	Votes	%
Carmalitha Gumbs	8,007	59.75
Mark Baker	5,394	40.25
Total votes	13,401	100.00
