= 2024 in Georgia (U.S. state) =

- Decades: 2000s; 2010s; 2020s
- See also: History of Georgia (U.S. state); Historical outline of Georgia (U.S. state); List of years in Georgia (U.S. state); 2024 in the United States

The following is a list of events of the year 2024 in Georgia.

== Incumbents ==
=== State government ===
- Governor: Brian Kemp (R)

== Events ==
- January 23 – The Michael C. Carlos Museum in Atlanta repatriates three antiquities, including a statuette of Terpsichore, to Greece after their doubtful provenance was proven false.
- February 22 – Laken Riley: Laken Riley, a 22-year-old nursing student at Augusta University, was murdered by Jose Antonio Ibarra, a 26-year-old Venezuelan migrant.
- March 12:
  - The Democratic Party holds presidential nominating contests in the Georgia.
  - The Republican Party holds presidential nominating contests in the Georgia.
- June 11:
  - In Atlanta, a man shoots three people in the Peachtree Center mall following a dispute. An off-duty police officer shoots and arrests the gunman.
  - Several hours after the Peachtree Center shooting, a man who witnessed the shooting boards a Ride Gwinnett bus and gets into an argument with another passenger. The man takes the other passenger's gun and shoots him with it before holding the bus hostage. After forcing the bus to drive onto Interstate 85, police force the bus to stop and arrest the hostage-taker.
- June 17 – Six people, including three children, are killed in a house fire in Newnan; five others are hospitalized.
- June 27 – A Presidential Debate hosted by CNN between incumbent President Joe Biden and former President Donald Trump takes place in Atlanta.
- August 14 – The United States Drug Enforcement Administration announces the seizure of more than 2,300 lb (1,000 kg) of methamphetamine hidden in celery at a farmers market in Forest Park. A citizen of Mexican was arrested in connection to the seizure.
- August 27 – Two workers are killed and another is injured in an aircraft tire explosion at a Delta Air Lines maintenance facility near the Hartsfield–Jackson Atlanta International Airport in Atlanta.
- September 4 – 2024 Apalachee High School shooting: In a mass school shooting at Apalachee High School in Winder, four people are killed and nine are wounded.
- September 27 – At least 25 people are killed and over 900,000 are reported to be without power due to high winds and flooding caused by Hurricane Helene in Georgia. A rare flash flood emergency is issued for the Atlanta metropolitan area.
- September 29 – Approximately 17,000 people are ordered to evacuate from their homes, and more are ordered to shelter in place after a fire at a BioLab facility in Conyers potentially causes hazardous chlorine contamination.
- October 1 – The 39th President of the United States, Jimmy Carter, turns 100 years old, becoming the first former President in US history to reach that age.
- October 19 – At least seven people are killed and several others are reported missing after a dock collapses on Sapelo Island.
- November 20 – José Antonio Ibarra is sentenced to life in prison without parole for the murder of Laken Riley, the 22-year-old nursing student.
- December 29 – Former U.S. President Jimmy Carter dies at the age of 100 in Plains.

== See also ==
- 2024 in the United States
