= 2025 Sandy Springs mayoral election =

Mayoral election in Georgia

- November 4, 2025 (first round); December 2, 2025 (runoff)
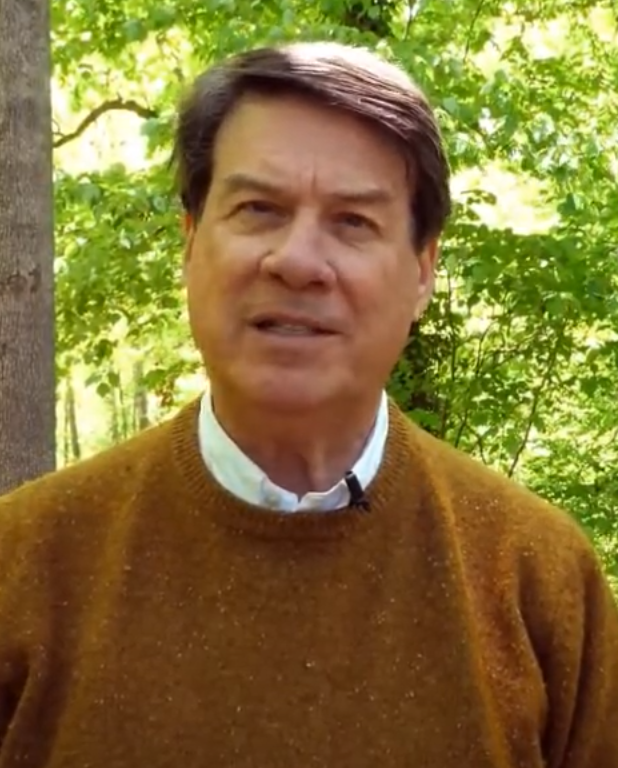

Candidate	Rusty Paul	Dontaye Carter
Party	Nonpartisan	Nonpartisan
Popular vote	10,298	4,568
Percentage	69.3%	30.7%
Mayor before election
Rusty Paul
Elected mayor
Rusty Paul

The 2025 Sandy Springs mayoral election was held on November 4, 2025, to elect the mayor of Sandy Springs, Georgia. Incumbent mayor Rusty Paul was re-elected to a fourth consecutive term.

== Background ==
Paul was first elected in 2013, and subsequently re-elected in 2017 and 2021. Candidates in the 2025 election raised over $300 thousand by May.

== Candidates ==
=== Advanced to runoff ===
- Dontaye Carter, runner-up for mayor in 2021
- Rusty Paul, incumbent mayor

=== Eliminated in general ===
- Andy Bauman, city councilor (2013–present)
- Jody Reichel, city councilor (2017–present)

=== Withdrawn ===
- Alex Somer (endorsed Carter)

== General election ==
=== Endorsements ===
Dontaye Carter

Labor unions

- Atlanta North Georgia Labor Council

Organizations

- Southern Poverty Law Center Action Fund
- Run for Something

Political parties

- Georgia Working Families Party

=== Debates and forums ===
2025 Sandy Springs mayoral election debates and forums
No.	Date	Host	Moderator	Link	Participants			
P Participant A Absent I Invited NYD Not yet declared W Withdrawn
P Participant A Absent I Invited NYD Not yet declared W Withdrawn					Bauman	Carter	Paul	Reichel
1	September 14, 2025	Elevate Church	Gary Alexander	N/A	P	P	P	P
2	October 8, 2025	Rough Draft Atlanta; WSB-TV	Jorge Esteves	WSB-TV	P	P	P	P

=== Results ===
2025 Sandy Springs mayoral election
Candidate	Votes	%
Rusty Paul (incumbent)	9,620	43.21
Dontaye Carter	4,703	21.12
Andy Bauman	4,327	19.44
Jody Reichel	3,613	16.23
Total votes	22,263	100.00

== Runoff ==
=== Endorsements ===
Rusty Paul

State legislators

- Esther Panitch, state representative from the 54th district (2023–present) (Democratic)

=== Results ===
2025 Sandy Springs mayoral election
Candidate	Votes	%
Rusty Paul (incumbent)	10,298	69.27
Dontaye Carter	4,568	30.73
Total votes	14,866	100.00
