= Mandi Ballinger =

American politician (1975–2025)

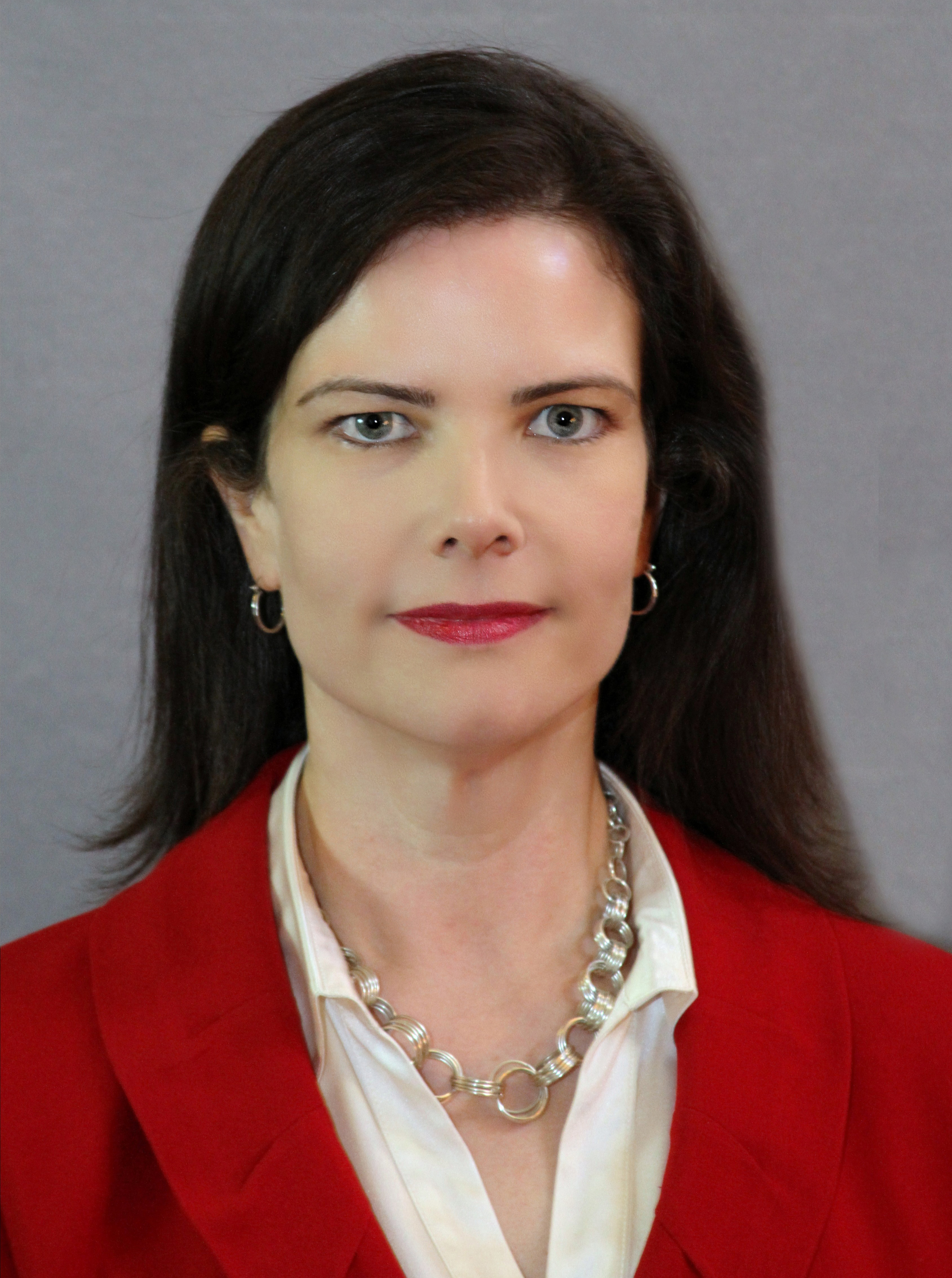

Member of the Georgia House of Representatives from the 23rd district
- In office January 14, 2013 – October 12, 2025
- Preceded by: Mark Hamilton
- Succeeded by: Bill Fincher

Personal details
- Born: April 14, 1975
- Died: October 12, 2025 (aged 50)
- Party: Republican

Mandi Lia Ballinger (April 14, 1975 – October 12, 2025) was an American politician from Georgia who was a Republican member of Georgia House of Representatives for District 23.

== Early life ==
Ballinger grew up in Cherokee County, Georgia.

== Career ==
Ballinger started her career working at a domestic violence shelter, later working as a victim advocate at a district attorney's office. She later helped to found a child advocacy center.

In 2012, Ballinger was elected to the Georgia House of Representatives to represent District 23. During her period in office, she served as chair of the House Judiciary Juvenile Committee. She also served as vice chair of the House Rules Committee, filling in as interim chair following the death of Richard H. Smith in January 2024.

== Personal life ==
Ballinger was married to Allen Morris, a State Court Judge in Georgia, and had a son with him. She died from cancer on October 12, 2025.

== Political views ==
=== Domestic issues ===
Ballinger was a supporter of the Second Amendment. In 2017, she supported legislation that allowed students to carry concealed firearms on college campuses. In 2022, she carried a bill that would allow people to carry concealed handguns without a license.
