= Georgia's 23rd House of Representatives district =

State district in Georgia, USA

Georgia's 23rd State House of Representatives district
Representative
Bill Fincher; R–Canton
- Demographics: 75.4% White; 8.1% Black; 12.5% Hispanic; 1.9% Asian
- Population: 58,300

District 23 elects one member of the Georgia House of Representatives. It contains parts of Cherokee County. It is currently represented by Republican Bill Fincher. The seat was vacated on October 12, 2025. Republican Bill Fincher was elected to the seat on January 6, 2026.

== Members ==
- Jack Murphy (until 2007)
- Mark Hamilton (2007–2013)
- Mandi Ballinger (2013–2025)
- Bill Fincher (since 2026)
