= 2022 in Georgia (U.S. state) =

- Decades: 2000s; 2010s; 2020s
- See also: History of Georgia (U.S. state); Historical outline of Georgia (U.S. state); List of years in Georgia (U.S. state); 2022 in the United States

The following is a list of events of the year 2022 in Georgia.

== Incumbents ==
=== State government ===
- Governor: Brian Kemp (R)

== Events ==
- April 5 - 2022 Pembroke–Black Creek tornado
- November 3 – 2022 Georgia gubernatorial election

== See also ==
- 2022 in the United States
