= Anderson Dilworth =

American politician and businessman (1929–2026)

William Anderson Dilworth (August 10, 1929 – June 9, 2026) was an American politician and businessman.

== Life and career ==
Dilworth was born on August 10, 1929. His father C. D. Dilworth established a grocery business, which William took over and founded Dill's Food City.

He was a member of the Georgia House of Representatives between 1959 and 1960. Around 1972, he was president of the Retail Food Dealers Association.

Dilworth died at his home in Royston, Georgia, on June 9, 2026, at the age of 96.
