= Georgia's 121st House of Representatives district =

State district in Georgia, USA

Georgia's 121st State House of Representatives district
Representative
| Eric Gisler; D–Watkinsville |
- Demographics: 62.4% White; 27.6% Black; 5.5% Hispanic; 1.0% Asian
- Population: 59,338

District 121 elects one member of the Georgia House of Representatives. It contains parts of Clarke County and Oconee County.

== Members ==
- Barry Fleming (2013–2023)
- Marcus Wiedower (2023–2025)
- Eric Gisler (since 2025)
