= Bill Fincher (politician) =

American politician from Georgia

Member of the Georgia House of Representatives from the 23rd district
- Incumbent
- Assumed office January 10, 2026
- Preceded by: Mandi Ballinger

Personal details
- Party: Republican
- Website: billfincherforcherokee.com

William Wesley Fincher III is an American politician who was elected as a member of the Georgia House of Representatives from the 23rd district in 2026. He was elected in a special election run-off. He is former assistant district attorney.
