= Steve Tumlin =

American politician (born 1947)

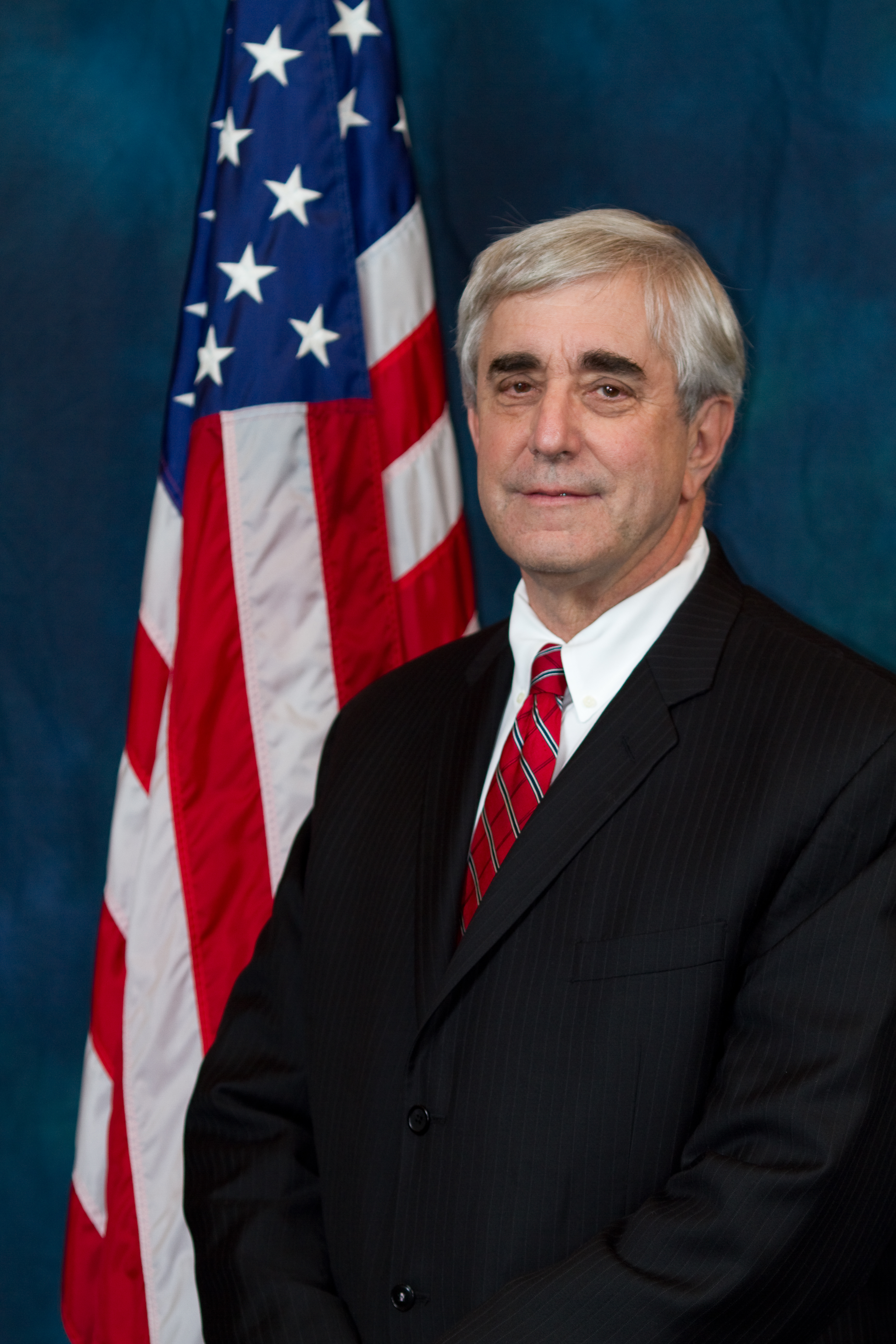
- Tumlin in 2010

Mayor of Marietta, Georgia
- Incumbent
- Assumed office January 4, 2010
- Preceded by: Bill Dunaway

Member of the Georgia House of Representatives from the 38th district
- In office January 10, 2005 – January 12, 2009
- Preceded by: Jan Jones
- Succeeded by: Pat Dooley

Personal details
- Born: Raymond Stevens Tumlin Jr. April 17, 1947 (age 79) Marietta, Georgia, U.S.
- Party: Republican
- Spouse: Jean Alice
- Education: University of Georgia (BBA); University of Denver (MBA); Georgia State University (JD)

Raymond Stevens "Thunder" Tumlin Jr. (born April 17, 1947) is an American politician and former member of the Georgia House of Representatives representing District 38, which encompasses parts of Cobb County. He became mayor of Marietta, Georgia in 2010 and was reelected in 2013. Tumlin has served as Chairman of the Board of the Marietta Board of Education. He serves as Chairman of the Marietta Board of Lights and Water and was elected to the Board Of Directors of the Municipal Electric Association of Georgia (MEAG) in 2013. Tumlin is a member of the Republican Party.

Tumlin is a Certified Public Accountant and an attorney, earning his undergraduate degree from the University of Georgia, an MBA from the University of Denver, and his JD from Georgia State University's College of Law. Tumlin practices law as a tax attorney in Marietta.

In April 2022, he vetoed a resolution to make Juneteenth a paid holiday for city employees.

In July 2023, he was succeeded as a member of the Cobb & Douglas County Board of Health by Mayor of Mableton Michael Owens.
