= 2025 Atlanta mayoral election =

Local election in Georgia, US

- November 4, 2025
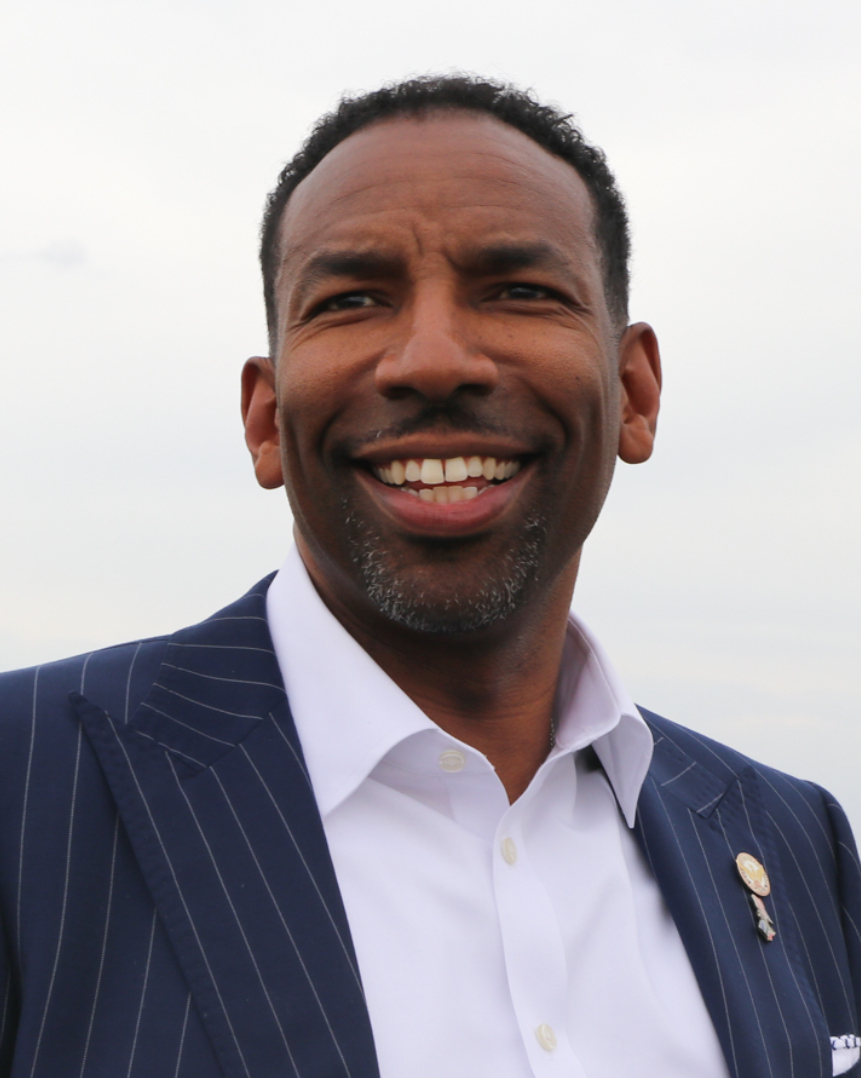

| Candidate | Andre Dickens | Eddie Meredith | Kalema Jackson |
| Popular vote | 88,539 | 6,331 | 5,290 |
| Percentage | 85.03% | 6.08% | 5.08% |
- Precinct results Dickens: 50–60% 60–70% 70–80% 80–90% >90% No data
Mayor before election
Andre Dickens
Democratic
Elected mayor
Andre Dickens
Democratic

The 2025 Atlanta mayoral election was held on November 4, 2025 to elect the mayor of Atlanta. Incumbent mayor Andre Dickens was elected to a second term.

== Background ==
Andre Dickens won his first election by 63.4%, in the runoff election against Felicia Moore. Dickens announced his re-election campaign in February 2024.

== Candidates ==
=== Declared ===
- Andre Dickens, incumbent mayor
- Helmut Domagalski, LGBTQ+ nonprofit founder
- Kalema Jackson, former police officer
- Eddie Meredith, community organizer

=== Did not qualify ===
- Marcus LaMar, Blandtown resident
- Walter Reeves, legal scholar
- Larmetria Trammell
- Ocean Zotique

== Endorsements ==
Andre Dickens

Labor unions

- Atlanta Professional Firefighters (IAFF Local 134)

== Results ==
Election results
| Candidate | Votes | % |
|---|---|---|
| Andre Dickens (incumbent) | 88,539 | 85.03 |
| Eddie Meredith | 6,331 | 6.08 |
| Kalema Jackson | 5,290 | 5.08 |
| Helmut Domagalski | 3,964 | 3.81 |
| Total votes | 104,124 | 100.00 |
