= Killing of Leonard Cure =

2023 police killing in Georgia, US

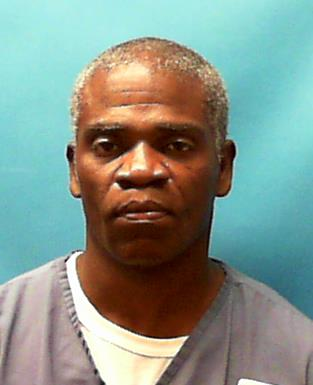
- FDOC mug shot of Leonard Cure c. 2020
- Date: October 16, 2023
- Location: Camden County, Georgia, U.S.
- Type: Police shooting
- Participants: Leonard Cure and Sheriff's Deputy Buck Aldridge
- Deaths: Leonard Cure, 53
- Inquiries: Georgia Bureau of Investigation

On October 16, 2023, Leonard Cure, a 53-year-old man, was fatally shot after he assaulted Sheriff's Deputy Buck Aldridge in Camden County, Georgia during a traffic stop for speeding. Cure had been exonerated in 2020 after being wrongfully convicted of armed robbery in Florida in 2003. On February 25, 2025, the district attorney announced that Aldridge would not face criminal charges in Cure's death.

== Background ==
Leonard Cure (November 23, 1969 – October 16, 2023) was wrongfully convicted of armed robbery in 2003. On November 10, 2003, an armed robbery took place in Dania Beach, Florida in which a man with a revolver forced his way into a Walgreens store. The suspect fled the store with nearly $2,000 in cash. Descriptions of the suspect provided by two store employees did not match. In 2004, Cure's trial was declared a mistrial after the jury deadlocked. Cure was tried again, convicted and sentenced to life in prison.

The Florida Innocence Project conducted an investigation and found that an ATM receipt proved that Cure had been miles away from the store during the time of the robbery. In April 2020, Cure was exonerated and released from prison. Cure received $817,000 in compensation for his imprisonment. He was the first person to be exonerated by the Broward County Conviction Review Unit.

== Shooting ==
On October 16, 2023 at around 7:30 a.m., Cure was observed speeding in a pickup truck on Interstate 95 in Camden County, Georgia by Sheriff's Deputy Buck Aldridge, who pursued Cure and pulled him to the side of the road. Aldridge instructed Cure to exit his vehicle and move to the back of it. Cure exited the truck and placed his hands on the back of the it, but he refused to move his hands behind his back so that Aldridge could arrest him. Aldridge warned Cure that he would be tased if he did not comply. Cure refused and questioned why he was being arrested instead of receiving a speeding ticket. When Cure raised one of his arms upward, Aldridge attempted to tase him.

While being tased, Cure turned and faced Aldridge and began walking toward him while swinging at him and grabbing the taser wire. The men engaged in a physical struggle for about 20 seconds, during which Cure grabbed Aldridge's face and throat while shouting, "Yeah, bitch!". Aldridge struck Cure multiple times with his baton. As the struggle continued, Aldridge drew his gun and fired a fatal shot at Cure in self-defense, causing him to fall to the ground. Paramedics arrived to render aid to Cure, but he later died.

== Response ==
On October 18, the Camden County sheriff's office released body-worn and dash-camera videos of the moments preceding Cure's death.

Cure's relatives suspected that he had resisted arrest because of psychological trauma that he suffered after having served 16 years in prison for a crime that he did not commit. Cure's brother, Michael Cure, said, "I believe there were possibly some issues going on, some mental issues with my brother. I know him quite well. The officer just triggered him, undoubtedly triggered him. It was excitement met with excitement."

On February 27, 2024, Cure's family filed a $16 million federal lawsuit against the sheriff's office and the deputy involved in Cure's death, alleging "excessive and deadly force" against Cure.

On February 25, 2025, the district attorney announced that Aldridge would not face any criminal charges in Cure's killing.

On August 7, 2025, the federal attorney for the southern district of Georgia announced the indictment of Aldridge for federal civil-rights violations unrelated to the Cure incident. A federal grand jury returned a 13-count indictment charging Aldridge with applying excessive force in four arrests and subsequently falsifying records.

== See also ==
- Lists of killings by law enforcement officers in the United States
