= Marcus Wiedower =

American businessman, real estate agent and politician from Georgia

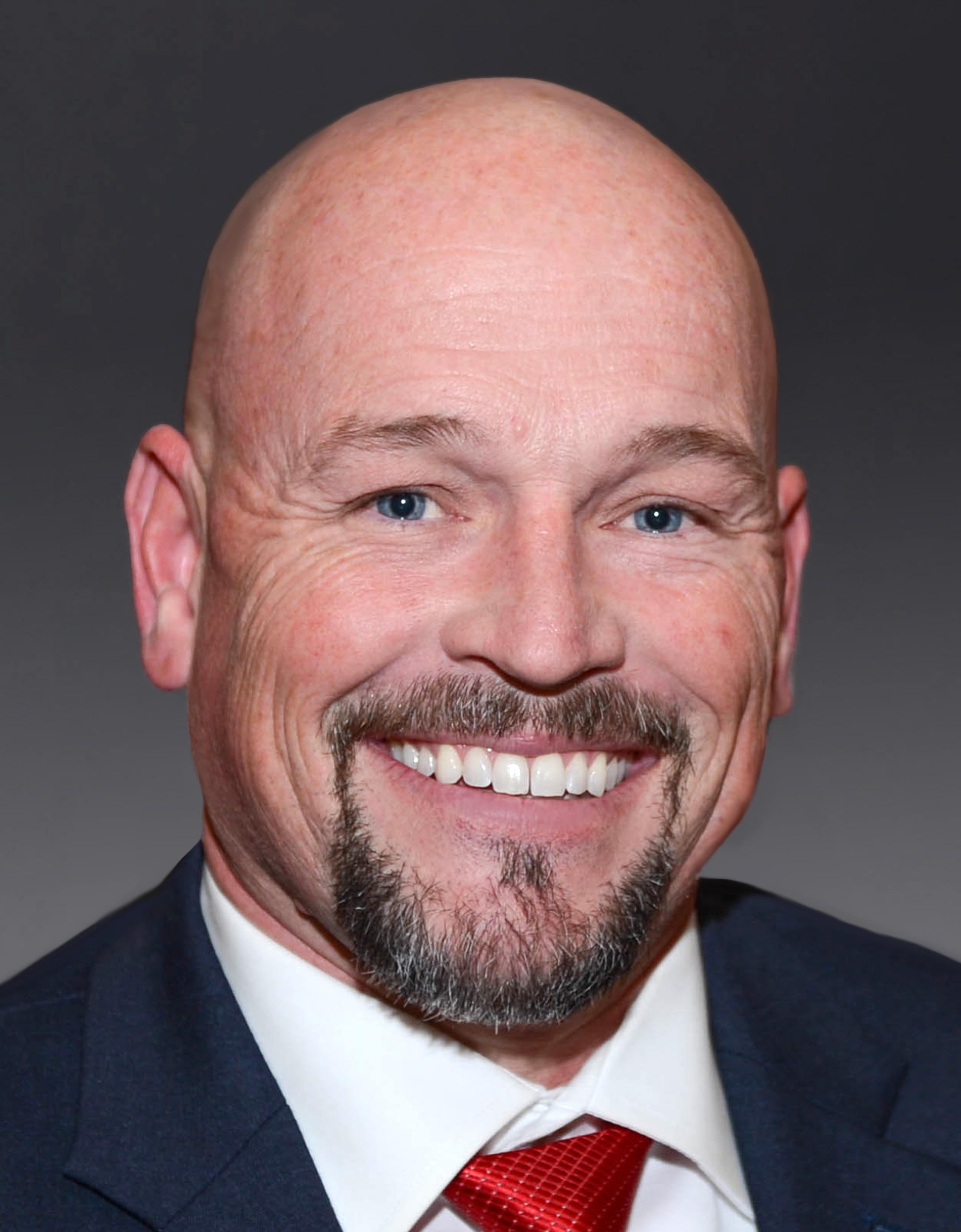
- Official headshot

Member of the Georgia House of Representatives
- In office January 14, 2019 – October 28, 2025
- Preceded by: Jonathan Wallace
- Succeeded by: Eric Gisler
- Constituency: 119th District (2019–2023); 121st District (2023–2025)

Personal details
- Born: Marcus Andrew Wiedower; October 8, 1975 (age 50) Atlanta, Georgia, U.S.
- Party: Republican
- Spouse: Kelly Wiedower
- Children: 3
- Education: University of Georgia
- Occupation: Businessman, real estate agent, politician

Marcus Andrew Wiedower (born October 8, 1975) is an American businessman, real estate agent, and politician from Georgia. Wiedower is a former Republican member of the Georgia House of Representatives for Districts 119 and 121.

== Early life ==
In 1975, Wiedower was born in Atlanta, Georgia.

== Education ==
In 1999, Wiedower earned a bachelor's degree in Landscape Architecture from University of Georgia, where he was a member of Tau Kappa Epsilon fraternity.

== Career ==
Wiedower is a former President of companies in the construction industry. Wiedower is a former owner of Blueprint Builders, a building contractor in Georgia. Wiedower is a real estate agent with Coldwell Banker Upchurch Realty in Georgia.

In 2016, Wiedower campaigned for a seat as County Commissioner of Oconee County, Georgia. Wiedower was defeated by Chuck Horton.

On November 6, 2018, Wiedower won the election and became a Republican member of Georgia House of Representatives for District 119. Wiedower defeated Jonathan Wallace with 52.78% of the votes. On November 3, 2020, as an incumbent, Wiedower won the election and continued serving District 119. Wiedower defeated Jonathan Wallace with 54.85% of the votes.

Wiedower resigned from the Georgia House in October 2025 in order to pursue a business opportunity.

== Personal life ==
Wiedower's wife is Kelly Wiedower. They have three children. Wiedower and his family live in Watkinsville, Georgia.

Georgia House of Representatives
Preceded by Jonathan Wallace	Member of the Georgia House of Representatives from the 119th district 2019–2023	Succeeded by Holt Persinger
Preceded by Barry Fleming	Member of the Georgia House of Representatives from the 121st district 2023–2025	Succeeded by Eric Gisler
