= List of waterfalls in North Georgia =

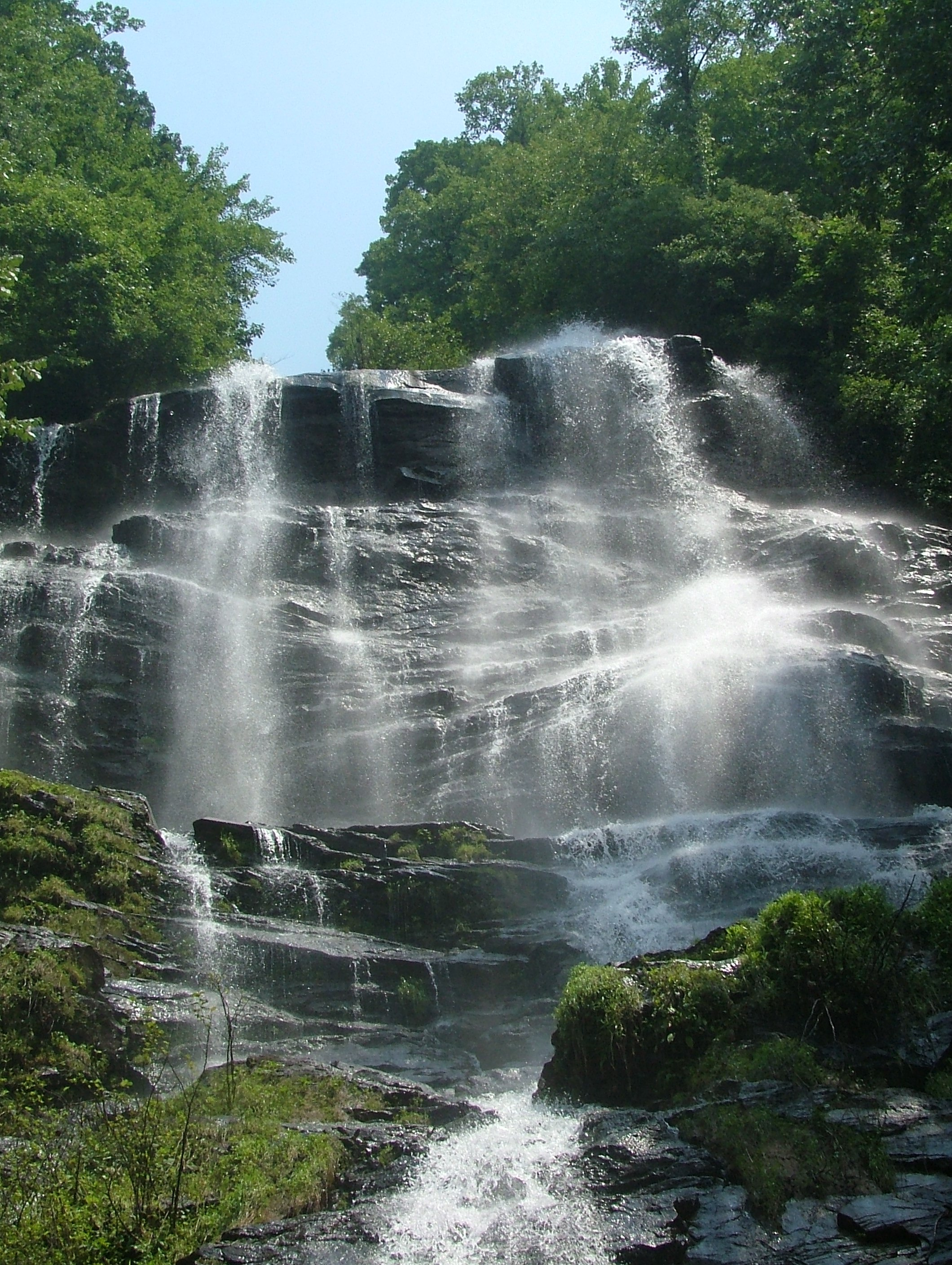
Amicalola Falls in Dawson County, Georgia, USA

The waterfalls of northern Georgia, U.S., are a prominent feature of the geography of that region, as well as a major focus of tourism and outdoor recreation. Many are located in state parks, national forests, wildlife management areas, and other public lands. Many are accessible—with varying degrees of ease or difficulty—via established hiking trails, and some developed areas include boardwalks, observation platforms, picnic areas, and other amenities. The Cherokee called this region "Land of a Thousand Waterfalls". The third-, fourth-, and fifth-highest waterfalls in the eastern United States are located in northern Georgia.

In this discussion, North Georgia refers to the mountainous regions of the extreme northern portion of the state, an area including Banks, Dade, Dawson, Fannin, Gilmer, Habersham, Lumpkin, Murray, Pickens, Rabun, Stephens, Towns, Union, Walker, and White Counties. There are, of course, waterfalls in other sections of the state; however, due to variations in both climate and terrain they are most abundant and most dramatic in the extreme north.

== Falls by county ==
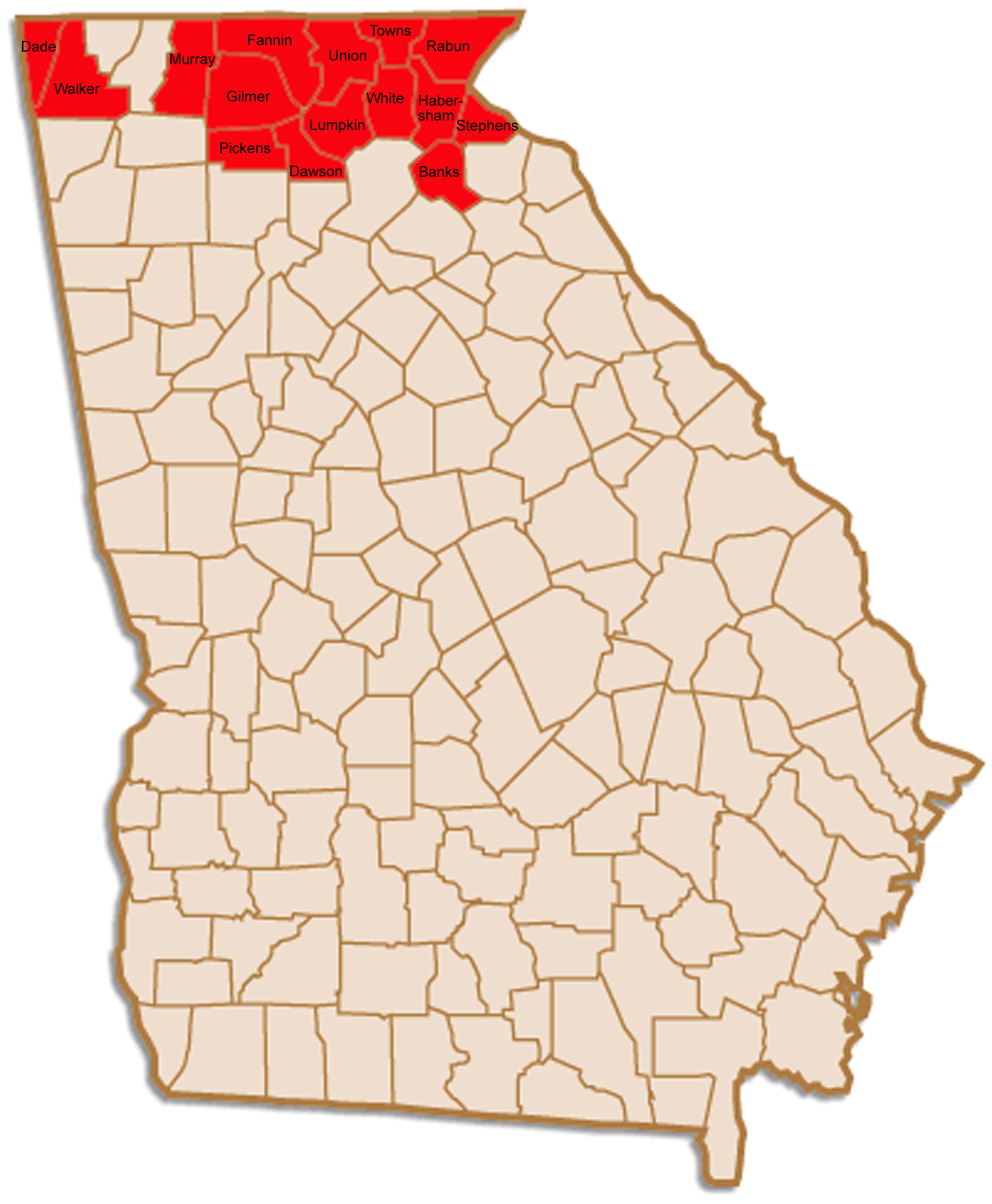
The counties of northern Georgia

Waterfalls that are located on private property and thus inaccessible to the public are described as such or are marked (NA). It is the visitor's responsibility to respect and honor the rights of private landholders.

Those maps, coordinates, and descriptions presented here are meant only to provide approximate or relative locations. Numerous publications and online resources are available to those wishing to visit these sites, both by foot and by vehicle. As many of these sites remain in a relatively wild state caution must be exercised at all times.

=== Dade County ===
- Cherokee Falls & Hemlock Falls—located in Cloudland Canyon State Park near Trenton, in a deep gorge on Sitton Gulch Creek. (Trailhead: 34°50.07′N 85°28.90′W)

=== Dawson County ===
- Amicalola Falls—at 729 feet (222 m) Amicalola Falls is the highest waterfall in Georgia and the third highest east of the Mississippi River. It is approximately four times the height of Niagara's Horseshoe Falls. It is located on Amicalola Creek in Amicalola Falls State Park and is accessible via several trails, bridges, and parking areas. Visitors may park at either the top or the base of the falls; a well-maintained trail, including over 600 steps, connects those two points. Another trail connects the falls to the terminus of the Appalachian Trail on nearby Springer Mountain. Some sources, including the 2004 Georgia State Parks guide book, claim that Amicaolola Falls are "the tallest east of the Mississippi River," although Crabtree Falls in Virginia (at 1000 feet) and Glassmine Falls in North Carolina (800 feet) are both taller. (The state park website is more specific—and perhaps more accurate—citing Amicalola as "the tallest cascading waterfall". More recent editions of the print version of the guide have corrected the error.) Amicalola Falls has been on the List of the seven natural wonders of Georgia since 1926.(34°33.81′N 84°14.66′W)
- Bearden Falls—located in the Chattahoochee National Forest on Bearden Creek. (34°36.48′N 84°11.77′W)
- Cochrans Falls—at 600 feet (180 m), is tied with Caledonia Cascade as the second highest waterfall in Georgia. It is on Cochrans Creek near Dawsonville. (34°34.52′N 84°12.97′W)
- Crawford Falls—located on private property and not accessible to the public.
- "Edge of the World" Rapids—Class IV rapids on the Amicalola River. (Parking area: 34°25.60′N 84°12.80′W)
- Falls Creek Falls—located in the Dawson Forest, an area containing at least forty three waterfalls. (Upper Falls:34°30.78′N 84°19.42′W; Falls Creek Falls:34°30.94′N 84°19.11′W; Lower Falls:34°30.79′N 84°18.43′W)
- Lower Falls & Upper Falls—located on Disharoon Creek in the southwest corner of Dawson County, near the gated community of Big Canoe. (34°28.36′N 84°19.12′W)

=== Fannin County ===
- Jacks River Falls—on Jacks River in the Cohutta Wilderness Area. (34°58.29′N 84°34.37′W)
- Little Rock Creek Falls—in the Chattahoochee National Forest.
- Long Creek Falls—located near the Appalachian Trail near Three Forks.
- Noontootla Falls—on a small tributary of Noontootla Creek near Three Forks. (34°51.20′N 84°11.64′W)
- Sea Creek Falls—in the Cooper Creek area in eastern Fannin County, near the Union County line. (34°46.19′N 84°5.71′W)

=== Gilmer County ===
- Barnes Creek Falls—in the Cohutta Wilderness Area near Murray County line; nearby mountaintop offers commanding view of the valley and Fort Mountain. (34°49.57′N 84°34.94′W)
- Falls on Davis Creek—located on private property but can be viewed from Pleasant Hill Road (State Route 59) near the community of Pleasant Hill.
- Falls Branch Falls—twin falls, "Lower" and "Upper", on Falls Branch near its confluence with Stanley Creek in northeast Gilmer, near the Fannin County line. (34°47.04′N 84°18.13′W)
- Julie Anna Falls—a fifty-foot falls on Turniptown Creek in the Rich Turniptown Mountain Wilderness Area of the Chattahoochee National Forest. (34°44.05′N 84°21.10′W)
- Tumbling Waters—Tails Creek falls 75 feet (23 m) in a series of cascades on its approach to Carters Lake.

=== Habersham County ===
- Panther Creek Falls—located in the Panther Creek Recreation Area between Clarkesville and Tallulah Falls. (34°40.63′N 83°23.29′W)
- Shoals on Soque River—located on private property but readily accessible to the public. The Mark of the Potter, a potters' cooperative on Highway 197, occupies an old mill beside the Shoals, which can be viewed from the co-op's balcony. Coin-operated machines dispense food for fish and waterfowl. (34°43.78′N 83°35.35′W)
- Miner Shoals-located on private property, not accessible to the public. 48-foot (15 m) near vertical drop. "By far the best waterfall on the river" as stated by State Geologist S. W. McCallie in his Water Powers of Georgia, 1908.

=== Lumpkin County ===
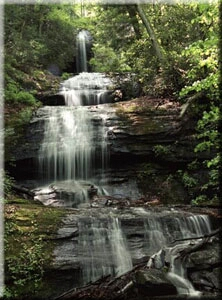
Upper DeSoto Falls, Lumpkin County, Georgia

- Black Falls—on the grounds of Camp Frank D. Merrill, a Mountain Ranger camp 11 miles (18 km) north of Dahlonega. Public access may be restricted.
- Blood Mountain Creek Falls—four falls (Lower Falls, Middle Falls, Upper Falls, and Cascade). (Trailhead for two lower falls: 34°41.87′N 83°57.18′W; for two upper falls: 34°42.40′N 83°57.30′W)
- Cane Creek Falls—located on the grounds of Camp Glisson, a camp operated by the United Methodist Church near Dahlonega, these falls are often (but not always) open to the public.
- Cannon Falls— located on Frogtown Creek, on the grounds of Cannon Falls Lodge, a private fishing preserve, and only accessible with a guide.
- Clay Creek Falls—located on private property but easily viewed from Clay Creek Falls Road, just outside the city limits of Dahlonega. (34°32.26′N 84°1.32′W)
- Copper Mine Shoals—there are several rapid drops on the Chestatee River north of Dahlonega.
- Cow Rock Creek Falls—near Boggs Creek Campground in the Chattahoochee National Forest. (34°42.66′N 83°52.90′W)
- DeSoto Falls—a pair of falls on Frogtown Creek in the DeSoto Falls Scenic Area of the Chattahoochee National Forest. According to legend, Hernando de Soto passed through the area in 1540. (34°42.37′N 83°54.95′W)
- Dick's Creek Falls—a pair of falls just below the site where Waters Creek joins Dicks Creek in the Chattahoochee National Forest. (34°40.782′N 83°56.202′W)
- Elvarado Falls—not open to the public.
- Etowah River Shoals—the Etowah River rises in Lumpkin County, northwest of Dahlonega
- Falls on Branch of Jones Creek—located in the Chattahoochee National Forest and easily accessible. (34°36.618′N 84°9.45′W)
- Falls on West Fork of Montgomery Creek—twenty-foot falls on the grounds of a US Army Ranger Camp. (34°37.452′N 84°6.9′W)
- Grindle Shoals—on private property along the Chestatee River but viewable from the bridge carrying Cavender Creek Road across the Chestatee in eastern Lumpkin, near the White County line. (34°33.6′N 83°52.26′W)
- High Shoals Falls—on Walden Creek; features a porch swing from which to view the falls. (34°38.91′N 84°1.332′W)
- Jones Creek Falls
- Little Ridge Creek Falls—a trio of falls near Boggs Creek Campground in the Chattahoochee National Forest. (34°42.42′N 83°53.4′W)
- Martha Falls—on Pigeon Roost Creek; the area features spectacular lake and mountain views. (34°41.37′N 83°58.83′W)
- Trophy Falls— located on Frogtown Creek, on the grounds of Cannon Falls Lodge, a private fishing preserve, and only accessible with a guide.
- Ward Creek Falls—near Justus Gap, northwest of Dahlonega. {34° 39.107'N 84° 04.071'W}
- Yahoola Creek Falls—just before the Yahoola Creek leaves the Chattahoochee National Forest. The remnants of Nineteenth Century gold-mining operations are nearby.

=== Murray County ===
- Jigger Falls—on Jigger Creek, in the Cohutta Wilderness Area.
- Mill Creek Falls—falls, shoals, and cascade on Mill Creek in Hickey Gap. Conasauga Lake, a high mountain lake, sits nearby. (Falls parking area: 34°53.61′N 84°40.26′W)

=== Pickens County ===
- Long Swamp Creek Falls—sixty-foot falls located on private property; access may be granted by land owners. (34°29.25′N 84°23.232′W)

=== Rabun County ===
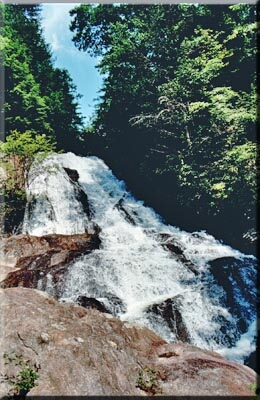
Dick's Creek Falls, Rabun County, Georgia

Rabun County is not only mountainous (the Eastern Continental Divide passes through the county, which has a number of peaks whose heights surpass 4,000 feet (1,200 m) above sea level) but it is also one of the rainiest areas east of the Mississippi River. These factors combine to produce many dramatic falls.

- Ada-Hi Falls—in Black Rock Mountain State Park; features an observation deck and nearby mountain overlooks.
- Ammons Creek Falls—the trail to Holcomb Creek Falls is atwo-mile loop that also leads to a viewing deck at Ammons Creek Falls.
- Angel Falls (Georgia)—on Joe Branch Creek near Lake Rabun, surrounded by rhododendron; on the same trail as, and about one half mile beyond Panther Falls.
- Bad Branch Falls—an easy walk from the trailhead. Georgia Power Company maintains a recreation area near the trailhead. (34°59′N 83°20′W)
- Becky Branch Falls—on the Bartram Trail in Warwoman Dell. (34°53.04′N 83°21.15′W)
- Big Creek Falls—(34°59′N 83°11.6′W)
- Bull Sluice Rapids—Class V Rapids on the Chattooga River; the location is actually best approached from the South Carolina side of the river. (34°48.86′N 83°18.38′W)
- Caledonia Cascade—also known as Cascade Falls, at 600 feet (180 m) in height it is tied (with Cochrans Falls) as the second-tallest waterfall in Georgia. It is located on a small stream that joins the Tallulah River near the beginning of the Tallulah Gorge.
- Crow Creek Falls—a series of falls, one visible from Crow Creek Road, another approximately 300 yards from the road.
- Darnell Falls (NA)
- Dick's Creek Falls—60-foot falls where Dick's Creek meets the Chattooga River, which marks the border with South Carolina; located in the Chattooga National Wild and Scenic River Area. (34°52.07′N 83°14.77′W)
- Dolly Falls (NA)
- Estatoah Falls—on private property but may be viewed from several points along Highway 246. (34°59.46′N 83°20.88′W)
- Hemlock Falls & Upper Falls—on Moccasin Creek in Moccasin Creek State Park. (34°51.151′N 83°36.655′W)

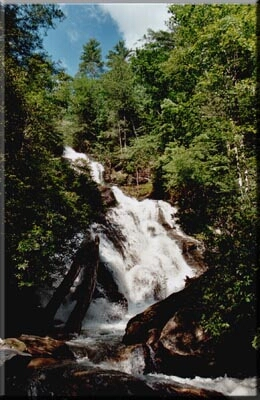
Holcomb Creek Falls, Rabun County, Georgia

- Upper Falls on Holcomb Creek—several hundred feet of cascades on Holcomb Creek. The approach includes a viewing platform.
- Kilby Mill Falls—(Parking area: 34°56.84′N 83°29.66′W)
- Laural Falls—on the grounds of Kingswood Golf Course in Clayton.
- Martin Creek Falls—features an observation deck. (34°53.568′N 83°20.961′W)
- Minnehaha Falls—100 foot falls near the Lake Seed Dam and Rabun Beach Recreation Area; the falls are a short hike from a small parking area. Minnehaha Falls were featured on the cover of the 2007 Georgia Travel Guide. (34°44.85′N 83°28.84′W)
- Mud Creek Falls—within the gated community of Sky Valley, below the dam and golf course. (34°59′N 83°20′W)
- Panther Falls—near Rabun Beach Camping Area #2; the trail continues beyond Panther Falls to the larger Angel Falls.
- Singley's Falls—Overflow Creek drops 150 feet (46 m) to meet Big Creek and Holcomb Creek, forming the West Fork of the Chattooga River. (34°58.5′N 83°13.24′W)
- Stonewall Creek Falls—there is a primitive camp ground at the base of the falls. (34°49.232′N 83°27.001′W)
- Sylvan Mill Falls— located at the Sylvan Falls Mill Bed & Breakfast in Mountain City. Although the falls are on private property they may be viewed from the road. (34°55.66′N 83°25.21′W)
- Tallulah Gorge State Park—managed jointly by the Georgia State Parks system and Georgia Power Company, the latter of which operates the hydroelectric dam above the 600-foot-deep (180 m) Tallulah Gorge. The Tallulah River flows over six major falls between the Tallulah Falls Dam and Lake Tugalo. Since the dam was built in 1913 only a fraction of the natural volume of water flows through the gorge, but on scheduled "whitewater weekends" in April and November the amount may increase by more than tenfold. Other "aesthetic releases" are sometimes staged. Access to the floor of the gorge is controlled by permit. (Parking area: 34°44.419′N 83°23.388′W)

L'Eau d'Or Falls—46-foot falls.
Tempesta Falls—76-foot falls.
Hurricane Falls—96-foot falls.
Oceana Falls—50-foot falls.
Bridal Veil—17-foot falls flows over a smooth "sliding rock" popular with visitors who use it as a natural water slide.
Sweet Sixteen—16-foot falls.

- Three Forks—located in the Chattooga Wild and Scenic River Area; Holcomb Creek, Overflow Creek and Big Creek meet at Three Forks to form the West Fork of the Chattooga River. (34°58.1′N 83°12.80′W)
- Timpson Creek Falls—located near Clayton and the Chattahoochee National Forest; may be on private property. (34°53.30′N 83°28.94′W)
- Wildcat Creek Falls—visible from West Wildcat Road (Fire Service Road 127). (34°50.1′N 83°36.30′W)

=== Stephens County ===
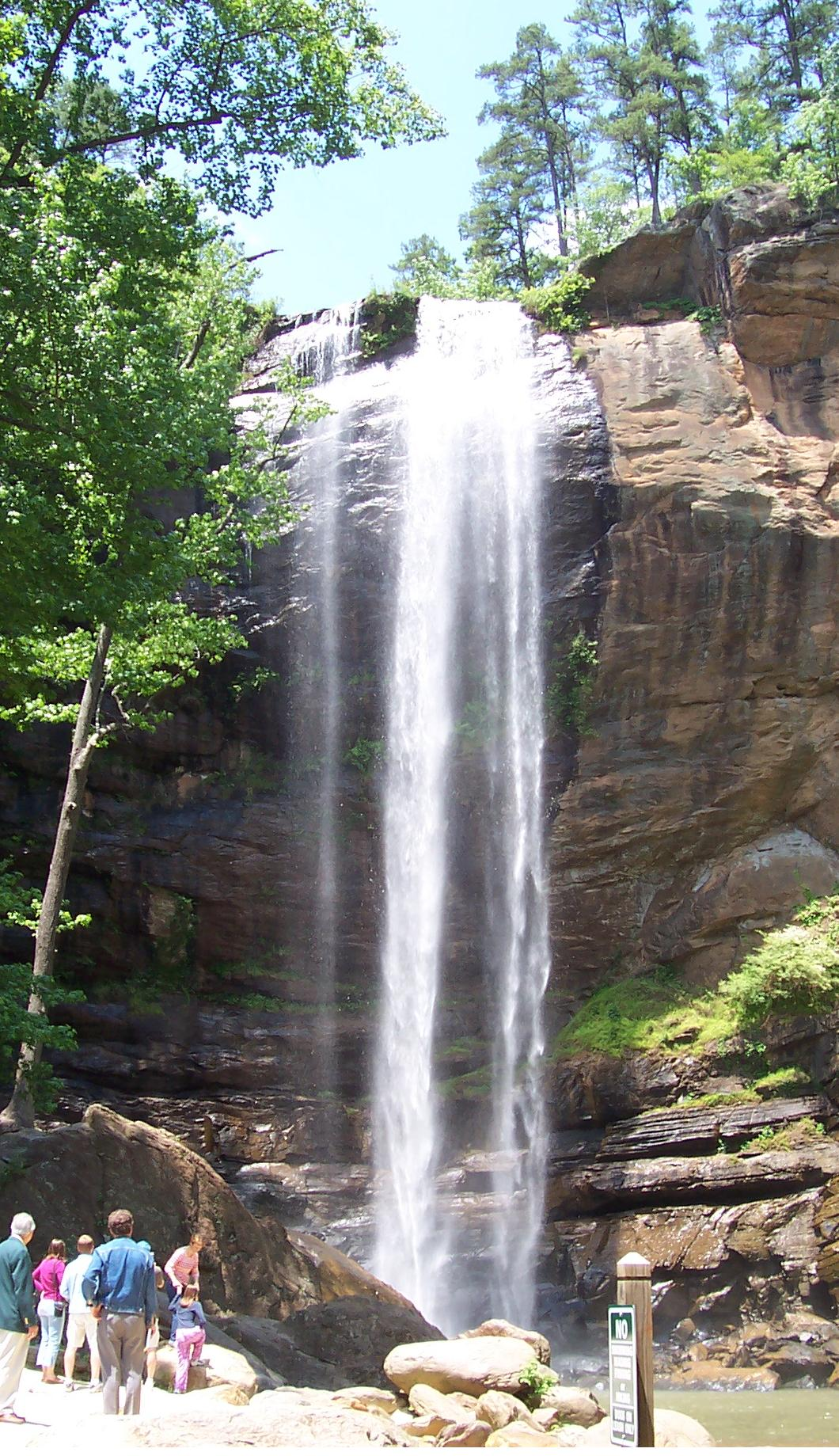
Toccoa Falls, Stephens County, Georgia

- Toccoa Falls—dramatic 186-foot (57 m) falls located on the grounds of Toccoa Falls College in the city of Toccoa. The falls may be reached by a short, paved pathway and are accessible to the handicapped. The college charges a nominal fee for admission to the site. In 1977 a dam break just above the falls devastated the college and caused thirty-nine deaths. The site includes a memorial to those who perished. (34°35.64′N 83°21.666′W)

=== Towns County ===
- Blue Hole Falls and High Shoals Creek Falls—located on High Shoals Creek in the High Shoals Scenic Area of the Chattahoochee National Forest; features two observation decks. (34°48.972′N 83°43.62′W)
- Denton Branch Falls—easily accessible thirty-foot falls located near Tate City; the approach reveals numerous smaller falls and shoals. (34°59.142′N 83°33.00′W)
- Cupid Falls—near Young Harris College in Young Harris. (34°56.1′N 83°50.34′W)
- Enota Mountain Retreat & Conference Center—the grounds of this facility in Hiawassee contain several falls; visitors must obtain permission before accessing the property.

Gurley Creek Falls—220-foot falls viewable from an observation deck a short walk from the visitors center. (34°50.298′N 83°46.8′W)
Joel Creek Falls—a ten-minute walk from the visitors center. (34°50.1′N 83°46.602′W)

=== Union County ===
- Canada Creek Falls–there are several falls on Canada Creek, both within the boundaries of the Chattahoochee National Forest and after the creek enters private lands. The Upper Falls are on public land, above the confluence of the Wildhog Creek and Canada Creek. (Upper Falls: 34°41.44′N 84°02.53′W; other falls: 34°41.04′N 84°03.82′W)
- Falls on the Upper Chattahoochee—on the headwaters of the Chattahoochee River, which rushes through a two-foot-wide channel at one point. (Parking area: )
- Helton Creek Falls–a pair of falls in a rhododendron grove in the Chattahoochee National Forest; the approach includes a well-maintained stairway and an observation platform. (34°45.2′N 83°53.7′W)
- Horsetrough Falls–an easily accessible falls located where Horsetrough Creek joins the headwaters of the Chattahoochee River, in the southeast corner of the county; the approach includes a footbridge which is the first bridge on the Chattahoochee. (34°47.53′N 83°47.24′W)
- Lake Trahlyta Spillway–on Wolf Creek just below the dam in Vogel State Park; the approach includes a boardwalk trail and an observation platform.

=== Walker County ===
- Glen Falls—a series of small falls on Lookout Mountain near Chattanooga, close to the Tennessee line, maintained by the National Park Service.
- Keown Falls—located in the Keown Falls Scenic Area near the cities of Villanow and LaFayette, the falls flow over a wide cliff, sometimes as a narrow, freefalling ribbon of water. (34°36.80′N 85°05.70′W)
- Lula Falls—two falls on Rock Creek, on Lookout Mountain. The property is owned by the Lula Lake Land Trust and the public is welcome on the first and last Saturday of every month. Other unusual geological features can be found on the property. (34°55.96′N 85°22.34′W)
- Pocket Branch Falls—Pocket Branch flows out of a canyon on the west side of Pigeon Mountain, in the Pigeon Mountain Wildlife Management Area. The Shirley Miller Wildflower Trail is a boardwalk trail below the falls. (Parking area: 34°42.75′N 85°22.80′W)

=== White County ===
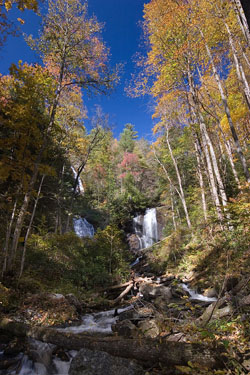
Anna Ruby Falls, White County, Georgia

- Anna Ruby Falls—actually two separate falls, one on Curtis Creek and the other on York Creek, but known together as Anna Ruby Falls. Combined, they form Smith Creek. Located in a grove of mountain laurel in the Anna Ruby Falls Scenic Area in the Chattahoochee National Forest. There is a visitors center and an interpretive walk from there to the falls. (34°45.83′N 83°42.73′W)
- Duke's Creek Falls—actually on Davis Creek, where it meets Dodd Creek to form Duke's Creek; there is an easy approach featuring boardwalk trails and several observation decks. At least one deck is wheelchair accessible. (Parking Area: 34°42.105′N 83°47.361′W)
- Falls near Unicoi Gap—just off Fire Service Road 44.
- Falls on Dodd Creek—at Dukes Creek Falls.
- Falls on Low Gap Creek—off Fire Service Road 44A near Robertstown. (34°44.60′N 83°47.84′W)
- Raven Cliff Falls—the approach, through rhododendron and hemlock passes many smaller falls; located within the Mark Trail Wilderness Area near the Richard Russell Scenic Highway. (34°43.38′N 83°49.44′W)
- Upper Falls on Davis Creek

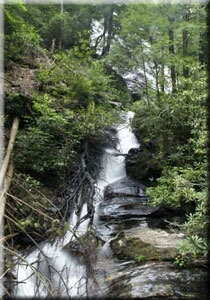
Duke's Creek Falls, White County, Georgia

== See also ==
- List of waterfalls
