= Bad Branch Falls =

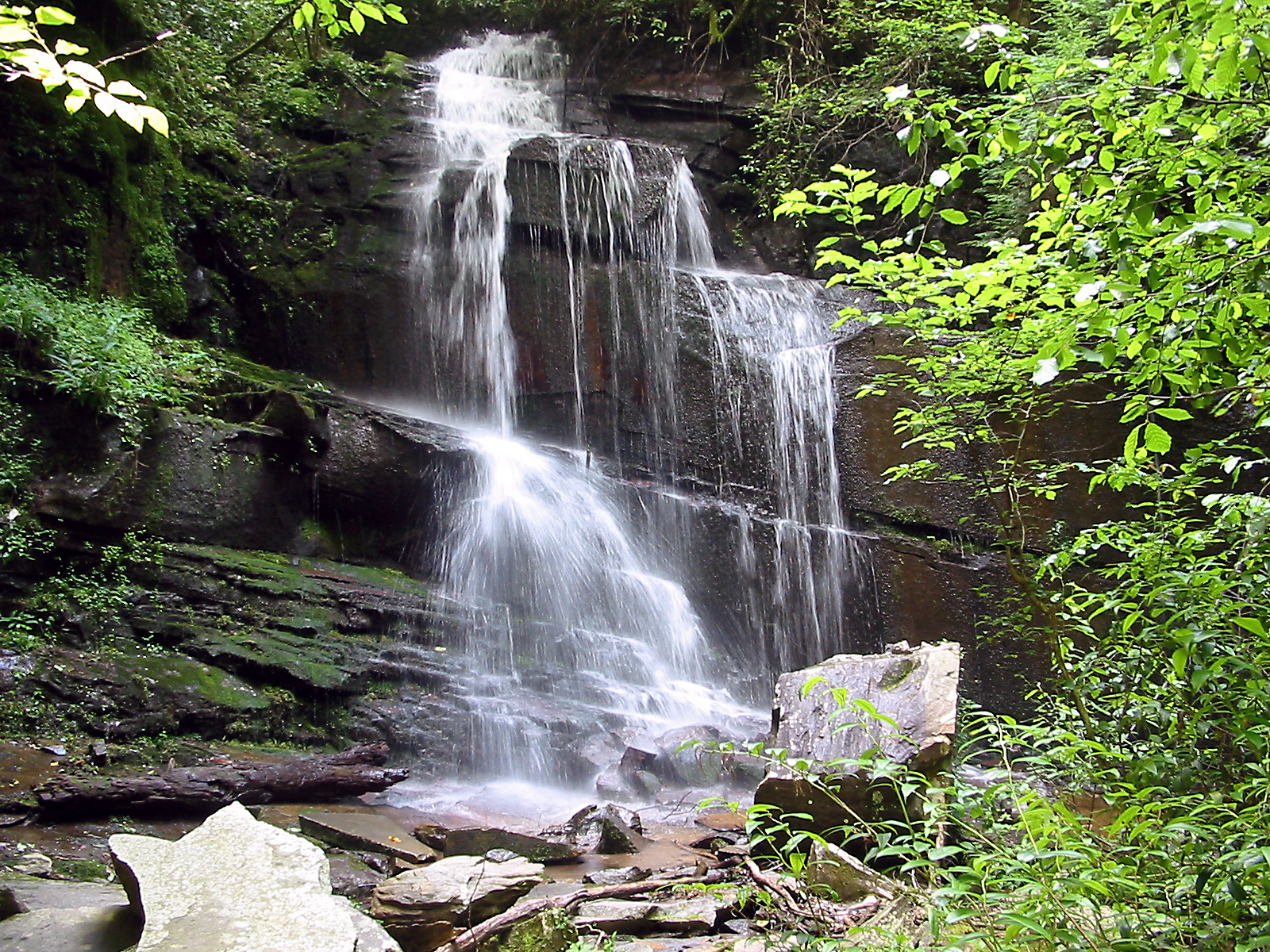
- Interactive map of Bad Branch Falls
- Location: Rabun County, Georgia
- Coordinates: 34.765182°N 83.519333°W
- Type: Cascade
- Watercourse: Bad Branch Creek

Bad Branch Falls is a partially manmade waterfall located in Chattahoochee National Forest, Rabun County, in the U.S. State of Georgia, on the site of an old quarry. It is near Lake Rabun and Lake Seed.

== See also ==
List of waterfalls in North Georgia
