= National Register of Historic Places listings in Rabun County, Georgia =

Location of Rabun County in Georgia

This is a list of properties and districts in Rabun County, Georgia that are listed on the National Register of Historic Places (NRHP).

This National Park Service list is complete through NPS recent listings posted March 21, 2025.

== Current listings ==
	Name on the Register	Image	Date listed	Location	City or town	Description
1	Hambidge Center Historic District	Hambidge Center Historic District	October 5, 1982 (#82000146)	W of Dillard on Betty's Creek Rd. 34°59′13″N 83°26′19″W	Dillard	
2	Asbury and Sallie Hodgson House	Asbury and Sallie Hodgson House	August 24, 2011 (#11000579)	278 White St. 34°58′46″N 83°23′06″W	Dillard	
3	Hoojah Branch Site (9RA34)		January 24, 1987 (#86003667)	Address Restricted	Dillard	In the Chattahoochee-Oconee National Forest
4	James Henry and Rachel Kilby House		February 24, 2005 (#05000078)	28 Tumbling Waters Ln. 34°56′39″N 83°29′40″W	Clayton	
5	Pine Tree Tea Room		February 21, 2025 (#100011455)	1659 Lake Rabun Road; 34°46′15″N 83°26′05″W	Lakemont	
6	William E. and Sarah Dillard Powell House	William E. and Sarah Dillard Powell House	January 2, 2008 (#07001337)	219 Boxwood Terrace; 34°58′18″N 83°22′55″W	Dillard	
7	Tallulah Falls Depot	Tallulah Falls Depot	May 31, 1988 (#88000607)	US 441; 34°44′10″N 83°23′32″W	Tallulah Falls	
8	York House	York House	September 9, 1982 (#82002459)	North of Mountain City off US 23/441; 34°56′14″N 83°23′00″W	Mountain City	
