= Ammons Creek Falls =

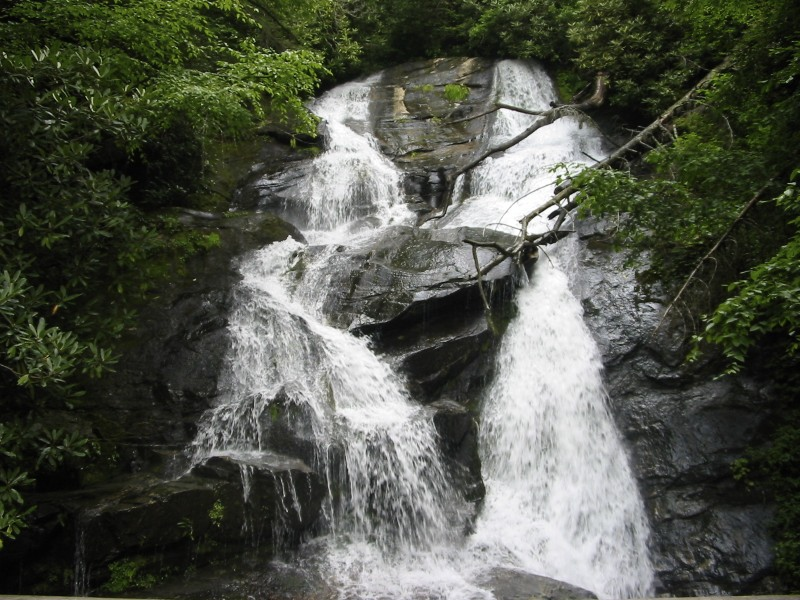

- Location within Georgia
- Location: Rabun County, Georgia
- Coordinates: 34.983433°N 83.266835°W
- Type: Cascade
- Total height: 40 ft (12 m)
- Watercourse: Ammons Creek

Ammons Creek Falls is a waterfall located in the Tallulah Ranger District of the Chattahoochee National Forest in Rabun County, Georgia that cascades for over 100 feet. There is 1.75 mile loop hiking trail that provides access to both nearby Holcomb Creek Falls and Ammons Creek Falls. There is a wooden observation deck for viewing the falls.

The falls can be accessed from Clayton by taking Warwoman Road east for 10 miles. Turn left onto Hale Ridge Road (Forest Service Road 7) for 7 miles until it intersects Overflow Road (Forest Service Road 86).

== See also ==
- List of waterfalls
- List of Waterfalls of Georgia (U.S. state)
