= Lake Tugalo =

Reservoir in Georgia and South Carolina, U.S.

- Location within South Carolina
- Location: Georgia/South Carolina
- Coordinates: 34°43′48″N 83°21′07″W
- Primary inflows: Tallulah River, Chattooga River
- Primary outflows: Tallulah River
- Basin countries: United States
- Surface area: 597 acres (2.42 km^{2})
- Surface elevation: 889 ft (271 m)

Lake Tugalo is a 597-acre (2.42 km^{2}) reservoir with 18 miles (29 km) of shoreline located in the northeastern Georgia in Habersham and Rabun counties, but also lies partially in Oconee County, South Carolina, wherein the lake also contains the westernmost part of South Carolina. It is the fifth lake in a six-lake series created by hydroelectric dams operated by Georgia Power that follows the original course of the Tallulah River. The series starts upstream on the Tallulah River with Lake Burton followed by Lake Seed, Lake Rabun, Lake Tallulah Falls and Lake Tugalo, ending with Lake Yonah. The western arm of Lake Tugalo is filled by the Tallulah River and the eastern arm is filled by the Chattooga River. Georgia Power considers the lake full at a surface elevation of 891.5 feet (271.7 m).

Lake Tugalo began filling in 1923 with the completion of the Tugalo Dam, a gravity concrete and masonry dam. The dam is 155 feet (47 m) high and has a span of 740 feet (230 m). The Tugalo Hydroelectric Plant has a generation capacity of 45 megawatts.

== See also ==
- List of lakes in South Carolina

== Sources ==
- Georgia Power lake levels
