= Georgia Power =

Electric utility in Atlanta, Georgia

- Type: Subsidiary
- Industry: Utilities
- Founded: 1945; 81 years ago
- Headquarters: Atlanta, Georgia, U.S.
- Key people: Kim Greene (Chairman, president & CEO)
- Number of employees: 6,757 (as of December 31, 2024)
- Parent: Southern Company
- Website: georgiapower.com

Georgia Power is an electric utility headquartered in Atlanta, Georgia, United States. It was established as the Georgia Railway and Power Company and began operations in 1902 running streetcars in Atlanta as a successor to the Atlanta Consolidated Street Railway Company.

Georgia Power is the largest of the four electric utilities that are owned and operated by Southern Company. Georgia Power is an investor-owned, tax-paying public utility that serves more than 2.8 million customers in all but four of Georgia's 159 counties. At the end of 2024, the company had 6,757 employees. The Georgia Power Building, its primary corporate office building, is located at 241 Ralph McGill Boulevard in downtown Atlanta.

In 2006, the Savannah Electric & Power Company, a separate subsidiary of Southern Company, was merged into Georgia Power.

== History ==
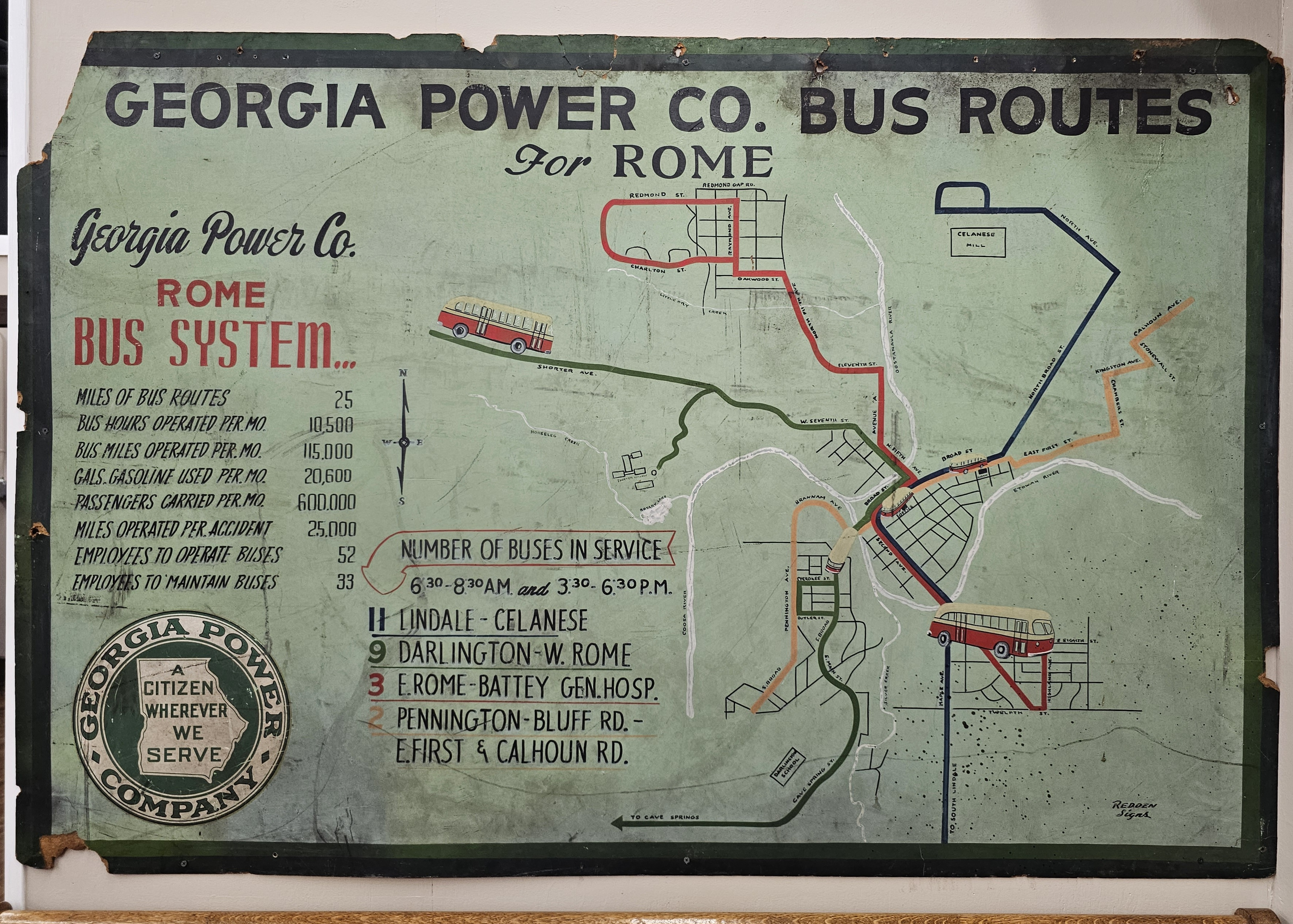
Map of Georgia Power's bus routes in Rome, Georgia

Originally the Georgia Railway and Power Company, it began in 1902 as a company running the streetcars in Atlanta and was the successor to the Atlanta Consolidated Street Railway Company. In the 1930s, the company published a free newsletter called Two Bells which was distributed on its streetcars. Two Bells was carried on being distributed into the 1960s on the buses of a successor Atlanta Transit Company (ATC). From 1937 until 1950, Georgia Power also operated trolleybuses in Atlanta, and in 1950 its network of 31 electric bus routes was the largest trolley bus system in the United States. After the Atlanta transit strike of 1950, the Atlanta Transit Company took over operations. In 2003, the nonprofit Atlanta Streetcar, Inc. was founded with a goal of returning streetcar service to the city, initially focused on a line along Peachtree Street; this advocacy eventually contributed to the opening of the modern Atlanta Streetcar system in downtown Atlanta in 2014.

The company built several dams, including the Morgan Falls Dam just north of the city, and some as far away as the Tallulah River in the northeast Georgia mountains. These hydroelectric dams form Lake Burton, Lake Seed, Lake Rabun, Lake Tallulah Falls, Lake Tugalo, and Lake Yonah, the last two of which straddle the Georgia – South Carolina border on the Tugaloo River.

Following cost increases in August 2018 for building two additional nuclear reactors at its Vogtle Electric Generating Plant, credit rating agency Moody's downgraded Georgia Power's credit ratings from A3 (upper medium) to Baa1 (lower medium).

In September 2018, in order to sustain the project, Georgia Power agreed to pay an additional proportion of the costs of the smaller project partners if completion costs exceeded $9.2 billion.

In 2019, Georgia Power's CEO, Paul Bowers, testified before state regulators seeking to get an approval for the company's request to add about $200 a year to the average residential customer's bills. In June 2021, Georgia Power again sought a $235 million a year rates increase once Vogtle unit 3 starts operation, an overall 10% increase in rates, to recover capital construction costs and operating costs.

Kim Greene became chairman, president, and CEO of Georgia Power in 2023.

== Plant Vogtle nuclear expansion ==
In addition to its original two reactors, completed in 1987 and 1989, Georgia Power and its co-owners — Oglethorpe Power, the Municipal Electric Authority of Georgia, and Dalton Utilities — built two new nuclear units, Vogtle 3 and 4, at the plant near Waynesboro. The project was certified by the Georgia Public Service Commission in March 2009. It became the first new nuclear construction in the United States in more than three decades, but it was delayed by roughly seven years and ran far over its original budget, with total project costs eventually surpassing $35 billion — more than $20 billion above initial estimates. Unit 3 entered commercial operation on July 31, 2023, and Unit 4 followed on April 29, 2024, bringing Plant Vogtle's total capacity to nearly 5,000 megawatts and making it the largest nuclear power plant in the United States.

Late in 2023, state regulators approved a settlement allowing Georgia Power to recover $7.56 billion of the project's construction costs from ratepayers; combined with an earlier increase, the cumulative effect raised the average residential customer's monthly bill by about $14.38 once both new units were in service. Supporters credited the project with adding a large source of carbon-free baseload power amid rising statewide electricity demand, while critics — including commission staff who testified during the proceedings — argued ratepayers would have been better served by alternative resources such as natural gas or solar paired with battery storage.

== Resource planning and data center-driven demand growth ==
Beginning in the mid-2020s, Georgia Power's long-range planning was reshaped by a sharp rise in projected electricity demand from data centers and other large industrial customers. The company filed its 2025 Integrated Resource Plan with the Georgia Public Service Commission on January 31, 2025, and the commission approved it that July, projecting approximately 8,200 to 8,500 megawatts of electrical load growth over six years, with the large majority attributed to data centers. To help meet that projected demand, the approved plan reversed earlier commitments to retire several coal-fired units, including at plants Bowen and Scherer, and authorized up to 4,000 megawatts of new renewable energy, 1,500 megawatts of battery storage, and additional natural gas capacity. In December 2025, the commission separately certified approximately 9,885 megawatts of new generation capacity for Georgia Power to build or procure for 2028–2031, including new natural gas units at plants Bowen, Wansley, and McIntosh, along with battery storage projects and power-purchase agreements with other suppliers.

Consumer and environmental advocates — including the Southern Alliance for Clean Energy and the Natural Resources Defense Council, who criticized the July 2025 plan, and the Southern Environmental Law Center and the Sierra Club, who criticized the December 2025 certification — argued the plans relied too heavily on fossil fuels and certified large amounts of new capacity based partly on data center contracts that had not yet been finalized, warning that ratepayers could ultimately bear the cost if the anticipated load failed to materialize. Georgia Power and commission officials said the agreements were structured so that large new industrial customers, rather than existing residential and small-business customers, would cover the cost of the new capacity. In January 2026, the Southern Environmental Law Center and the Sierra Club asked the commission to reconsider its December certification, arguing the legal standard for approval had not been met; the commission's Republican majority denied that request the following month, and in March 2026 the groups petitioned the Fulton County Superior Court to overturn the certification.

Separately, in July 2025 the commission approved a deal under which Georgia Power agreed to freeze its base electric rates through at least the end of 2028 rather than file an expected 2025 rate case, ending a stretch of six base-rate increases over the preceding three years. The freeze does not cover a separate proceeding, expected in the first half of 2026, to recover costs related to 2025 storm damage.

== Environmental record ==
=== Coal ash pond closures ===
Since 2015, Georgia Power has been required under federal and state coal combustion residuals rules to close all 29 ash ponds at its 11 coal-fired power plants. The company has estimated the project will cost nearly $9 billion over 60 years. The company's plan calls for fully excavating ash from roughly 19 to 20 of the ponds and relocating it to lined landfills, while sealing the remaining ponds in place. In 2019, the Georgia Public Service Commission approved Georgia Power's plan to recover an estimated $525 million of the closure costs from ratepayers; the Sierra Club sued to block the cost recovery, arguing the company rather than its customers should bear the expense, but the Georgia Court of Appeals upheld the commission's decision and the Georgia Supreme Court later declined to review the case.

Environmental groups, including the Southern Environmental Law Center and the Altamaha Riverkeeper, have criticized Georgia Power's plan to leave coal ash in place at several sites, including Plant Scherer, arguing it remains in contact with groundwater in unlined pits in violation of federal rules. A similar dispute has played out over Plant Hammond; Georgia Power has said its closure plans comply with both state and federal regulations. In late 2024, Georgia Power reached confidential settlements with dozens of plaintiffs near Plant Scherer who alleged that coal ash from the plant had contaminated their well water and caused illnesses; a county judge had separately found that water samples did not support the plaintiffs' claims.

=== Oil pollution prevention violation ===
In August 2022, the EPA fined Georgia Power $1,906 after an Atlanta facility failed an audit for oil spill prevention. Among other violations, it was found that Georgia Power had no method of predicting a potential oil spill, no containment plan, and inadequate facility drainage.

== Coal power ==
Georgia Power operates the Robert W. Scherer Power Plant, also known as Plant Scherer, in Monroe County, Georgia. According to Natural History Magazine, in 2006 Plant Scherer was the largest single point-source for carbon dioxide emissions in the United States. It was also ranked the 20th in the world in terms of carbon dioxide emissions by the Center for Global Development on its list of global power plants in November 2007. It was the only power plant in the United States that was listed among the world's top 25 carbon dioxide producers.

=== Transmission system ===
Georgia Power utilizes transmission lines carrying 115,000 volts, 230,000 volts and 500,000 volts. Georgia Power has interconnections with the Tennessee Valley Authority to the north, sister company Alabama Power to the west, Dominion Energy and Duke Energy to the east, and Florida Power & Light to the south.

=== Transition to renewables and Plant Mitchell shutdown ===
Georgia Power asked the state's public service commission for approval to convert the coal-fired Plant Mitchell to run on wood fuel. If approved, the retrofit would have begun in 2011 and the biomass plant would have started operating in mid-2012. The 96 MW (129,000 hp) biomass plant would have run on surplus wood from suppliers within a 100 mi (160 km) radius of the plant, which is located near Albany, Georgia. However, in 2014, the company announced it was decertifying the plant and intended to close its operations by April 2015; Plant Mitchell was shut down in 2016; as of 2022, discharged water from the plant's ash pond is being monitored. More recently, under the company's 2025 Integrated Resource Plan, regulators approved keeping several other coal-fired units online beyond their previously planned retirement dates in order to meet rising demand from data centers (see above).

== Generating facilities ==
Georgia Power owns and operates a total of 46 generating plants which include hydroelectric dams, fossil fueled generating plants and nuclear power plants, which provide electricity to more than 2.8 million customers in all but four of Georgia's counties. As of December 31, 2024, the company's combined generating capacity was approximately 14.8 million kilowatts, and its 2024 energy mix was approximately 40 percent natural gas and oil, 29 percent nuclear, 16 percent coal, 8 percent renewables, and 2 percent hydroelectric.

=== Hydroelectric dams ===
Georgia Power Hydro incorporates 19 hydro electric generating units to produce a generation capacity of 1,087,536 kilowatts (KW). Georgia Power Hydro facilities also provide more than 45,985 acres (18,609 ha) of water and more than 1,057 mi (1,701 km) of shoreline for habitat and recreational use.

Plant	Nearest city	Capacity
Barnett Shoals Hydroelectric Generating Plant	Athens, Georgia	2,800 kW
Bartletts Ferry Hydroelectric Generating Plant	Columbus, Georgia	173,000 kW
Burton Hydroelectric Generating Plant	Clayton, Georgia	6,120 kW
Estatoah Hydroelectric Generating Plant	Mountain City, Georgia	240 kW
Flint River Hydroelectric Generating Plant	Albany, Georgia	5,400 kW
Goat Rock Hydroelectric Generating Plant	Columbus, Georgia	38,600 kW
Langdale Hydroelectric Generating Plant	West Point, Georgia	1,040 kW
Lloyd Shoals Hydroelectric Generating Plant	Jackson, Georgia	14,400 kW
Morgan Falls Hydroelectric Generating Plant	Sandy Springs, Georgia	16,800 kW
Nacoochee Hydroelectric Generating Plant	Clayton, Georgia	4,800 kW
North Highlands Hydroelectric Generating Plant	Columbus, Georgia	29,600 kW
Oliver Dam Hydroelectric Generating Plant	Columbus, Georgia	60,000 kW
Riverview Hydroelectric Generating Plant	West Point, Georgia	480 kW
Rocky Mountain Hydroelectric Generating Plant	Rome, Georgia	215,256 kW
Sinclair Dam Hydroelectric Generating Plant	Eatonton, Georgia	45,000 kW
Tallulah Falls Hydroelectric Generating Plant	Tallulah Falls, Georgia	72,000 kW
Terrora Hydroelectric Generating Plant	Tallulah Falls, Georgia	16,000 kW
Tugalo Hydroelectric Generating Plant	Lakemont, Georgia	45,000 kW
Wallace Dam Hydroelectric Generating Plant	Eatonton, Georgia	321,300 kW
Yonah Hydroelectric Generating Plant	Lakemont, Georgia	22,500 kW

=== Fossil fuel power plants ===
Plant	Nearest city	Number of units	Capacity
Bowen Steam-Electric Generating Plant (Plant Bowen)	Cartersville, Georgia	4	3,160,000 kW
Harllee Branch Jr. Steam-Electric Generating Plant (Plant Branch) (CLOSED)	Eatonton, Georgia	4	1,539,700 kW
William P. Hammond Steam-Electric Generating Plant [CLOSED]	Rome, Georgia	4	800,000 kW
Kraft Steam-Electric Generating Plant	Savannah, Georgia	4	281,136 kW
John J. McDonough Steam-Electric Generating Plant	Smyrna, Georgia	2	490,000 kW
McIntosh Steam-Electric Generating Plant	Savannah, Georgia	9	810,000 kW
McIntosh Combined Cycle Plant	Rincon, Georgia	2	1,240,000 kW
Clifford Braswall McManus Steam-Electric Generating Plant	Brunswick, Georgia	2	596,000 kW
W. E. Mitchell Steam-Electric Generating Plant (31°26'41.13"N, 84°8'2.34"W)	Albany, Georgia	4	243,000 kW
Robins Steam-Electric Generating Plant	Warner Robins, Georgia	2	166,000 kW
Robert W. Scherer Steam-Electric Generating Plant (Plant Scherer)	Juliette, Georgia	4	3,272,000 kW
Wansley Steam-Electric Generating Plant (Plant Wansley)	Carrollton, Georgia	2	951,872 kW
Allen B. Wilson Combustion Turbine Plant	Waynesboro, Georgia		354,100 kW
Eugene A. Yates Steam-Electric Generating Plant	Newnan, Georgia	2	700,000 kW

=== Nuclear power plants ===
Plant	Nearest city	Number of units	Capacity
Alvin W. Vogtle Electric Generating Plant	Waynesboro, Georgia	4	4,536,000 kW
Edwin I. Hatch Nuclear Power Plant	Baxley, Georgia	2	1,726,000 kW

== Notes ==
- Kurtz, Wilber, "Technical Advisor: The Making of Gone With The Wind. The Hollywood Journals", Atlanta Historical Journal, Vol. XXII, No.2, Summer, 1978.
