= Hemlock Falls =

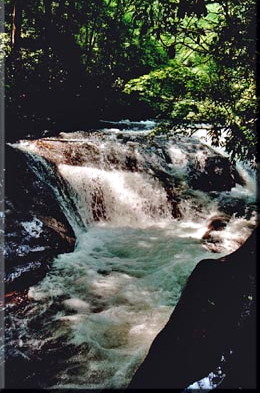

- Location within Georgia
- Location: Rabun County, Georgia
- Coordinates: 34.852517°N 83.610917°W
- Type: Cascade
- Elevation: 2,110 ft (640 m)
- Total height: 15 ft (4.6 m)
- Watercourse: Moccasin Creek

Hemlock Falls is a waterfall located in Rabun County, Georgia. It is located in the Tallulah Ranger District of the Chattahoochee National Forest on Moccasin Creek. The Hemlock Trail is about one mile long, beginning at Moccasin Creek State Park and following an old railroad bed.
