= Minnehaha Falls (Georgia) =

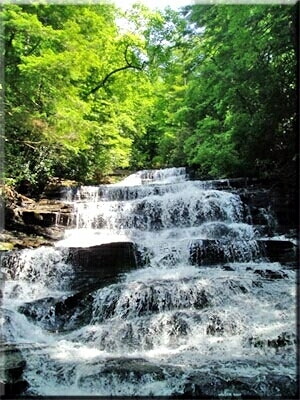
- Minnehaha Falls
- Interactive map of Minnehaha Falls
- Location: Rabun County, Georgia
- Coordinates: 34.747446°N 83.481119°W
- Type: Cascade
- Total height: 100 ft (30 m)

- For Minnehaha Falls in Minnesota, see Minnehaha Falls

Minnehaha Falls is a series of cascades located on Falls Creek in Rabun County, Georgia. The waterfalls descend about 100 feet over a stepped rock formation. The falls are near Lake Rabun, within the boundaries of the Chattooga River Ranger District of the Chattahoochee National Forest.

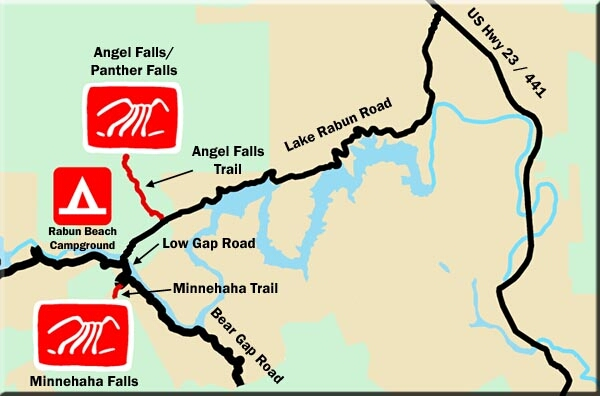
Location map for Minnehaha Falls

The falls are named for Minnehaha, a fictional character in the epic poem The Song of Hiawatha.

The falls can be reached by a short trail (0.4 miles) from Bear Gap Road called the Minnehaha Trail. The trail is maintained by the U.S. Forest Service.

== See also ==
- List of waterfalls
- List of Waterfalls of Georgia (U.S. state)
