= Tallulah Falls Lake =

- Tallulah Falls Dam

- Location within Georgia Location within the United States
- Location: Rabun County, Georgia
- Coordinates: 34°44′19″N 83°23′46″W
- Type: reservoir
- Primary inflows: Tallulah River
- Primary outflows: Tallulah River
- Basin countries: United States
- Surface area: 63 acres (25 ha)
- Shore length^{1}: 3.6 mi (5.8 km)
- Surface elevation: 1,483 ft (452 m)
- ^{1} Shore length is not a well-defined measure.

Tallulah Falls Lake is a 63-acre (250,000 m^{2}) reservoir with 3.6 miles (5.8 km) of shoreline located in the Northeastern corner of Georgia in Rabun County. It is the fourth and smallest lake in a six-lake series created by hydroelectric dams operated by Georgia Power that follows the original course of the Tallulah River. The series starts upstream on the Tallulah River with Lake Burton followed by Lake Seed, Lake Rabun, Tallulah Falls Lake, Lake Tugalo and Lake Yonah. Georgia Power considers the lake full at a surface elevation of 1,500 feet (460 m).

Tallulah Falls Lake was formed in 1914 with the completion of the Tallulah Falls Dam, a concrete dam with diversion tunnel. The diversion tunnel is 11 feet (3.4 m) wide, 14 feet (4.3 m) high, and 6,666 feet (2,032 m) long and was tunneled through solid rock and then lined with concrete. The dam is 126 feet (38 m) high and has a span of 426 feet (130 m). The Tallulah Falls Hydroelectric Plant is located 608 feet (185 m) lower than the dam at the lower end of the tunnel and has a generation capacity of 72,000 kilowatts.

== Sources ==
- Georgia Power Website for power plants
- Georgia Power lake levels
