= Lakemont, Georgia =

- Unincorporated community
- Location within Georgia
- Coordinates: 34°46′55″N 83°24′59″W
- Country: United States
- State: Georgia
- County: Rabun
- Elevation: 1,611 ft (491 m)
- Time zone: UTC-5 (Eastern (EST))
  - Summer (DST): UTC-4 (EDT)
- ZIP code: 30552
- Area codes: 706 & 762
- GNIS feature ID: 356348

Lakemont is an unincorporated community in Rabun County, Georgia, United States, located in a mountainous area between U.S. Route 23/441 and Lake Rabun. Lakemont has a post office with ZIP code 30552.

A post office named Lakemont was established in 1914. The community was so named on account of its elevated location near Lake Rabun.
