= Dick's Creek Falls =

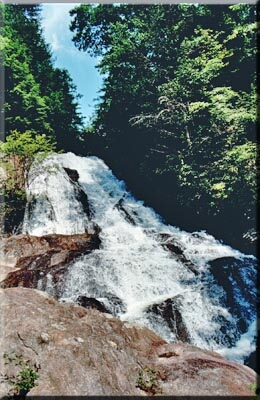
- Interactive map of Dick's Creek Falls
- Coordinates: 34.86731°N 83.245316°W
- Type: cascade
- Total height: 60 ft (18 m)
- Watercourse: Dick's Creek

Dick's Creek Falls is a waterfall that features a 60 ft (18 m) drop of Dicks Creek into the Chattooga River. Located in the Chattahoochee National Forest, it is reached by using the Dick's Creek Trail, which is short trail (about 1.4 miles in and out) that connects to the Bartram Trail in eastern Rabun County, Georgia.

== Directions ==
To reach the falls, take Warwoman Road from Clayton, Georgia east. Turn right on Sandy Ford Rd. Sandy Ford Rd. will make a left turn over a bridge and turn into a dirt road. Follow the narrow dirt road until the creek crosses over the road. Just before this splash-through is the small parking area for the trail. The trail will appear to fork, and you should follow the fork to the right alongside the creek. The trail will cross Bartram Trail. Cross the bridge in front of you to continue to the falls. The falls will be on your right as you approach the Chattooga River.

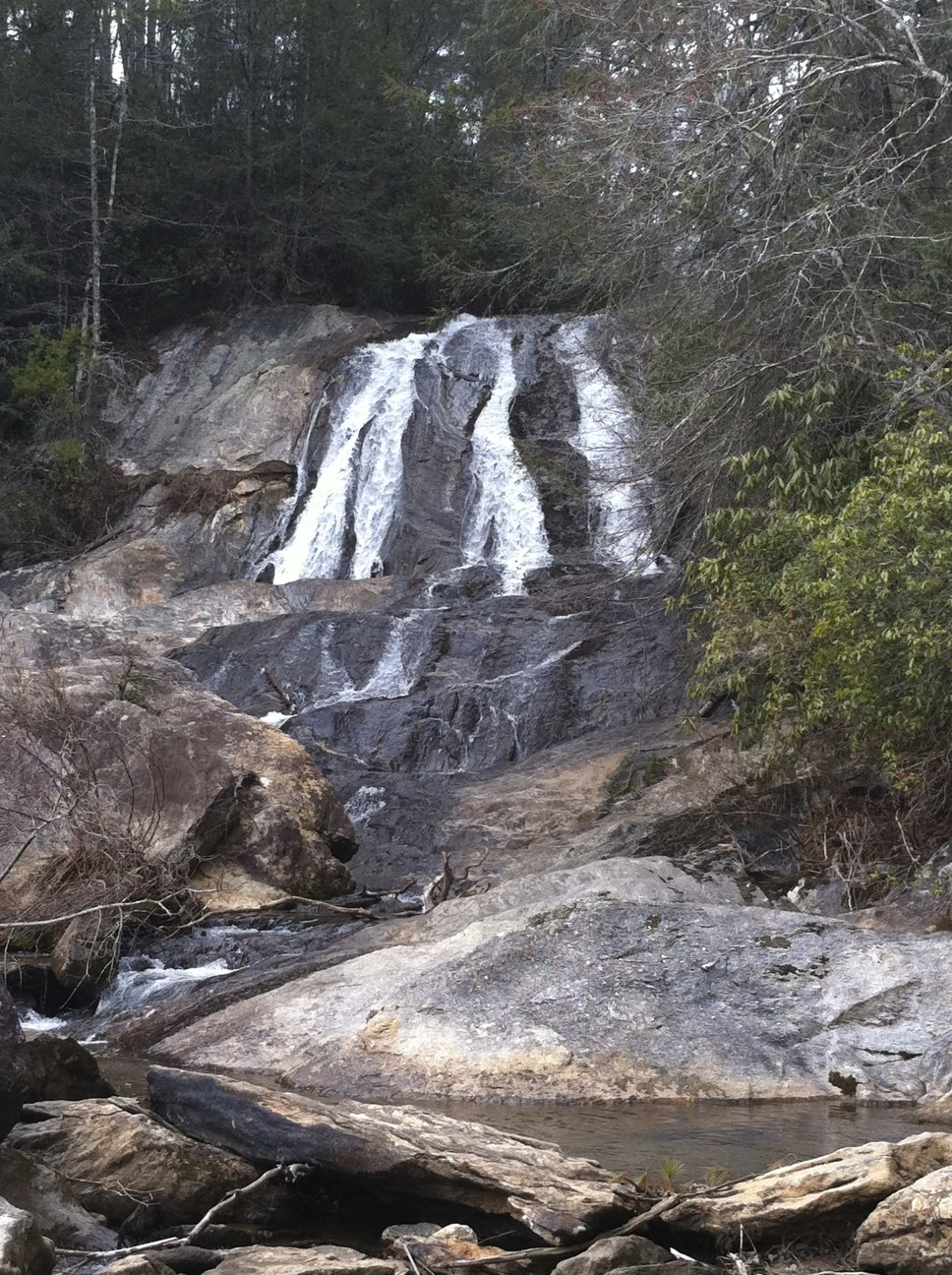
Dick's Creek Falls

== See also ==
- List of waterfalls
