= Tallulah Falls, Georgia =

- Town
- Location in Habersham County and the state of Georgia
- Coordinates: 34°43′35″N 83°22′57″W
- Country: United States
- State: Georgia
- Counties: Rabun, Habersham

Area
  - Total: 8.74 sq mi (22.63 km^{2})
  - Land: 8.26 sq mi (21.40 km^{2})
  - Water: 0.47 sq mi (1.23 km^{2})
- Elevation: 1,647 ft (502 m)

Population (2020)
  - Total: 199
  - Density: 24/sq mi (9.3/km^{2})
- Time zone: UTC-5 (Eastern (EST))
  - Summer (DST): UTC-4 (EDT)
- ZIP code: 30573
- Area code: 706
- FIPS code: 13-75328
- GNIS feature ID: 2406711
- Website: www.tallulahfallsga.gov

Tallulah Falls is a town in Habersham and Rabun counties in the U.S. state of Georgia near the Tallulah River. The population was 199 at the 2020 census.

== History ==
The Georgia General Assembly incorporated Tallulah Falls as a town in 1885. The community took its name from a nearby waterfall on the Tallulah River, which today is submerged beneath the waters of Tallulah Falls Lake.

== Geography ==
According to the United States Census Bureau, the town has a total area of 8.6 square miles (22.1 km^{2}), of which 8.1 square miles (21.1 km^{2}) is land and 0.4 square mile (1.0 km^{2}) (4.68%) is water. U.S. Highway 23-441, one of the principal thoroughfares into the Blue Ridge and Great Smoky Mountains, bisects the town.

== Demographics ==
Historical population
Census	Pop.	Note	%±
1890	149		—
1900	134		−10.1%
1910	87		−35.1%
1920	105		20.7%
1930	105		0.0%
1940	73		−30.5%
1950	239		227.4%
1960	225		−5.9%
1970	255		13.3%
1980	162		−36.5%
1990	147		−9.3%
2000	164		11.6%
2010	168		2.4%
2020	199		18.5%
U.S. Decennial Census

=== Racial and ethnic composition ===
Tallulah Falls town, Georgia – Racial and ethnic composition Note: the US Census treats Hispanic/Latino as an ethnic category. This table excludes Latinos from the racial categories and assigns them to a separate category. Hispanics/Latinos may be of any race.
Race / Ethnicity (NH = Non-Hispanic)	Pop 2000	Pop 2010	Pop 2020	% 2000	% 2010	% 2020
White alone (NH)	164	154	178	100.00%	91.67%	89.45%
Black or African American alone (NH)	0	0	0	0.00%	0.00%	0.00%
Native American or Alaska Native alone (NH)	0	1	0	0.00%	0.60%	0.00%
Asian alone (NH)	0	0	0	0.00%	0.00%	0.00%
Native Hawaiian or Pacific Islander alone (NH)	0	0	0	0.00%	0.00%	0.00%
Other race alone (NH)	0	0	0	0.00%	0.00%	0.00%
Mixed race or Multiracial (NH)	0	4	11	0.00%	2.38%	5.53%
Hispanic or Latino (any race)	0	9	10	0.00%	5.36%	5.03%
Total	164	168	199	100.00%	100.00%	100.00%

=== 2000 census ===
As of the census of 2000, there were 164 people, 71 households, and 47 families residing in the town. The population density was 20.1 people per square mile (7.8/km^{2}). There were 106 housing units at an average density of 13.0 per square mile (5.0/km^{2}). The racial makeup of the town was 100.00% White.

There were 71 households, out of which 35.2% had children under the age of 18 living with them, 62.0% were married couples living together, 5.6% had a female householder with no husband present, and 32.4% were non-families. 28.2% of all households were made up of individuals, and 9.9% had someone living alone who was 65 years of age or older. The average household size was 2.31 and the average family size was 2.83.

In the town, the population was spread out, with 22.6% under the age of 18, 7.3% from 18 to 24, 25.0% from 25 to 44, 31.1% from 45 to 64, and 14.0% who were 65 years of age or older. The median age was 42 years. For every 100 females, there were 100.0 males. For every 100 females age 18 and over, there were 95.4 males.

The median income for a household in the town was $40,833, and the median income for a family was $52,500. Males had a median income of $43,750 versus $25,000 for females. The per capita income for the town was $26,663. About 4.2% of families and 10.6% of the population were below the poverty line, including none of those under the age of eighteen and 34.4% of those 65 or over.

== In the media ==
Tallulah Falls was the filming location for portions of the 1972 film Deliverance.

Hollywood actress Tallulah Bankhead was named after her paternal grandmother, who in turn was named after Tallulah Falls.

== Notable people ==
- Ella Thomas Foreacre Brantley (1864–1948), President, Georgia Federation of Women's Clubs
