= Turniptown Mountain =

Mountain in Georgia, United States

Coordinates: 34.705°N 84.372°W

Turniptown Mountain is a summit in the U.S. state of Georgia. The elevation is 3,619 feet (1,103 m).

Turniptown Mountain took its name from a nearby indigenous settlement where tubers were harvested, an important food source to Native Americans.
