= Lake Seed =

Seed Lake
- Location within Georgia Location within the United States
- Location: Rabun County, Georgia
- Coordinates: 34°46′02″N 83°30′37″W
- Type: reservoir
- Primary inflows: Tallulah River
- Primary outflows: Tallulah River
- Basin countries: United States
- Surface area: 240 acres (97 ha)
- Surface elevation: 1,752.5 ft (534 m)

Seed Lake is a 240 acres (97 ha) reservoir with 13 miles (21 km) of shoreline located in Rabun County, in the northeastern corner of Georgia, United States. It is the second lake in a series of six lakes that follow the original riverbed of the Tallulah River. Each lake in the chain is created by hydroelectric dams operated by Georgia Power. Lake Seed is sandwiched between the northernmost lake in the series, Lake Burton, and Lake Rabun. Lake Rabun is followed by Lake Tallulah Falls, Lake Tugalo, and Lake Yonah. The reservoir elevation is listed as 1,765 feet (538 m) on topographic maps, but Georgia Power considers the lake full at an elevation of 1,752.5 feet (534.2 m).

Seed Lake was formed in 1927 with the completion of the Nacoochee Dam, a gravity concrete and masonry dam that is 75 feet (23 m) high and spans 490 feet (150 m). The associated Nacoochee Hydroelectric Plant has a capacity of 4,800 kilowatts. Nacoochee is derived from the Cherokee word that means "evening star."

== Sources ==
- Georgia Power Website
- North Georgia Lakes on About North Georgia
- TopoQuest Map of Lake Seed
- Georgia Power lake levels
