= Holcomb Creek Falls =

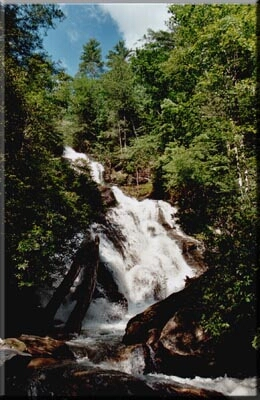
- Interactive map of Holcomb Creek Falls
- Location: Rabun County, Georgia, United States
- Coordinates: 34.981745°N 83.265357°W
- Type: Cascade
- Watercourse: Holcomb Creek

Holcomb Creek Falls is a waterfall located in the Chattooga River Ranger District of the Chattahoochee National Forest in Rabun County, Georgia, United States.

== See also ==
- List of waterfalls
