= Tallulah River =

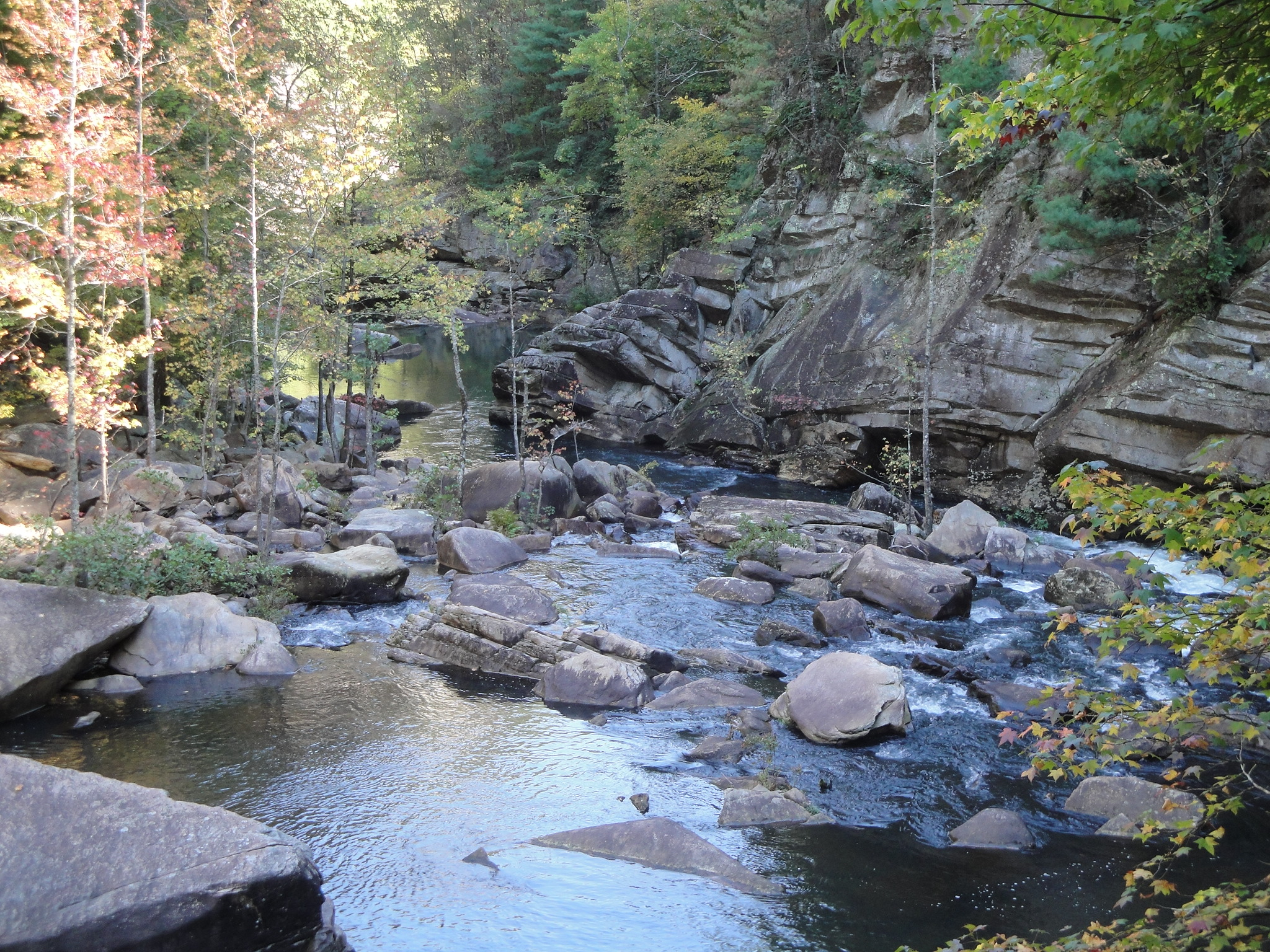
- Tallulah River at the bottom of the Tallulah Gorge

Location
- Country: United States
- States: North Carolina, Georgia

Physical characteristics
- Source: Southern Nantahala Wilderness
  - location: Otto, North Carolina
  - coordinates: 35°02′02″N 83°32′28″W
  - elevation: 1,437 m (4,715 ft)
- Mouth: Tugaloo River
  - location: Tallulah Falls, Georgia
  - coordinates: 34°43′01″N 83°21′11″W
  - elevation: 279 m (915 ft)
- Length: 47.7 mi (76.8 km)
- Basin size: 184 mi^{2} (480 km^{2})

Basin features
- Progression: Tugaloo River → Savannah River → Atlantic Ocean
- River system: Savannah River

The Tallulah River (/təˈluːlə/ tə-LOO-lə) is a 47.7-mile-long (76.8 km) river in Georgia and North Carolina. It begins in Clay County, North Carolina, near Standing Indian Mountain in the Southern Nantahala Wilderness and flows south into Georgia, crossing the state line into Towns County. The river travels through Rabun County and ends in Habersham County. It cuts through the Tallulah Dome rock formation to form the Tallulah Gorge and its several waterfalls (collectively known as Tallulah Falls). The Tallulah River intersects with the Chattooga River to form the Tugaloo River at Lake Tugalo in Habersham County. It joins South Carolina's Seneca River at Lake Hartwell (also created by a dam upriver) to form the Savannah River, which flows southeastward into the Atlantic Ocean.

== Description ==
From its headwaters to its confluence with the Tugaloo River, the Tallulah River is approximately 48 miles (77 km) long. The Tallulah River Basin drains approximately 184 square miles (480 km^{2}), as measured at the Tallulah Falls Hydroelectric Plant in Habersham County, Georgia, near the lower end of the Tallulah Gorge.

The lower part of the river includes a string of man-made lakes along the river created by hydroelectric dams operated by Georgia Power. The first (and northernmost) lake in the series is Lake Burton, which is followed by Lake Seed, Lake Rabun, and Lake Tallulah Falls. From Tallulah Falls Lake, the lower part of the river flows through the Tallulah Gorge and now ends as an arm of Lake Tugalo, the other arm of the lake being formed by the Chattooga River. Starting at a point about 0.5 miles (0.80 km) downstream from the dam for Tallulah Falls Lake, the boundary line between Habersham and Rabun counties follows the course of the Tallulah River to its end.

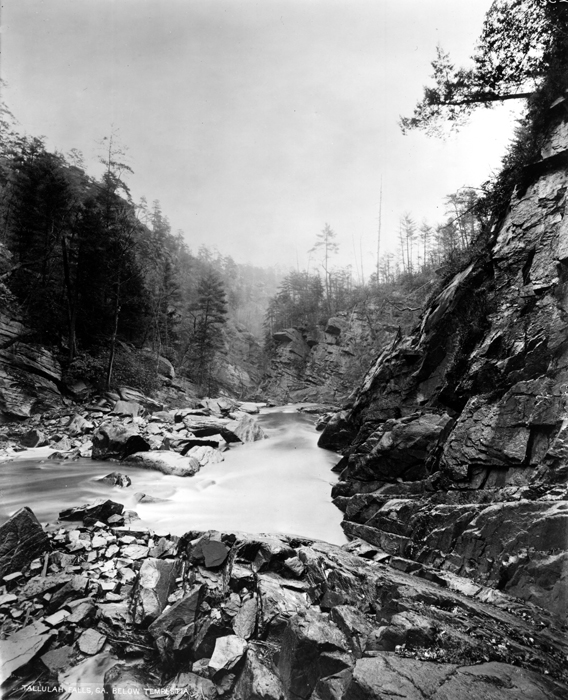
The Tallulah River, circa 1894

The upper Tallulah River Basin drains to the portion of the Tallulah River that is upstream from Lake Burton. This includes northwestern Rabun County, northeastern Towns County and part of Clay County, North Carolina. The United States Geological Survey collects data for the upper Tallulah River Basin from its gauging station at the point where the river crosses Plum Orchard Road. The upper Tallulah River Basin includes a section of the river that is about 14.3 miles (23 km) long, draining a 56.5 square mile (146 km^{2}) area. Annually, the area receives at least 72 inches of rainfall and is entirely within the boundaries of the Chattahoochee National Forest. About one-third of the land falls within the Southern Nantahala Wilderness and about one-fifth is privately owned. The primary tributaries of the Tallulah River in Rabun County are Coleman River and Persimmon Creek.

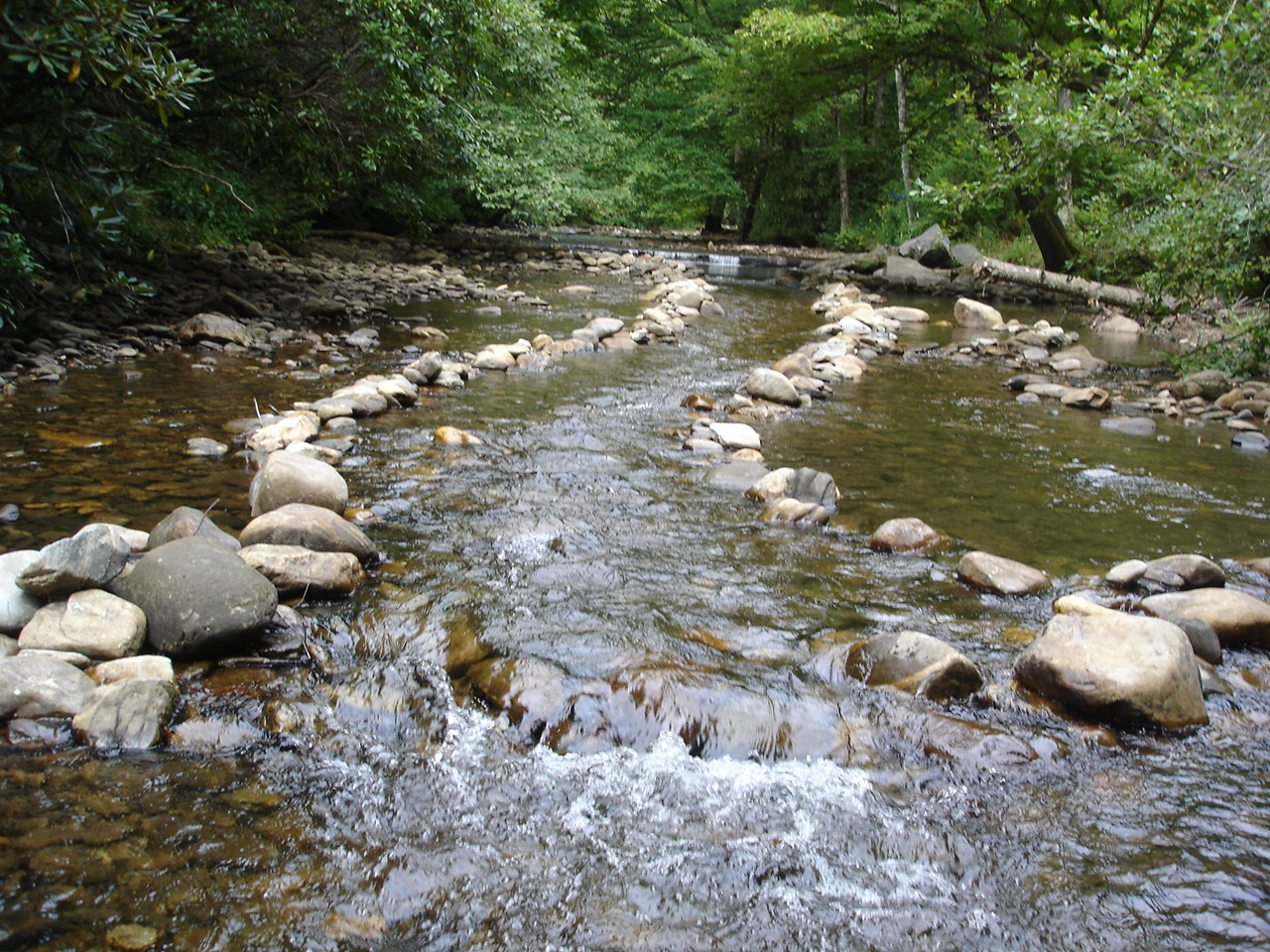
Tate Branch is a branch of the Tallulah River located near Forest Service Road 70 near Clayton, Georgia.

The upper Tallulah River Basin is as scenic as it is rugged. The highest elevations are found in North Carolina on Standing Indian Mountain, elevation 5,499 feet, where the Tallulah River headwaters are located. After coming into Georgia and passing through the old mining and logging town of Tate City, Georgia in eastern Towns County, the river enters into what is known as Tallulah’s upper gorge, or the Rock Mountain Gorge. This upper "gorge" is far less dramatic that the more famous Tallulah Gorge. It starts just upstream from the river’s confluence with Coleman River and runs nearly 3 miles (5 km) past Rock Mountain on the western side of the river. The scenic "gorge" is accessible via a drive along the Tallulah River Road (Forest Service Road 70). The Tallulah River Road follows an old railroad bed before ending in the Southern Nantahala Wilderness and provides the only access to Tate City, Georgia. Heavily wooded today, the upper Tallulah River Basin was stripped nearly bare by clear-cut logging in the 1930s before the Chattahoochee National Forest was established.

== Etymology of name ==
Although Georgians have long assumed that Tallulah was a Cherokee language word, given the prominence of Cherokee history in the state, scholars dispute the derivation of the river's name. This area was long part of the extensive Cherokee homelands in the Southeast. Tourism promoters in the late 19th century said that tallulah meant "thundering waters" in Cherokee. Some scholars later theorized that tallulah meant “terrible” in Cherokee, or was possibly derived from a number of other words. It is more likely that there is no translation for the word.

Based on archeological studies, the Cherokee appear to have settled some of their homeland by the mid to late-16th century; for instance, they had built a townhouse by the late sixteenth century at the Coweeta Creek site on the upper Little Tennessee River in present-day North Carolina.

The Overhill Cherokee also used the term, and were known to have a town called Tallulah, located on the portion of the Little Tennessee that flowed on the west side of the Appalachian Mountains. Muscogee Creek also occupied part of this area before being pushed out by the Cherokee.
