= Lake Rabun =

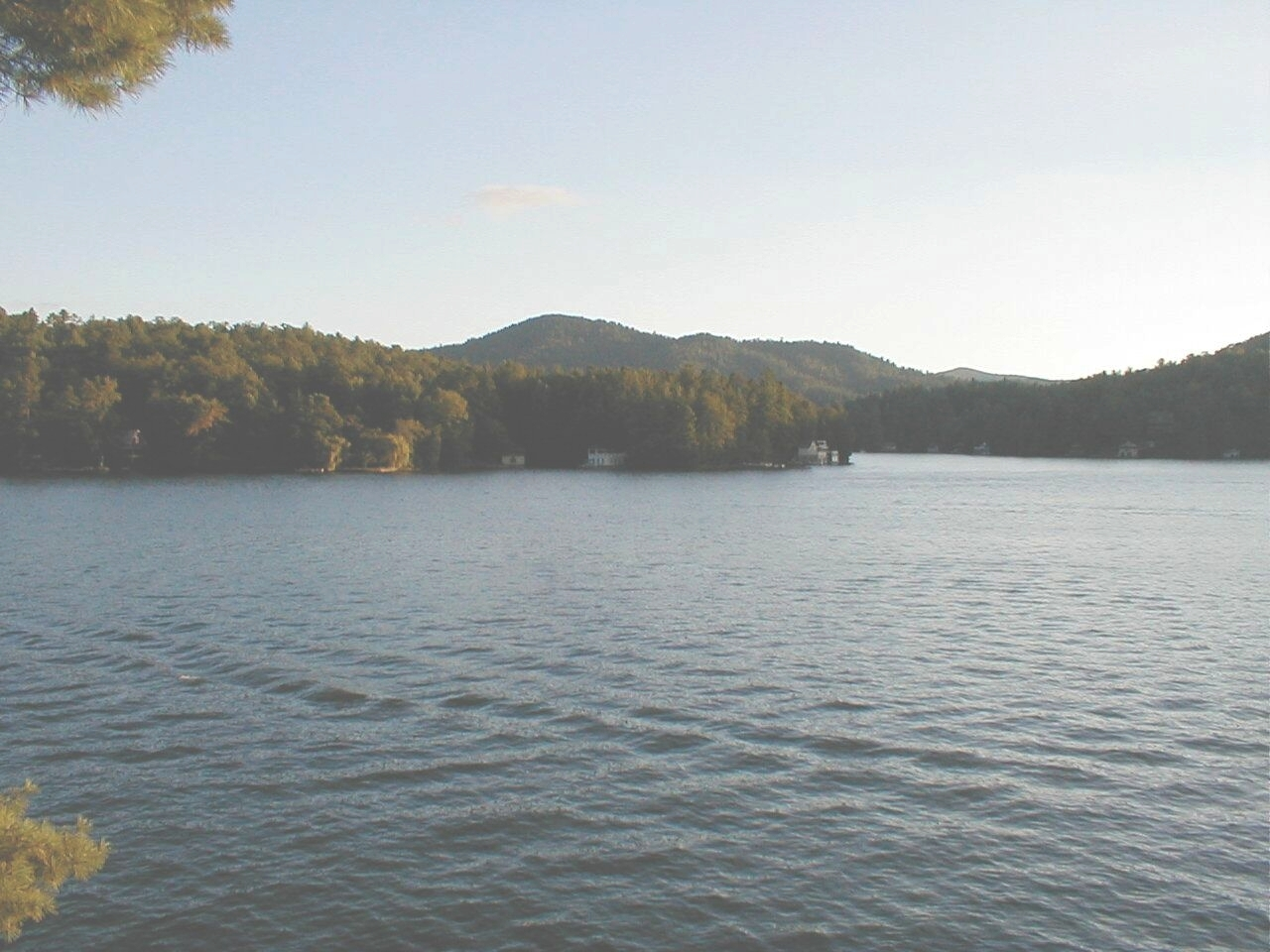

- Location within Georgia Location within the United States
- Location: Rabun County, Georgia
- Coordinates: 34°45′55″N 083°24′57″W
- Type: reservoir
- Primary inflows: Tallulah River
- Primary outflows: Tallulah River
- Basin countries: United States
- Surface area: 835 acres (3.38 km^{2})
- Surface elevation: 1,690 ft (515 m)

Lake Rabun is a twisty 835-acre (3.4 km^{2}) reservoir with 25 miles (40 km) of shoreline located in the Northeastern corner of the U.S. state of Georgia in Rabun County. It is the third lake in a six-lake series that follows the original course of the Tallulah River. The series begins with Lake Burton as the northernmost lake, followed by Lake Seed, Lake Rabun, Lake Tallulah Falls, Lake Tugalo, and Lake Yonah. Lake Rabun was built in a deep valley located along a 10-mile (16 km) section of the Tallulah River.

The lakes are owned and operated by the Georgia Power Company to generate hydroelectric energy for Georgia's largest city, Atlanta. At one time these lakes were the largest producers of electricity in the state of Georgia. Now, they only provide peak power supply.

== History ==
Lake Rabun's Mathis Dam was completed in May 1915, but the lake was not filled for ten years waiting for the completion of a tunnel from near the dam to the power generator at Tallulah Falls. It then created a reservoir of over ten million gallons covering 834 acres (3.4 km^{2}) with a normal water level of 1,690 feet (515 m) above mean sea level. The property was purchased by the Georgia Railway and Power Company (later renamed Georgia Power Company). The Mathis Dam is an ambursen-type concrete dam with a height of 108 feet (33 m) and a span of 660 feet (201 m). The Terrora Hydroelectric Plant at Mathis Dam has a generation capacity of 16,000 kilowatts. The reservoir elevation is listed as 1,683 feet on topographic maps, but Georgia Power considers the lake full at an elevation of 1,689.6 feet (515.0 m).

== Fourth of July traditions ==
The Lake Rabun Association (LRA) sponsors and coordinates Lake Rabun's Fourth of July celebration. Each year, a wooden boat parade follows the shore lines of the lake. Prizes are given to the most decorated boat and boat house. Another tradition is the Rabun Ramble Road Race, a 5K & 10K, that winds along the shores of the north side of the lake. The race is a marathon qualifier with over 800 participants each year to raise funds for the Lake Rabun Foundation. In the evening fireworks are visible over the lake from hundreds of boats along its lower basin.

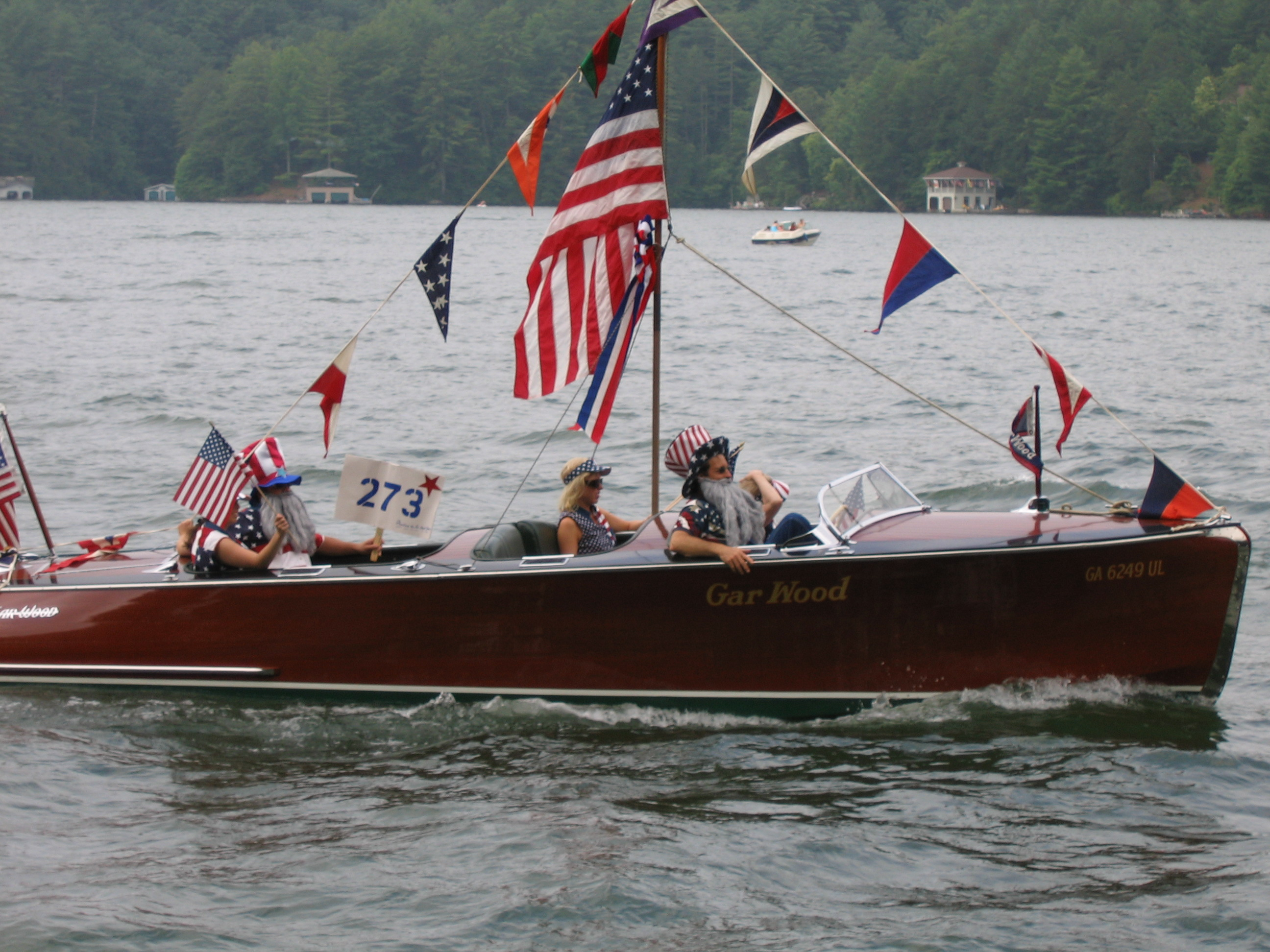
Fourth of July Wooden Boat Parade

== Tour of homes ==
Every other year, the LRA conducts a tour of homes that is open to the public. The tour raises money for local scholarships. The LRA sells up to 600 tickets with the tour starting at the historic Hall's Boathouse Marina.

== Lake homes ==
Due to the large growth of Atlanta in recent years, Lake Rabun has become a second home to some of the most wealthy and politically connected individuals in the state of Georgia. Although Lake Rabun has experienced a housing boom due to leased lots by the Georgia Power Company, most home owners are summer weekend residents.
