= Lake Yonah =

- Location within Georgia Location within the United States
- Location: Georgia / South Carolina
- Coordinates: 34°40′54″N 083°20′31″W
- Type: reservoir
- Primary inflows: Tugaloo River,
- Primary outflows: Tugaloo River
- Basin countries: United States
- Surface area: 325 acres (1.32 km^{2})
- Surface elevation: 744 ft (227 m)

Lake Yonah is a lake on the Tugaloo River, separating Georgia and South Carolina.

The lake is created by the Yonah Dam, which is owned and operated by Georgia Power, and generates 22 megawatts. Lake Yonah is a residential lake with 72 vacation and permanent homes. After the Tugaloo River flows from Yonah through the lower dam, it continues to Lake Hartwell, and joins the Savannah River, which empties into the Atlantic Ocean. Another tributary to this river is the Seneca River, which flows into it from South Carolina. Lake Yonah is also a source of fresh water for the town of Toccoa, which is approximately 11 miles (18 km) away.

== See also ==
- List of lakes in South Carolina
