= Mountain City, Georgia =

- Town
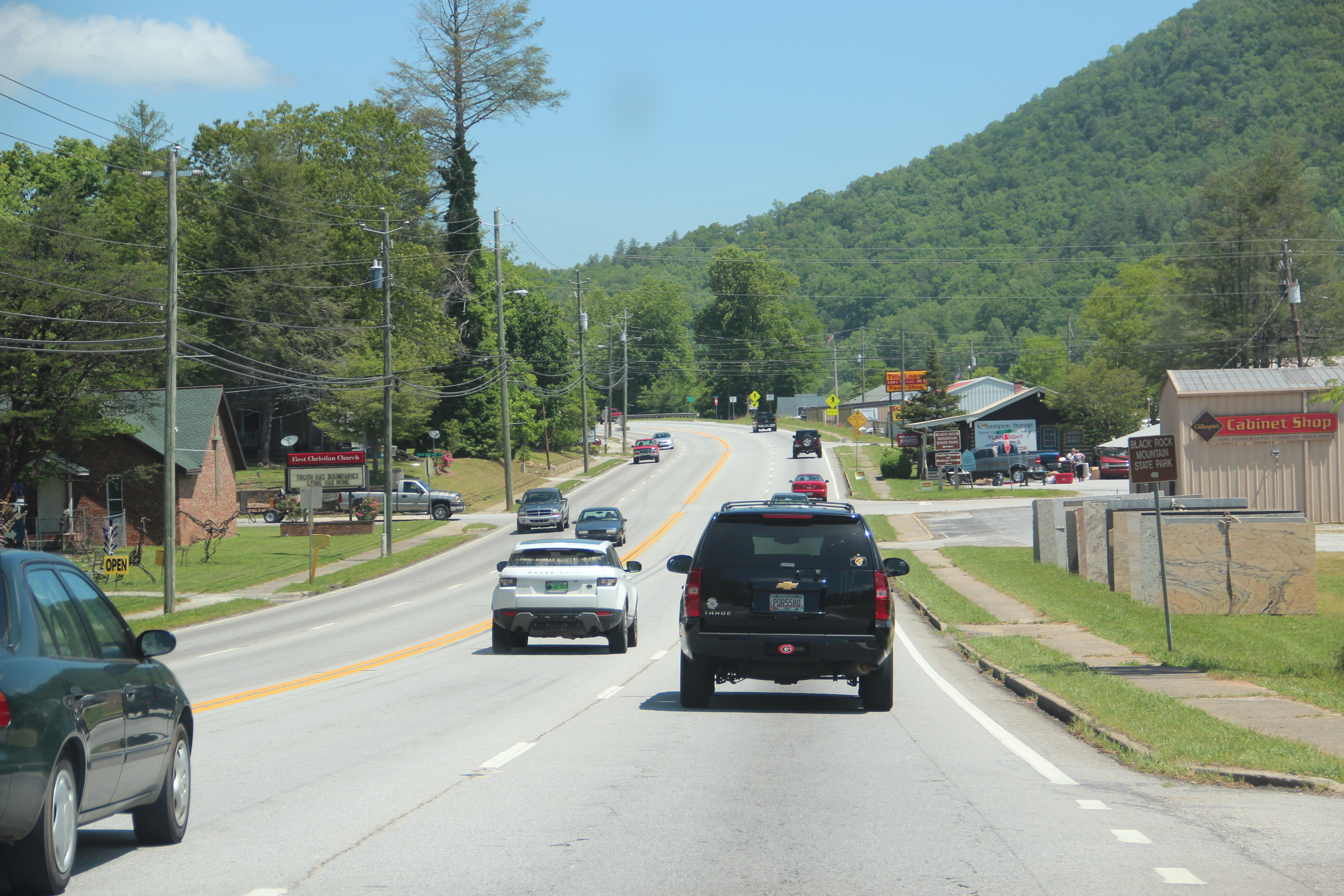
- U.S. Route 23 in Mountain City

- Location in Rabun County and the state of Georgia
- Coordinates: 34°55′11″N 83°23′07″W
- Country: United States
- State: Georgia
- County: Rabun

Area
  - Total: 1.82 sq mi (4.72 km^{2})
  - Land: 1.81 sq mi (4.70 km^{2})
  - Water: 0.0077 sq mi (0.02 km^{2})
- Elevation: 2,169 ft (661 m)

Population (2020)
  - Total: 904
  - Density: 497.8/sq mi (192.21/km^{2})
- Time zone: UTC-5 (Eastern (EST))
  - Summer (DST): UTC-4 (EDT)
- ZIP code: 30562
- Area code: 706
- FIPS code: 13-53116
- GNIS feature ID: 2406216

Mountain City is an incorporated town in Rabun County, Georgia, United States. The population was 904 at the 2020 census. The town straddles the Eastern Continental Divide in a deep gap in the Blue Ridge Mountain front. The gap allows U.S. Route 441 to cross the range at an elevation of 2168 feet without the significant grade required by roadways at most other mountain passes along the Georgia Blue Ridge.

== History ==
The Georgia General Assembly incorporated Mountain City as a town in 1907. The town was so named on account of its lofty elevation.

In 1974, the Foxfire Museum and Heritage Center opened on Black Rock Mountain in Mountain City. The museum of Appalachian culture includes many log structures from the 1800s including historic cabins and a functional blacksmith shop. The 100-acre campus also includes the Foxfire headquarters, known for producing the Foxfire magazine and book series.

== Geography ==
According to the United States Census Bureau, the town has a total area of 1.8 square miles (4.6 km^{2}), of which 1.8 square miles (4.6 km^{2}) is land and 0.56% is water.

=== Climate ===
Mountain City has Oceanic characteristics due to its high elevation.

Climate data for Mountain City, Georgia (1991–2020 normals, extremes 2002–present)
Month	Jan	Feb	Mar	Apr	May	Jun	Jul	Aug	Sep	Oct	Nov	Dec	Year
Record high °F (°C)	68 (20)	73 (23)	81 (27)	82 (28)	82 (28)	92 (33)	90 (32)	88 (31)	86 (30)	83 (28)	80 (27)	73 (23)	92 (33)
Mean daily maximum °F (°C)	45.4 (7.4)	48.7 (9.3)	55.4 (13.0)	63.9 (17.7)	69.3 (20.7)	74.4 (23.6)	76.9 (24.9)	76.3 (24.6)	72.2 (22.3)	65.1 (18.4)	57.0 (13.9)	48.6 (9.2)	62.8 (17.1)
Daily mean °F (°C)	35.7 (2.1)	38.8 (3.8)	44.9 (7.2)	53.1 (11.7)	59.9 (15.5)	66.4 (19.1)	69.1 (20.6)	68.1 (20.1)	63.5 (17.5)	54.9 (12.7)	46.7 (8.2)	39.1 (3.9)	53.4 (11.9)
Mean daily minimum °F (°C)	26.1 (−3.3)	28.9 (−1.7)	34.3 (1.3)	42.4 (5.8)	50.4 (10.2)	58.5 (14.7)	61.3 (16.3)	59.9 (15.5)	54.7 (12.6)	44.7 (7.1)	36.4 (2.4)	29.5 (−1.4)	43.9 (6.6)
Record low °F (°C)	−1 (−18)	−2 (−19)	10 (−12)	16 (−9)	33 (1)	42 (6)	51 (11)	50 (10)	39 (4)	25 (−4)	11 (−12)	4 (−16)	−2 (−19)
Average precipitation inches (mm)	6.21 (158)	5.75 (146)	6.37 (162)	5.47 (139)	5.32 (135)	5.96 (151)	5.58 (142)	5.97 (152)	5.84 (148)	5.18 (132)	5.79 (147)	7.08 (180)	70.52 (1,791)
Source: NOAA

== Demographics ==
Historical population
Census	Pop.	Note	%±
1910	158		—
1920	210		32.9%
1930	354		68.6%
1940	524		48.0%
1950	524		0.0%
1960	550		5.0%
1970	594		8.0%
1980	701		18.0%
1990	784		11.8%
2000	829		5.7%
2010	1,088		31.2%
2020	904		−16.9%
U.S. Decennial Census

As of the census of 2000, there were 829 people, 363 households, and 238 families residing in the town. The population density was 464.1 inhabitants per square mile (179.2/km^{2}). There were 462 housing units at an average density of 258.6 per square mile (99.8/km^{2}). The racial makeup of the town was 90.83% White, 0.60% African American, 0.97% Native American, 0.12% Asian, 4.46% from other races, and 3.02% from two or more races. Hispanic or Latino of any race were 7.60% of the population.

There were 363 households, out of which 27.5% had children under the age of 18 living with them, 48.2% were married couples living together, 13.2% had a female householder with no husband present, and 34.4% were non-families. 29.5% of all households were made up of individuals, and 11.6% had someone living alone who was 65 years of age or older. The average household size was 2.28 and the average family size was 2.81.

In the town, the population was spread out, with 24.5% under the age of 18, 6.2% from 18 to 24, 26.2% from 25 to 44, 25.8% from 45 to 64, and 17.4% who were 65 years of age or older. The median age was 40 years. For every 100 females, there were 88.8 males. For every 100 females age 18 and over, there were 85.8 males.

The median income for a household in the town was $24,531, and the median income for a family was $35,060. Males had a median income of $23,571 versus $23,182 for females. The per capita income for the town was $15,235. About 16.1% of families and 18.1% of the population were below the poverty line, including 25.8% of those under age 18 and 20.9% of those age 65 or over.
