= Rabun County, Georgia =

County in Georgia, United States

- County
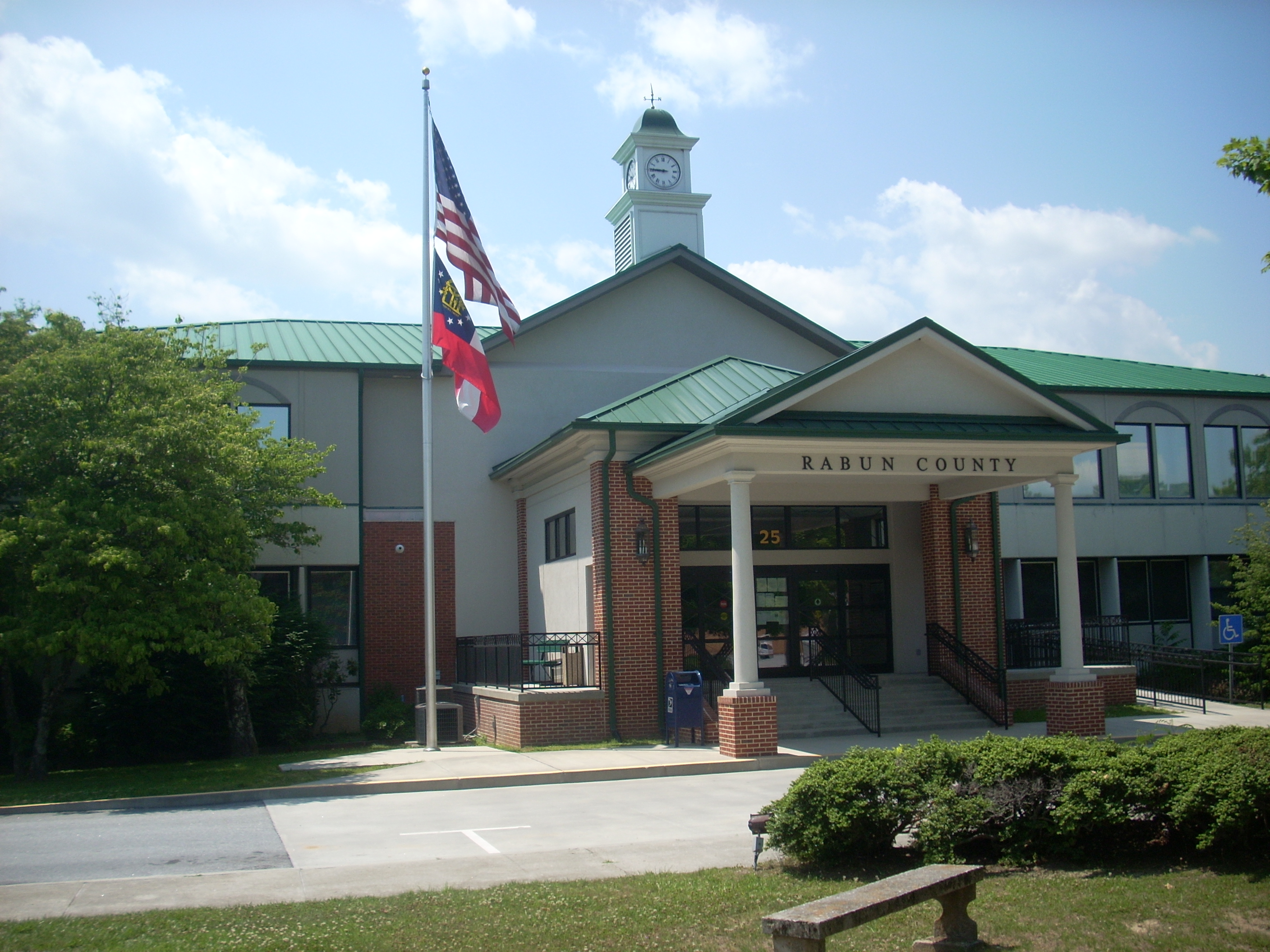
- Rabun County courthouse in Clayton

- Seal

- Location within the U.S. state of Georgia
- Coordinates: 34.87692°N 83.40820°W
- Country: United States
- State: Georgia
- Founded: 1819; 207 years ago
- Named for: William Rabun
- Seat: Clayton
- Largest city: Clayton

Area
  - Total: 377 sq mi (980 km^{2})
  - Land: 370 sq mi (960 km^{2})
  - Water: 6.9 sq mi (18 km^{2}) 1.8%

Population (2020)
  - Total: 16,883
  - Estimate (2025): 17,764 ▲
  - Density: 46/sq mi (18/km^{2})
- Time zone: UTC−5 (Eastern)
  - Summer (DST): UTC−4 (EDT)
- Congressional district: 9th
- Website: rabuncounty.ga.gov

Rabun County (/ˈreɪbən/) is the northeasternmost county in the U.S. state of Georgia. As of the 2020 census, the population was 16,883, up from 16,276 in 2010. The county seat is Clayton. With an average annual rainfall of over 70 inches (1,800 mm), Rabun County has the title of the rainiest county in Georgia and is one of the rainiest counties east of the Cascades. The year 2018 was the wettest on record in the county's history. The National Weather Service cooperative observation station in northwest Rabun's Germany Valley measured 116.48 inches of rain during the year. During 2020, the Germany Valley NWS station reported a yearly precipitation total of 100.19 inches.

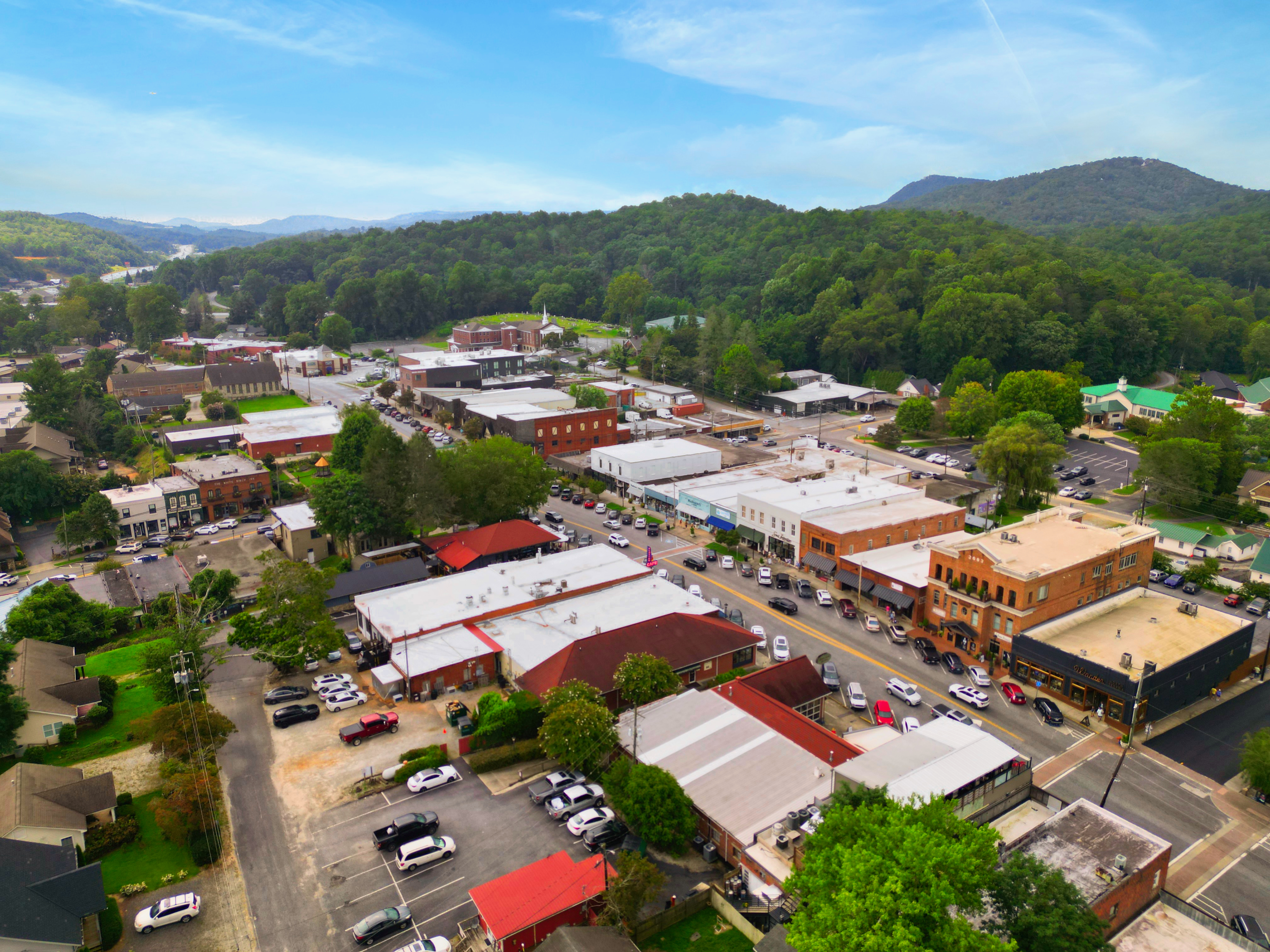
Aerial of downtown Clayton, the county seat

== History ==
As early as 1760 explorers came to the area now known as Rabun County. In the 18th century the population of Cherokee in the area was so heavy that this portion of the Appalachian Mountains was sometimes called the "Cherokee Mountains." The early explorers and settlers divided the Cherokee people into three divisions depending on location and dialect, the Lower, Middle, and Over-the-Hill. At least four Cherokee settlements once were in what would later become Rabun County. A Middle settlement called Stikayi (Stiyaki, Sticoa, Stekoa) was located on Stekoa Creek, probably southeast of the present-day Clayton. An Over-the-Hill settlement called Tallulah was located on the upper portion of the Tallulah River. Another two Cherokee settlements of unknown division also existed: Chicherohe (Chechero), which was destroyed during the American Revolutionary War, located along Warwoman Creek, east of Clayton, and Eastertoy (Eastatowth, Estatowee) which was located near the present-day Dillard.

Despite the prominence of the Cherokee, evidence exists that other Native Americans were in the region before them. A mound similar to others across North Georgia (including the famous Etowah Indian Mounds) is located about one mile (1.6 km) east of Dillard, Georgia and is likely a remnant of an earlier mound-building Native American culture known as the Mississippian culture. The mound location is listed on the National Register of Historic Places as the Hoojah Branch Site.

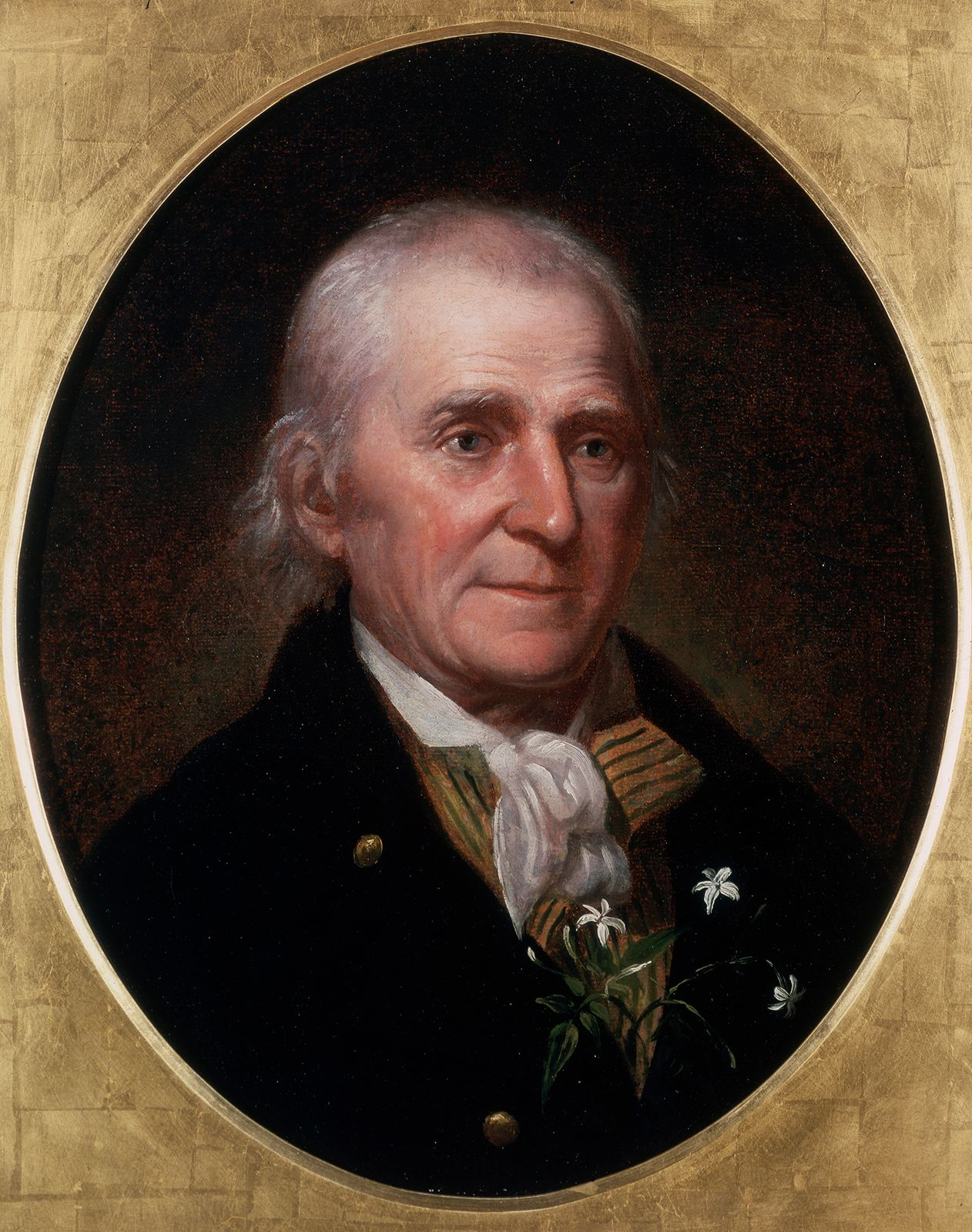
Portrait of William Bartram by Peale

Explorer and naturalist William Bartram was one of the early visitors to Rabun County. According to his journal entries for May 1775, Bartram crossed the Chattooga River into Georgia near its confluence with Warwoman Creek. He later went through a junction of Cherokee trails called Dividings (which would later become Clayton), and then traveled north to an area called Passover (which would later become Mountain City). During his visit to the area, he also climbed Rabun Bald. His travels in Rabun County are memorialized today by the Georgia portion of the hiking trail known as the Bartram Trail.

John Dillard and his family were among the first documented settlers in the area in 1794 as a result of a land grant for his service in the American Revolution. The settlers were initially tolerated, but tensions increased as displaced Cherokees moved in from other areas. Eventually, the white settlers were viewed as invaders who did not respect nature and killed the game and, as a result, raids between the clashing cultures became commonplace. For the most part, the hostilities ended a few years before the Cherokee ceded the land to Georgia in 1817.

The Georgia General Assembly passed an act to create the county on December 21, 1819, becoming Georgia's forty-seventh county. The northern border of the county was established as latitude 35°N, which is the boundary between Georgia and North Carolina. Due to irregularities in an early survey mission, the Georgia-North Carolina border at Rabun County's northeast corner was erroneously set several hundred yards north of the 35th parallel, giving this location at Ellicott's Rock the distinction of being the State of Georgia's northernmost point. The county is named for William Rabun, who served as the 11th Governor of Georgia from his election in 1817 until his death in 1819. In 1828, the Georgia General Assembly transferred a portion of Habersham County to Rabun County. In 1838, the legislature redefined the Rabun-Habersham county line. In 1856, the legislature used portions of Rabun and Union Counties to create Towns County.

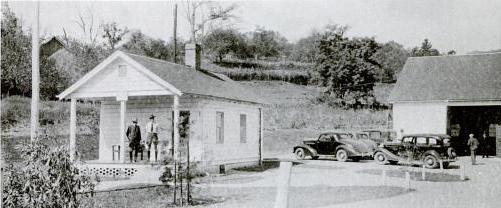
Tallulah Ranger Station near Clayton in 1935

During the U.S. Civil War, Rabun County was one of only five Georgia counties that did not declare secession from the Union. Although the county was largely untouched by the Civil War, the area did border on anarchy during that time. The county was described by some as being "almost a unit against secession." One of the county's residents recalled in 1865 that "You cannot find a people who were more averse to secession than were the people of our county." He stated that "I canvassed the county in 1860–61 myself and I know that there were not exceeding twenty men in this county who were in favor of secession." Despite its overall loyalty to the Union, Rabun County did field two regiments for the Confederate cause: Rabun 24th Regiment, Georgia Infantry, Company E, Rabun Gap Riflemen; and Rabun 52nd Regiment, Georgia Infantry, Company F, Beauregard Braves.

In 1898 the Tallulah Falls Railway was constructed on a north–south track through the county. One of the most popular stops along the railway was Tallulah Gorge. The Railway was in operation for more than 60 years and was featured in the Disney movie, The Great Locomotive Chase.

Starting in the 1920s, many of the improvements in the county can be attributed to the establishment, growth and expansion of the Chattahoochee National Forest in the county. One of the key figures in the establishment and growth of the Chattahoochee National Forest was "Ranger Nick" Nicholson, Georgia's first forest ranger. Among other things, Ranger Nick was responsible for arranging for telephone lines to be run from Clayton, Georgia to the Pine Mountain community in the eastern part of the county.

Deliverance (1972), a highly popular film about a group of city men taking a canoe trip in north Georgia, was filmed largely in Rabun County. After the film's release, Rabun County experienced an increase in tourism, with the number of visitors going from hundred to tens of thousands. By 2012, 40 years later, tourism was the largest source of revenue in the county. According to the US Census, the population has doubled since 1970.

By 2012 rafting had developed as a $20 million industry in the region.

Because of the scenery, people with money have built vacation and second homes around the area's lakes. In June 2012 Rabun County held a Chattooga River Festival to encourage preservation of the river and its environment. It also noted the 40th anniversary of the filming of Deliverance in the area, an aspect which aroused controversy in planning for the festival.

== Law and Government ==
The county is governed by a five-member Board of Commissioners. In addition to the Rabun County Sheriff's Office, the towns of Clayton, Mountain City, Dillard, Sky Valley, and Tallulah Falls all have their own police departments.

Rabun County is protected by a volunteer fire department made up of 12 stations, 14 engines, 11 tankers, three boats, and 250 volunteers. Two of the stations (Scaly Mountain/Sky Valley and Tallulah Falls) are separate organizations from Rabun County Fire Services. The county also has an EMS station which is completely volunteer, which provides emergency technical rescue services which include wilderness and urban search and rescue, technical rope rescue, swift-water rescue, confined space rescue, and dive rescue.

== Politics ==
As of the 2020s, Rabun County is a strongly Republican voting county, voting 78% for Donald Trump in 2024. For elections to the United States House of Representatives, Rabun County is part of Georgia's 9th congressional district, currently represented by Andrew Clyde. For elections to the Georgia State Senate, Rabun County is part of District 51. For elections to the Georgia House of Representatives, Rabun County is part of District 10.

United States presidential election results for Rabun County, Georgia
Year	Republican		Democratic		Third party(ies)	
Year	No.	%	No.	%	No.	%
1880	2	0.37%	532	99.63%	0	0.00%
1884	5	2.14%	229	97.86%	0	0.00%
1888	43	9.82%	386	88.13%	9	2.05%
1892	81	15.14%	448	83.74%	6	1.12%
1896	101	19.54%	404	78.14%	12	2.32%
1900	70	22.22%	244	77.46%	1	0.32%
1904	121	24.74%	364	74.44%	4	0.82%
1908	171	41.01%	233	55.88%	13	3.12%
1912	16	3.50%	323	70.68%	118	25.82%
1916	87	9.66%	633	70.26%	181	20.09%
1920	147	32.03%	312	67.97%	0	0.00%
1924	117	19.73%	454	76.56%	22	3.71%
1928	306	34.15%	590	65.85%	0	0.00%
1932	78	7.97%	893	91.22%	8	0.82%
1936	162	14.58%	948	85.33%	1	0.09%
1940	82	7.86%	958	91.85%	3	0.29%
1944	185	12.92%	1,247	87.08%	0	0.00%
1948	165	17.03%	747	77.09%	57	5.88%
1952	449	25.38%	1,320	74.62%	0	0.00%
1956	413	22.89%	1,391	77.11%	0	0.00%
1960	464	23.02%	1,552	76.98%	0	0.00%
1964	551	23.48%	1,796	76.52%	0	0.00%
1968	680	25.38%	592	22.10%	1,407	52.52%
1972	1,477	80.14%	366	19.86%	0	0.00%
1976	591	19.77%	2,398	80.23%	0	0.00%
1980	1,070	30.62%	2,327	66.58%	98	2.80%
1984	2,191	63.36%	1,267	36.64%	0	0.00%
1988	2,278	63.14%	1,301	36.06%	29	0.80%
1992	1,902	41.15%	1,878	40.63%	842	18.22%
1996	2,213	46.42%	1,943	40.76%	611	12.82%
2000	3,451	64.61%	1,776	33.25%	114	2.13%
2004	4,650	70.00%	1,918	28.87%	75	1.13%
2008	5,487	71.89%	2,001	26.22%	145	1.90%
2012	5,754	77.08%	1,559	20.88%	152	2.04%
2016	6,287	78.12%	1,444	17.94%	317	3.94%
2020	7,474	78.07%	1,984	20.72%	116	1.21%
2024	8,151	78.20%	2,222	21.32%	50	0.48%

United States Senate election results for Rabun County, Georgia2
Year	Republican		Democratic		Third party(ies)	
Year	No.	%	No.	%	No.	%
2020	7,392	78.04%	1,825	19.27%	255	2.69%
2020	6,618	78.72%	1,789	21.28%	0	0.00%

United States Senate election results for Rabun County, Georgia3
Year	Republican		Democratic		Third party(ies)	
Year	No.	%	No.	%	No.	%
2020	4,576	48.75%	1,223	13.03%	3,587	38.22%
2020	7,474	79.02%	1,984	20.98%	0	0.00%
2022	6,180	75.30%	1,804	21.98%	223	2.72%
2022	5,742	77.09%	1,706	22.91%	0	0.00%

Georgia Gubernatorial election results for Rabun County
Year	Republican		Democratic		Third party(ies)	
Year	No.	%	No.	%	No.	%
2022	6,766	81.89%	1,415	17.13%	81	0.98%

== Geography ==
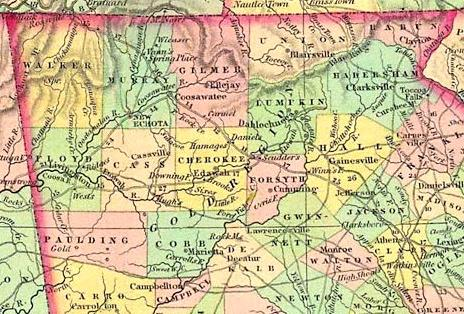
1834 map showing Rabun County

According to the U.S. Census Bureau, the county has a total area of 377 square miles (980 km^{2}), of which 370 square miles (960 km^{2}) is land and 6.9 square miles (18 km^{2}) (1.8%) is water. Approximately, 60% of the land is in National Forest and State Parks, approximately 20% is held by Georgia Power and the rest is in private hands. With 148,684 acres (601.70 km^{2}) of the Chattahoochee National Forest, a national protected area, located within its boundaries, Rabun County hosts the largest portion of the Chattahoochee National Forest of any of the 18 counties with land included in the Forest. Most of Rabun County is located in the Tugaloo River sub-basin in the larger Savannah River basin, with a northern portion of the county located in the Upper Little Tennessee sub-basin in the Upper Tennessee River basin.

=== Features ===
The county's three major lakes were created in the early 20th century by Georgia Power for hydroelectric power generation. The three lakes today provide recreation as well as power generation: Lake Burton covers 11.23 square kilometres (2,770 acres) or 4.33 sq mi and has 100 kilometres (62 mi) of shoreline, Lake Rabun covers 3.38 square kilometres (840 acres) and has 40 kilometres (25 mi) of shoreline, and Lake Seed covers 0.97 square kilometres (240 acres) and has 21 kilometres (13 mi) of shoreline. The county also boasts a large number of trout streams, including the Tallulah River and its tributaries, Coleman River and Charlies Creek.

The Eastern Continental Divide runs through the county, roughly from southwest to northeast, also representing a portion of the Tennessee Valley Divide. The county's eastern border with South Carolina is formed by the Chattooga River, the largest tributary of the Tugaloo River and then Savannah River (which forms the rest of the border of the two states). The north-central portion of Rabun County is in the watershed of the Little Tennessee River, which flows northward from Mountain City. The high elevation along the divide gives Rabun County the most snow of any in county in Georgia. This also gives it mild weather throughout the warmer months of the year, leading to the county's slogan, Where Spring Spends the Summer. Rabun County is the only county in Georgia with three state parks: Black Rock Mountain, Moccasin Creek, and Tallulah Gorge.

==== Mountains ====
Mountains dominate the topography of Rabun County. The Eastern Continental Divide provides Rabun County with the second and third highest peaks in Georgia: Rabun Bald at 4,696 feet (1,431 m) and Dick's Knob at 4,620 feet (1,410 m). The county has eight peaks that are higher than 4,000 feet (1,200 m) and over 60 peaks that are between 3,000 and 4,000 feet (1,200 m).

*For more information, see: List of Summits and Ridges in Rabun County, Georgia

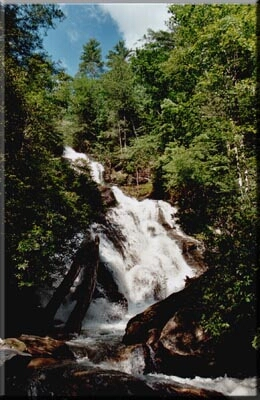
120-foot Holcomb Creek Falls

==== Waterfalls ====
Rabun County has a number of picturesque waterfalls, many of which are easily reached by relatively short trails. Among the favorites of visitors to the county are Dick's Creek Falls, Holcomb Creek Falls and Minnehaha Falls.

==== Hiking trails ====
The county has numerous hiking trails. Most notably, a portion of the Appalachian Trail winds through the county and the county is home to a 37-mile (60 km) portion of the Bartram Trail.

=== Major highways ===
- U.S. Route 23 / U.S. Route 441 / State Route 15
- U.S. Route 76 / State Route 2
- State Route 28
- State Route 197
- State Route 246

US 23 and US 441 run concurrent, following a south–north route through the county, and US 76 runs west–east. SR 246 begins at Dillard and connects to Sky Valley. SR 28 runs for an extremely short distance in the northeastern tip, between the Carolinas.

=== Adjacent counties ===
- Macon County, North Carolina – north
- Oconee County, South Carolina – east
- Habersham County – south
- Towns County – west
- Clay County, North Carolina – northwest

== Flora and fauna ==
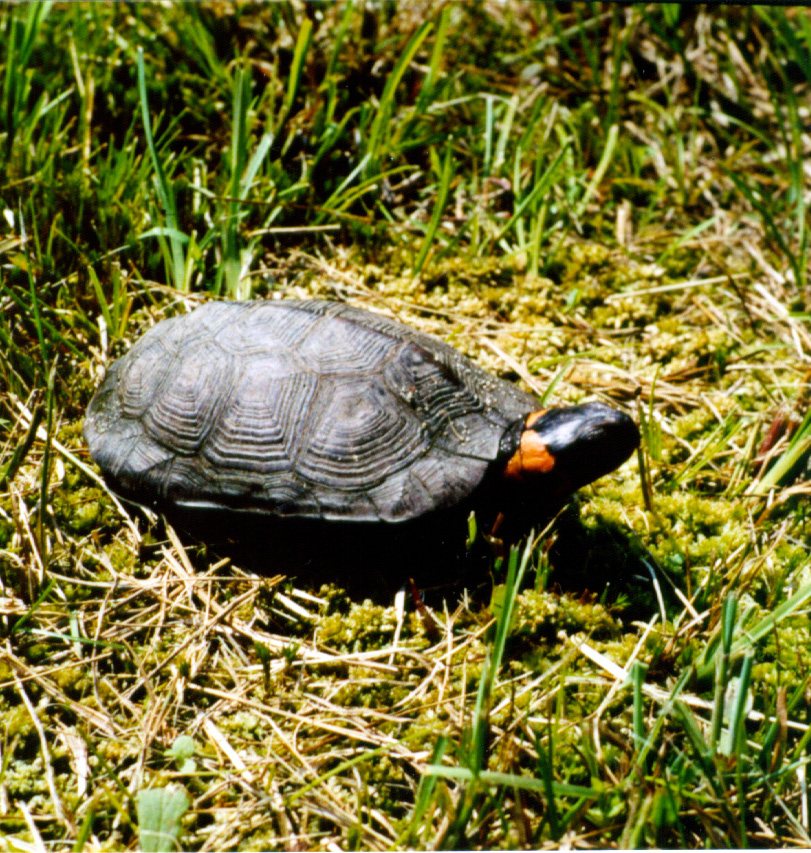
The threatened bog turtle

Rabun County is home to several endangered and threatened species as reported by the US Fish & Wildlife Service and the Georgia Department of Natural Resources.

=== Animals ===
- The bald eagle (Haliaeetus leucocephalus) has been removed from the list of endangered species in the US, but is considered to be an endangered species in Georgia.
- The bog turtle (Clemmys muhlenbergii) is considered to be a threatened species in both the US and Georgia.
- Three fish found in the county still have their status pending on the US endangered species list, but are protected in Georgia: the fatlips minnow (endangered in Georgia), the highscale shiner (threatened in Georgia) and the olive darter (threatened in Georgia).

=== Plants ===
There are 15 plants that are protected in Rabun County, including two that are on the Federal endangered species list: persistent trillium (Trillium persistens), rock gnome lichen (Gymnoderma lineare) and swamp pink (Helonias bullata).

== Demographics ==
Historical population
Census	Pop.	Note	%±
1820	524		—
1830	2,176		315.3%
1840	1,912		−12.1%
1850	2,448		28.0%
1860	3,271		33.6%
1870	3,256		−0.5%
1880	4,634		42.3%
1890	5,606		21.0%
1900	6,285		12.1%
1910	5,562		−11.5%
1920	5,746		3.3%
1930	6,331		10.2%
1940	7,821		23.5%
1950	7,424		−5.1%
1960	7,456		0.4%
1970	8,327		11.7%
1980	10,466		25.7%
1990	11,648		11.3%
2000	15,050		29.2%
2010	16,276		8.1%
2020	16,883		3.7%
2025 (est.)	17,764	▲	5.2%
U.S. Decennial Census; 1790–1880 1890–1910; 1920–1930 1930–1940; 1940–1950 1960–1980; 1980–2000 2010 2020

=== Racial and ethnic composition ===
Rabun County, Georgia – Racial and ethnic composition Note: the US Census treats Hispanic/Latino as an ethnic category. This table excludes Latinos from the racial categories and assigns them to a separate category. Hispanics/Latinos may be of any race.
Race / Ethnicity (NH = Non-Hispanic)	Pop 1980	Pop 1990	Pop 2000	Pop 2010	Pop 2020	% 1980	% 1990	% 2000	% 2010	% 2020
White alone (NH)	10,310	11,488	14,023	14,468	14,625	98.51%	98.63%	93.18%	88.89%	86.63%
Black or African American alone (NH)	62	41	118	144	107	0.59%	0.35%	0.78%	0.88%	0.63%
Native American or Alaska Native alone (NH)	33	33	50	53	28	0.32%	0.28%	0.33%	0.33%	0.17%
Asian alone (NH)	12	17	57	114	60	0.11%	0.15%	0.38%	0.70%	0.36%
Native Hawaiian or Pacific Islander alone (NH)	x	x	0	7	1	x	x	0.00%	0.04%	0.01%
Other race alone (NH)	3	2	5	10	35	0.03%	0.02%	0.03%	0.06%	0.21%
Mixed race or Multiracial (NH)	x	x	114	179	575	x	x	0.76%	1.10%	3.41%
Hispanic or Latino (any race)	46	67	683	1,301	1,452	0.44%	0.58%	4.54%	7.99%	8.60%
Total	10,466	11,648	15,050	16,276	16,883	100.00%	100.00%	100.00%	100.00%	100.00%

=== 2020 census ===
As of the 2020 census, there were 16,883 people and 7,313 households in the county.

The median age was 49.7 years; 18.5% of residents were under the age of 18 and 28.3% of residents were 65 years of age or older. For every 100 females there were 94.0 males, and for every 100 females age 18 and over there were 92.7 males age 18 and over. All residents lived in rural areas (0.0% urban and 100.0% rural).

The racial makeup of the county was 89.0% White, 0.7% Black or African American, 0.4% American Indian and Alaska Native, 0.4% Asian, 0.0% Native Hawaiian and Pacific Islander, 3.1% from some other race, and 6.4% from two or more races. Hispanic or Latino residents of any race comprised 8.6% of the population.

There were 7,313 households in the county, of which 23.3% had children under the age of 18 living with them and 26.2% had a female householder with no spouse or partner present. About 29.7% of all households were made up of individuals and 16.7% had someone living alone who was 65 years of age or older.

There were 11,970 housing units, of which 38.9% were vacant. Among occupied housing units, 75.2% were owner-occupied and 24.8% were renter-occupied. The homeowner vacancy rate was 2.2% and the rental vacancy rate was 8.0%.

=== 2010 census ===
As of the 2010 United States census, there were 16,276 people, 6,780 households, and 4,528 families residing in the county. The population density was 44.0 inhabitants per square mile (17.0/km^{2}). There were 12,313 housing units at an average density of 33.3 units per square mile (12.9 units/km^{2}). The racial makeup of the county was 93.3% white, 1.0% black or African American, 0.7% Asian, 0.4% American Indian, 3.0% from other races, and 1.5% from two or more races. Those of Hispanic or Latino origin made up 8.0% of the population. In terms of ancestry, 16.5% were English, 12.8% were Irish, 11.8% were German, 10.1% were American, and 5.3% were Scotch-Irish.

Of the 6,780 households, 26.6% had children under the age of 18 living with them, 52.4% were married couples living together, 9.6% had a female householder with no husband present, 33.2% were non-families, and 28.5% of all households were made up of individuals. The average household size was 2.34 and the average family size was 2.85. The median age was 45.8 years.

The median income for a household in the county was $34,406 and the median income for a family was $50,410. Males had a median income of $35,951 versus $23,025 for females. The per capita income for the county was $22,471. About 12.7% of families and 18.5% of the population were below the poverty line, including 21.6% of those under age 18 and 11.5% of those age 65 or over.

=== 2000 census ===
As of the census of 2000, there were 15,050 people, 6,279 households, and 4,351 families residing in the county. The population density was 41 people per square mile (16 people/km^{2}). There were 10,210 housing units at an average density of 28 units per square mile (11 units/km^{2}). The racial makeup of the county was 94.88% White, 0.79% Black or African American, 0.43% Native American, 0.38% Asian, 0.03% Pacific Islander, 2.63% from other races, and 0.86% from two or more races. 4.54% of the population were Hispanic or Latino of any race.

There were 6,279 households, out of which 26.50% had children under the age of 18 living with them, 57.40% were married couples living together, 8.10% had a female householder with no husband present, and 30.70% were non-families. 26.80% of all households were made up of individuals, and 11.70% had someone living alone who was 65 years of age or older. The average household size was 2.35 and the average family size was 2.82.

In the county, the population was spread out, with 21.80% under the age of 18, 7.00% from 18 to 24, 25.30% from 25 to 44, 27.70% from 45 to 64, and 18.10% who were 65 years of age or older. The median age was 42 years. For every 100 females there were 97.40 males. For every 100 females age 18 and over, there were 94.50 males.

The median income for a household in the county was $33,899, and the median income for a family was $39,992. Males had a median income of $28,105 versus $21,164 for females. The per capita income for the county was $20,608. About 8.10% of families and 11.10% of the population were below the poverty line, including 11.00% of those under age 18 and 13.00% of those age 65 or over.

== Economy ==
As of early 2006, the county's two largest employers are textile manufacturers: Rabun Apparel, with over 900 jobs, and National Textiles, with 410. In March 2006, Fruit of the Loom announced it would close the Rabun Apparel plant and lay off all 930 employees. That same year, National Textiles also announced layoffs, which had already targeted its plants in North Carolina and Tennessee.

== Education ==
The Rabun County School District, which has the same boundaries as the county, holds pre-school to grade twelve, and consists of a primary school, an elementary school, a middle school, and a high school. The district has 140 full-time teachers and over 2,221 students.

- Rabun County Primary School
- Rabun County Elementary School
- Rabun County Middle School
- Rabun County High School

Rabun Gap-Nacoochee School, a private residential and day school, also operates in the county. It serves boarding students in grades 6–12 and day students pre-K–12.

== Communities ==
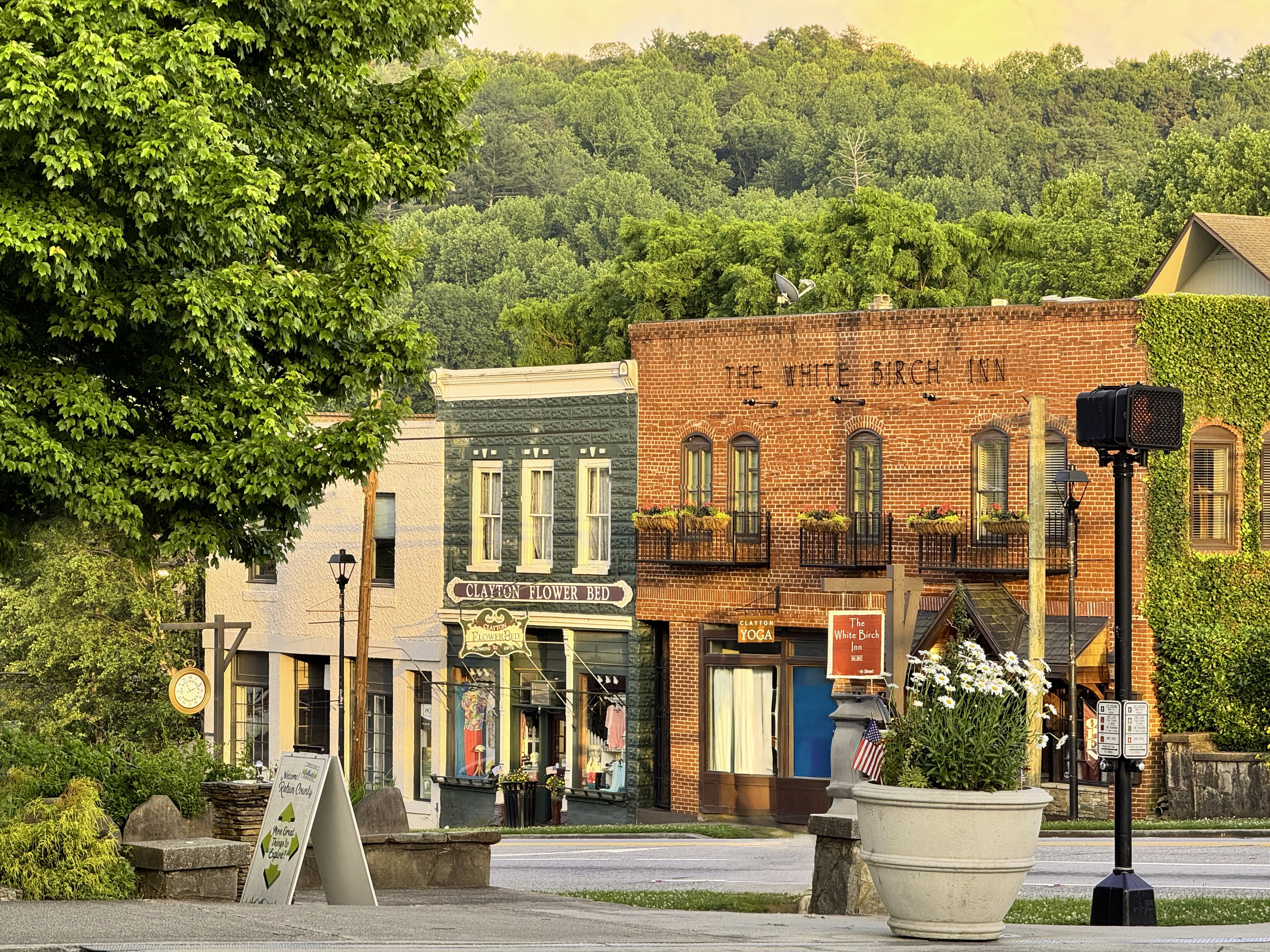
Downtown Clayton

=== Cities ===
- Clayton (county seat)
- Dillard
- Sky Valley

=== Towns ===
- Mountain City
- Tallulah Falls
- Tiger

=== Unincorporated communities ===
- Wiley
- Lakemont
- Persimmon
- Pine Mountain
- Rabun Gap

== In popular culture ==
- Rabun County is the home of the magazine Foxfire. The publication was launched in 1966, when Eliot Wigginton and his students in an English class at Rabun Gap-Nacoochee School initiated a project to engage students in writing. The class decided to publish a magazine over the course of the semester. Its articles were the product of the students' interviewing their relatives and local citizens about how lifestyles had changed over the course of their lives and dealt with traditions in the rural area. The magazine covers topics of the lifestyle, culture, crafts, and skills of people in southern Appalachia.
- Rabun was the primary shooting location for the 1972 film Deliverance and used many locals as extras, including Billy Redden. One setting for the movie is explicitly stated to be Tallulah Falls, a town in Rabun County, though the county itself isn’t mentioned by name.
- The Deliverance of Rabun County is a 2012 documentary that explored the effects of Deliverance on the county population.
- Rabun County is the setting for the play Foxfire, based on books of the same name compiled from, or beyond the scope of, stories in the similarly named magazine. The play had its Broadway premiere in 1982 starring Jessica Tandy and her husband Hume Cronyn. The play was later made into a Hallmark TV movie, starring Tandy, Cronyn, and John Denver. In both the play and the movie, there are several references to Rabun County and the surrounding area.
- Larry Burkett's 1991 fantasy novel The Illuminati (1991) is set partly in Rabun County. It and the county seat of Clayton become the refuge of the book's protagonists after forces take control over the American economy; Clayton is safe due to the antiquated analog communications gear and general isolation underlying stereotypes of the area.
- Minnie Woolsey who appeared in Freaks was born in Rabun County in 1880.

== See also ==
- National Register of Historic Places listings in Rabun County, Georgia
- List of counties in Georgia
