= Dillard (name) =

Dillard is both a given name and a surname of French origin. Notable people with that name include:

== Given name ==
- Dillard E. Bird (1906–1990), American industrial engineer
- Dillard Chandler (1907–1992), American Appalachian Folk singer
- Dillard Crocker (1925–2014), American basketball player
- Dillard Rucker Fant (1841–1908), American cattle driver and soldier

== Surname ==
- Addie E. Dillard, American educator
- Aiden Dillard, American film director and artist
- Al Dillard (born c. 1969), former college basketball player
- Andre Dillard (born 1995), American football player
- Andy Dillard (born 1981), American baseball player
- Annie Dillard (1945–2026), American author
- Bill Dillard (1911–1995), American jazz trumpeter
- Chandra Dillard (born 1965), American politician
- Cierra Dillard (born 1996), American-Senegalese basketball player
- Don Dillard (1937–2022), American baseball player
- Doug Dillard (1937–2012), American musician
- Dudley Dillard (1913–1991), American economist
- Dwaine Dillard (1949–2008), American basketball player
- G. G. Dillard (1839–1921), American politician from Mississippi
- Gavin Geoffrey Dillard (born 1954), American poet and songwriter
- Gordon Dillard (born 1964), American baseball player
- Harrison Dillard (1923–2019), American Olympic athlete
- J. D. Dillard, American director, screenwriter, and producer
- James Dillard (disambiguation), several people
- James H. Dillard (1856–1940), American educator
- James Price Dillard, Communication Professor at Penn State University
- Jarett Dillard (born 1985), American football player
- Jill Duggar Dillard (born 1991), American television personality
- Jim Dillard (born 1933), American politician from Virginia
- Joey Lee Dillard (1924–2009), American linguist
- John Dillard (1760–1842), early settler of North Carolina and Georgia
- Kevin Dillard (born 1989), American-Albanian professional basketball player
- Kirk Dillard (born 1955), American politician from Illinois
- Mamie Dillard (1874-1954), African American educator, clubwoman and suffragist
- Margaret Dillard, American artist
- Mark Dillard (born 1986), American football player
- Mickey Dillard (born 1958), American former basketball player
- Mike Dillard (born 1964), drummer for the Melvins
- Oliver W. Dillard (1926–2015), US Army major general
- Pat Dillard (1873–1907), American baseball player
- Phillip Dillard (born 1986), American football player
- R. H. W. Dillard (1937–2023), American poet
- Raymond Bryan Dillard (1944–1993), American Old Testament scholar
- Ricky Dillard (born 1965), American gospel singer
- Stacey Dillard (born 1968), American football player
- Stephen Dillard (born 1969), an appellate court judge and lecturer
- Steve Dillard (baseball) (born 1951), former Major League Baseball player
- Tim Dillard (born 1983), American baseball player
- Tramar Dillard (AKA Flo Rida, born 1979), American rapper
- Varetta Dillard (1933–1993), American rhythm and blues singer
- Victor Dillard (1897–1945), French Jesuit, hero of the French Resistance during World War II
- Victoria Dillard (born 1969), American actress
- William T. Dillard (1914–2002), founder of the Dillard's department store chain

== See also ==
- Dillard (disambiguation)
