= Mud Creek Falls =

- Location within Georgia
- Location: Rabun County, Georgia, U.S.
- Coordinates: 34.983433°N 83.266835°W
- Type: Cascade
- Total height: 100 ft (30 m)
- Watercourse: Mud Creek

Mud Creek Falls is a waterfall located in the small resort city of Sky Valley, Georgia, in Rabun County, Georgia, that cascades for over 100 feet (30 m) eventually into Estatoah Falls near Dillard, Georgia.

While no hiking is required to reach the falls, there is a 2 miles (3.2 km) hike to the falls along the Mud Creek Falls trail from Sky Valley, Georgia. It is also accesible by car and has parking within 50–75 feet (15–23 m) and is usually accommodating to handicapped. Above Mud Creek Falls is Spring Lake.
