= Dillard =

Dillard may refer to:

== People ==
- Dillard (name)

== Places in the United States ==
- Dillard, Alabama
- Dillard, Georgia
- Dillard, New Orleans, Louisiana
- Dillard, Missouri
- Dillard, North Carolina
- Dillard, Oklahoma
- Dillard, Oregon

== Arts, entertainment, and media ==
- The Dillards, an American bluegrass band
- Dillard, Down-tempo psychedelic electronic music producer

== Brands and enterprises ==
- Dillard House, a restaurant
- Dillard's, a department store chain in the United States

== Education ==
- Dillard High School, Fort Lauderdale, Florida, U.S.A.
- Dillard University, New Orleans, Louisiana, U.S.A.
