= Estatoah Falls =

Coordinates: 34°59′28″N 83°20′40″W

Estatoah Falls are located on Mud Creek in Rabun County, Georgia. The falls are located on private property and are not open to the public. The falls may be viewed from several places along State Route 246. There are also some smaller falls (about 100 feet) in the small resort city of Sky Valley, Georgia called Little Estatoah Falls or Mud Creek Falls. Estatoah Falls drop several hundred feet in several dramatic cascades but are only viewable from a distance. Above Estatoah falls is Spring Lake.

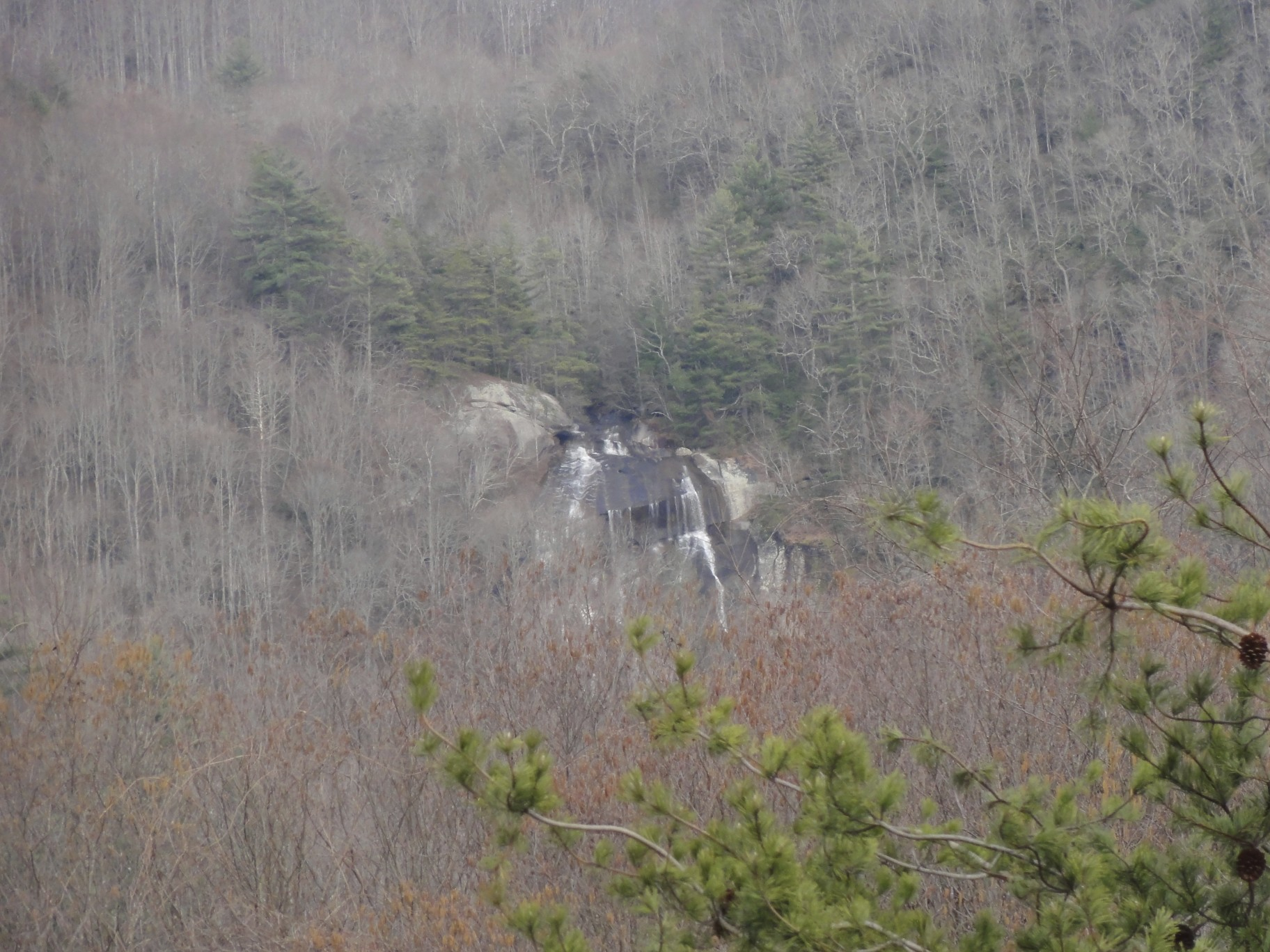
Estatoah Falls

The name of the falls is from the name of a Cherokee Indian village. The Cherokee village of Eastertoy is thought to have been near Dillard, Georgia. Estatoah is an alternate spelling of Eastertoy.

== See also ==
- List of waterfalls
