= Scaly Mountain, North Carolina =

Unincorporated community in North Carolina, US

Coordinates: 35°00′42″N 83°18′59″W

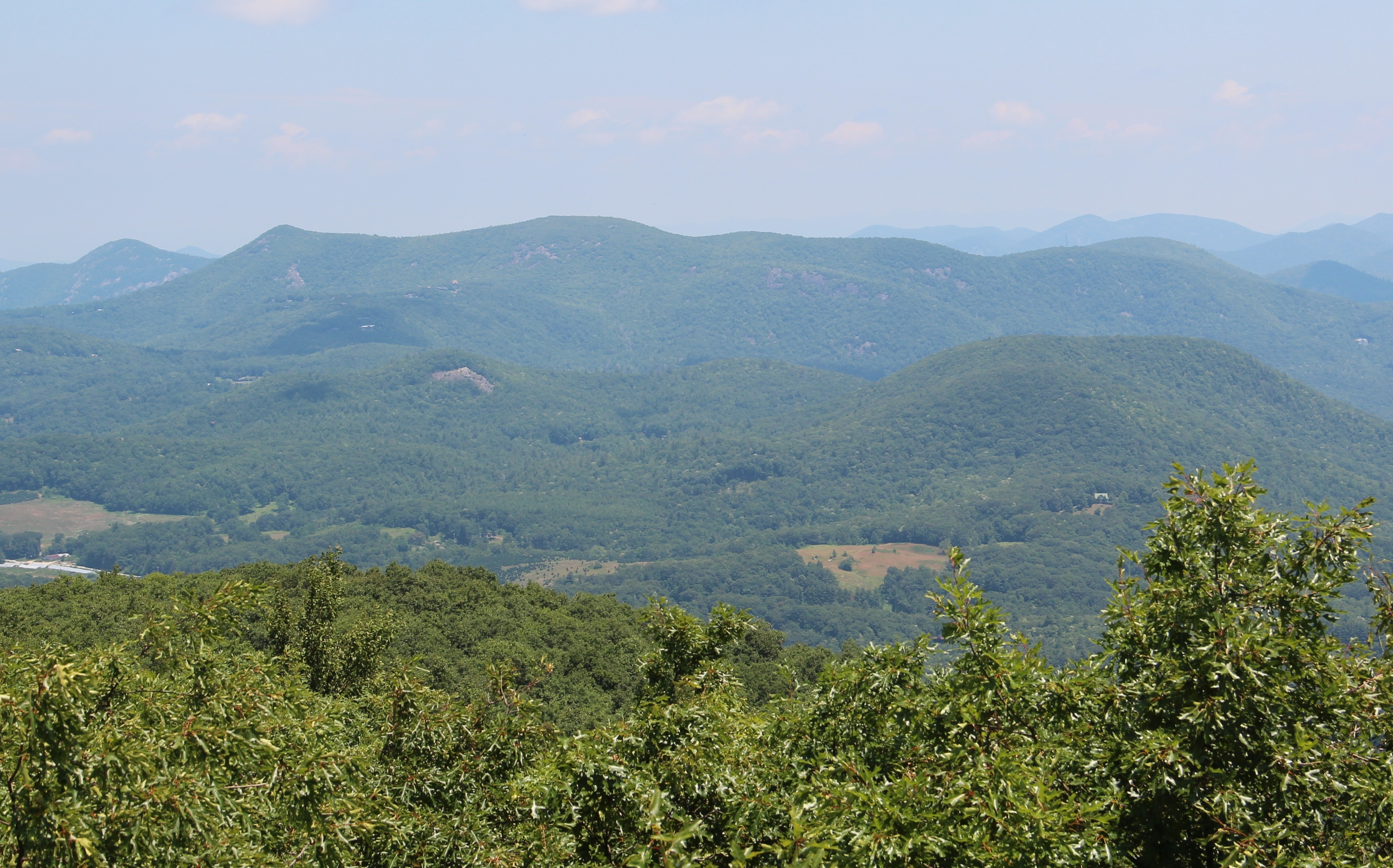
Scaly Mountain, viewed from Rabun Bald

Scaly Mountain (separate of near-easterly big / little Scaly Mountains, per se - see External link below) is a small unincorporated community along North Carolina Highway 106, southwest of Highlands and northeast of Dillard, Georgia (about halfway between the two), and nearest to Sky Valley, Georgia, just to the south-southwest. It is in the south-central area of Macon County, North Carolina, United States in Flats Township, close to the Georgia and North Carolina state line. The ZIP Code for Scaly Mountain is 28775.

== Recreation ==
Scaly Mountain community terrain is more like a large hill than a mountain, and was used for skiing until early 2004 (formerly "Ski Scaly"), until it reopened in December as a weekend snow tubing venue only. Nearby Sky Valley Resort also ceased being the only ski area in Georgia around the same time, due in large part to repeatedly warm winters since the mid-1990s, unlike the 1970s and 1980s in and after which they were founded. Both areas were opened due to their proximity to and accessibility from metro Atlanta, whose upscale north and northeastern suburbs lie roughly just 100 miles or 150 kilometers to the southwest, and have since crept ever-closer.

The vertical rise is just 223 feet (68 m), from an elevation of 3,802 feet (1,159 m) at the base to 4,026 feet (1,227 m) at the top. The top of Highlands Outpost is now home to a beautiful RV Park (Scaly Mountain Slopes) with cabins offering a full 360 degree view for miles. Average annual snowfall is 38.2 inches (97 cm), but the entire usable area is covered by snowmaking. Snow tubing is open from the last weekend in October to late March, thanks to new year round all weather snowmaking. Snow was made on July 4 weekend in 2021. Highlands Outpost also has gem mining, trout fishing, ice skating (during the Winter time), turf tubing (during the Summer time), and a brand new alpine coaster called the “Scaly Screamer” which opened Thanksgiving Day 2021. There is also a café upstairs which is open for lunch everyday, and a gift shop, the Bartram Market.

Opened in late 2012, zipline park Highlands Aerial Park offers zipline canopy tours, a family challenge course, and a botanical nature trail at the elevation of 3,420 feet (1,040 m) on High Holly Mountain, the westernmost mountain of the Highlands Plateau. This ecological tour includes the signature "Squealing Mare", a zip over 1,500 feet (460 m) long with long-range views of the mile-high mountains of the Nantahala National Forest. The "Wilderness Nature Trail" features a 150 feet (46 m) swing bridge over a spring-fed waterfall, where over 100 wildflowers, native shrubs, and old-growth forest trees are identified, and each season offers a new study in mountain plant life. Highlands Aerial Park is located on Dillard Road (NC 106), between Highlands, NC and Dillard, GA.
