= Warwoman Dell =

Valley in Rabun County, Georgia, United States

Coordinates: 34.882036°N 83.350992°W

Warwoman Dell is a wooded valley or dell located east of Clayton, Georgia, United States, in Rabun County.

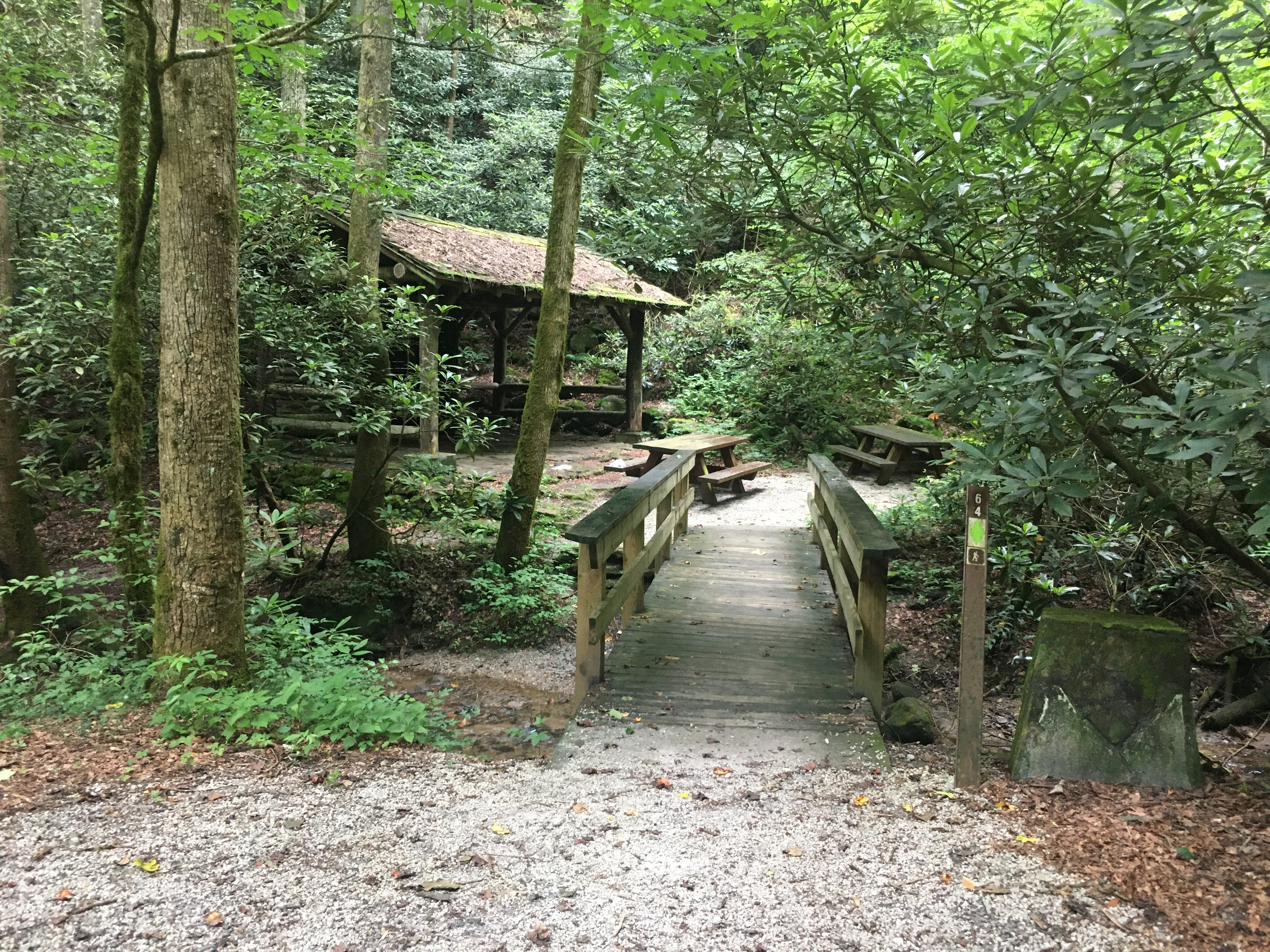
Picnic area in Warwoman Dell

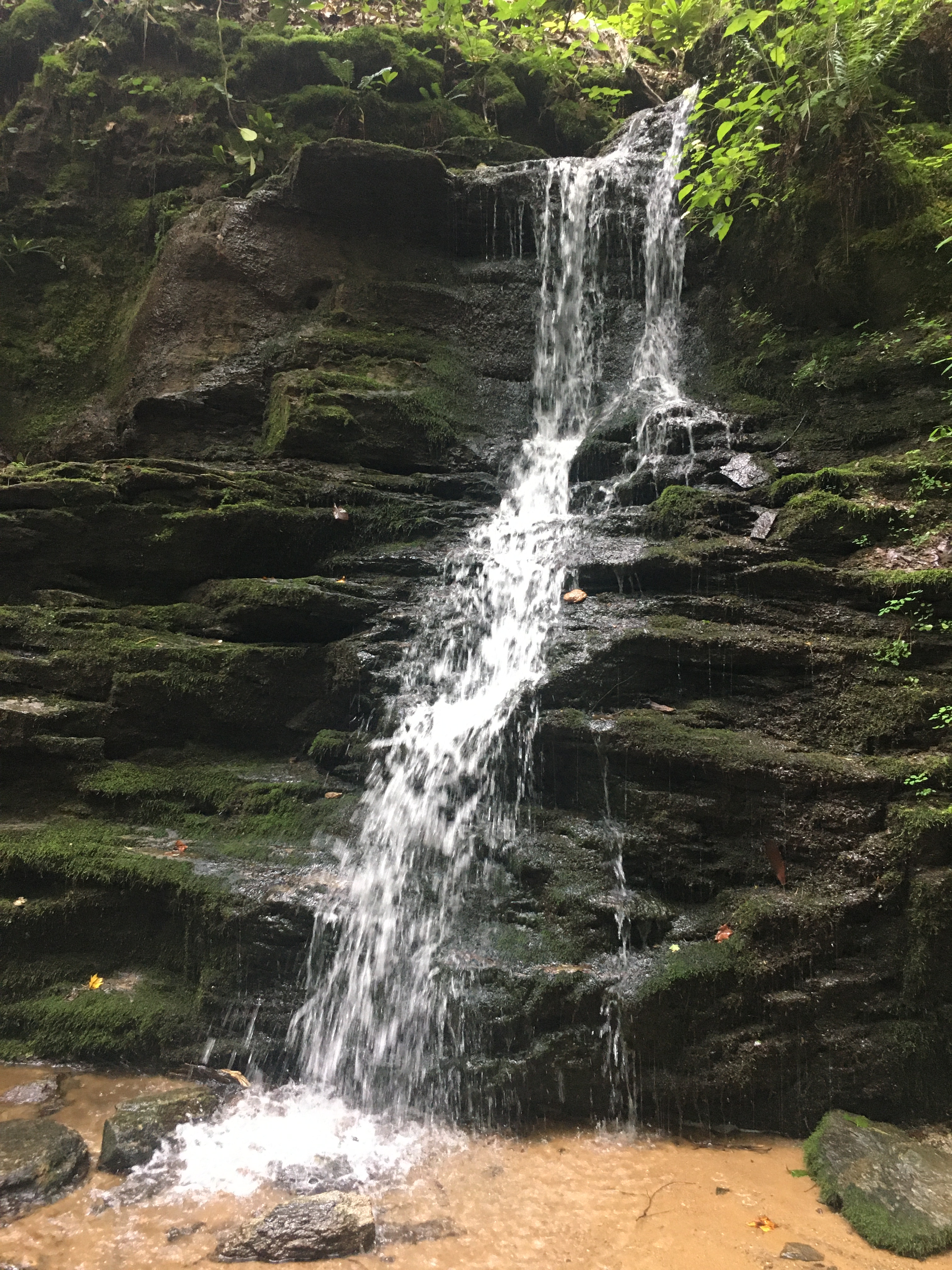
Waterfall in Warwoman Dell

== Name ==
Warwoman Dell and the Warwoman Creek, which flows through the valley, are named after a woman that the Cherokee called "warwoman." There is some degree of controversy as to which of two women from Georgia known as "warwoman" is the namesake. Some assert that the area is named after Nancy Hart, while others argue that Nancy Ward was the warwoman. Nancy Hart (a Revolutionary War era woman) was a resident of what is now Elbert County, Georgia and is the person after whom Hart County, Georgia is named. While nothing is certain, the legends associated with Warwoman Dell seem to more closely match the legends associated with Nancy Ward. That, coupled with the fact that Rabun County was once part of the Cherokee Nation, suggests that Nancy Ward is the namesake for Warwoman Dell and Warwoman Creek.

== Trails ==
The Bartram Trail winds through Warwoman Dell and two of Rabun County's favorite waterfalls are located in the area: Becky Branch Falls and Martin Creek Falls. Much of the valley is within the borders of the Tallulah Ranger District of the Chattahoochee National Forest.

== Sources ==
- Georgia Place Names by Kenneth K. Krakow, 3rd Edition
- GeorgiaTrails.com discussion of Warwoman Dell and Becky Branch Falls

- "Warwoman Dell". Geographic Names Information System. United States Geological Survey, United States Department of the Interior.
