= North Carolina Highway 106 =

Highway in Georgia and North Carolina

Georgia State Route 246 and North Carolina Highway 106
- SR 246 highlighted in blue, NC 106 in red

Route information
- Maintained by GDOT and NCDOT
- Length: 14.31 mi (23.03 km) SR 246: 3.12 miles (5.02 km); NC 106: 11.19 miles (18.01 km)
- Existed: 1940–present

Major junctions
- West end: US 23 / US 441 / SR 15 in Dillard, GA
- North end: US 64 / NC 28 in Highlands, NC

Location
- Country: United States
- States: Georgia, North Carolina
- Counties: GA: Rabun; NC: Macon

Highway system
- Georgia State Highway System; Interstate; US; State; Special
- North Carolina Highway System; Interstate; US; State; Scenic
← SR 245	SR 246	→ SR 247
← NC 105	NC 106	→ NC 107

Georgia State Route 246 (SR 246) and North Carolina Highway 106 (NC 106) are actually a pair of highway designations that run concurrently on a single road that runs from Dillard, Georgia to Highlands, North Carolina. The route is unique for its five state crossings between Georgia and North Carolina along the southern slopes of Kinley Mountain.

== Route description ==
SR 246 begins at the intersection of US 23/US 441/SR 15, in Dillard, Georgia. As it enters North Carolina for the first time, the road widens to improve staying in the curves, with the north-east side becoming two lanes. During the third incursion in Georgia, there is an overlook with a clear view toward the west of the town of Dillard. The overlook is above Estatoah Falls but can not be seen. The falls are on private property and cannot be accessed. They can be seen only at a distance from Hwy 246 heading from Dillard to Sky Valley. By the final border crossing the highway will merge back into two-lanes. Continuing north in North Carolina, several roads near the border connect back into Georgia to the mountain resort area of Sky Valley. Passing through the community of Scaly Mountain, the highway ends at US 64/NC 28, in Highlands.

In Georgia, the route is designated east–west, while in North Carolina it is north–south. While the highway is maintained by Georgia Department of Transportation (GDOT) until the final border crossing, north of the southern end of Wood Valley Road, the highway is still recognized as NC 106 (Dillard Road) within North Carolina and same for SR 246 (Highlands Road/Larry McClure Highway) in Georgia.

== History ==
NC 106 was established in 1940 as new primary routing from the Georgia state line to Highlands. It has changed little since inception.

Originally, from 1921 to 1940, NC 106 traversed from NC 28, in Cashiers, to NC 10, in Sylva. In 1931, it was extended south to the South Carolina state line. In 1940, it was renumbered to NC 107 to sync with South Carolina.

Previously there were five sets of welcome signs announcing the crossings of the state line. There is now only a single pair of signs (either at the middle or easternmost crossing), but with very small signs like mileposts marking each intermediate crossing, with GA or NC written from top to bottom instead of numbers.

== Major intersections ==
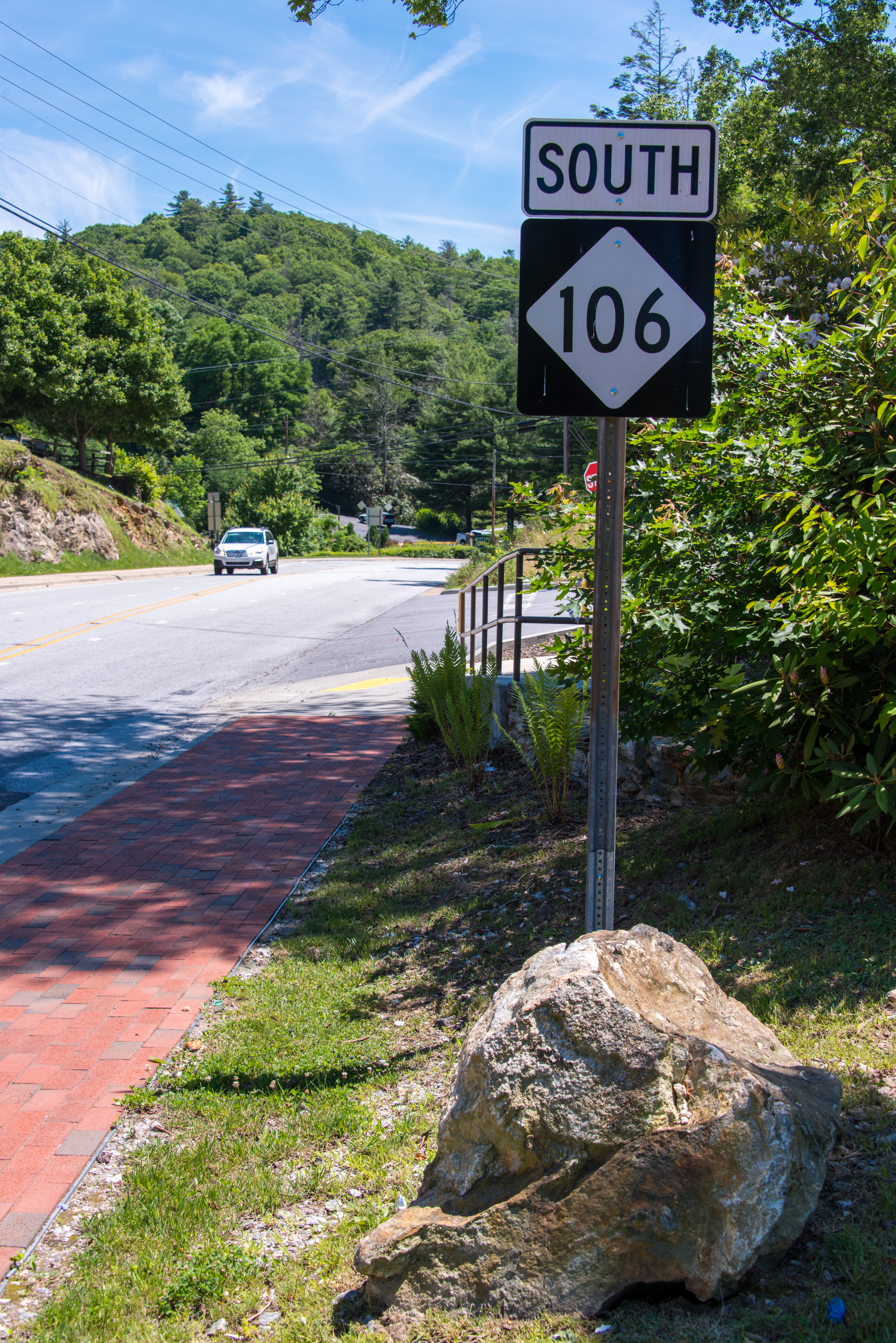
NC 106 along Dillard Road, in Highlands, NC

County	Location	mi	km	Destinations	Notes
Rabun	Dillard	0.00	0.00	US 23 / US 441 / SR 15 – Clayton, Franklin	Western terminus of SR 246
Georgia–North Carolina state line		1.99	3.20	Route transitions from SR 246 to NC 106	
North Carolina–Georgia state line		2.22	3.57	Route transitions from NC 106 to SR 246	
Georgia–North Carolina state line		2.32	3.73	Route transitions from SR 246 to NC 106	
North Carolina–Georgia state line		2.69	4.33	Route transitions from NC 106 to SR 246	
Georgia–North Carolina state line		3.82	6.15	Route transitions from SR 246 to NC 106	
Macon	Highlands	14.31	23.03	US 64 / NC 28 (Main Street) – Franklin, Brevard, Walhalla	Northern terminus of NC 106
1.000 mi = 1.609 km; 1.000 km = 0.621 mi: Route transition
