= Wesser Bald =

Mountain in North Carolina, United States

Coordinates: 35°16′37″N 83°34′39″W

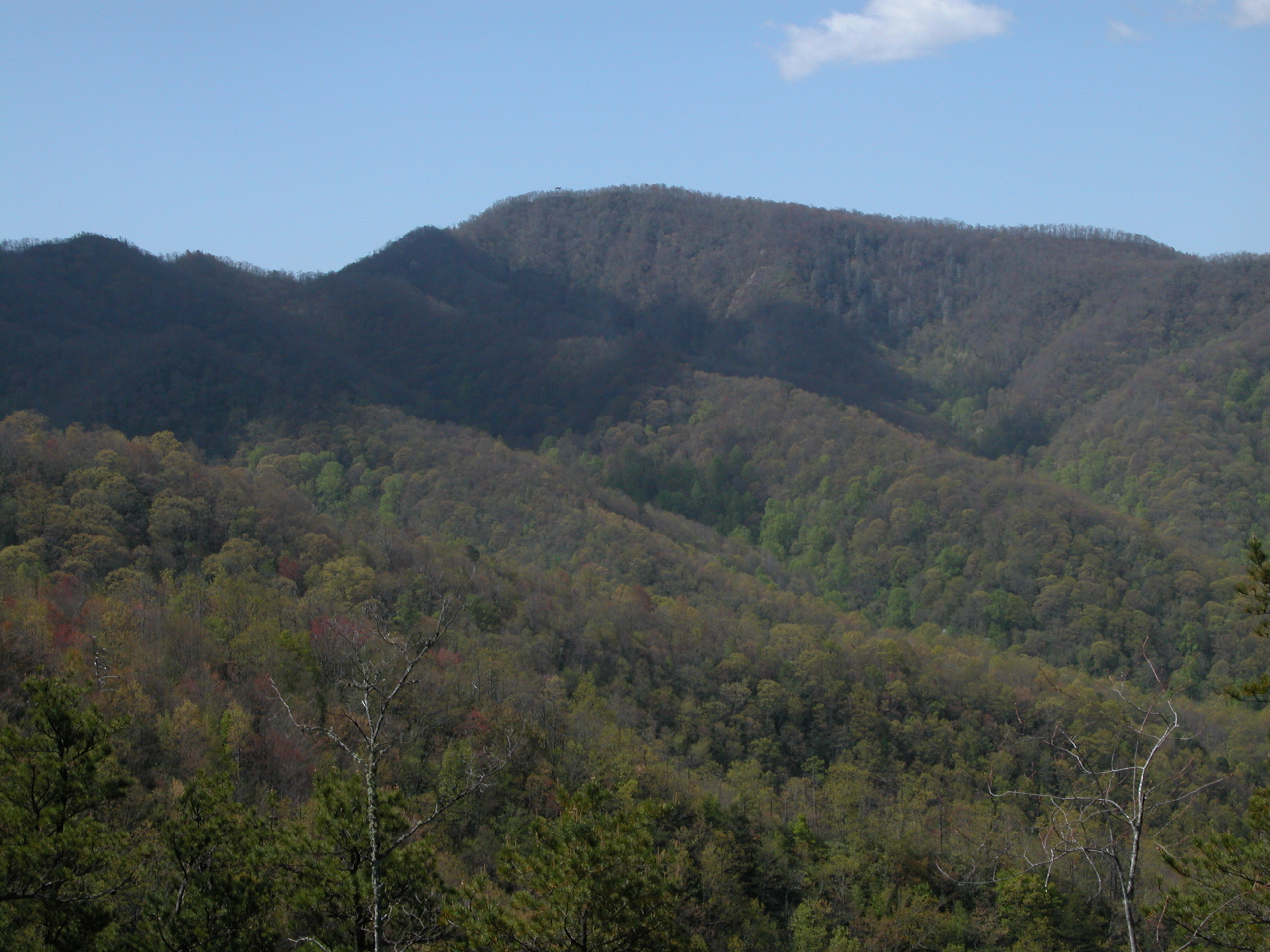

Wesser Bald is a summit located in Macon County, North Carolina, near the community of Wesser. A wooden fire tower at the summit provides hikers with unimpeded views of the Great Smoky Mountains National Park and also the Nantahala Mountains. The Appalachian Trail traverses the summit from roughly north to south with the Nantahala Outdoor Center lying to the north within the Nantahala Gorge and Tellico gap just to the south. Tellico gap has unimproved road access. The climb from Tellico Gap takes an average of 20 minutes. Also, a third route, the blue trail, departs from the end of Wesser Creek Road and follows Wesser Creek up to a point just south of the summit to a fork with the Appalachian Trail. The summit is located at 4,627 ft (1,410 m). and is within Nantahala National Forest. A map detailing the highway routes to access Tellico Gap is available at the Nantahala Outdoor Center. Observable landforms include Wayah Bald, the Nantahala Gorge, and Kuwohi among others. The Wesser Fire Tower provides 360 degree views of the Smokies in a short 1.5 mile hike from Tellico Gap on the Appalachian Trail, with an elevation gain of about 767 feet. The Fire Tower was originally reported as destroyed during the forest fires which ravaged the Nantahala Forest in November, 2016 but it was later learned that it survived.
