= The Economics of John Maynard Keynes =

The Economics of John Maynard Keynes: The Theory of Monetary Economy
- 1953 UK edition (publ. Lockwood & Son)
- Author: Dudley Dillard
- Language: English
- Subject: Economics
- Publisher: Prentice Hall, Inc. (US)
- Publication date: 1948
- Publication place: United States
- Media type: Print
- Pages: 384
- ISBN: 978-1-4191-2894-3
- OCLC: 166891

The Economics of John Maynard Keynes: The Theory of Monetary Economy is a non-fiction work by Dudley Dillard which seeks to make The General Theory of Employment, Interest and Money by John Maynard Keynes understandable to both the economist and to the non-economist. It was first published in 1948.

In addition to explaining the economic theories of Keynes, Dillard also includes a chapter on Keynes's philosophical development and the “social philosophy toward which it leads.”

Throughout the book, Dillard provides summaries and examines Keynes' concepts on employment, income, saving, marginal propensity to consume, the investment multiplier, fiscal policy, postwar inflation, interest, and wages.

== History ==
Originally published in October 1948, Dillard's book received nine additional prints with the final 10th edition being printed in September 1961. All editions were facilitated by Prentice-Hall Inc. In the preface, Dillard asserts that the book will cover the "economics of Keynes rather than Keynesian economics (Dillard, vii)." This distinction is essential as this book was published when Keynes' theories were taking grasp within the Economics world and Dillard opted to discuss the ideas of a singular man as opposed to the swirling debates ongoing at the time.

== Reception ==
Since its publishing, the book has been translated into over 10 languages.

== See also ==
Economic Development of the North Atlantic Community: Historical Introduction to Modern Economics (1967). Dudley's second major work.

Proudhon, Gesell and Keynes: An Investigation of Some "anti-Marxian Socialist" Antecedents of Keynes' General Theory of Employment, Interest and Money (1997). Dudley's third major work.
