= Bartram Trail =

Long-distance hiking trail in the southern US

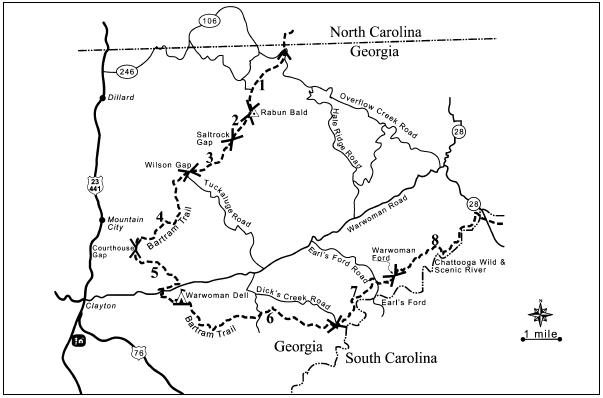
- Map of the Bartram Trail in Georgia
- Length: 115.4 mi (185.7 km)
- Location: Rabun County, Georgia and Macon County / Swain County, North Carolina, U.S.
- Trailheads: Cheoah Bald; Russell Bridge near Satolah, Georgia
- Use: Hiking
- Highest point: Wayah Bald, 5,385 ft (1,641 m)
- Lowest point: Chattooga River, 1,500 ft (460 m)
- Difficulty: Medium
- Season: All year

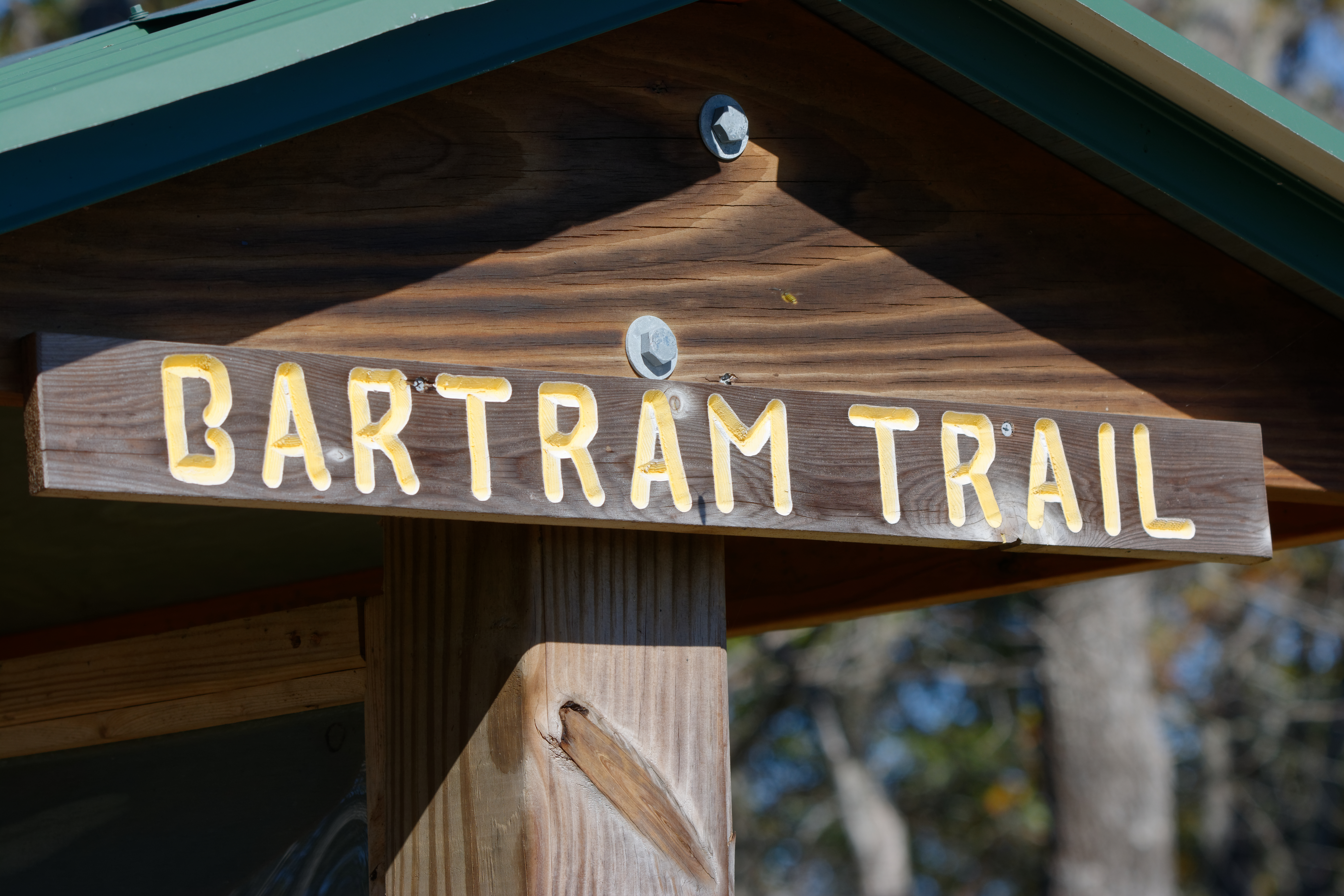
Sign on Wayah Bald, North Carolina

The Bartram Trail follows the approximate route of 18th-century naturalist William Bartram's southern journey from March 1773 to January 1777. Bartram explored much of the territory which is now the states of North and South Carolina, Georgia, Florida, Alabama, Mississippi, Louisiana and Tennessee.

The most established section is a hiking trail that winds about 115 miles (185 km) from the North Georgia mountains into North Carolina. It has been designated as a National Recreation Trail in Georgia, North Carolina, and Alabama.

The Bartram Trail Conference, Inc., was founded in 1976 to identify and mark the route of Bartram's southern explorations and to promote interest in developing recreational trails and botanical gardens along the route. The BTC also encourages the study, preservation and interpretation of the William Bartram heritage at both cultural and natural sites in Trail states.

The North Carolina Bartram Trail Society was organized in 1977. The Society reached an agreement with the U.S. Forest Service to mark the general trail corridor within the Nantahala National Forest, and to blaze and build the trail, which was completed. They conduct meetings in the Spring and Fall each year, and organize trail work hikes.

== Georgia ==
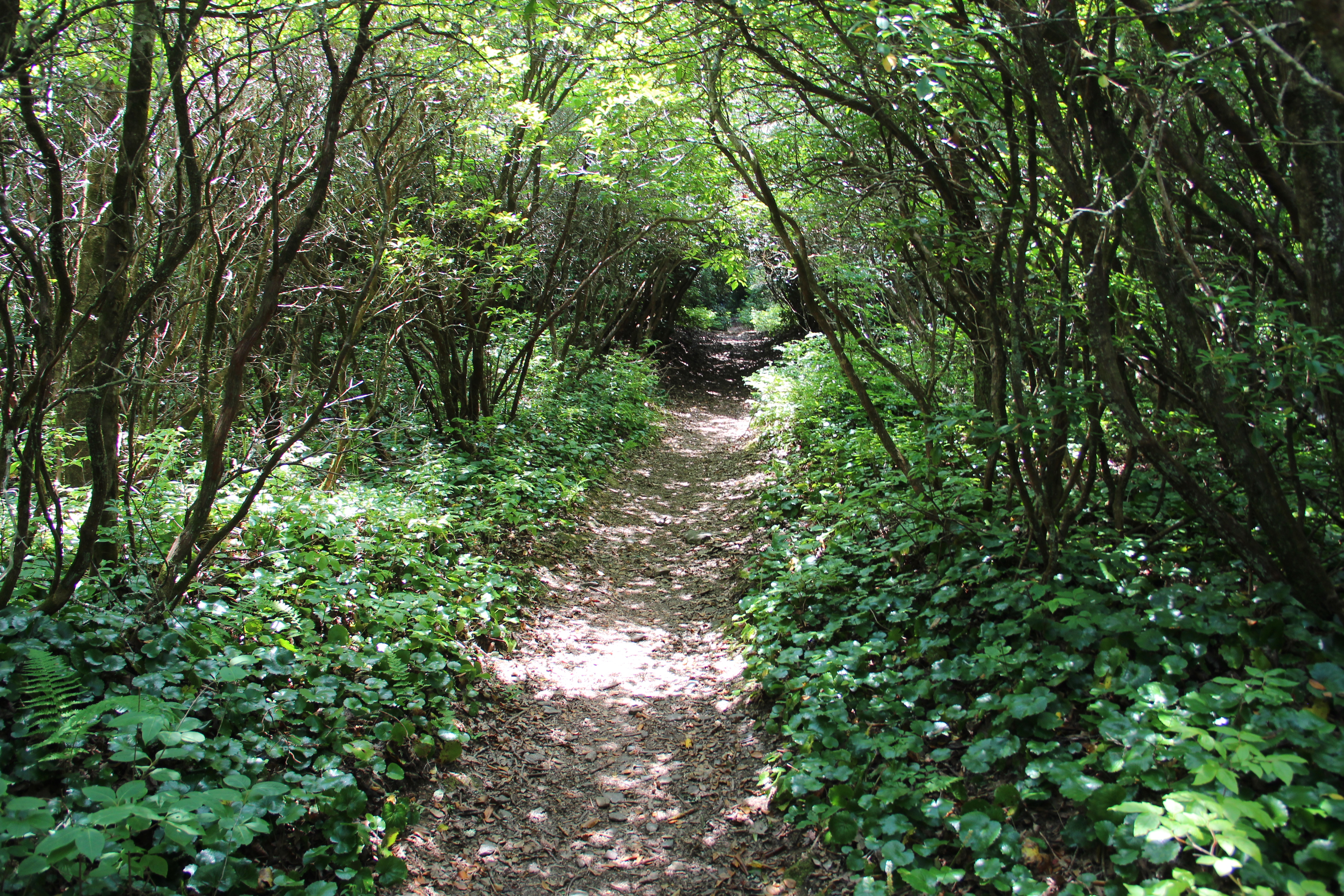
Bartram Trail on Rabun Bald

In Georgia, the Bartram Trail covers 37.7 miles (60.7 km). After entering Georgia from North Carolina, the trail follows a ridge line to its highest point in Georgia at Rabun Bald , 4,696 feet (1,431 m), the second-highest point in the state, along the Eastern Continental Divide. From there it passes Martin Creek Falls and Becky Branch Falls as it drops to go through Warwoman Dell. From Warwoman Dell, it climbs again before dropping to its lowest elevations along a stretch of the Wild and Scenic Chattooga River. The Bartram Trail has a number of waterfalls, like Martin Creek Falls and Becky Branch Falls, and vistas from Rabun Bald.

The Georgia portion of the trail is entirely in the Chattooga River District of the Chattahoochee National Forest and is managed by the United States Forest Service. The southern terminus of the Bartram Trail is at its intersection with Georgia State Route 28 at the South Carolina state line.

== South Carolina ==
The trail connects into South Carolina along the Chattooga Trail, joining with the Foothills Trail, which is also a designated National Recreation Trail.

== North Carolina ==
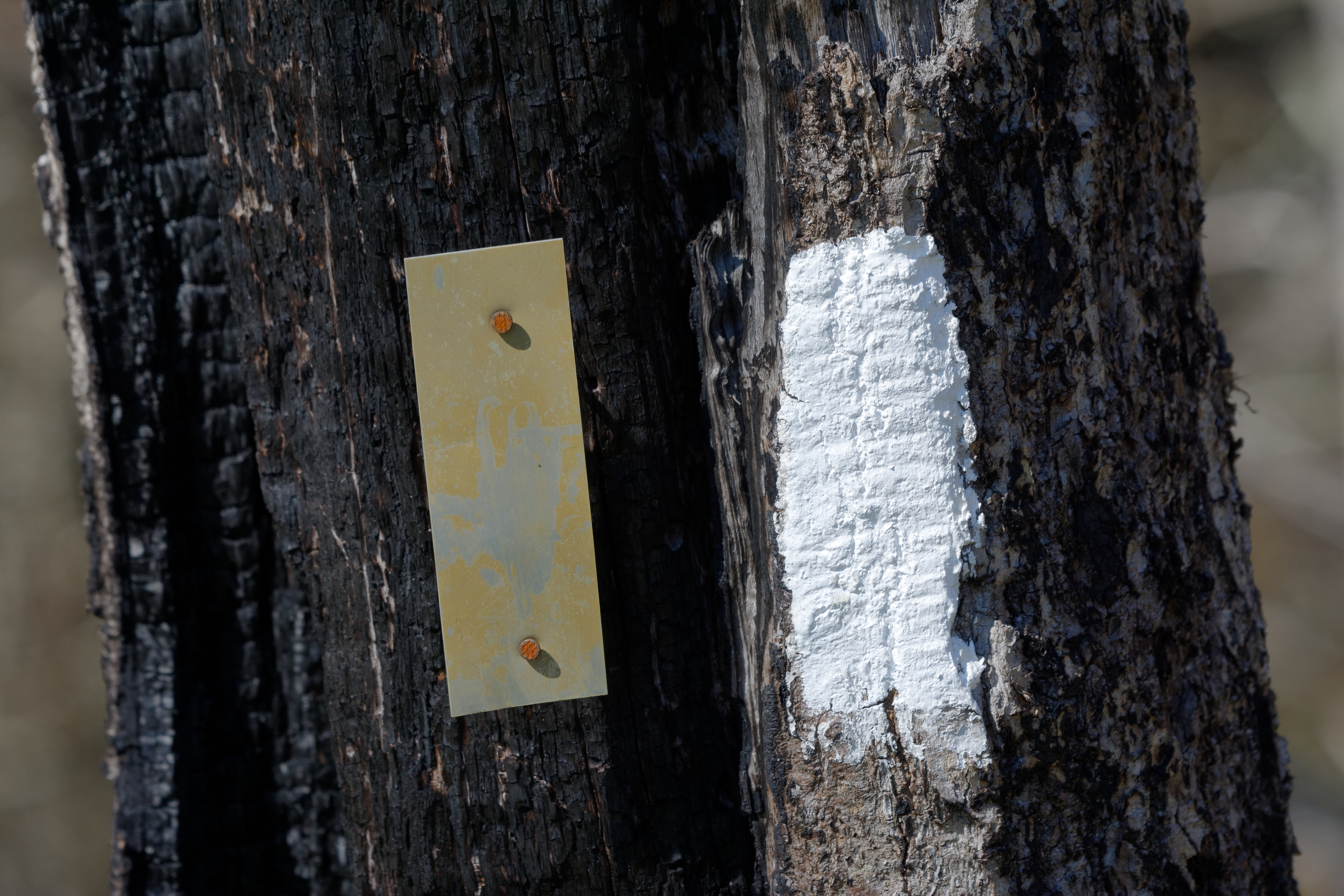
Bartram Trail meets the Appalachian Trail on Wayah Bald, North Carolina

In North Carolina, the Bartram Trail meanders 78.4 miles (126.2 km) near the mountainous towns of Franklin, Highlands, Andrews, Robbinsville, and Nantahala. It includes 5,385 feet (1,641 m) Wayah Bald, which is the highest point on the trail and where it crosses the Appalachian Trail. There is an optional 9 miles (14 km) canoe section on the Little Tennessee River.

== Florida ==
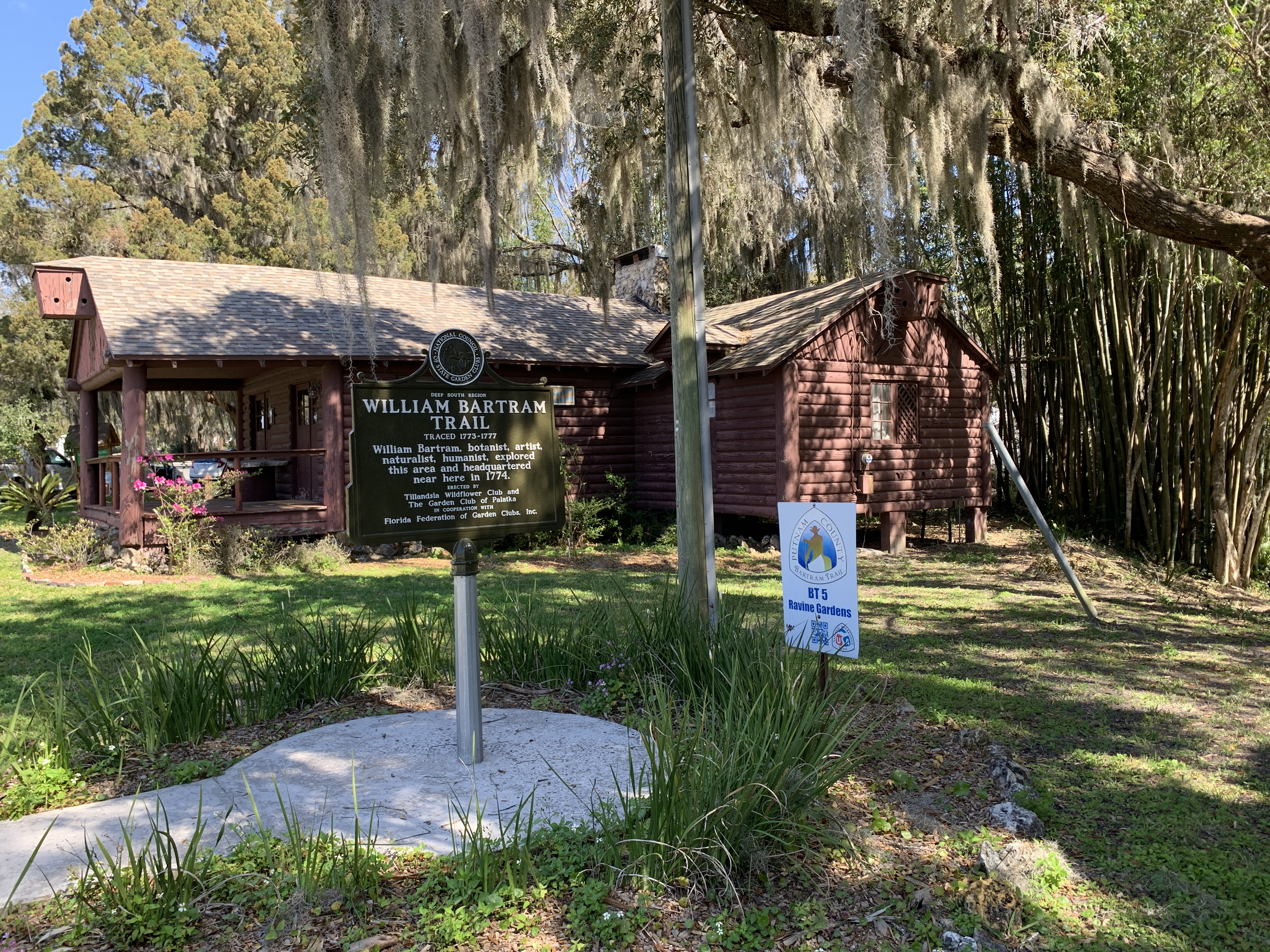
Bartram Trail at Ravine Gardens State Park, Florida

The William Bartram Scenic & Historic Highway, named in honor of the botanist's travels in Florida, runs 17 miles (27 km) along the east side of the St. Johns River from Jacksonville south to northwestern St. Johns County on State Road 13.

Bartram Trail High School at St. Johns, Florida (just south of Jacksonville) is named for the scenic highway and Bartram's exploration route around the Northern St. Johns County area.

== Alabama ==
The 200-mile (320 km) long Bartram Canoe Trail system of canoe and kayak water trails in the Mobile-Tensaw River Delta is one of the longest in the United States. It is operated by the Alabama Department of Conservation and offers canoeists and kayakers 13 different routes to choose from, including three routes with floating campsites. Named for William Bartram, it represents a small section of Bartram's travels by boat on the Mobile, Tensaw and Tombigbee Rivers in the summer of 1775.

The William Bartram Arboretum (32.51°N 86.25°W) is located within Fort Toulouse Park, near Wetumpka, Alabama and is named in honor of the 18th century naturalist, who visited the area in 1776.

== See also ==
- List of Hiking Trails in Alabama
