= James Dillard =

James Dillard may refer to:

- James H. Dillard (James Hardy Dillard, 1856–1940), rector of the College of William and Mary, president of the Jeanes Fund and John F. Slater Fund
- Jim Dillard (James Hardy Dillard II, born 1933), his grandson, former member of the Virginia House of Delegates
- James Price Dillard, professor of communication
- James Dillard, first officer of American Airlines Flight 191
- Jim Dillard (gridiron football) (1938–2022), American football player
