= Becky Branch Falls =

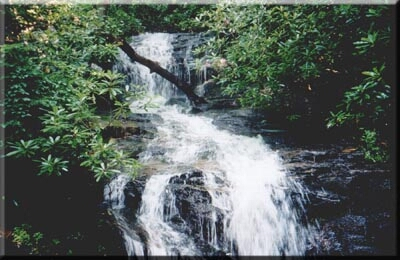
- Interactive map of Becky Branch Falls
- Location: Rabun County, Georgia, United States
- Coordinates: 34.883333°N 83.35°W
- Type: Cascade
- Total height: 20 feet (6.1 m)
- Watercourse: Becky Branch Creek

Becky Branch Falls is a twenty-foot waterfall located in Rabun County, Georgia. The waterfall is located on the Bartram Trail (designated as a National Scenic Trail in Georgia) in a valley called Warwoman Dell, east of Clayton, Georgia. In addition to accessing the falls via the Bartram Trail at the point where the trail crosses Warwoman Road, there is a short 0.6 mile loop trail called Becky Branch Falls Trail. This alternative trail connects is also accessed at the point where the Bartram Trail crosses Warwoman Road. The Bartram Trail also continues to nearby Martin Creek Falls. Becky Branch Falls is located within the boundaries of the Chattooga River Ranger District of the Chattahoochee National Forest.
