= Margaret Dillard =

Native American artist and painter

Margaret A. Dillard is a Native American artist, painter, and member of the Chickasaw Nation.

== Life and education ==
Margaret Dillard was born and raised in Oklahoma. She is a member of the Chickasaw Nation. She completed an associate degree in art at Rose State College, attended the University of Science and Arts of Oklahoma for fine and studio arts (from 1981 to 1982), and completed a bachelor's degree the University of Central Oklahoma. During the course of her adult life and artistic career, Dillard has worked to reconnect with her Chickasaw heritage.

== Art career ==
Dillard focuses on naturalistic, representational portraits in oil and acrylics. She also makes work that is inspired by her Christian faith. Though predominantly a figurative painter, Dillard also creates works in small, hanging sculptures.

Dillard's work was exhibited at the Chickasaw Nation Welcome Center in 2016, in conjunction with an exhibition of the work by Muscogee (Creek) Nation member Danny Beaver. In 2019, Dillard was highlighted in the Thrive Traditions series on Chickasaw TV. In 2019, she won third place for a painting titled "Jannie's Boy" at the Artesian Arts Festival in Sulphur, Oklahoma.
