= Dillard House =

Restaurant in Georgia, USA

Coordinates: 34.966598°N 83.383737°W

The Dillard House

The Dillard House is a restaurant in Dillard, Georgia, known for its "family style" menu and Southern cooking. It traces its origins to the 1910s, when A. J. Dillard, a descendant of John Dillard, and his wife Carrie opened their stone house to boarders. With the improvement of local transportation infrastructure after World War II, it evolved into a major tourist attraction. Since 1954, it has expanded its dining facilities and added a hotel, cottages, petting zoo, and other attractions. The New York Times wrote in 1983, "[T]he Dillards dug themselves into the land, hung on through good times and bad, and in time turned homecooking and mountain hospitality ... into a big business."

The restaurant and resort, which sit in a town of about 200 people, claims to serve about 800 customers on an average day and up to 3,000 a day during peak season. Patrons have included Thomas Edison, Henry Ford, Lady Bird Johnson, Walt Disney, and Jimmy Carter.

The original stone house was nominated for inclusion in the National Register of Historic Places in 2007.

== Restaurant ==
The Dillard House is an all-you-can-eat, one-menu, waiter-served buffet, also called "family style." The day's menu is placed on the board just inside the restaurant. The staff brings every dish on the menu to the table, and that table can eat as much as they want, and ask for more of any dish. The food is Southern and Appalachian with apple butter, acorn squash soufflé, and country ham among the notable house specialties.

The Dillard House Cookbook and Mountain Guide was released by Longtree Press in 1996.

== Motel ==
The Dillard House also features a motel, cottages, petting zoo, stables, fishing, chalets, and rooms in the original stone Dillard House, now called the Oaklawn Inn. It is a popular destination for leaf watchers drawn to the area's abundant foliage and sometimes brilliant colors seen shortly before the deciduous trees begin to lose their leaves. The restaurant claims to serve up to 3,000 customers a day during October.

== Other versions ==
In the late 1970s through the late 1980s, the Dillard House Jr. was located in a building on Georgia Highway 441 next to Jim Dillard's Best Western motel. It served food similar to the original Dillard House, along with standard American food like hamburgers and steaks. Orders were placed by the individual, and did not feature the one-menu approach of the original Dillard House.
