= Martin Creek Falls =

Series of waterfalls in Rabun County, Georgia

Coordinates: 34°53′36.1″N 83°20′57.5″W

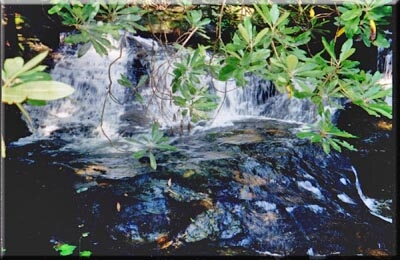
One of the smaller waterfalls of Martin Creek Falls

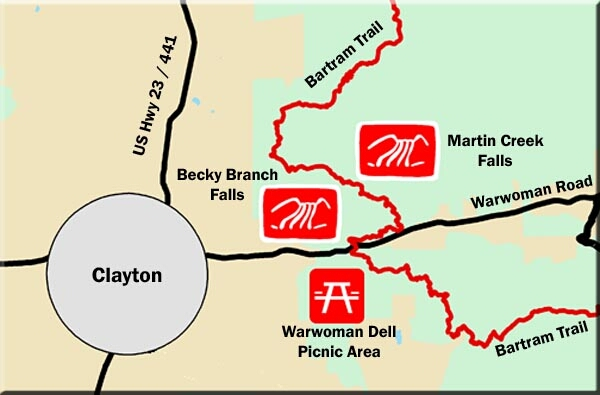
Map showing Martin Creek Falls

Martin Creek Falls is a series of waterfalls located in Rabun County, Georgia, with the largest drop being about 30 feet. They are located on the Bartram Trail which is a National Recreational Trail in Georgia. The falls are east of Clayton, Georgia and can be accessed by taking the Bartram Trail where it crosses Warwoman Road. The trail passes Becky Branch Falls at 200 yards and then continues on for a difficult 1.8 miles to Martin Creek Falls. Martin Creek Falls are in the Chattooga River Ranger District of the Chattahoochee National Forest.
