= Dudley Dillard =

Dudley Dillard (October 18, 1913 – August 28, 1991) was an economist and a professor at the University of Maryland from 1942 until his retirement in 1984. Dillard was born in Ontario, Oregon, and graduated from the University of California at Berkeley with a Bachelor of Science in economics in 1935 and a Doctor of Philosophy in Economics in 1940. In 1948, he published The Economics of John Maynard Keynes, which was translated into several languages. Dillard was the recipient of the Veblen-Commons Award in 1986, and served as vice president of the History of Economics Society. He was also a former chairman of the United States Executive Board of the American College in Paris. He is survived by his wife Louisa Gardner, whom he had been married to for 52 years at the time of his death. Professor Dillard is also survived by a daughter, Lorraine Dillard Gray, an educator who taught at Bethesda Elementary School in Bethesda, Maryland. Professor Dillard has one grandson William Dillard Gray, who is a librarian.

== Career ==
After working briefly at the University of Colorado and the University of Delaware, Dudley joined the faculty at the University of Maryland in 1942. He wrote articles on various economists including John Maynard Keynes, Pierre-Joseph Proudhon, David Ricardo, and Silvio Gesell, and was encouraged to write a book on Keynes. Dudley produced a draft in 1943. They then took a two-year leave of absence and spent it at Columbia University, where Dudley discussed the role of money in capitalism with various economists, including Karl Polanyi. Dudley's book on Keynes, The Economics of John Maynard Keynes was published in 1948 and became a standard text for graduate students in macroeconomics, translated into several languages. Even years later, during his Fulbright lecture tour in India, Dillard's work on Keynes was still highly regarded and widely taught.

Dillard wrote The Economic Development of the North Atlantic Community. Dillard's description of the process of cumulative causation differs from the view that economic development results from the choices made by rational actors. Instead, Dillard argues that this process is driven by a series of actions and reactions that are subject to correction, but not solely determined by individual choices that are aggregated together.

Dillard's later career focused on two interrelated themes. The first concerns the tension that arises between the development of economic concepts and the evolution of the economy itself. The second pertains to the conflicting nature of the capitalist economic system, which experiences tremendous growth in productivity but is inadequately linked to monetary and financial institutions that can lead to economic downturns and inflation, causing societal disruption. He served the Eastern Economic Association as a member and as a member of its executive board and as its president for the 1987–88 academic years.
