= Victor Dillard =

French Jesuit

- Born: 1897; Blois, France
- Died: 1945; Dachau concentration camp
- Known for: French Resistance in WWII

Victor Dillard (1897–1945) was a French Jesuit and a hero of the French Resistance during World War II. He attempted to organize the French compulsory workers deported to Germany, but was arrested and died in Dachau.

Victor Dillard came from a bourgeois family from Blois, to a family of ten children, including Robert Dillard (1889-1968, polytechnician, student at the naval school, future rear admiral), Pierre Dillars (1891-1915, died for France, studied at the naval school like his brother). Another of his brothers, Étienne Dillard, is the father of the singer Françoise Hardy.

On December 13, 2025, he was beatified by Pope Leo XIV at Notre-Dame de Paris as one of the 50 French Martyrs of World War II, in which he was declared Blessed.

== Works ==
- Victor Dillard, Lettres du prisonnier inconnu, Sainte-Foy-lès-Lyon, Le monde ouvrier, 1941
- Victor Dillard, Suprêmes témoignages, Paris, Spes, coll. « Action populaire », 1945
