= Wayah Bald =

Open area in North Carolina, US

Coordinates: 35°10′49.7″N 83°33′38.75″W

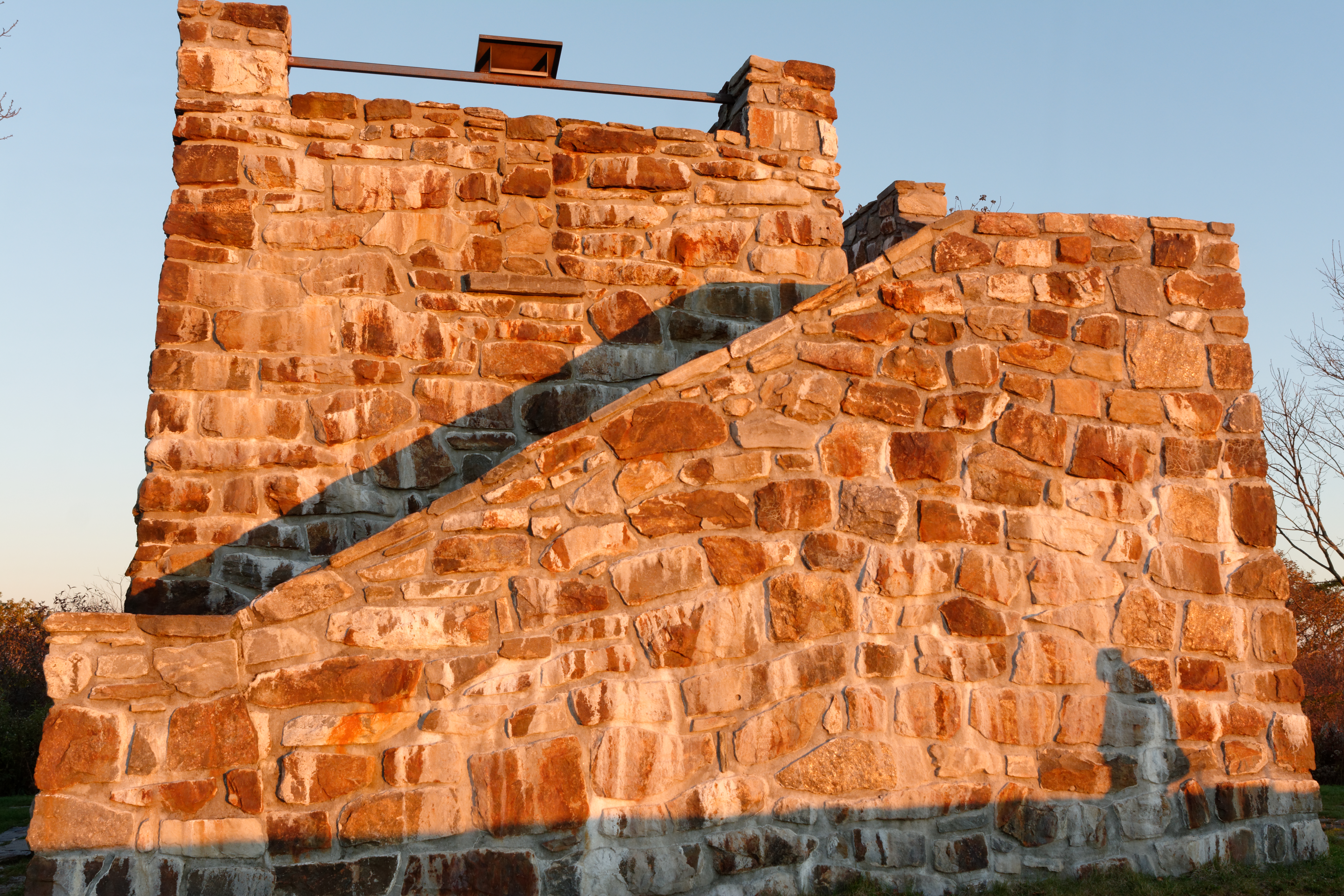
Eastern side of the observation tower at sunrise

Wayah Bald is a high-altitude treeless open area in Nantahala National Forest, near Franklin, North Carolina. The Wayah Bald Observation Tower is located at the area's highest point (5,385 feet); the stone observation tower was built by the Civilian Conservation Corps in 1937 for fire detection. The Appalachian Trail and Bartram Trail cross at Wayah Bald.

Wayah Bald is a popular destination for hikers, especially during spring, when the rhododendron and azaleas are in bloom.

== History ==
Wayah Bald received its name from the Cherokee natives. It was named "Waya", the Cherokee word for wolf, after the red wolves that once inhabited the area. Spear points found on the bald indicate that indigenous people used the area as hunting grounds more than eleven thousand years ago.

== Damage and repair ==
In 2009 and 2010, the Forest Service restored the north face of the tower using about $75,000. The tower's north wall was breaking down and the stones were removed and new concrete was used to repair the wall and reset the stones.

In 2016, the tower was damaged by wildfires, leaving only the stone base. After this, it was temporarily closed to the public and reopened in 2018. Effort was made to restore the wooden top of the tower as accurately as possible.

== Photos ==
Observation tower at the top of Wayah Bald, late December 2007

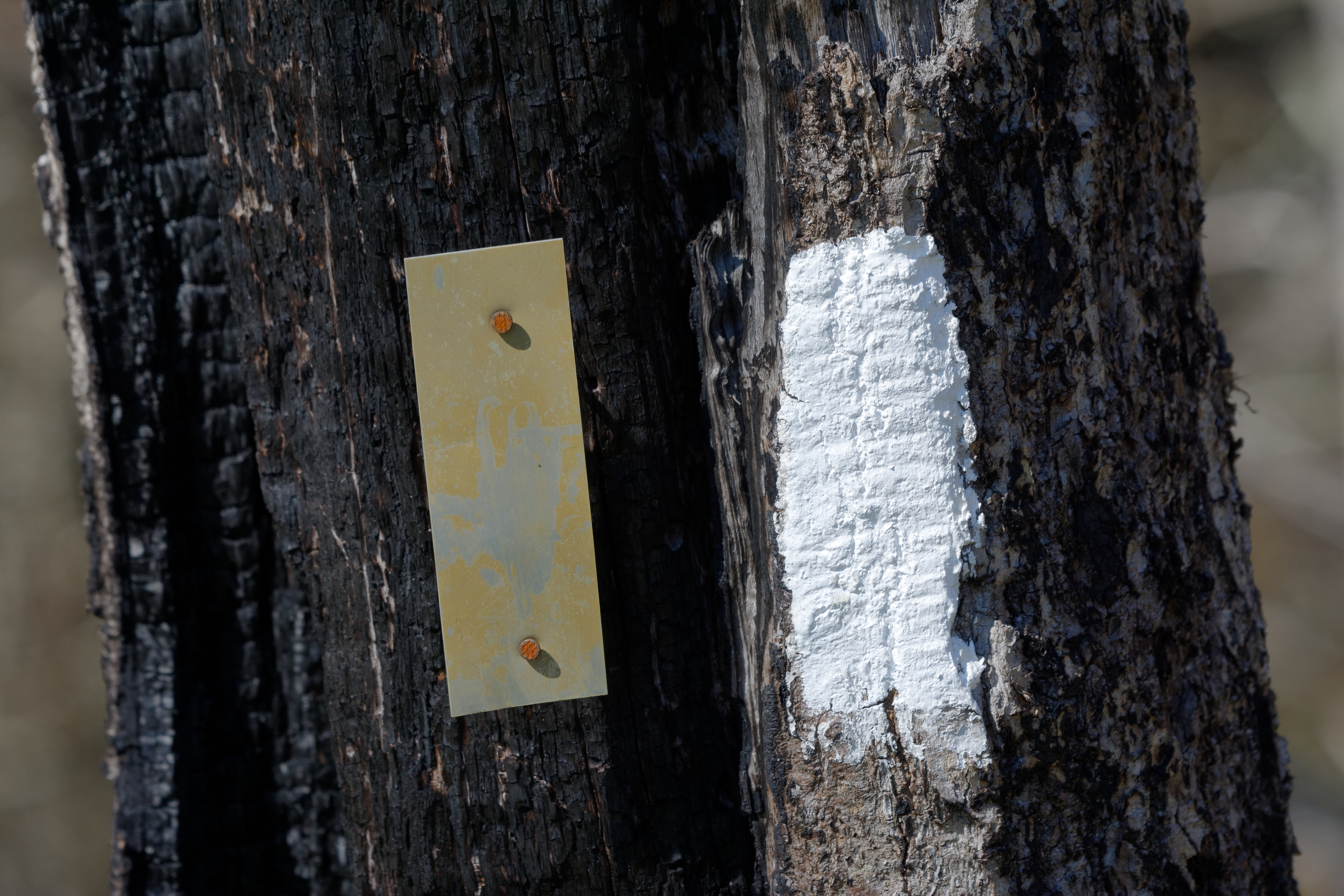
Trail markers where the Appalachian Trail and Bartram Trail meet

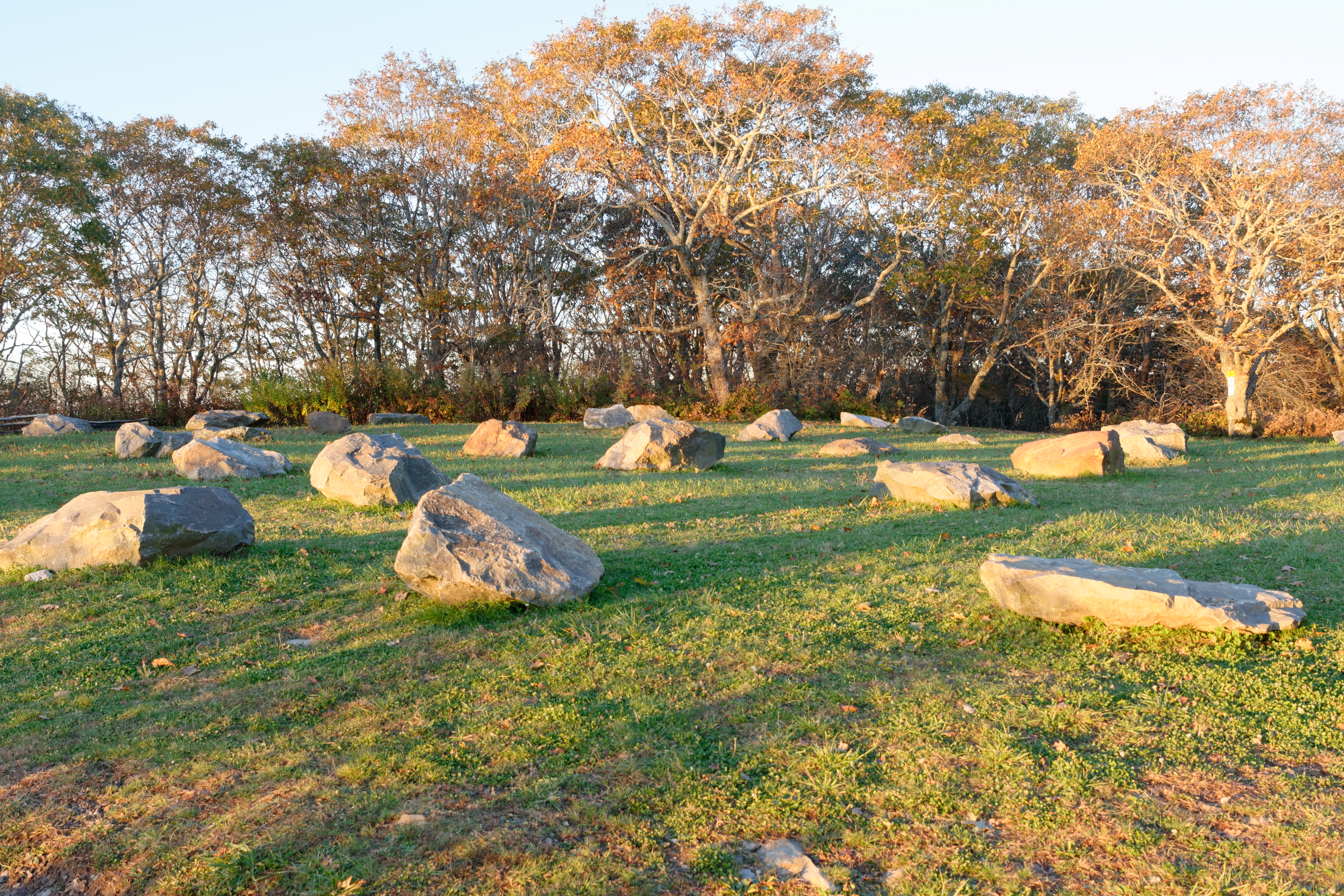
Rocks atop Wayah Bald, just after sunrise

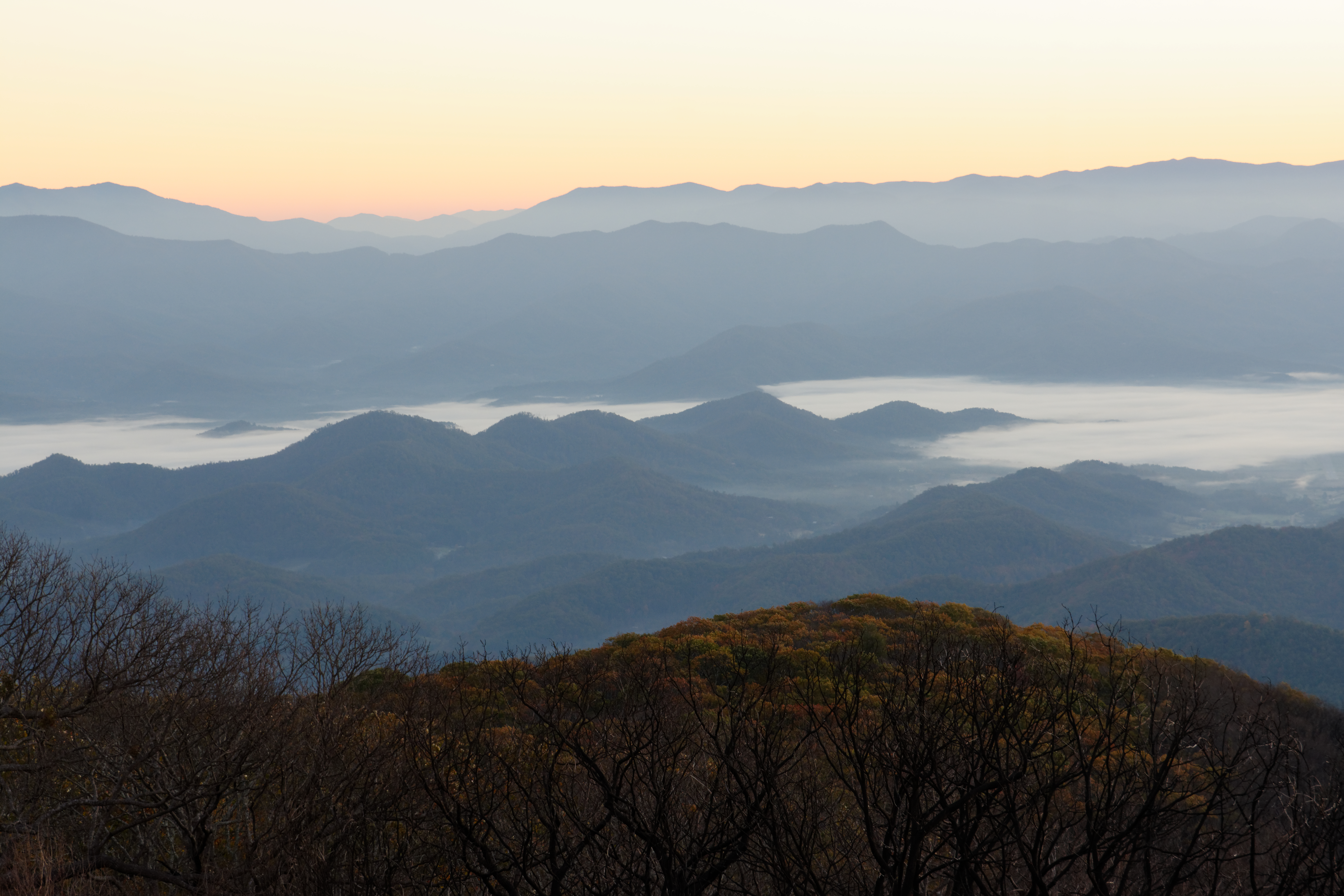
View to the east just before sunrise

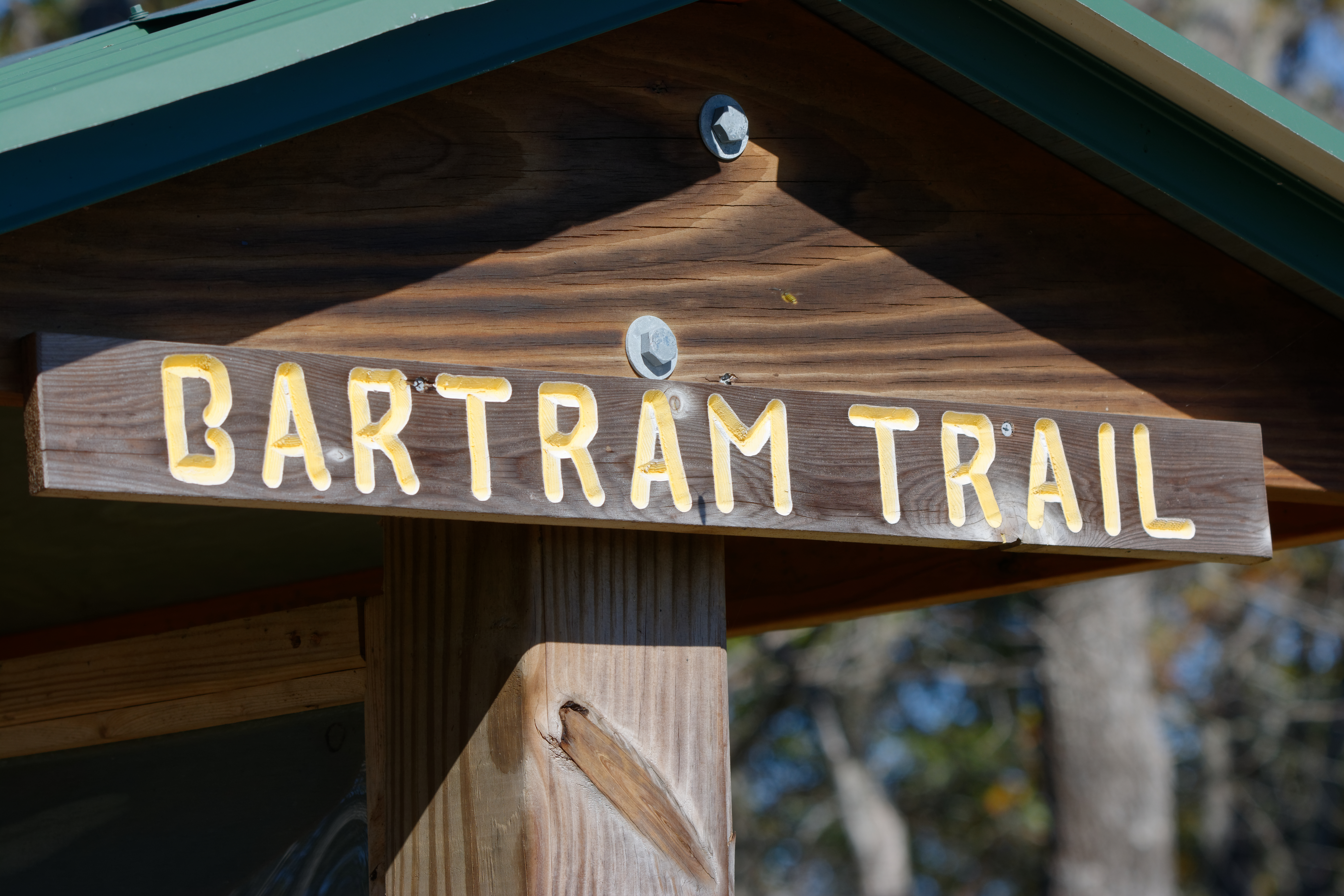
Sign for the Baltram Trail

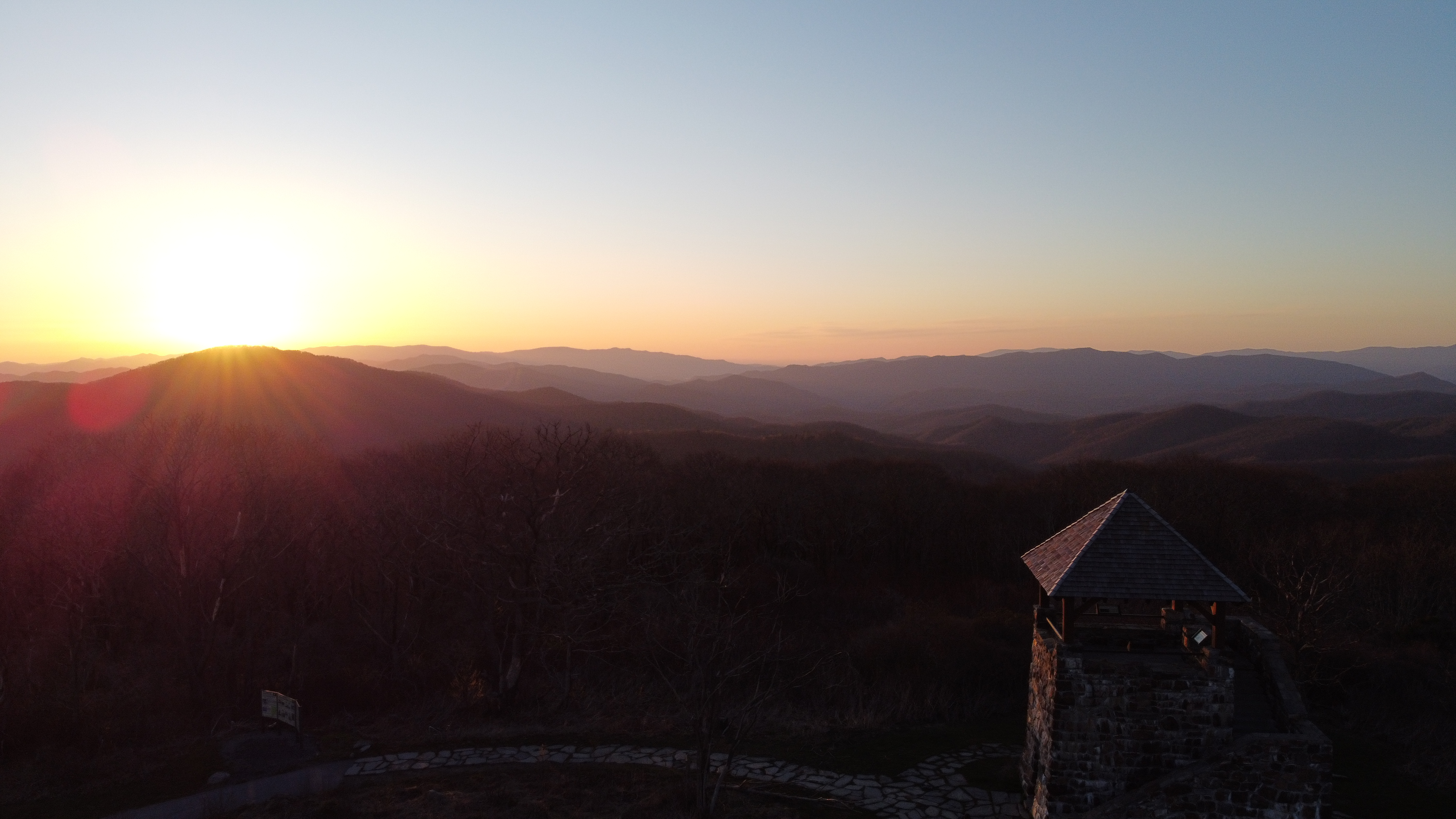
Sunset over Wayah Bald
