= Rabun Bald =

Mountain in Georgia, United States

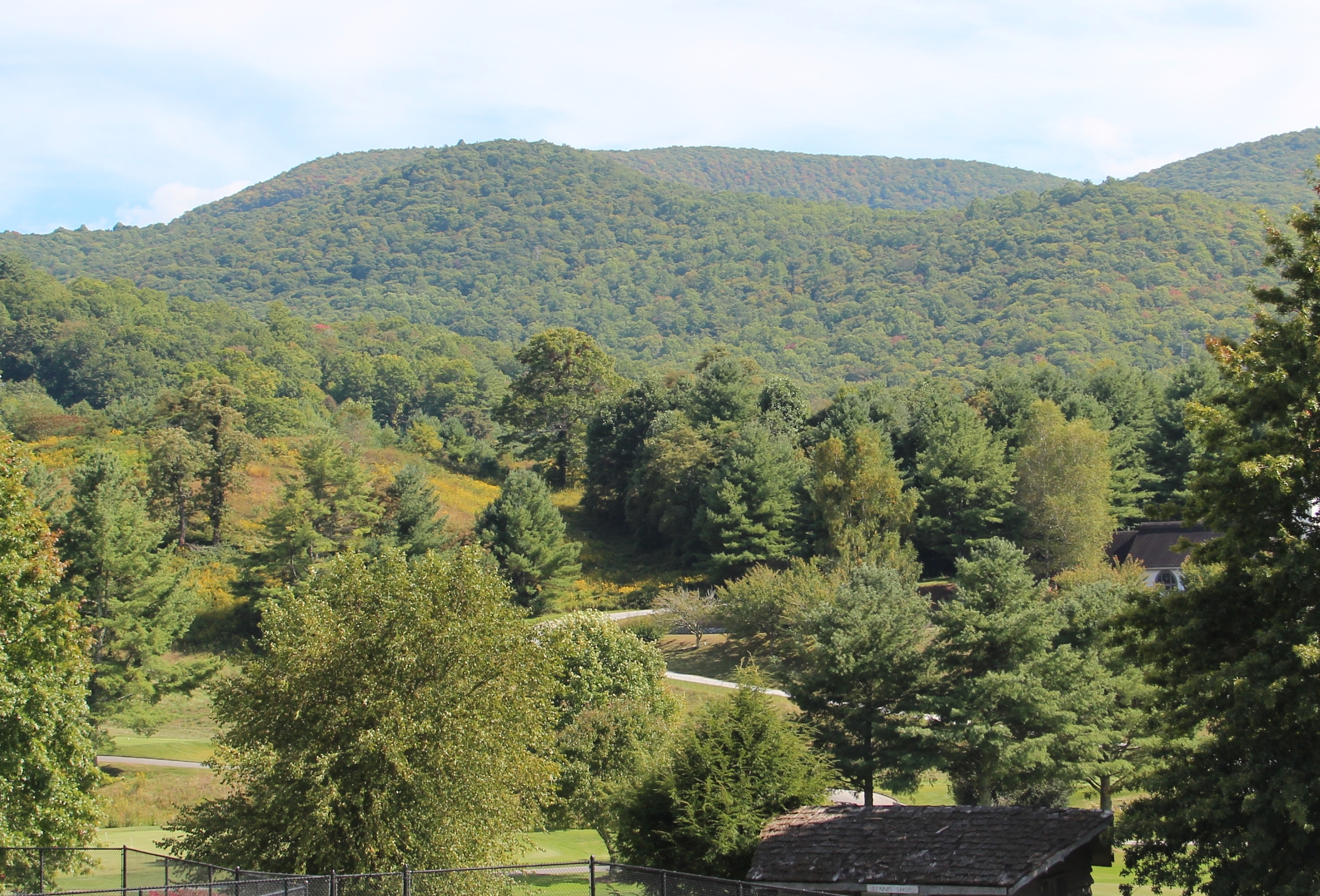
- Rabun Bald viewed from Sky Valley, Georgia

Highest point
- Elevation: 4,696 ft (1,431 m)
- Prominence: 1,016 ft (310 m)
- Coordinates: 34°57′56″N 83°18′00″W

Geography
- Location within Georgia
- Location: Sky Valley, Georgia, Georgia, U.S.
- Parent range: Blue Ridge Mountains
- Topo map: USGS Rabun Bald

Climbing
- Easiest route: Bartram Trail

Rabun Bald, with an elevation of 4,696 feet (1,431 m), is the second-highest peak in the U.S. state of Georgia; only Brasstown Bald 4,784 feet (1,458 m) is higher. It is immediately southeast of Sky Valley, Georgia, and is the tallest mountain in the county. An observation tower on the summit provides hikers with views that, on clear days, extend for more than 100 miles (160 km). The hike to the top of Rabun Bald is 5.8 miles (9.3 km) round trip via the Rabun Bald Trail. The Rabun Bald Trail connects with the Bartram Trail system, which passes over the top as it winds through northeast Georgia for 37 miles (60 km).

According to Native American legend, Rabun Bald is inhabited by fire-breathing demon people: some campers still report hearing strange sounds throughout the night.

Rabun Bald was the site of the first fire tower in the area, which was constructed by Nick Nicholson, the first forest ranger in Georgia. The fire tower was operated by the United States Forest Service until the early 1970s. After the fire tower was taken out of service, a Youth Conservation Corps (YCC) crew dismantled the tower's uppermost component, a metal-framed enclosure with glass windows that sat atop a stone base. Leaving the stone base intact, the YCC crew replaced the metal "cabin" with a railed wooden observation platform.

== Gallery ==
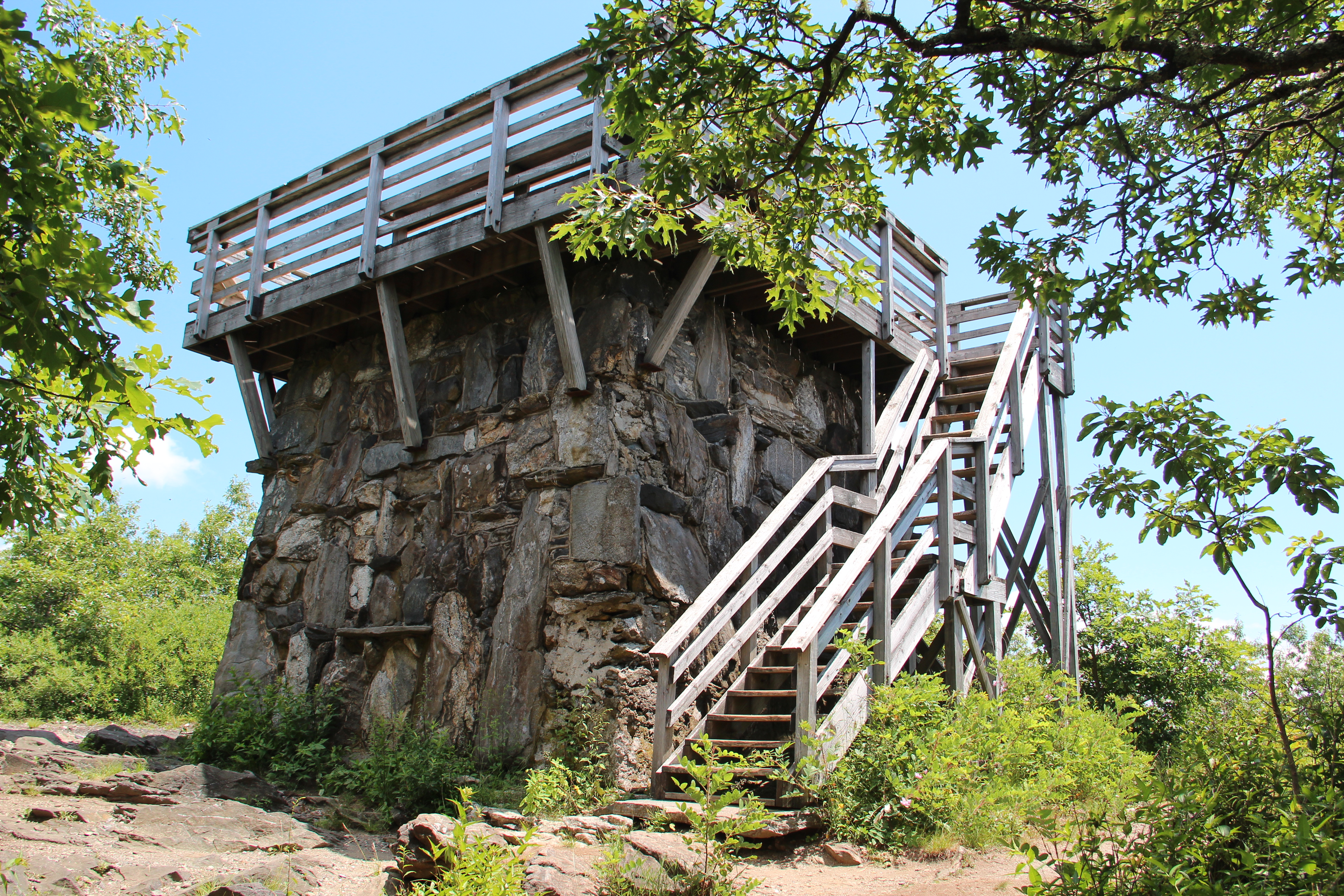
Fire tower on Rabun Bald's summit

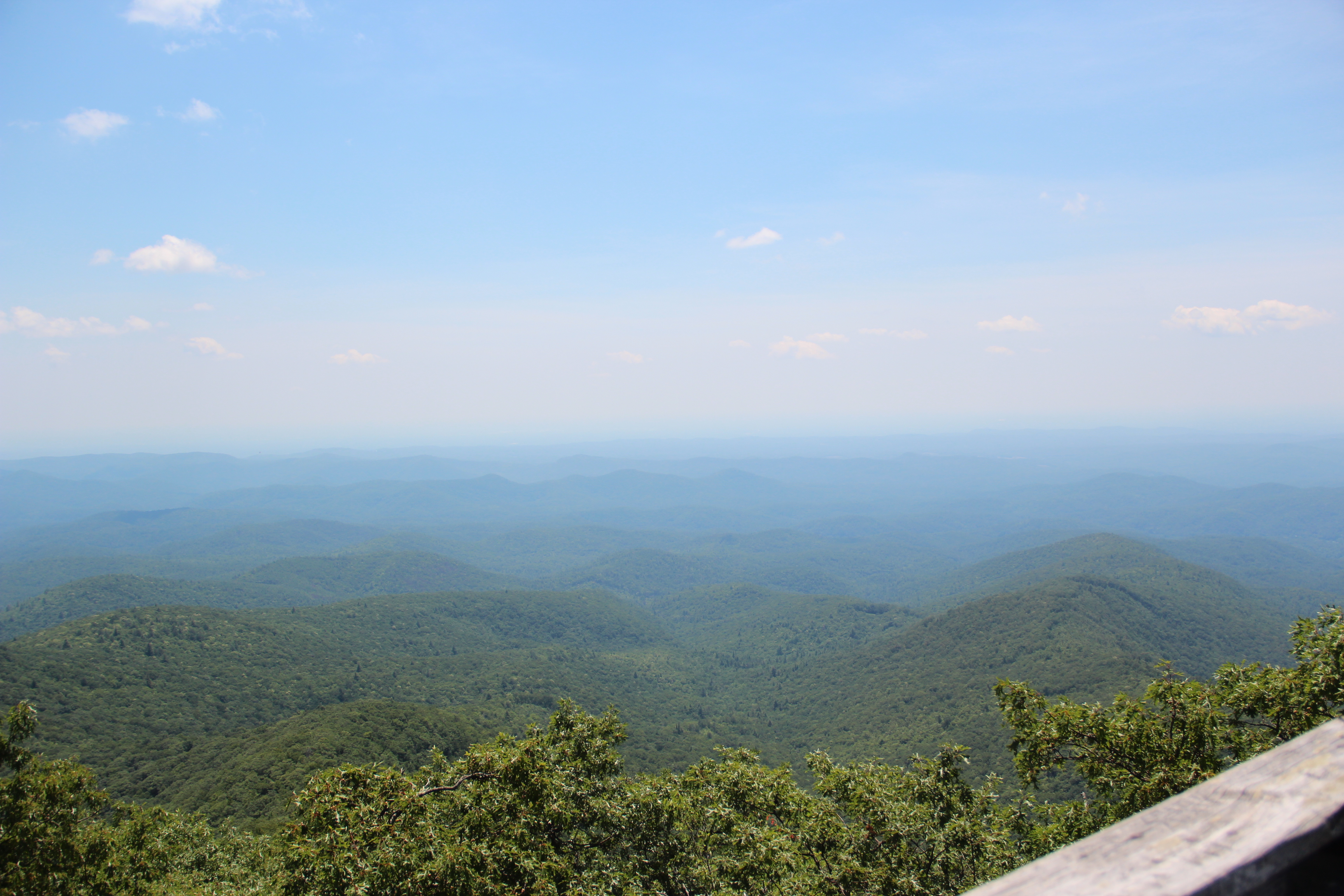
View from Rabun Bald's fire tower, looking south

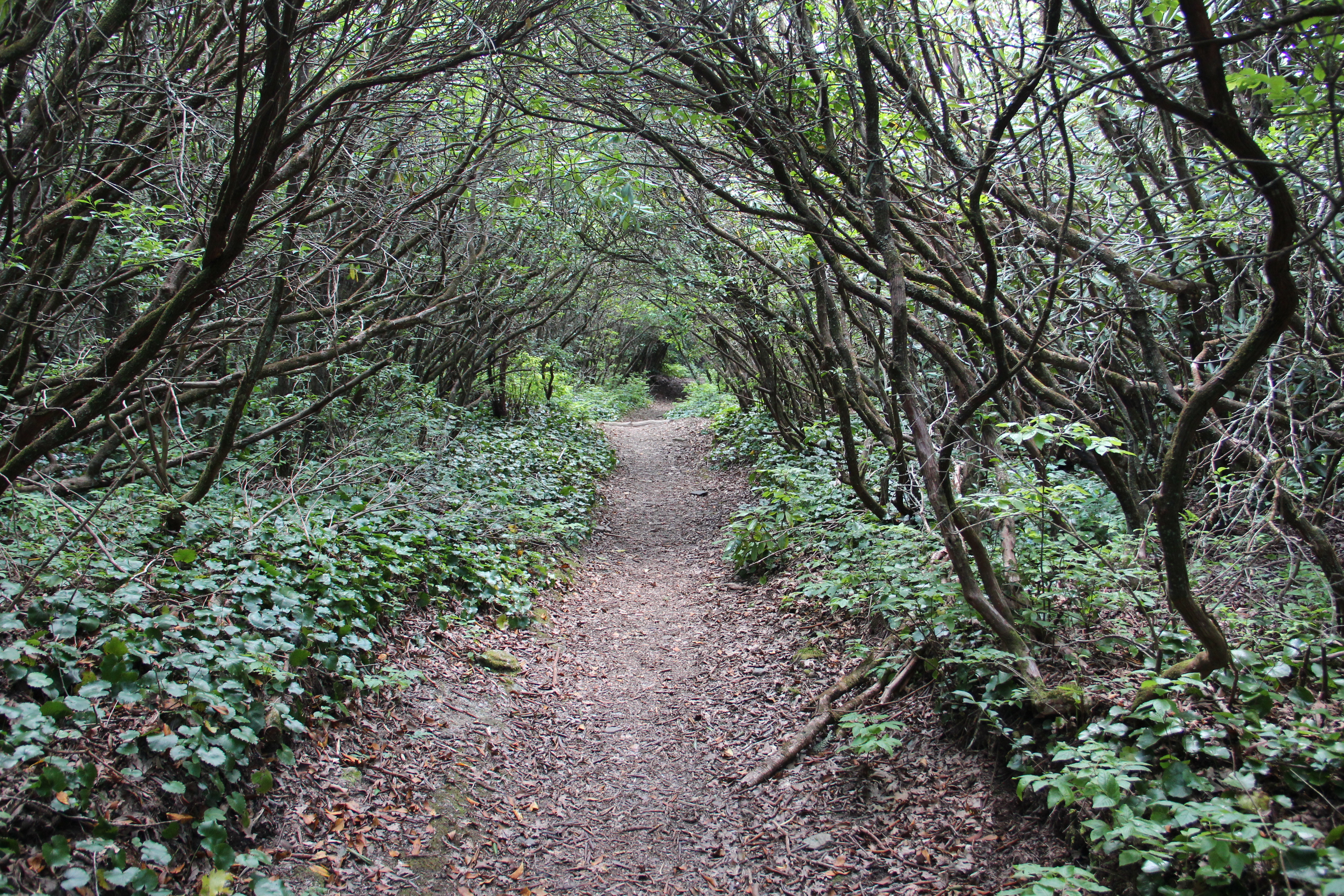
Bartram Trail on Rabun Bald

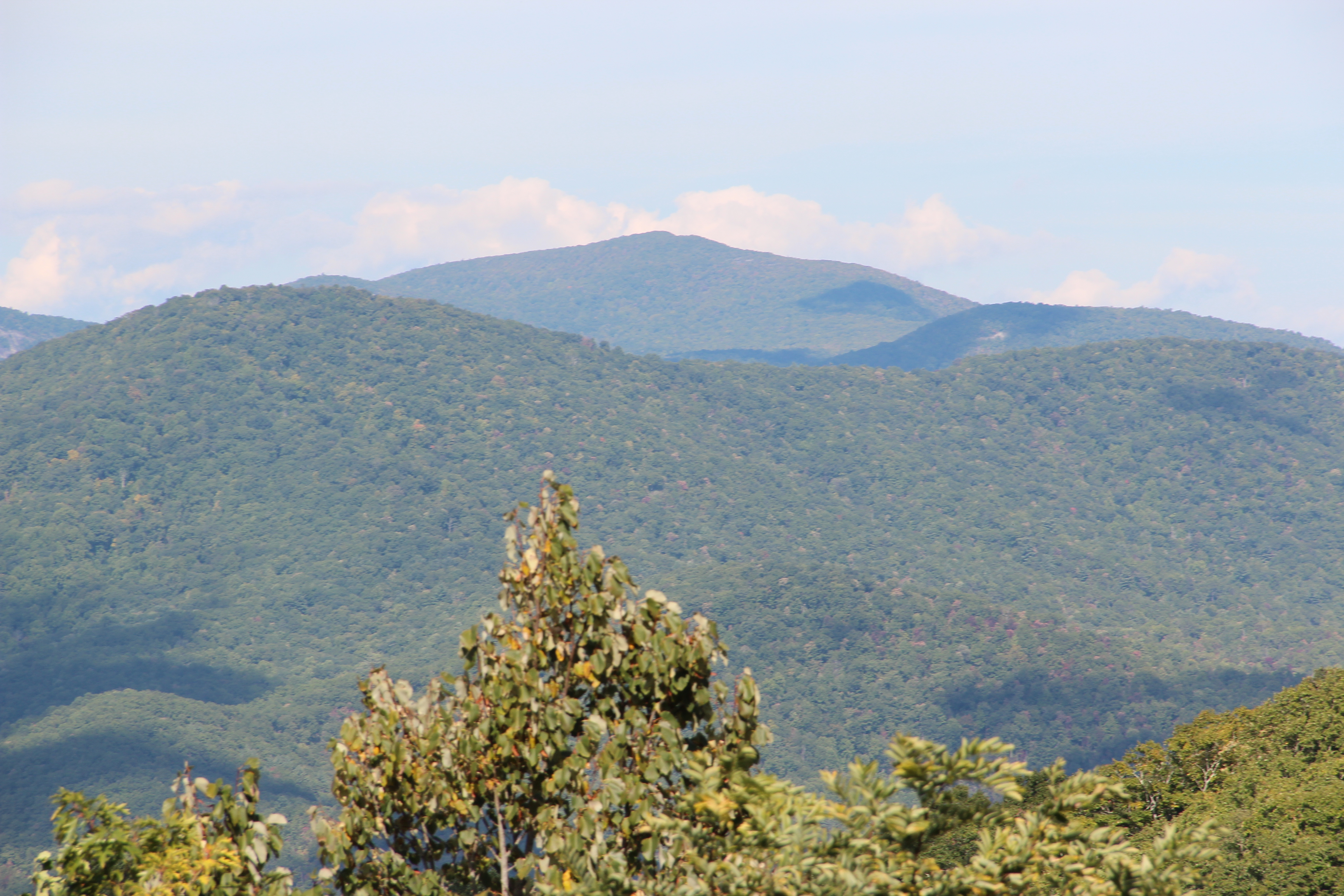
Rabun Bald seen from Black Rock Mountain State Park

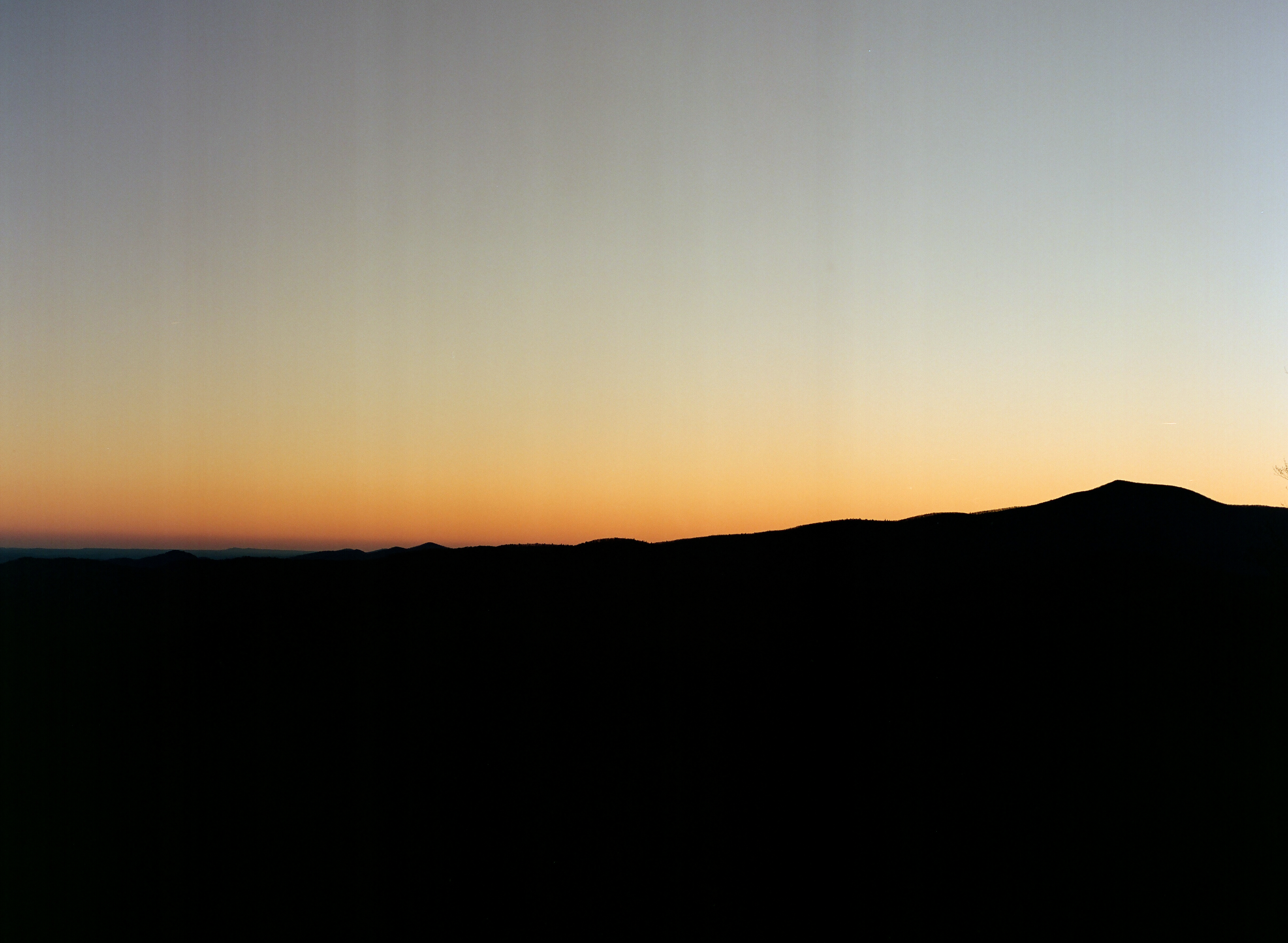
Rabun Bald viewed from North Carolina

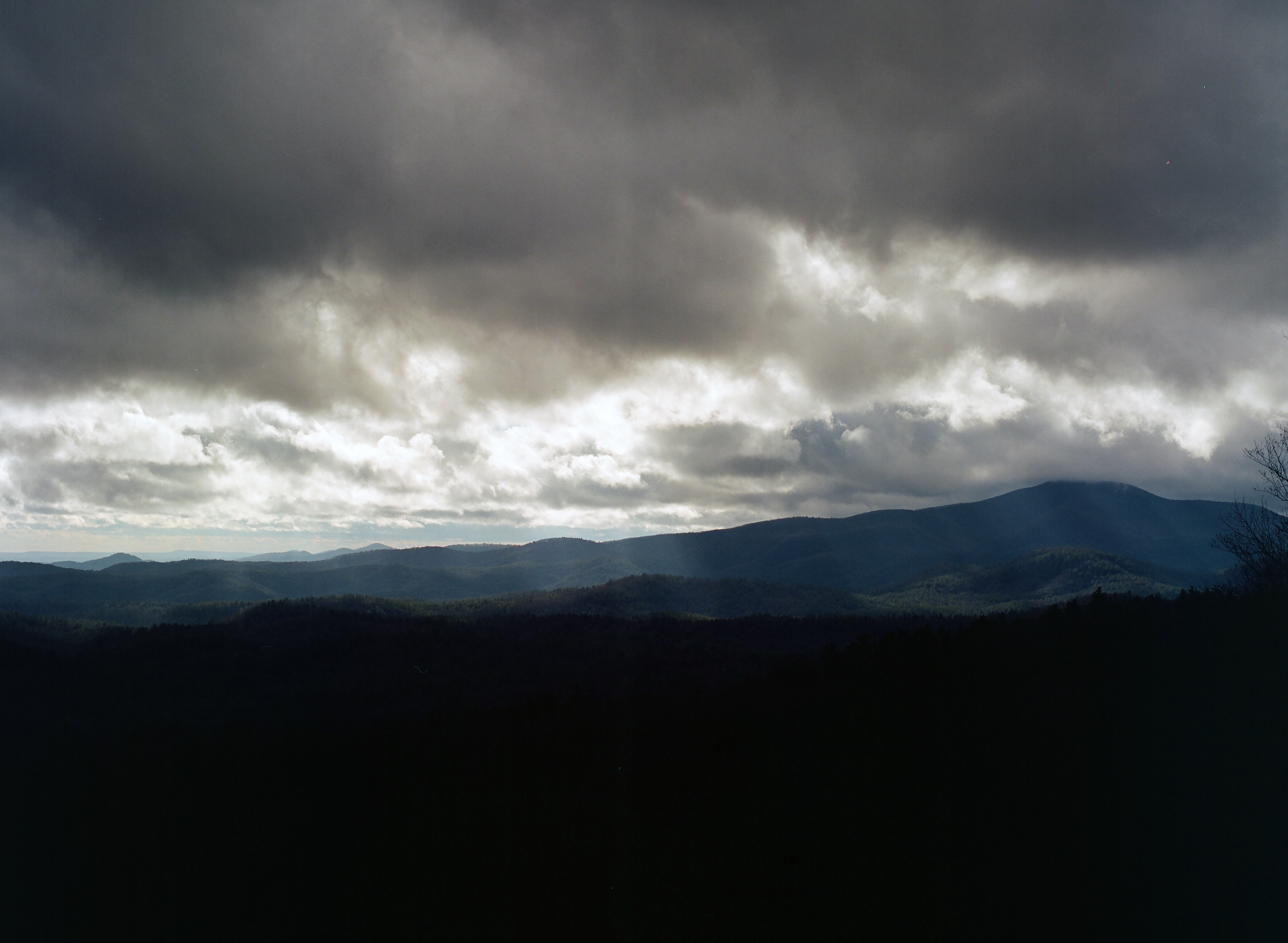
View of Rabun Bald in January in the afternoon

== See also ==
- List of mountains in Georgia (U.S. state)
