= John Dillard =

American soldier and settler (1760–1842)

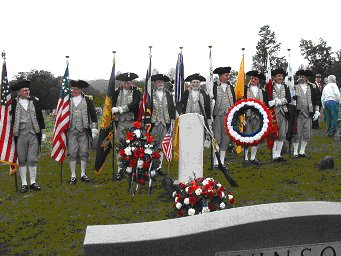
- Grave of John Dillard in Dillard, GA with Re-Enactors
- Born: 1760; Culpeper County, Virginia
- Died: 1842 (aged 81–82); Rabun County, Georgia
- Occupations: soldier, settler, commissioner
- Known for: Establishing Buncombe County, NC and Dillard, GA; Revolutionary Soldier

John Dillard (August 12, 1760 – June 5, 1842) was an American soldier and pioneer settler, and a prominent figure in the establishment of Buncombe County, North Carolina and Dillard, Georgia.

Dillard was born in Culpeper County, Virginia and served in the American Revolution, achieving the rank of lieutenant. A later resident of Pittsylvania County, Virginia, he participated in the Battle of Guilford Court House. Dillard's ancestor George Dillard had arrived from England to Jamestown, Virginia, in 1650. John Dillard resided in Buncombe County, North Carolina, for some 33 years where he was active in the formation of the county and the selection of its county seat of Asheville.

In 1780, the General Assembly of North Carolina enacted a statute granting 3,000 acres (12 km^{2}) of vacant land "not fit for cultivation" for iron works as a bounty from the State to any persons who "would build and carry on the same". At the October term of court in 1792, John Dillard and others were ordered by the court to be on a jury to view a piece of land "entered by Robert Love and William Trodway" to erect iron works and report thereon agreeably to the act of the Assembly.

At the April, 1792 term of court it was ordered that a jury consisting of John Dillard and others view and lay off a road from the Wagon Ford of Rims Creek to join the road from the Turkey Cove to Robert Hunters on Lindsay Creek of Cane River, the most advantageous and best according to law, "which jury is to meet the fourth Monday of May at John Dillard's; William Brittain (who was an adjoining property owner of John Dillard) to attend and qualify said jury who are to report to July court."

In December, 1792 and April 1793, John Dillard was a Commissioner in a local political dispute of determining where the county seat of Buncombe County should be located. It was provided in an act creating Buncombe County that a committee of five persons be appointed for the selection of the site. A dispute arose between two factions of Buncombe County residents on opposite sides of the Swannanoa River, one faction pressing for the county seat to be north of Swannanoa, which is now the center of Asheville, and the other faction demanding it to be at a place south of Swannanoa River which later became known as the "Steam Saw Mill Place" and which is now the southern part of the City of Asheville.

The state of Georgia acquired from the Cherokee Indians by treaty about 1819 what is now Rabun County, Georgia, and sold it by state lottery. John Dillard's youngest son, James Dillard, purchased 1,000 acres (4.0 km^{2}) from Georgia state lottery holders and settled about 1823 in the northeast corner of Georgia in what would later become Rabun County, Georgia and the Town of Dillard. John Dillard accompanied his son in settling in the area, becoming one of the earliest settlers in that part of Georgia. John Dillard died and is buried in Dillard, Georgia.

John Dillard's descendants became prominent in and today reside in the Rabun County town of Dillard, Georgia which is named for the family. Various branches of Dillard descendants have operated since the Civil War lodging facilities under the name of the "Dillard House." One branch of his descendants still operates the Dillard House, a well known southern family style restaurant and conference center.
