= Sky Valley, Georgia =

City in Georgia, United States

- City
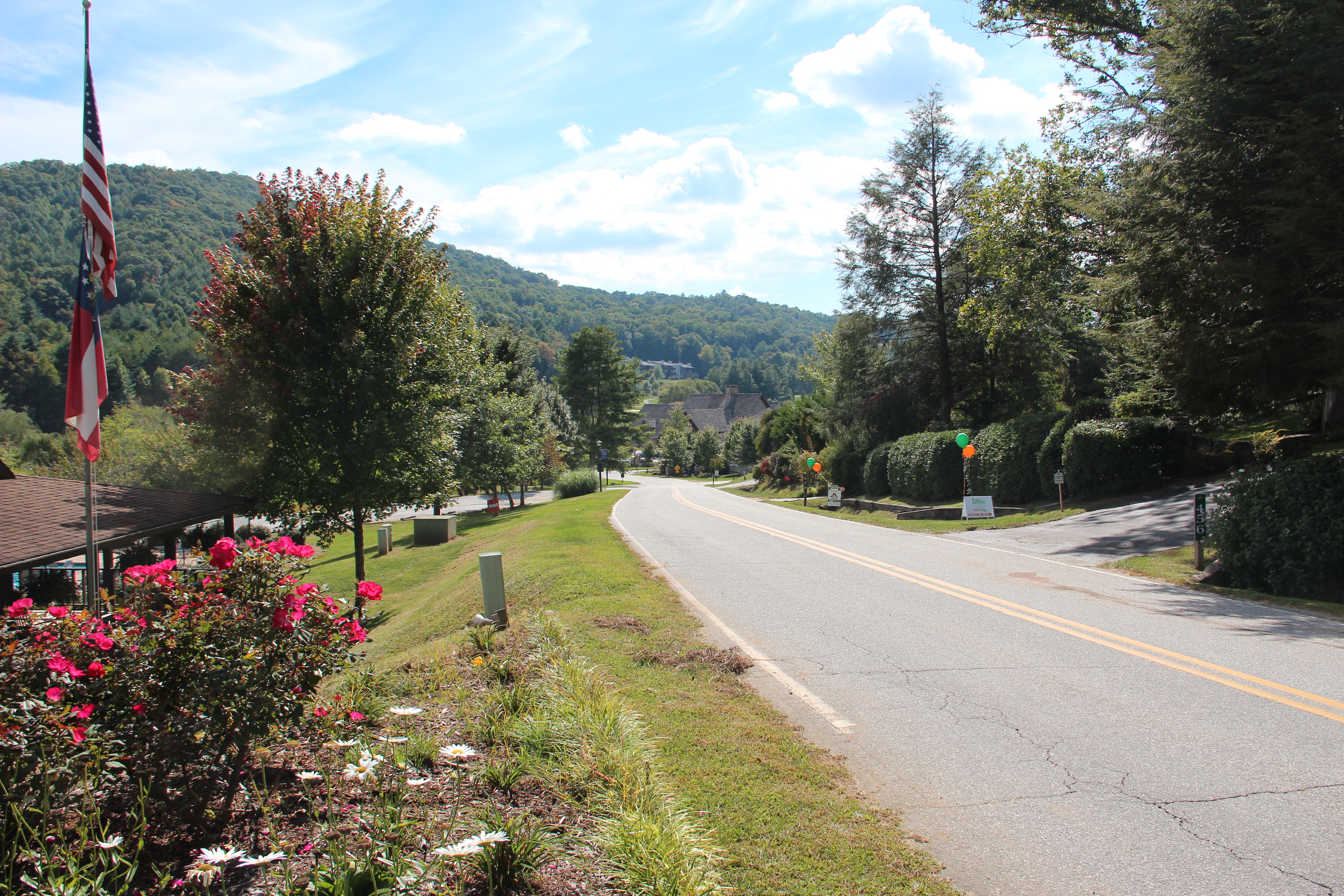
- Street in Sky Valley

- Seal

- Location in Rabun County and the state of Georgia
- Coordinates: 34°59′03″N 83°19′53″W
- Country: United States
- State: Georgia
- County: Rabun

Government
  - Mayor: Benita Cotton-Orr

Area
  - Total: 3.07 sq mi (7.94 km^{2})
  - Land: 3.04 sq mi (7.87 km^{2})
  - Water: 0.031 sq mi (0.08 km^{2})
- Elevation: 3,500 ft (1,100 m)

Population (2020)
  - Total: 482
  - Density: 158.7/sq mi (61.28/km^{2})
- Time zone: UTC-5 (Eastern (EST))
  - Summer (DST): UTC-4 (EDT)
- ZIP code: 30537
- Area code: 706
- FIPS code: 13-71282
- GNIS feature ID: 2405468
- Website: skyvalleyga.com

Sky Valley is a city in Rabun County, Georgia, United States and is nestled in a mountain valley on the northwest slopes of Rabun Bald, Georgia's second-highest peak. Incorporated in March 1978, it recorded a total population of 250 as of the 2000 U.S. census, and 482 as of 2020. Sky Valley shares ZIP code 30537 with nearby Dillard.

Since 1969, it is home to Sky Valley Resort (now renamed Sky Valley Country Club), which features championship golf, championship croquet, tennis, and swimming, and formerly downhill skiing.

== Ski area ==
The resort formerly had the only winter ski area in Georgia, but after changing ownership in 2004, the resort's ski slopes were permanently closed after 35 years.

The former ski lodge at 696 Sky Valley Way now houses a church under its two unique eight-gabled roofs, while the chairlift house and equipment-rental shop were demolished in January 2007. To the immediate south of this, condos were built on the north-facing slope which previously had the five ski runs, named Panorama, Scooter, Kamikaze, Gravity's Revenge, and Pokey, the last of which was the bunny slope for children with its own rope tow. These provided 15–16 acres (6.1–6.5 ha) of skiable terrain with a vertical drop of 210 feet (64 m).

Only two other aerial lifts remain in Georgia: the Summit Skyride tram to the top of Stone Mountain, and the chairlift across Lake Winnepesaukah, an amusement park even closer to Georgia's northern state line in Rossville, a suburb adjoining Chattanooga, Tennessee.

After the closures of Sky Valley's ski operations and Ski Scaly, Sapphire Valley is the nearest ski area, while Cloudmont in far northeast Alabama remains the southernmost in the eastern U.S. since 1970, beating Sky Valley after only a year. Four western ski areas go as far south as the latitude of middle Georgia, while Mexico's only ski area is slightly further south than Miami.

== Transportation ==
The only highway or other significant through-road is the Dillard/Highlands Road (Georgia 246 and N.C. 106) between Dillard, Georgia and Highlands, North Carolina. The northern city limit is the North Carolina state line, where the highway zigzags, crossing in five different places (two of which are into and out of the city). Due to surveying errors more than 200 years ago, the boundary is considerably further south than the 35°N specified at the time by Congress.

Because of this, the main road into Sky Valley from the highway is actually within the community of Scaly Mountain, North Carolina, which also had a ski area that closed in 2004 but offers snow tubing each winter since then. Beginning at a small intersection that is bisected by exactly 35°N, Old Mud Creek Road travels south and becomes Bald Mountain Road at the state line, then curving east as the city's main street (though there is no downtown or business district per se) and eventually ending at Hale Ridge Road just south of the state line.

The main entrance was originally to be a new road from Ga. 246 instead of N.C. 106, however GDOT denied this for safety reasons. Around 1980, a covered bridge was built along the highway for this entrance, but was never used, and still stands as of 2019.

== Geography and climate ==
Sky Valley is the northernmost city in the state.

According to the United States Census Bureau, the city has a total area of 3.0 square miles (7.8 km^{2}), all land. The elevation of the valley floor is approximately 3100 feet above sea level, while areas within the city limits on the slopes of Rabun Bald exceed 4200 feet. Sky Valley is Georgia's highest incorporated city and one of the highest municipalities in the eastern United States.

Under the Köppen climate classification, Sky Valley has a temperate subtropical highland climate (Köppen Cfb), a rarity in the southeastern US, due to its high elevation. The city is also one of the coldest locations in Georgia with the January average temperature 34.0 °F (1.1 °C) and the July average temperature of 69.0 °F (20.6 °C).

Climate data for Sky Valley
Month	Jan	Feb	Mar	Apr	May	Jun	Jul	Aug	Sep	Oct	Nov	Dec	Year
Mean daily maximum °F (°C)	45.0 (7.2)	48.4 (9.1)	56.5 (13.6)	65.1 (18.4)	72.0 (22.2)	77.4 (25.2)	79.9 (26.6)	79.0 (26.1)	73.9 (23.3)	65.7 (18.7)	56.5 (13.6)	47.7 (8.7)	63.9 (17.7)
Daily mean °F (°C)	34.0 (1.1)	36.7 (2.6)	44.1 (6.7)	52.0 (11.1)	59.5 (15.3)	65.8 (18.8)	69.1 (20.6)	68.4 (20.2)	63.0 (17.2)	53.2 (11.8)	44.6 (7.0)	36.9 (2.7)	52.3 (11.3)
Mean daily minimum °F (°C)	23.2 (−4.9)	25.0 (−3.9)	31.8 (−0.1)	39.0 (3.9)	47.1 (8.4)	54.3 (12.4)	58.3 (14.6)	57.7 (14.3)	52.2 (11.2)	39.6 (4.2)	32.7 (0.4)	26.1 (−3.3)	40.6 (4.8)
Average precipitation inches (mm)	6.7 (169)	6.7 (169)	7.9 (200)	6.1 (155)	6.5 (165)	6.1 (155)	6.3 (160)	6.2 (157)	5.8 (148)	5.4 (138)	6.3 (160)	6.9 (175)	76.9 (1,951)

== Demographics ==
Historical population
Census	Pop.	Note	%±
1980	65		—
1990	187		187.7%
2000	221		18.2%
2010	272		23.1%
2020	482		77.2%
U.S. Decennial Census

As of the census of 2000, there were 221 people, 112 households, and 81 families residing in the city. The population density was 72.9 inhabitants per square mile (28.1/km^{2}). There were 675 housing units at an average density of 222.6 per square mile (85.9/km^{2}). The racial makeup of the city was 95.48% White, 4.07% African American, and 0.45% from two or more races.

There were 112 households, out of which 11.6% had children under the age of 18 living with them, 67.9% were married couples living together, 4.5% had a female householder with no husband present, and 26.8% were non-families. 25.0% of all households were made up of individuals, and 16.1% had someone living alone who was 65 years of age or older. The average household size was 1.97 and the average family size was 2.30.

In the city the population was spread out, with 9.5% under the age of 18, 2.3% from 18 to 24, 8.1% from 25 to 44, 34.4% from 45 to 64, and 45.7% who were 65 years of age or older. The median age was 64 years. For every 100 females, there were 87.3 males. For every 100 females age 18 and over, there were 88.7 males.

In 2010 the largest self-identified ancestry/ethnic groups were:

- People who self-identified as being of English ancestry - 33.0%
- People who self-identified as being of German ancestry - 20.6%
- People who self-identified as being of "American" ancestry - 10.3%
- People who self-identified as being of Irish ancestry - 8.5%
- People who self-identified as being of Scottish ancestry - 4.6%
- People who self-identified as being of Scots-Irish ancestry - 4.4%
- People who self-identified as being of French ancestry - 3.6%
- People who self-identified as being of Dutch ancestry - 2.3%

The median income for a household in the city was $44,750, and the median income for a family was $57,500. Males had a median income of $41,875 versus $13,750 for females. The per capita income for the city was $31,511. About 5.6% of families and 4.8% of the population were below the poverty line, including 5.3% of those under the age of eighteen and 1.8% of those 65 or over.
