= J. L. Dillard =

American linguist (1924–2009)

Joey Lee Dillard
- Born: 1924
- Died: 2009 (aged 84–85)
- Occupation: Linguist

Joey Lee Dillard (1924–2009) was an American linguist known for his work on African-American Vernacular English. Dillard was a professor at Shawnee State University.

== Selected bibliography ==
Dillard's works include:

- J L Dillard (1965), Afro-American vehicle and other names, Rio Piedras, P.R.: Institute of Caribbean Studies, Faculty of Social Sciences, University of Puerto Rico
- J L Dillard (1968), The creolist and the study of Negro non-standard dialects in the continental United States
- J L Dillard (1970), On the beginnings of Black English in the new world
- J L Dillard (1970), Optional ordering rules and genetic relationships in pidgin-derived languages
- J L Dillard (1971), The West African day names in Nova Scotia
- J L Dillard (1971), Creole Portuguese and Creole English : the early records, Atlanta: Atlanta University
- J L Dillard (1971), The history of Black English in Nova Scotia : a first step
- J L Dillard (1972), Black English, New York: Random House
- J L Dillard (1972), Black English : its history and usage in the United States, New York: Random House
- J L Dillard (1972), White through Black : the neglected side of New World communication patterns
- J L Dillard (1975), Perspectives on black English, The Hague: Mouton
- J L Dillard (1975), All-American English, New York: Random House
- J L Dillard (1976), Socio-historical factors in the formation of the Creoles, The Hague; Paris: Mouton
- J L Dillard (1976), Black names, The Hague: Mouton
- J L Dillard (1976), American talk : where our words came from, New York: Random House
- J L Dillard (1977), Lexicon of Black English, New York: Seabury press
- J L Dillard (1980), Perspectives on American English, The Hague; Paris; New York: Mouton
- Albert H Marckwardt; J L Dillard (1980), American English, New York: Oxford University Press
- J L Dillard (1985), Toward a social history of American English, Berlin; New York: Mouton
- J L Dillard (1992), A history of American English, London; New York: Longman
