= James Price Dillard =

American academic

James Price Dillard is a distinguished professor of Communication Arts and Sciences Department at Penn State University. He has authored and co-authored over 50 manuscripts primarily on the role of emotion and persuasive influence. Dillard graduated in 1976 from the University of Kansas with a Bachelor's degree in Speech Communication and Psychology. In 1978, he earned his Master's degree in Communication from Arizona State University and in 1983, he received a Ph.D. in Communication from Michigan State University. Dillard is currently teaching Measurement in Communication Science and Persuasive Message Processing classes at Penn State University. His awards include the NCA Golden Anniversary Award for the most outstanding, Distinguished Book Award, Communication and Social Cognition Division of the National Communication Association and many others.

Dillard is most known in the academic world for his views on affect and persuasion. His research aims to enhance understanding of the role of emotion in persuasion and interpersonal influence.

== Views on Affect ==
Dillard has done many studies of the use of affect in our social and environmental interactions. He theorizes how mood and emotion guide our behavior in our everyday interactions. Dillard concludes that affect affects human behavior in three main ways:

1. The primary function of affect is to guide behavior. Affect evolved because it enabled successful interaction with the environment.
2. For human beings, the most important environment was the social environment. Affect evolved in the presence and service of social interaction.
3. Human beings strategically manage their affective states. The relative utility of these efforts can be judged only by reference to the environment.

Dillard explains how affect is "phasic" and "tonic" or baseline, each one affecting the other. Affect as "phasic" acting with emotion. If someone feels fear from a stimulus, then they run away from that stimulus. If someone feels happiness when around a certain stimulus, then they would approach that stimulus. But Dillard concludes that emotions more involved than just approach and withdrawal: "If we view emotions as phasic responses to the environment, the other side of the solution is the tonic (baseline) state of the organism. Any decision as to the appropriate course of action (i.e., engagement versus withdrawal) must depend on the resources available to the organism at the time the action is required. The experiential aspect of moods can be thought of as a readout of the operating level of the organism's various biopsychological systems."

"Affect enables organisms to address the challenges posed by interaction with the environment. One fundamental problem is how to acquire the resources that enable survival and reproduction. Social life-forms have adopted a strategy for solving that problem, which depends on cooperation and role specialization."

Dillard takes on a Darwinian perspective on affect: it evolved out of a need for survival.

== Perspectives on affect ==
1. Affect might proceed and serve as the basis of communication.
2. Communication is emotion-manifesting when it provides information about the internal state of the actor.
3. Communication can be emotion-inducing.

== Views on mood ==
Dillard concludes that mood is a complex phenomenon, but it may be simplified as being either positive or negative. If a person is in a negative mood, then his or her reactions will be skewed towards the negative. A negative mood assumes that resources are seemingly depleted and takes into account challenging interactions with one's environment. If a person is in a positive mood then one feels he has ample resources to react to environmental stimulus. Be it a positive or a negative mood, Dillard considers this state to be a person's "tonic" state, or baseline mood. When the "phasic" and "tonic" states are combined, a reaction to stimulus is considered to be natural.

"Dominance and affiliation relations are efficient means of regulating resource distribution and arguably the defining ingredients in the human experience. The communication of emotion is central to the development, maintenance, and modification of these structures."

== Academic timeline ==
1971-76 B.A., speech communication & psychology. University of Kansas.

1976-78 M.A., communication. Arizona State University.

1978-83 Ph.D., communication. Michigan State University.

1982-83 visiting assistant professor. Department of Communication Arts. University of Wisconsin–Madison.

1983-1989 assistant professor. Department of Communication Arts. University of Wisconsin–Madison.

1989-1994 associate professor. Department of Communication Arts. University of Wisconsin–Madison.

1992 special member of the graduate faculty. University of Maryland, College Park-College Park.

1993-2003 director. Center for Communication Research. University of Wisconsin–Madison.

1994-2004 professor. Department of Communication Arts. University of Wisconsin–Madison.

1997-1999 associate chair. Department of Communication Arts, University of Wisconsin–Madison.

1999-fall visiting professor. Department of Communication. Michigan State University.

2001-spring visiting professor. Department of Communication. Kent State University.

2004-2007 visiting professor. Department of Pediatrics, University of Wisconsin–Madison.

2004–present professor, Department of Communication Arts & Sciences, The Pennsylvania State University

== Books and Journals ==
- Dillard, J.P. (Ed.). (1990). Seeking compliance: The production of interpersonal influence messages. Scottsdale, AZ: Gorsuch-Scarisbrick.
- Dillard, J.P., & Wilson, B.J. (Eds.) (1993). Special issue of Communication Research on The Role of Affect in Persuading and Informing.
- Burgoon, M., & Dillard, J.P. (Eds.) (1995). Special issue of Communication Research on Social Influence.
- Wilson, S.R., Greene, J.O., & Dillard, J.P. (Eds.) (2000). Special issue of Communication Theory on Message Production.
- Dillard, J.P., & Pfau, M. (Eds.) (2002). The persuasion handbook: Developments in theory and practice. Thousand Oaks, CA: Sage.
- Dillard, J.P., & Shen, L. (2013). The SAGE handbook of persuasion: Developments in theory and practice (2nd ed.). Thousand Oaks, CA: Sage.

== Awards and honors ==
1978 - First Place in the Interpersonal/Organizational division of the Western Speech Communication Association. Phoenix. Mode of uncertainty reduction as a determinant of the amount of communication during initial interactions. (co-authored with Stinnett, W., Malandro, L., Hutchinson, D., Schlecter, J., & Stewart, J.)

1981 - Top Three Award in the Organizational Communication division of the International Communication Association, Philadelphia. Communicator competence in the workplace: Model testing and scale development.(co-authored with P. Monge, S. Bachman, & E. Eisenberg)

1987 - Top Four Award in the Interpersonal/Small Group division of the Speech Communication Association, Boston. Empathy, communication, and prosocial behavior. (co-authored with J. Stiff, B. Somera, H. Kim, & C. Sleight)

1988 - Top Three in the Interpersonal Communication Interest Group of the Western Speech Communication Association, Spokane. Compliance-gaining message selection: What is our dependent variable? (sole author)

1989 - First Place in the Interpersonal Communication Interest Group of the Western Speech Communication Association, San Diego. Types of influence goals in personal relationships. (sole author)

1993 - Top Four in the Information Systems Division of the International Communication Association, Washington, D.C. Rethinking the study of fear appeals. (sole author)

1995 - John E. Hunter Meta-Analysis Award, Information Systems Division of the International Communication Association.

1994-1996 - Vilas Associate Professorship.

1996 - Top Four in the Information Systems Division of the International Communication Association, Chicago. The persuasive effects of metaphor: A meta-analysis. (co-authored with P. Sopory) 5

1996 - Top Four in the Interpersonal/Small Group division of the Speech Communication Association. San Diego. The sounds of dominance: Vocal precursors to dominance judgments during interpersonal influence. (co-authored with K. Tusing)

1998 - First Place in the Health Communication Division of the National Communication Association, New York. Affect and persuasion: Emotional responses to public service announcements. (co-authored with E. Peck)

2001 - Top Three in the Health Communication Division of the International Communication Association, Washington, D.C. Persuasion and the structure of affect: Dual systems and discrete emotions as complementary models. (co-authored with E. Peck)

2001 - Top Three in the Interpersonal Division of the International Communication Association, Washington, D.C. Environmental factors governing the absolute and relative activation of relational communication frames. (co-authored with K. Tusing and J. Morrill).

2001 - Top Three in the Communication & Social Cognition Division of the National Communication Association, Atlanta. Single- and multi-motive processing of a fear appeal: Encouraging influenza vaccinations. (co-authored with J.W. Anderson).

2002 - NCA Golden Anniversary Award for Dillard & Peck (2001). This award is given for "the most outstanding scholarly monograph published during the previous calendar year" (National Communication Association website).

2004 - John E. Hunter Meta-Analysis Award, Information Systems Division of the International Communication Association.

2004 - Distinguished Book Award, Communication and Social Cognition Division of the National Communication Association. For Dillard & Pfau's The Persuasion Handbook: Developments in Theory and Practice.

2006 - Top Three in the Communication & Social Cognition Division of the National Communication Association, San Antonio. The influence of behavioral inhibition/approach systems and message framing on the processing of persuasive health messages. (co-authored with L. Shen).
