= Dillard, Georgia =

- City
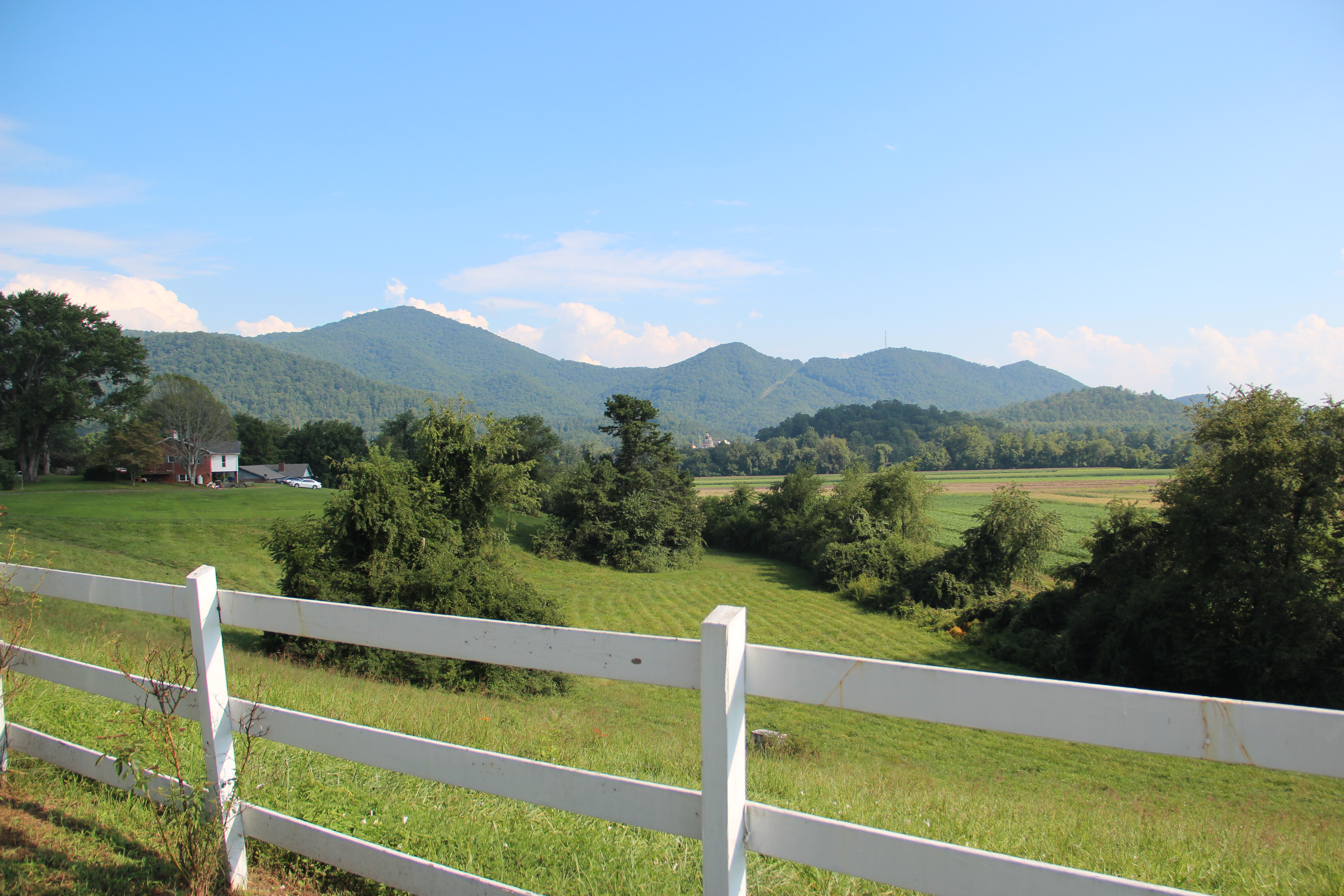
- Mountains viewed from the Dillard House

- Location in Rabun County and the state of Georgia
- Coordinates: 34°58′30″N 83°22′55″W
- Country: United States
- State: Georgia
- County: Rabun

Area
  - Total: 1.79 sq mi (4.63 km^{2})
  - Land: 1.76 sq mi (4.56 km^{2})
  - Water: 0.027 sq mi (0.07 km^{2})
- Elevation: 2,146 ft (654 m)

Population (2020)
  - Total: 337
  - Density: 191.4/sq mi (73.89/km^{2})
- Time zone: UTC-5 (Eastern (EST))
  - Summer (DST): UTC-4 (EDT)
- ZIP code: 30537
- Area code: 706
- FIPS code: 13-22976
- GNIS feature ID: 2404229
- Website: dillardgeorgia.com

Dillard is a town in Rabun County, Georgia, United States. As of the 2020 census, the city population was 337.

== History ==
John Dillard settled in the area around what is now Dillard with his son, James Dillard, circa 1823. James took title to 1,000 acres (4.0 km^{2}) of land by purchasing the lottery rights of land holders in Rabun County. John Dillard served as a lieutenant in the Virginia Militia in the American Revolution, during which he was in the Battle of Guilford Court House and other battles. Both James and John were residents of Buncombe County, North Carolina prior to their settlement on lands now comprising Dillard.

The small town is now known primarily for the Dillard House, a regionally well-known inn, restaurant and conference center that serves traditional southern fare. John M. Dillard of Greenville, South Carolina, has extensively documented the history of John Dillard and his descendants.

The Georgia General Assembly incorporated the place in 1906 as the "Town of Dillard".

== Geography ==
According to the United States Census Bureau, Dillard has a total area of 1.5 square miles (3.9 km^{2}), all land. The city is located in the Little Tennessee River valley, immediately south of the North Carolina border and is surrounded by the Blue Ridge Mountains.

== Demographics ==
Historical population
Census	Pop.	Note	%±
1910	106		—
1920	175		65.1%
1930	210		20.0%
1940	204		−2.9%
1950	186		−8.8%
1960	204		9.7%
1970	186		−8.8%
1980	238		28.0%
1990	199		−16.4%
2000	198		−0.5%
2010	339		71.2%
2020	337		−0.6%
U.S. Decennial Census

As of the census of 2000, there were 198 people, 88 households, and 55 families residing in the city. The population density was 127.9 inhabitants per square mile (49.4/km^{2}). There were 115 housing units at an average density of 74.3 per square mile (28.7/km^{2}). The racial makeup of the city was 93.94% White, 0.51% Native American, 5.56% from other races. Hispanic or Latino of any race were 12.63% of the population.

There were 88 households, out of which 19.3% had children under the age of 18 living with them, 53.4% were married couples living together, 6.8% had a female householder with no husband present, and 36.4% were non-families. 35.2% of all households were made up of individuals, and 17.0% had someone living alone who was 65 years of age or older. The average household size was 2.25 and the average family size was 2.89.

In the city, the population was spread out, with 19.7% under the age of 18, 7.6% from 18 to 24, 19.7% from 25 to 44, 33.8% from 45 to 64, and 19.2% who were 65 years of age or older. The median age was 48 years. For every 100 females, there were 88.6 males. For every 100 females age 18 and over, there were 80.7 males.

The median income for a household in the city was $41,250, and the median income for a family was $44,167. Males had a median income of $33,958 versus $31,875 for females. The per capita income for the city was $17,951. About 9.1% of families and 10.8% of the population were below the poverty line, including 9.3% of those under the age of eighteen and 19.4% of those 65 or over.

== Notable person ==
- James Mason, professional golfer.
