= List of Waterfalls of Georgia (U.S. state) =

The waterfalls of the U.S. state of Georgia are a major part of the region's geography, and tourism and outdoor recreation draw. Many are located in state parks, national forests, wildlife management areas, other public lands, and private property.

== Waterfalls ==
- Ada-Hi Falls in the Black Rock Mountain State Park.
- Amicalola Falls
- Ammons Creek Falls
- Angel Falls (Georgia)
- Anna Ruby Falls
- Bad Branch Falls
- Becky Branch Falls
- Blue Hole Falls
- Bull Sluice
- Caledonia Cascade
- Cherokee Falls
- Cochrans Falls
- Darnell Falls
- DeSoto Falls (Georgia)
- Dick's Creek Falls
- Dukes Creek
- Estatoah Falls
- Helton Creek Falls
- Hemlock Falls
- Hemlock Falls (Cloudland Canyon)
- High Falls of Lookout Mountain
- High Shoals Creek Falls
- Hightower Falls
- Holcomb Creek Falls
- Horsetrough Falls
- Lake Trahlyta Spillway
- Long Creek Falls
- Martin Creek Falls
- Minnehaha Falls (Georgia)
- Mud Creek Falls
- Panther Falls (Georgia)
- Raven Cliff Falls (Georgia)
- Tallulah Gorge
- Toccoa Falls

=== Other waterfalls ===
List of other waterfalls. There are an estimated 700 waterfalls in Georgia.

- Big Summer Falls
- Crystal Hawk Falls
- Crystal Rose Falls
- Crystal Sunset Falls
- Deep Glen Falls
- Eagle Valley Falls
- East Valley Falls
- Golden Oak Falls
- Golden Deep Falls
- Golden Maple Falls
- Golden Pine Falls
- Hidden East Falls
- Hidden High Falls
- Lily River Falls
- Little Granite Falls
- Lower Sunset Falls
- Maple Gorge Falls
- Marble River Falls
- Pine Valley Falls
- Rainbow Cedar Falls
- Rainbow Fern Falls
- Rainbow Rock Falls
- Rose River Falls
- Silver Cedar Falls
- Slate River Falls
- Slate Valley Falls
- South River Falls
- South Valley Falls
- Tatum Gulf Falls (private property): 50 Foot single-tier free-fall. The first and one of three waterfalls on Tatum Gulf Creek in Dade County. Includes the 20 feet (6.1 m) multi-tiered sheer drop and cascade Middle Tatum Gulf Falls, and the 20 feet (6.1 m) multi-tiered stairstep/cascade Lower Tatum Gulf Falls.
- West Canyon Falls

== See also ==
- List of waterfalls in North Georgia
