= Black Rock Mountain State Park =

State park in Blue Ridge region of Georgia, USA

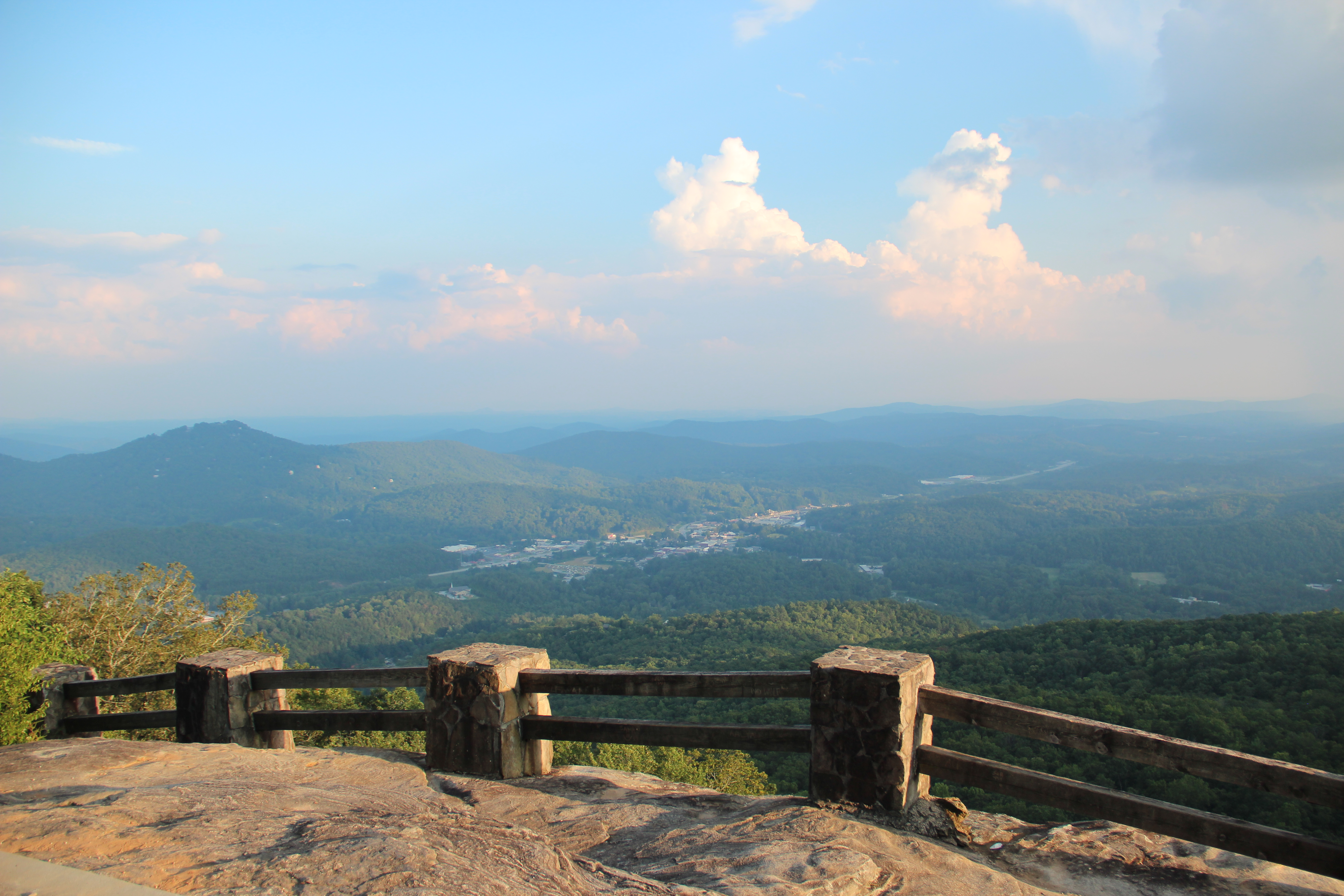
- View from Black Rock Mountain State Park

- Location within Georgia Location within the United States
- Location: Rabun County, Georgia, USA
- Nearest city: Clayton, Georgia
- Coordinates: 34°54′34″N 83°24′55″W
- Area: 1,743 acres (7.05 km^{2}; 2.72 sq mi)
- Governing body: Georgia State Park
- Website: Black Rock Mountain State Park

Black Rock Mountain State Park is a 1,743-acre (705 ha) Georgia, United States, state park west of Mountain City in Rabun County, in the Blue Ridge Mountains. It is named after its sheer cliffs of dark-colored biotite gneiss. Astride the Eastern Continental Divide at an elevation of 3,640 feet (1,110 m), the park provides many scenic overlooks and 80-mile (130 km) vistas of the southern Appalachian Mountains. On a clear day, four states are visible: Georgia, North Carolina, South Carolina, and Tennessee. In addition to Black Rock Mountain itself, the park includes four other peaks over 3,000 feet (910 m) in elevation, making it the state's highest state park. As of 2019, it was open to visitors year round.

== History ==
Most of the rock outcrops found throughout the park are made of biotite gneiss, a metamorphic rock that underlies a large portion of the Georgia Blue Ridge. Black Rock Mountain State Park was established in 1952 and originally consisted of 1,000 acres (400 ha). Before the park was established, Rabun County native John V. Arrendale began assembling the area that would later become the park, making his first 70-acre (280,000 m^{2}) purchase in 1938. Numerous purchases have added to the park's area, including 301 acres (1.22 km^{2}) added in 1995 with funding received from then-Governor Zell Miller's Preservation 2000 land acquisition program. Several smaller acquisitions have added acreage to the park's southwest corner.

== Climate ==
Climate data for Mountain City 2 SW, Georgia (3464 feet)
Month	Jan	Feb	Mar	Apr	May	Jun	Jul	Aug	Sep	Oct	Nov	Dec	Year
Mean daily maximum °F (°C)	44.4 (6.9)	47.5 (8.6)	55.3 (12.9)	63.5 (17.5)	69.7 (20.9)	73.9 (23.3)	76.8 (24.9)	76.3 (24.6)	71.7 (22.1)	63.7 (17.6)	57.1 (13.9)	46.8 (8.2)	62.2 (16.8)
Daily mean °F (°C)	34.8 (1.6)	37.5 (3.1)	44.6 (7.0)	53.1 (11.7)	60.2 (15.7)	66.2 (19.0)	69.2 (20.7)	68.5 (20.3)	63.5 (17.5)	54.2 (12.3)	47.6 (8.7)	37.6 (3.1)	53.1 (11.7)
Mean daily minimum °F (°C)	25.1 (−3.8)	27.4 (−2.6)	33.8 (1.0)	42.7 (5.9)	50.7 (10.4)	58.5 (14.7)	61.6 (16.4)	60.7 (15.9)	55.2 (12.9)	44.6 (7.0)	38.0 (3.3)	28.3 (−2.1)	43.9 (6.6)
Average precipitation inches (mm)	5.86 (149)	5.93 (151)	6.28 (160)	4.69 (119)	5.34 (136)	5.87 (149)	5.27 (134)	5.56 (141)	6.14 (156)	4.93 (125)	6.41 (163)	6.33 (161)	68.61 (1,743)
Source: NOAA (normals 1981−2010)

== Hiking and camping ==
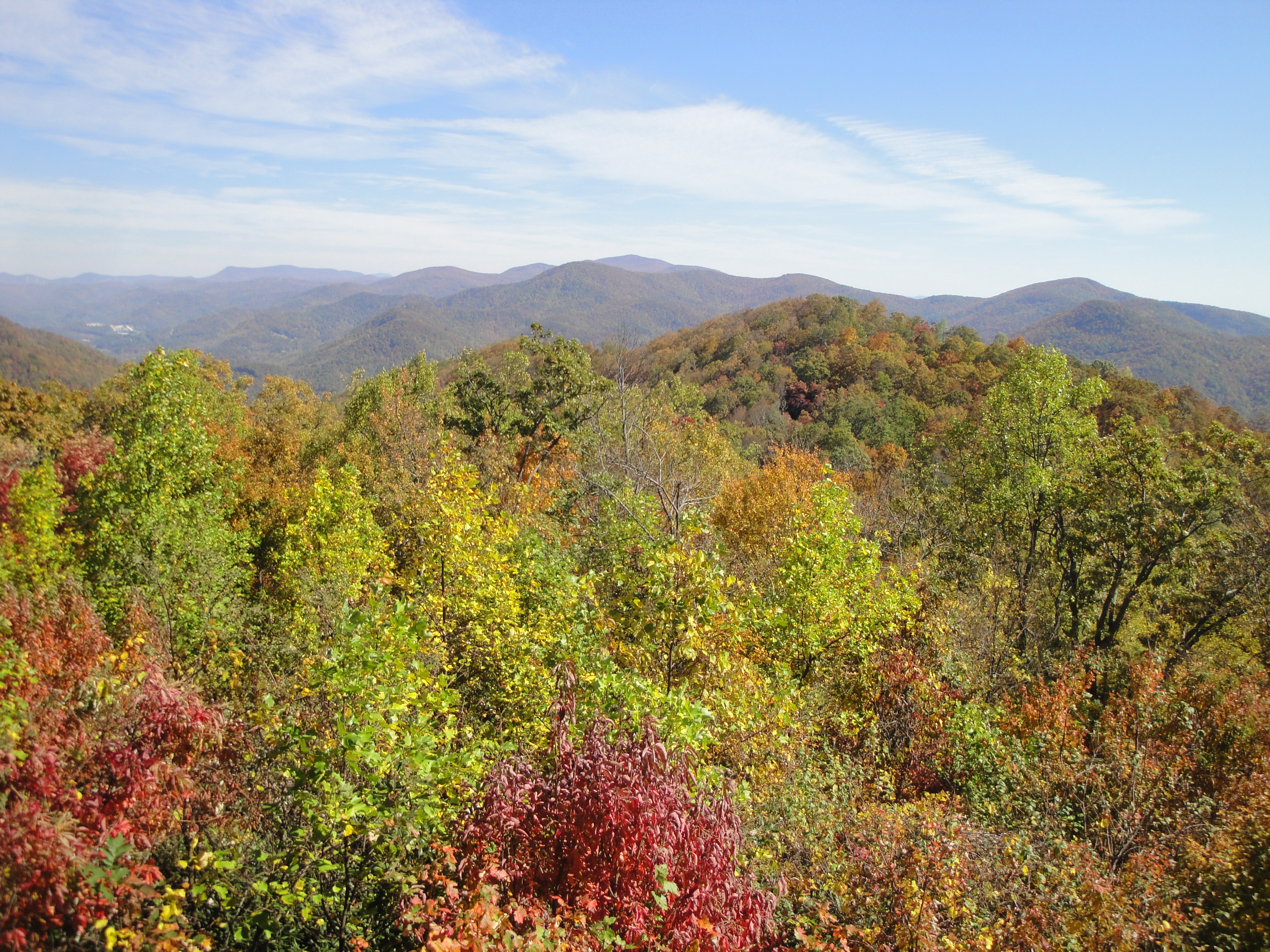
Blue Ridge overlook

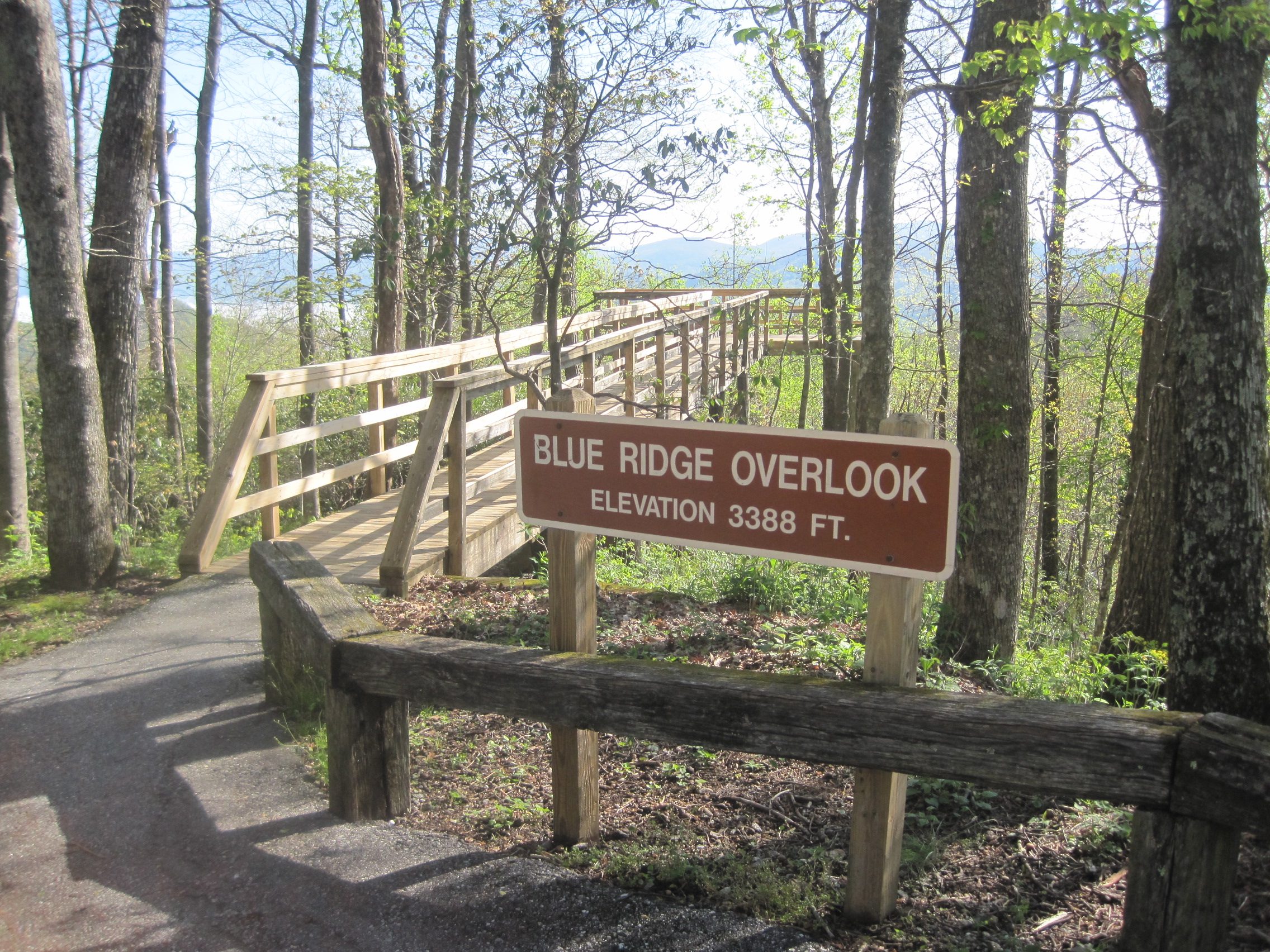
Observation deck for the Blue Ridge overlook

There are five hiking trails through forests, alongside mountain streams and around 17-acre (6.9 ha) Black Rock Lake. The 2.2-mile (3.5 km) Tennessee Rock Trail crosses Black Rock Mountain's north slope before climbing across the mountain's summit and following the Eastern Continental Divide. From the trail's namesake feature, Tennessee Rock, vistas can be seen that extend northward into the Great Smoky Mountains National Park, including Kuwohi, the highest point in Tennessee.

The 7.2-mile (11.6 km) James E. Edmonds Trail is named for "Mr. Eddie" Edmonds, one of the park's earliest and longest-serving rangers. This rugged trail features four secluded campsites that allow backpackers with reservations to escape into the park's quiet backcountry. The campsites are undeveloped and offer no facilities. In places the Edmonds Trail weaves in and out of laurel-filled coves and follows mountain streams with small waterfalls. At the trail's northern end, there are 3,162-foot (964 m) Lookoff Mountain and views of Wolffork Valley, the source of the Little Tennessee River.

The Ada-Hi Falls Trail is named for the Cherokee word for "forest". The quarter-mile trail begins near the entrance of the park's RV camping area and leads into a moist north-facing cove filled with rosebay rhododendron. The lower portion of the trail becomes very steep and utilizes a series of wooden steps before ending on the observation platform for Ada-hi Falls, a small cascade typical of falls found in the upper reaches of mountain coves. The trail is short but strenuous due to the 220-foot (67 m) elevation change.

The 0.85-mile (1.37 km) Black Rock Lake Trail was completed in August, 2007. This gently rolling path encircles Black Rock Lake and features several wooden bridges that span streams, as well as trailside benches that afford scenic views of the lake.

The park's newest trail, the Norma Campbell Cove Trail, is only 200 yards. It begins on the southern edge of the Eastern Continental Divide near the Marie Mellinger Center and descends into the upper reaches of a south-facing cove filled with ferns, mayapple and trillium. It passes huge boulders and large rock outcrops, as well as small springs that flow into Stekoa Creek, one of the principal tributaries of the federally designated "wild and scenic" Chattooga River. The cove and trail are named for the late Norma Campbell, a popular park naturalist, who led the decade-long effort to acquire funding for the construction of the Marie Mellinger Center, the park's primary programming and special event facility.

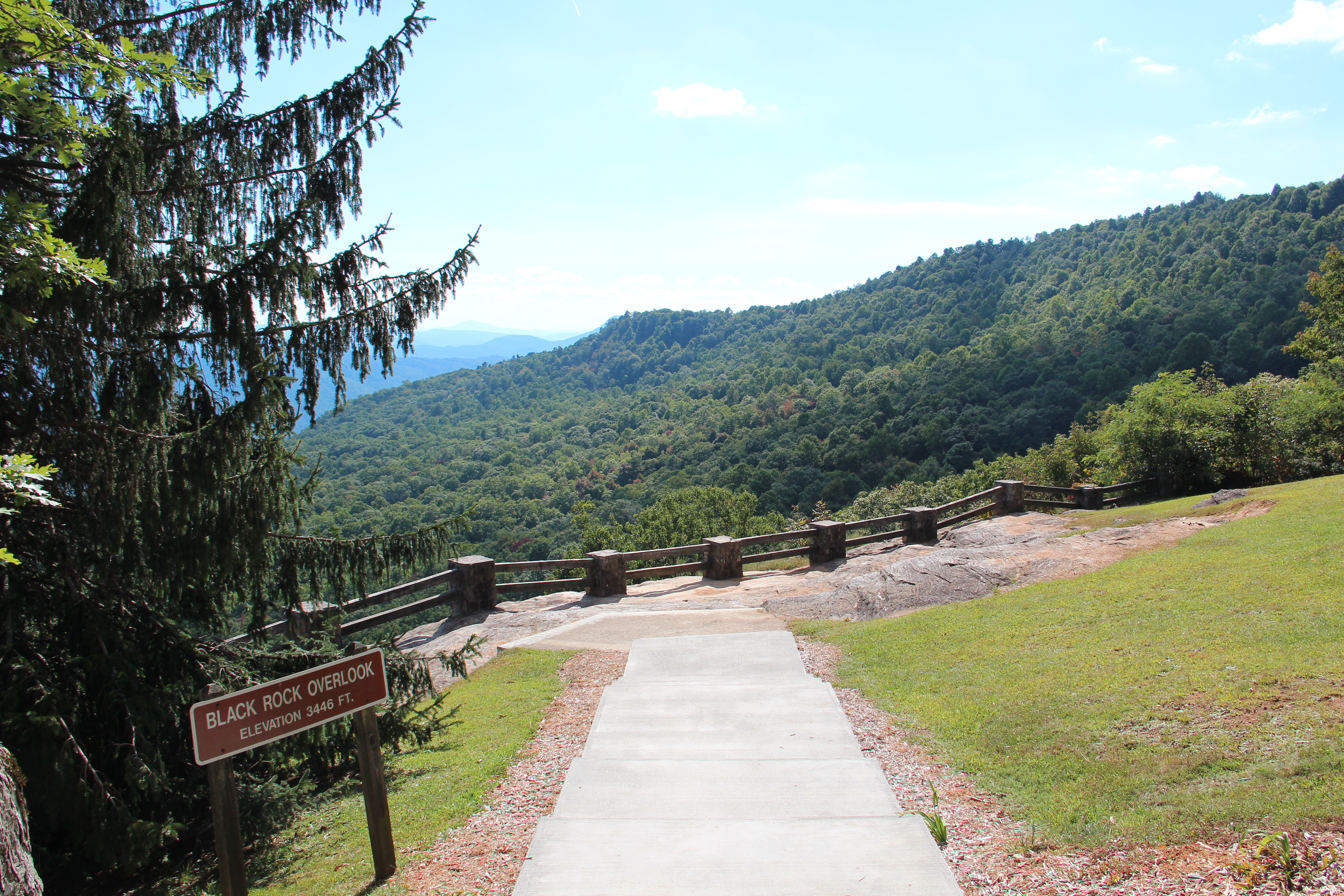
Black Rock overlook

The park offers a variety of camping experiences. It has a 44-site campground featuring water, electricity and cable TV hookups for recreational vehicles. There are also 12 isolated walk-in tent sites in Hickory Cove on the mountain's southeastern slope. On the park's westernmost ridge are ten rental cottages and Camp Tsatu-gi, a primitive pioneer campsite designed for use by organized groups.

== Marie Mellinger Center ==
The park's newest facility, the Marie Mellinger Center, was completed in July 2010. Named for one of the region's most-noted botanists, the 1,484-square-foot (137.9 m^{2}) facility is designed to accommodate a variety of uses including special events; country, bluegrass, and gospel music programs; nature arts and crafts; and other naturalist-led programs. A 1,150-square-foot (107 m^{2}) deck overlooks densely forested Norma Campbell Cove. A separate construction project to add restroom facilities to the Mellinger Center was completed in March 2011. The facility was formally dedicated during a public ceremony on October 8, 2011.

== Black Rock Lake ==
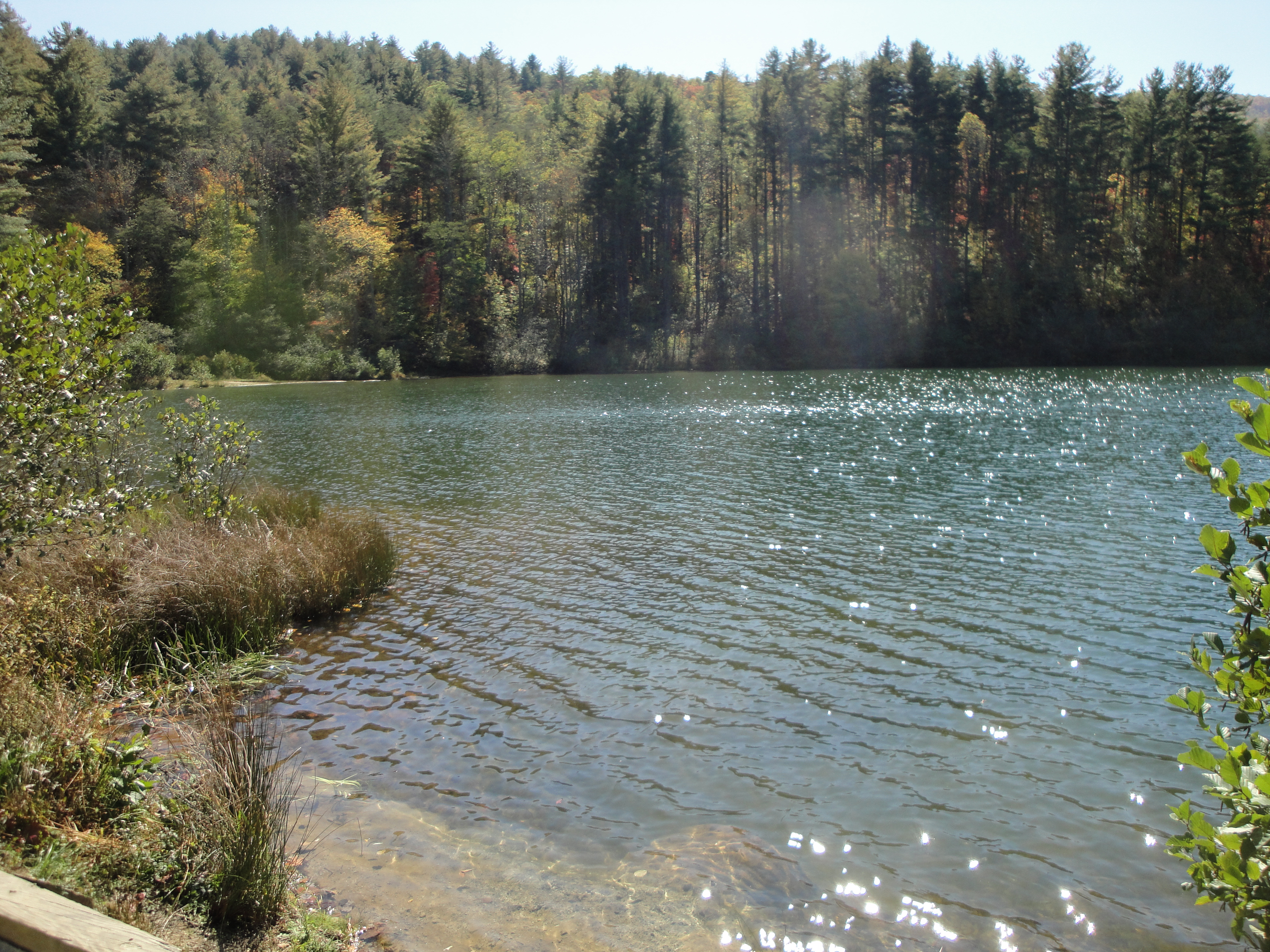
Black Rock Lake

In September, 2010, Black Rock Lake was officially opened for boating for the first time since its construction in 1974. Canoes, kayaks, and other small boats are authorized. No boat ramps exist.

The Turtle Rock Fishing Pier, near Taylors Chapel Road, is barrier-fee and offers easy lake access for fishermen with mobility challenges.

During the spring and early summer, Black Rock Lake is regularly stocked with rainbow trout. In addition, anglers fish for catfish, bream, yellow perch, and large-mouth bass.

== Facilities ==
- 38 Tent/RV/Trailer sites
- 4 Backcountry Campsites
- 11 Walk-In Campsites
- 10 Cottages
- 2 Picnic Shelters
- 1 Pioneer Campground
- 11-mile (18 km) hiking trail system
- Multiple picnic areas
- Camp Tsatu-gi Pioneer Camping Area
- Summit Visitor Center
- 17-acre (69,000 m^{2}) Black Rock Lake
- Turtle Rock Fishing Pier (wheelchair-accessible)
- Marie Mellinger Center
- Children's playground

== Annual events ==
- Junior Fishing Rodeo
- Happy Birthday, America!

== Tornado ==
On April 27, 2011, the park was hit by an EF-2 tornado spawned from the same supercell thunderstorm that had earlier in the evening tracked across central Alabama, heavily damaging Tuscaloosa. Thousands of trees were snapped or uprooted, and large parts of the park's camping areas and summit area were damaged. In the camping area, several cars and trucks were crushed by falling trees, however, no injuries were sustained. The park was re-opened to the public on May 6; however, large swaths of downed timber remain, especially on the mountain's westernmost flank above 3,200 feet. Most park trails were re-opened on May 13, with the exception of the Ada-hi Falls Trail. A large section of wooden steps was crushed by fallen trees. The trail has since been repaired and reopened.

== Gallery ==
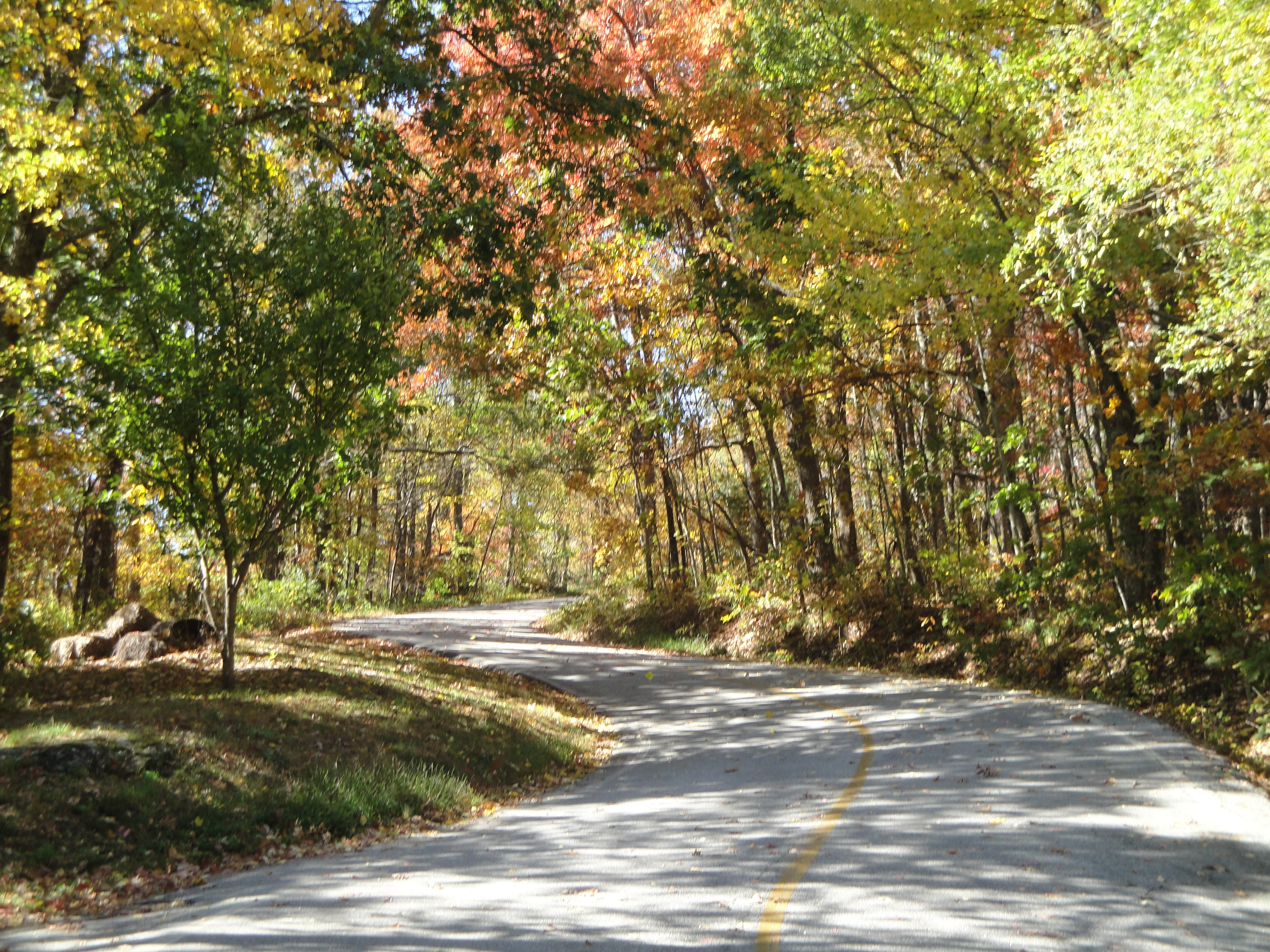
Road on Black Rock Mountain

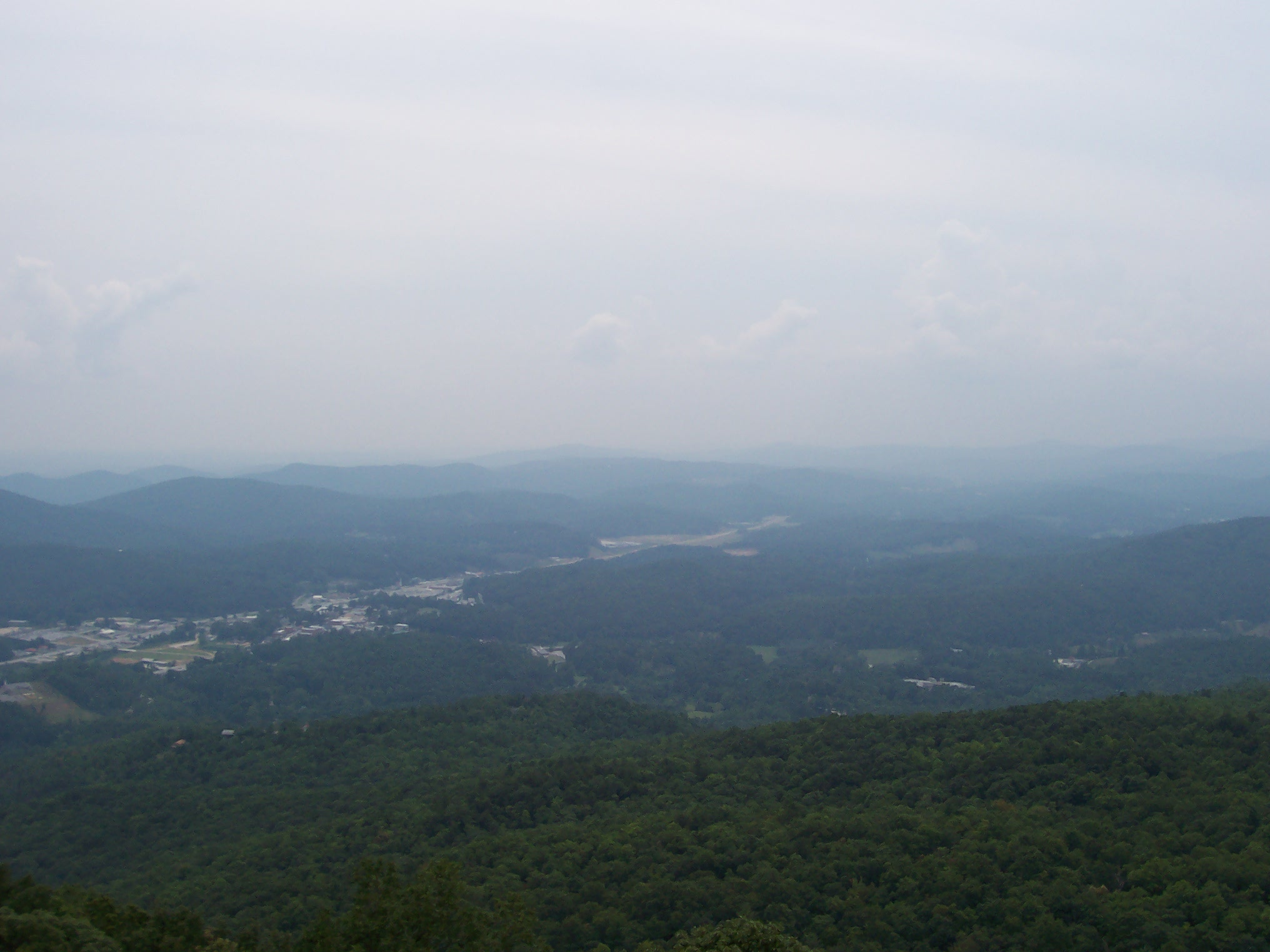
Another view from Black Rock Mountain State Park

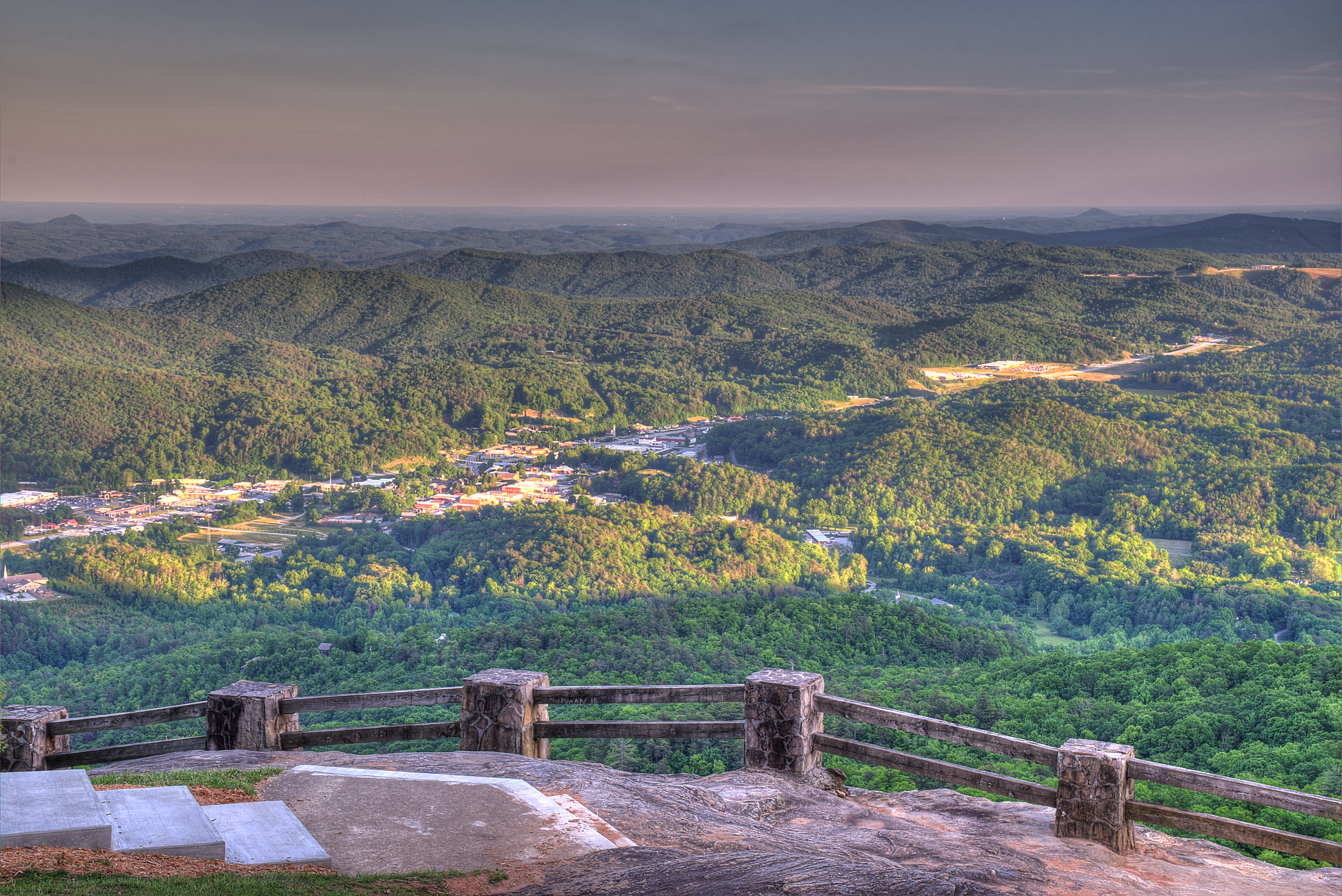
Black Rock Overlook

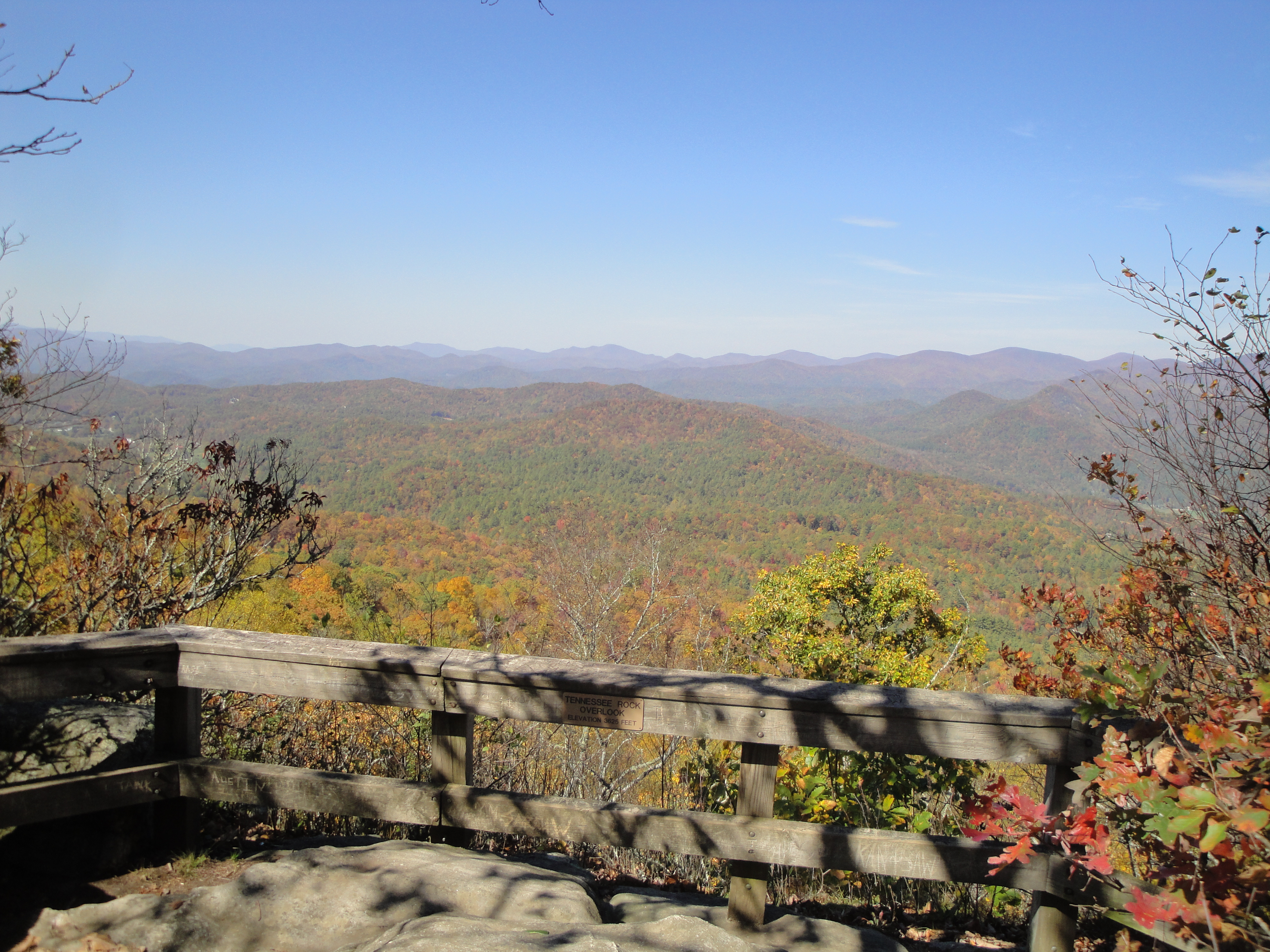
Tennessee Rock Overlook

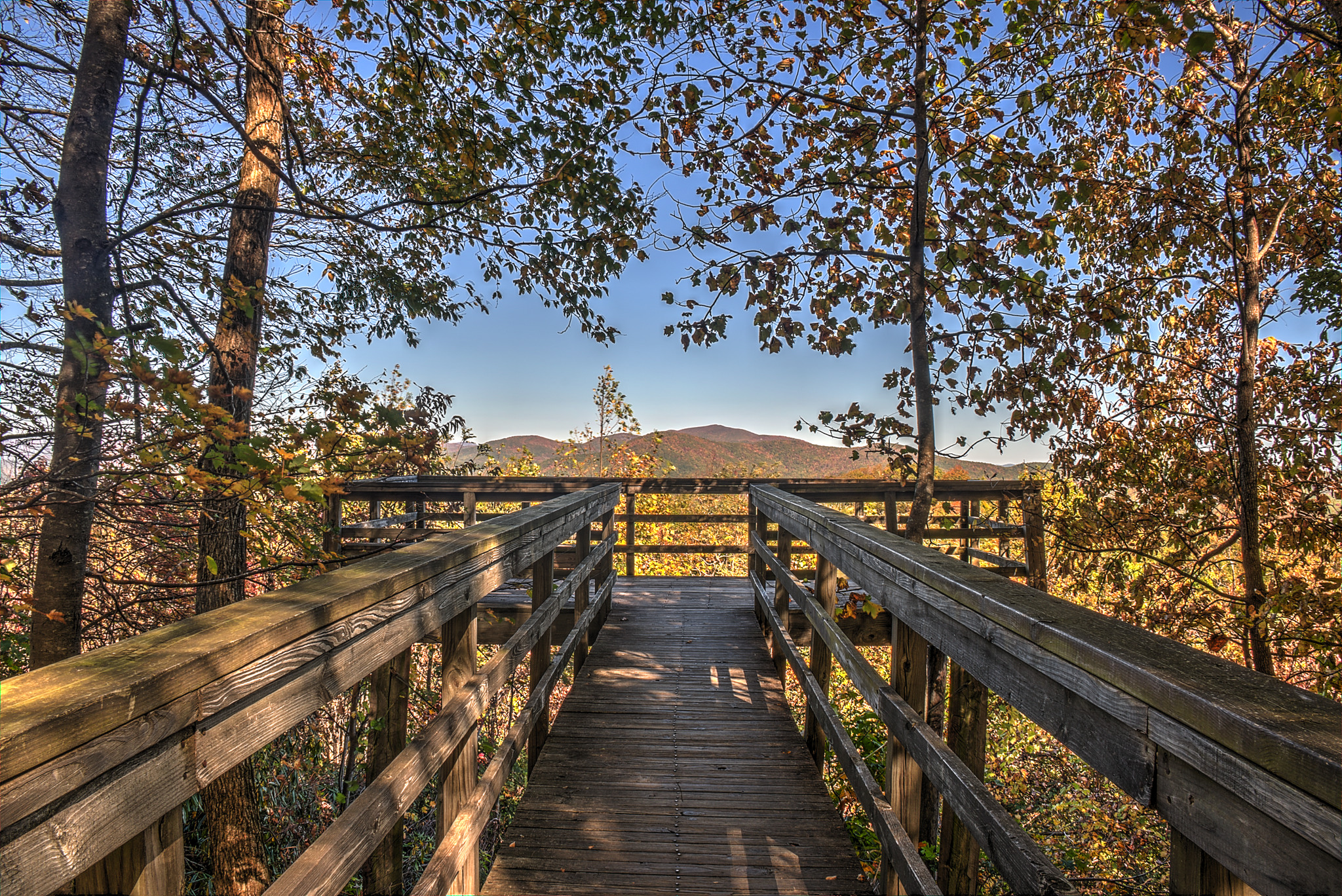
Cowee Overlook
