= Cloudland Canyon State Park =

State park in Georgia, United States

- IUCN category III (natural monument or feature)
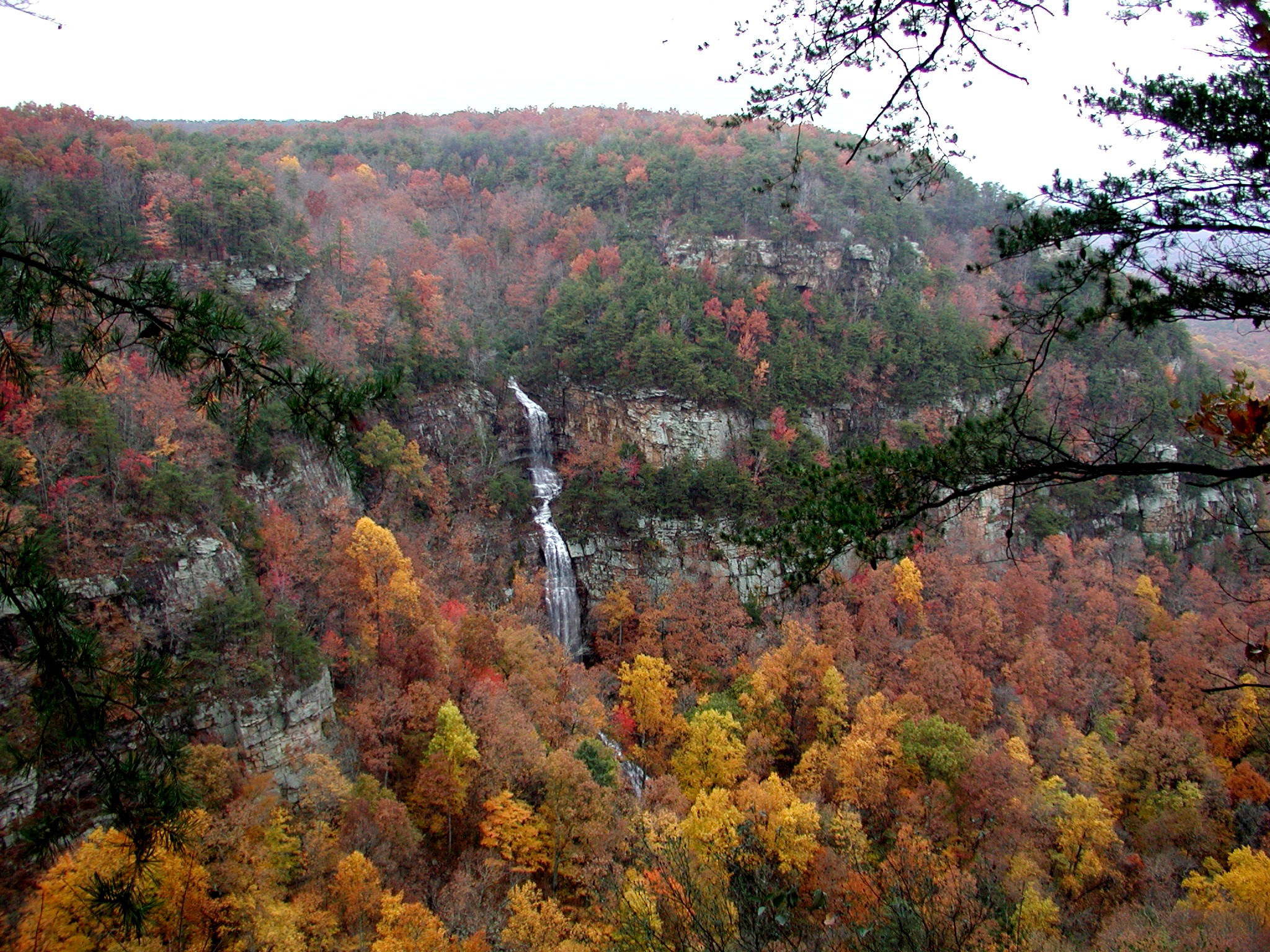
- Cloudland Canyon river

- Location within Georgia Location within the United States
- Nearest city: Trenton, Georgia
- Coordinates: 34°48′58″N 85°29′21″W
- Area: 3,485 acres (14.10 km^{2})
- Established: 1958
- Governing body: Georgia Department of Natural Resources

Cloudland Canyon State Park is a 3,485 acres (14.10 km^{2}) Georgia state park located near Trenton and Cooper Heights on the western edge of Lookout Mountain. One of the largest and most scenic parks in Georgia, it contains rugged geology, and offers visitors a range of vistas across the deep gorge cut through the mountain by Sitton Gulch Creek, where the elevation varies from 800 to over 1,800 feet. Views of the canyon can be seen from the picnic area parking lot, in addition to additional views located along the rim trail. At the bottom of the gorge, two waterfalls cascade across layers of sandstone and shale, ending in small pools below.

The park, previously known as Sitton Gulch (or Gulf) or Trenton Gulf, was purchased in stages by the state of Georgia beginning in 1938. Under President Franklin D. Roosevelt, a project of Civilian Conservation Corps during the Great Depression built the first facilities and signs in the park, which opened the following year. Today the park features a variety of campsites, cabins, hiking and recreational activities.

== History ==
Cloudland Canyon was designated a state park in 1939 when the state began acquiring land from private owners. Three of these owners, from the Mathews, McCauley and McKaig families, still reside in the area. Expansion of the park continues sporadically as new land is purchased for it. The park was originally 1,924 acres (7.8 km^{2}), and has been expanded to its present size of 3,485 acres (14.1 km^{2}).

Until 1939 the only access to the area (and much of Dade County, Georgia) was through Tennessee or Alabama. That year, Georgia began work on Highway 136 to connect U.S. 41 to the recently established park. The Civilian Conservation Corps did much of the early work to construct the state park and access roads.

== Geology ==
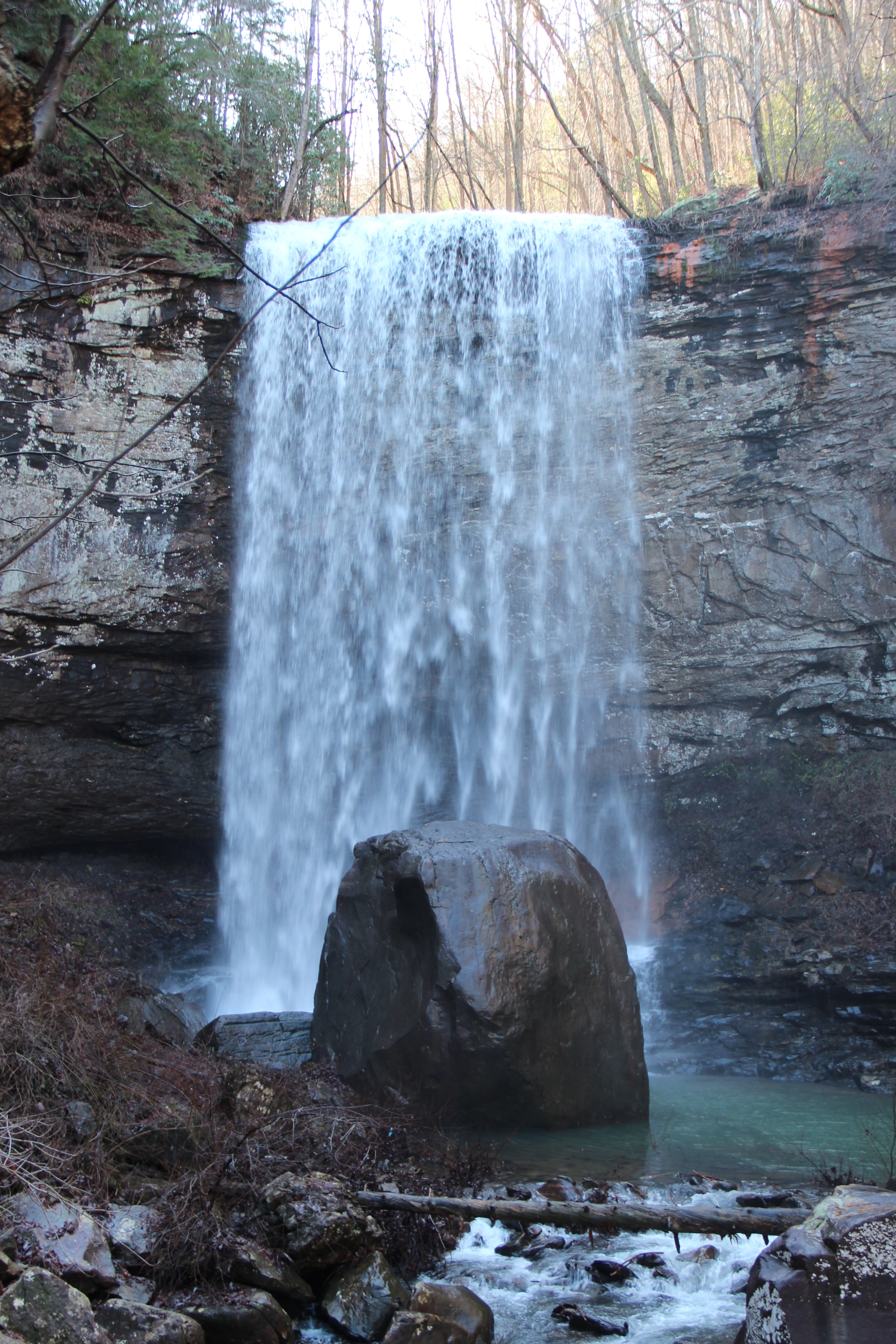
Hemlock Falls, formerly known as Cloudland Canyon Falls 2 in Cloudland Canyon State Park, Georgia

The park is located on the Cumberland Plateau, atop Lookout Mountain. On the summit of Lookout Mountain, the waters of Daniel Creek and Bear Creek cut gorges through the rock, converging to form Sitton Gulch Creek. The flat-topped mountains of the Cumberland Plateau are significantly different from the narrow Armuchee ridges beyond nearby Chickamauga Valley to the east. From a geological standpoint, Lookout Mountain is transitional between the flat-lying sedimentary beds of central Tennessee, and the ridges and valley to the east, which display more intensive folding and faulting. Most of the canyon's rock formations consist of sandstone; shale layers below the sandstone are marked by pine trees.

Lookout Mountain was created through a combination of tectonic activity and erosion. It was uplifted during the period of mountain building that formed the Appalachians, known as the Appalachian orogeny. Over 200 million years ago, the modern-day parklands lay beneath an ocean. When first formed, the entire mountain was underwater, but the rim of the canyon eventually became a beach along the edge of the receding ocean. As the ocean dried up, Sitton Gulch Creek and its tributaries, particularly Daniel Creek, eroded the rock. The sandstone forming the bluffs has a tendency to fracture into blocks, creating unusual boulder formations. The concave shape of the top of Lookout Mountain also drains rainwater through fissures into the underlying limestone, forming miles of caves in the area.

The canyon is more than 1,000 feet (300 m) deep, ranging in elevation from 800 feet (240 m) to over 1,800 feet (550 m); the park's peak elevation is 1,980 feet (600 m). The bottom of Cloudland canyon contains a slope of rock talus, which are sandstone and shale fragments. The valley floor is also rich in fossil-bearing limestone.

== Hiking trails ==
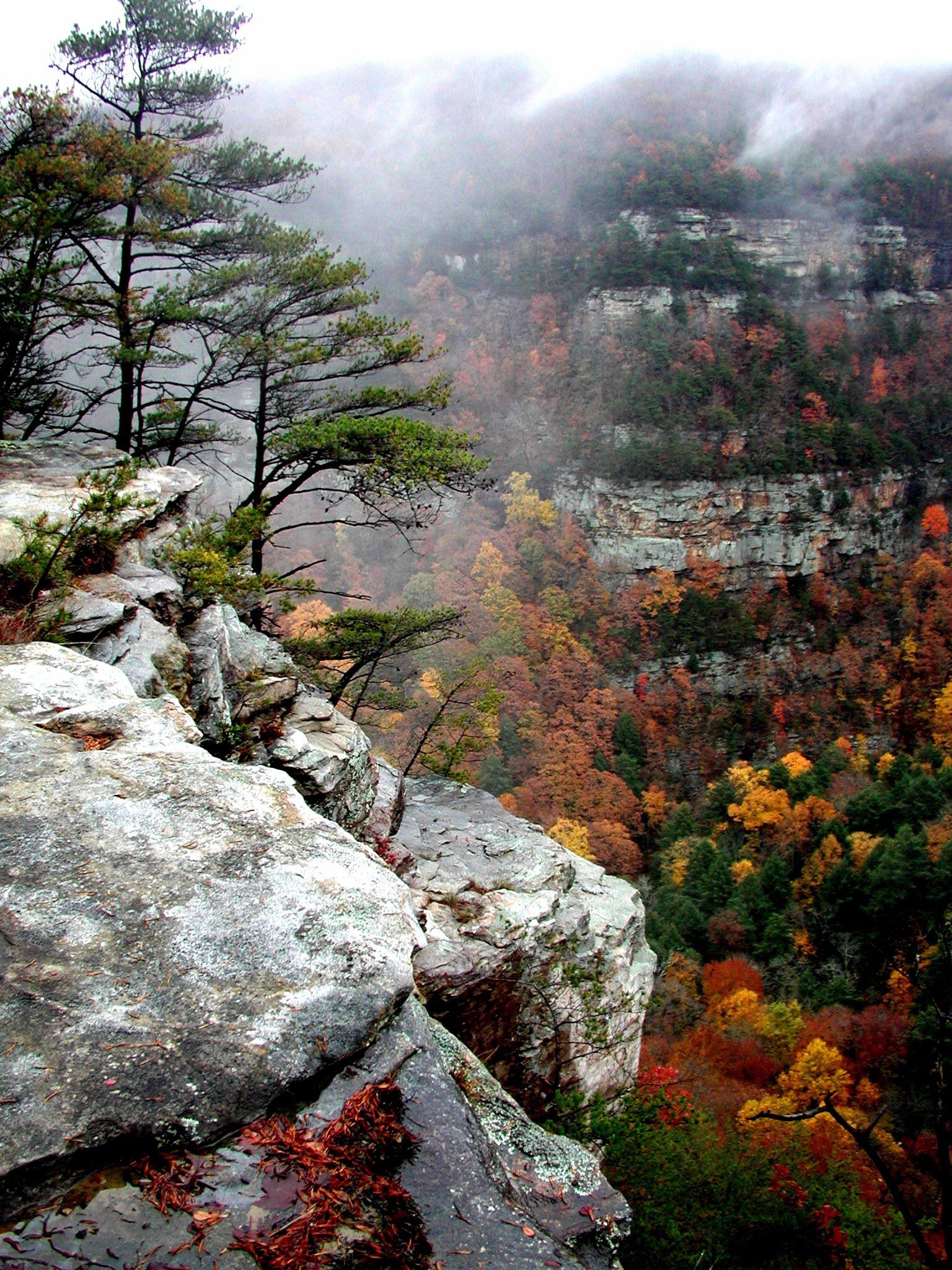
Cloudland Canyon as viewed from the top of the gorge

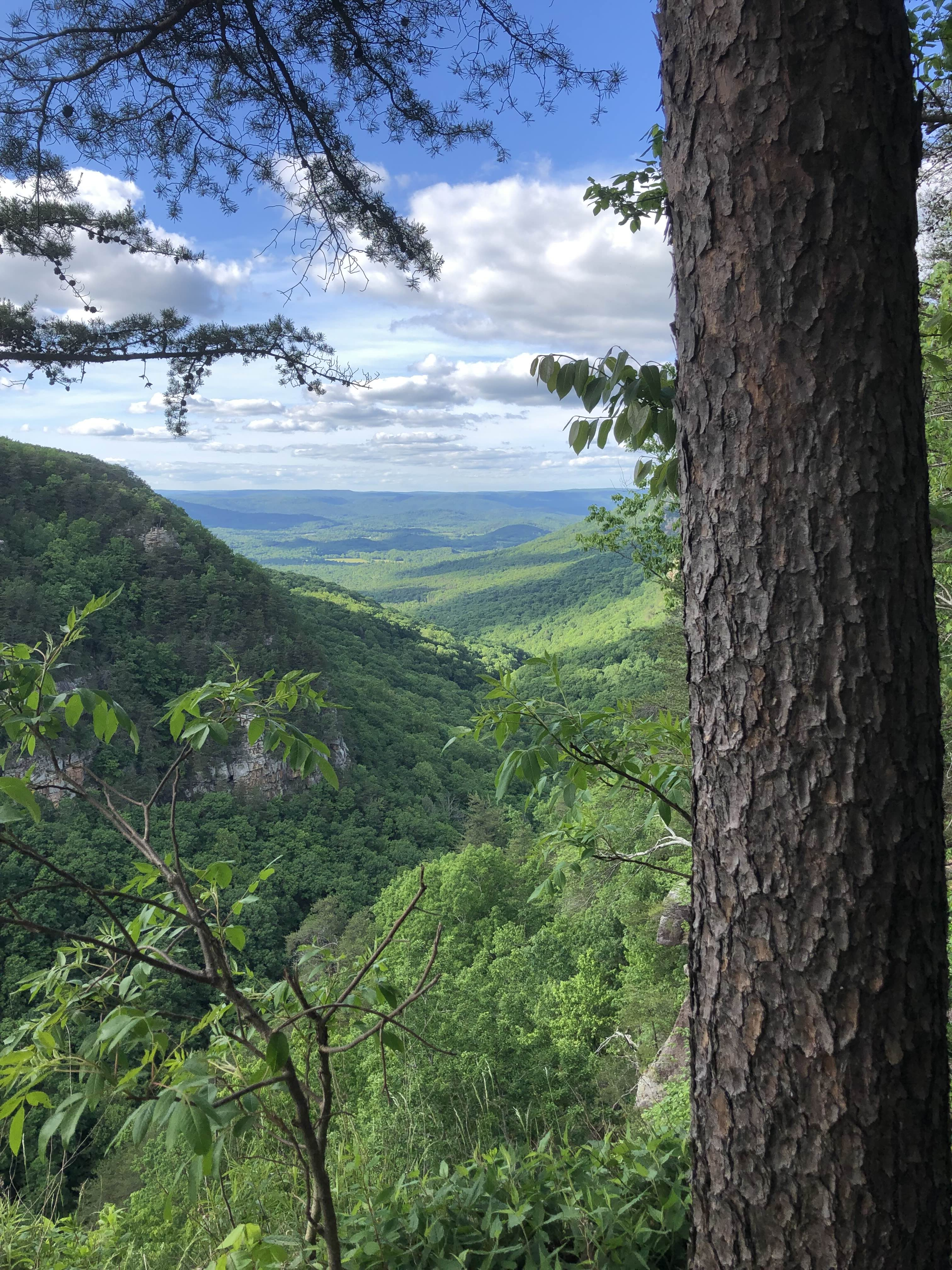
Cloudland Canyon from the Picket Post trail, near the Visitor Center.

The Park contains several well-marked trails which allow visitors to view the geology of the canyon and its surroundings. A paved, wheelchair-accessible trail about 0.25 miles (0.40 km) long overlooks the rim of the canyon. The park also features four more extensive hiking trails, including one backpacking trail. These trails are generally considered moderate in difficulty.

The Waterfalls Trail begins on a paved section, at the main overlook, and progresses into the canyon along a 40-degree slope. Most of the trail consists of gravel, and a 600-step staircase. Each waterfall emanates from Daniel Creek, and both cascade down sheer faces at 60 feet (18 m) and 90 feet (27 m). The trail is generally considered to be a strenuous hike, which can take up to 90 minutes to complete. Cherokee Falls is 0.3 miles (0.48 km) from the trailhead; Hemlock Falls, at the bottom of the canyon, appears at 0.5 miles (0.80 km). Each cascades into small pools at the base of the canyon, and continue down through a boulder-strewn stream bed. The creek flow feeding the waterfalls varies considerably according to the season. The Sitton's Gulch trail, commencing at the bottom of the Waterfalls Trail, runs parallel to the creek until it ends in a parking area in Trenton.

In contrast, the 4.8-mile (7.7 km) long West Rim Loop Trail is rated as moderately difficult, although it contains a few short, steep rocky sections. A scenic hike beginning at the Daniels Creek Bridge, it offers panoramic views before climbing out of the canyon and onto the plateau. This trail also provides views of Trenton, Georgia, neighboring Sand Mountain, and of Cloudland Canyon. Rhododendron and mountain laurel thickets are interspersed with sour gum and dogwood; large oaks, hickories, hemlocks and maples shade the trail. Cottages and walk-in camping areas are accessible via the West Rim Loop. Passing over varied terrain, most of the hike is moderately difficult, and is considered strenuous along several short sections.

The 2.0-mile (3.2 km) Backcountry Loop Trail provides access to the park's eleven secluded primitive hike-in camping sites. Beginning at the parking area for group camping, the trail passes through hemlock groves, before descending on a moderate grade into a hollow filled with spring and summer flowers. At the far end of the loop, hikers emerge from the hemlock groves onto level trail, among oaks and hickories, before returning to the parking area.

In the fall of 2011, the park reopened the Bear Creek Trail, which had been closed to hikers for nearly a decade. This approximately 9.0-mile (14.5 km) trail is the longest trail in the park. This trail begins as a spur off of the Back Country Trail and drops down to Bear Creek. After crossing the creek, the trail continues up until it becomes a loop around the northeast portion of the park. Around the area of the creek, the trail crosses over private property for a brief distance. During wet seasons, the creek crossing can be difficult as there is no bridge or dry crossing available.

In 2023, the 34-mile-long River to Clouds trail was announced, connecting Cloudland Canyon State Park to St. Elmo in Chattanooga.

== Facilities and activities ==
Cloudland Canyon State park features a variety of camping and lodging options. There are 16 rental cottages as well as a group lodge. The park also offers 62 tent, trailer and RV sites, 28 walk-in camp sites, and 10 backcountry camp sites for backpackers. Four pioneer campsites provide facilities for groups of tent campers. The East Rim has 24 camp sites located along a loop road; many of the sites can accommodate RVs, and all feature water and electric hookups. Bathing facilities are located nearby. The West Rim Camp ground, located across the gorge and away from the park's busiest section, is located in thick forest, and hosts approximately 48 camp sites spread along two loops. It too offers bathing facilities.

Picnic areas include a group pavilion, tennis courts, a children's playground and a disc golf course. The park has an interpretive center near the main parking lot, adjacent to the canyon. Annual events hosted in the park include a Wildflower Program in April, Adventure Weekend (also in April), and a Kids' Catfish Rodeo in May.

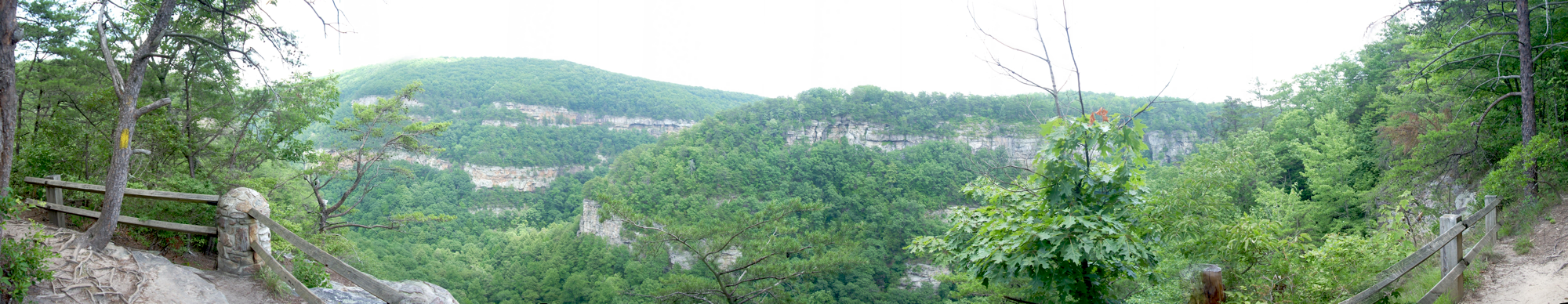
Cloudland Canyon as seen from the West Rim Loop Trail

== See also ==
- Lula Lake Land Trust

== Notes ==
=== References ===
- Brown, Fred; Nell Jones (1996). The Georgia Conservancy's Guide to The North Georgia Mountains (3rd ed.). Atlanta, GA: Longstreet Press. ISBN 1-56352-314-0.
- Molloy, Johnny (2007). The Best in Tent Camping: Georgia. Birmingham, AL: Menasga Ridge Press. ISBN 978-0-89732-724-4.
- Pfitzer, Donald W. (1993). Hiking Georgia (Second ed.). Helena, MT: Falcon Press.
- Pfitzer, Donald W. (2006). Hiking Georgia: A Guide to Georgia's Greatest Hiking Adventures. Globe Pequot Press. ISBN 978-0-7627-3642-3.

=== Further reading ===
- Griffin, Martha and Robert Atkins. Geologic Guide to Cloudland Canyon State Park. (Pamphlet available at Cloudland Canyon State Park)
- Homan, Tim (2001). The Hiking Trails of North Georgia. Atlanta: Peachtree Publishing. ISBN 978-1-56145-127-2.
- Molloy, John (2007). The Best in Tent Camping: Southern Appalachian and Smoky Mountains: A Guide for Car Campers Who Hate RVs, Concrete Slabs, and Loud Portable Stereos. Menasha Ridge Press. ISBN 978-0-89732-960-6.
