= Angel Falls (Georgia) =

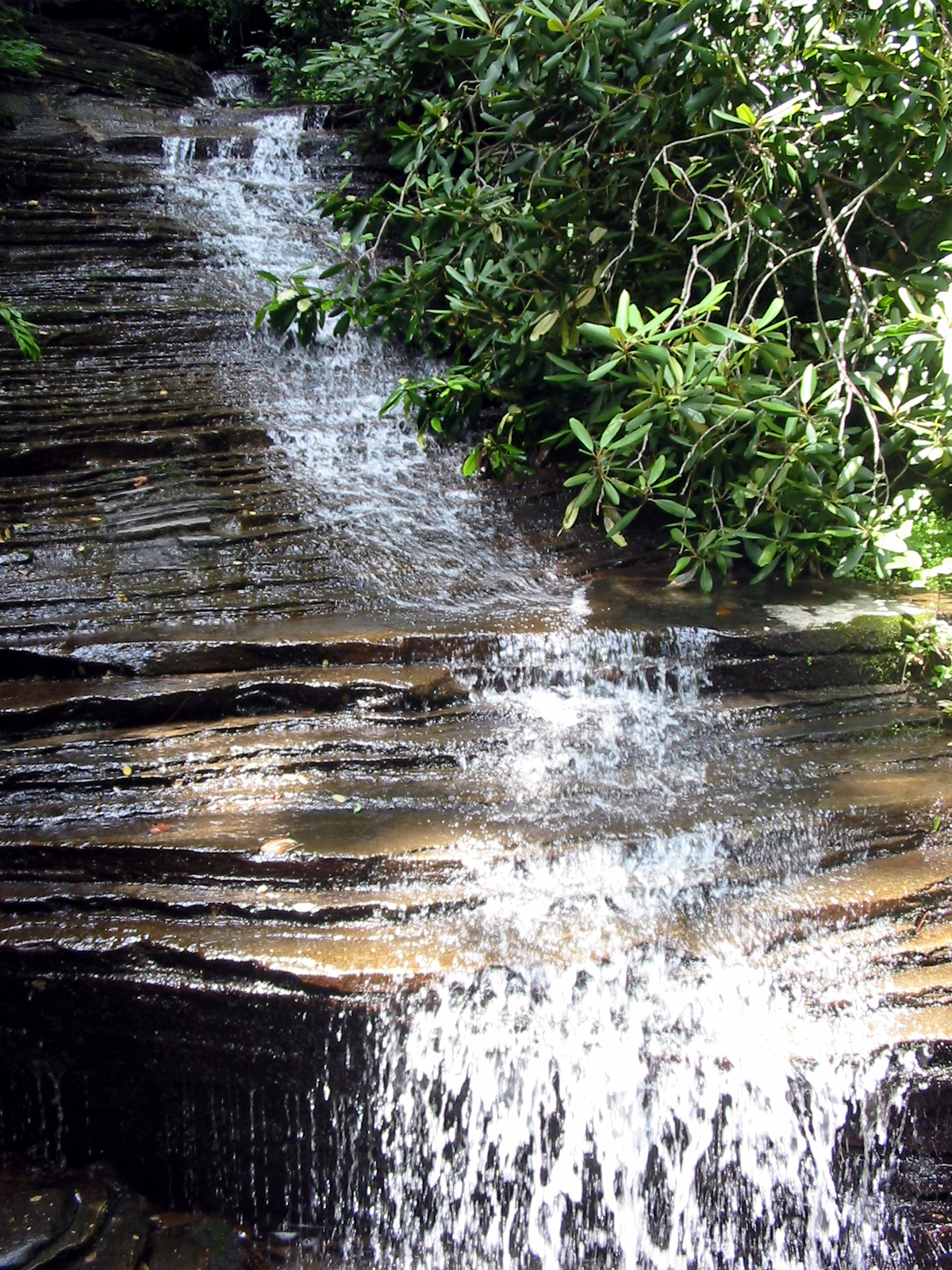
- Angel Falls in Rabun County, Georgia

- Location within Georgia
- Location: Rabun County, Georgia
- Coordinates: 34.760747°N 83.472222°W
- Type: Cascade
- Watercourse: Joe Branch Creek

Angel Falls is the second of two waterfalls on the Angel Falls Trail in Rabun County, Georgia, United States. The first waterfall on the trail is Panther Falls.

== See also ==
- List of waterfalls
- List of Waterfalls of Georgia (U.S. state)
