= Lula Lake Land Trust =

Land trust near Lookout Mountain, Georgia, US

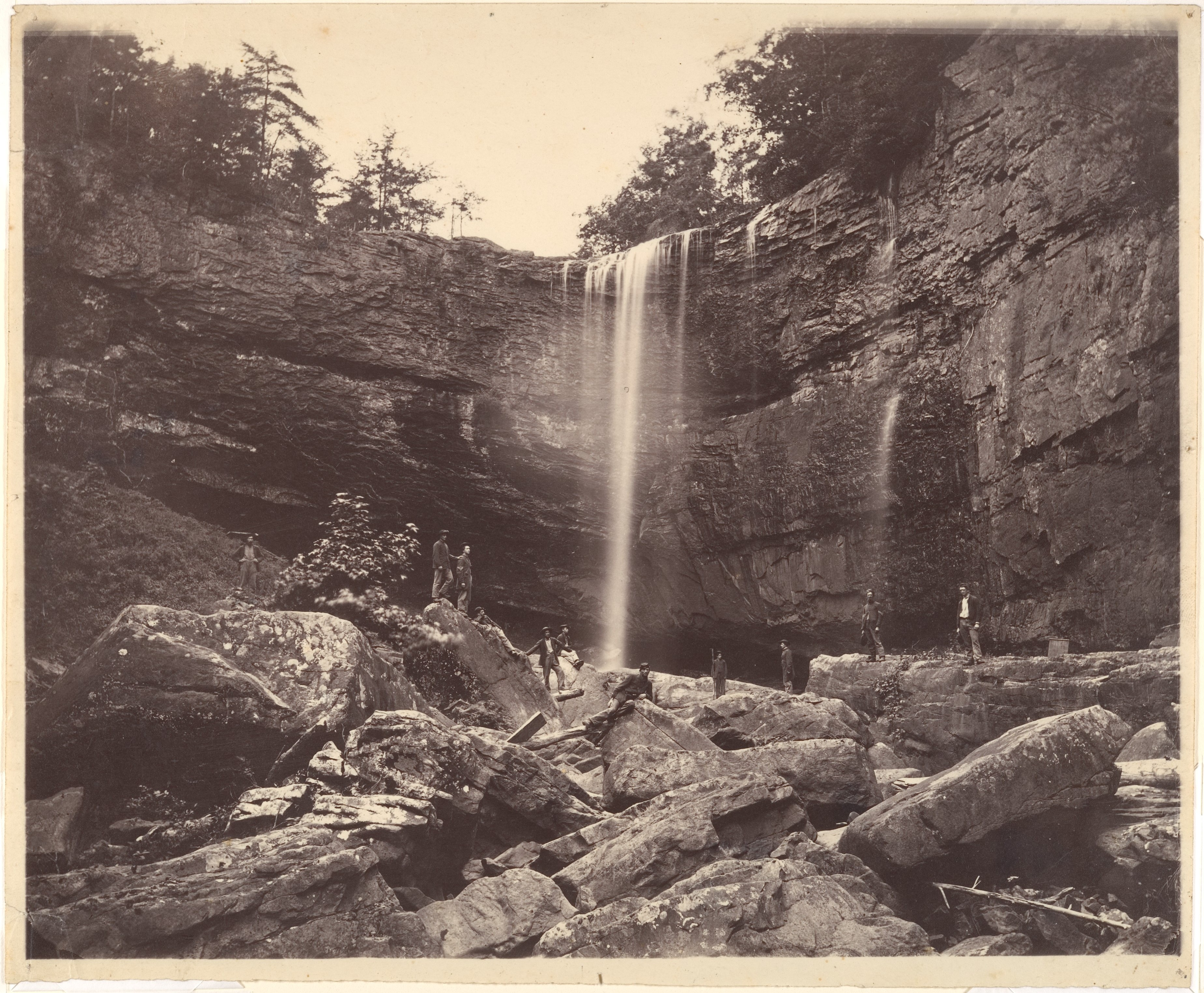
Albumen silver print from glass negative photograph of Lula Falls by Isaac H. Bonsall (1864 or 1865)

Lula Lake Land Trust is an 8,000 acre land trust that includes Lula Lake and Lula Falls in the area around Lookout Mountain, Georgia outside Chattanooga, Tennessee. The area includes hiking trails and viewpoints. The property is accessible on set days at 5000 Lula Lake Road. Changes to Open Gate Day operations and access were made in 2019 including an online reservation system and a $15 per car fee. To make a reservation, visit https://www.lulalake.org/events.html

== History ==
The land trust was established in 1994 by the will of Robert Davenport, Sr. His children Bobby, Elliott, Eleanor and Adelaide along with a Board of Trustees, local foundations, and staff have helped to conserve the area. They also helped double the size of Cloudland Canyon State Park and constructed nearly 60 miles of recreational trails.

The area is open to the public during set hours two weekends a month for a recreational fee. The area is used as a research sites for UTC, UGA, and the State of Georgia Forestry Division including projects to reintroduce the American Chestnut and control Hemlock woolly adelgid infestations affecting hemlock trees with chemical and biologic agents.

== Geographical features and amenities ==
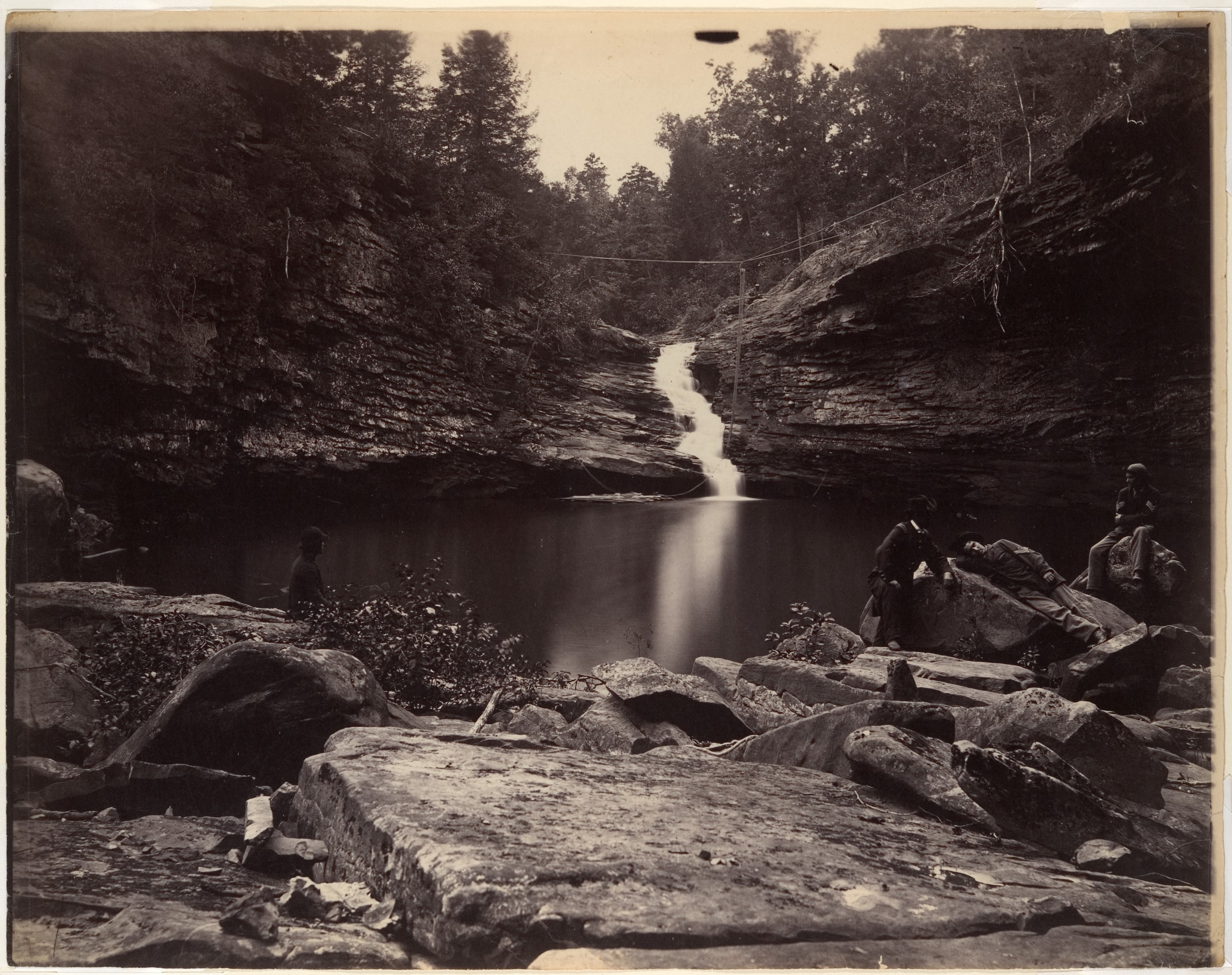
Upper Falls and Lula Lake in an Isaac H. Bonsall photograph

The property is in the Rock Creek and Bear Creek watersheds. Hiking trails access the 120-foot freefall at Lula Falls and 20-foot waterfall which feeds into an emerald colored lake. The area overlooks the Chattanooga Valley and includes an old railroad bed. Swimming in the lake is prohibited although wading in Rock Creek has been allowed in recent years. Other natural features include rock bridges and large boulders.

== See also ==
- Cloudland Canyon State Park
- Rock City (attraction)
- Ruby Falls
- Reflection Riding Arboretum and Nature Center

== Website ==
- Lula Lake Land Trust website
