= DeSoto Falls (Georgia) =

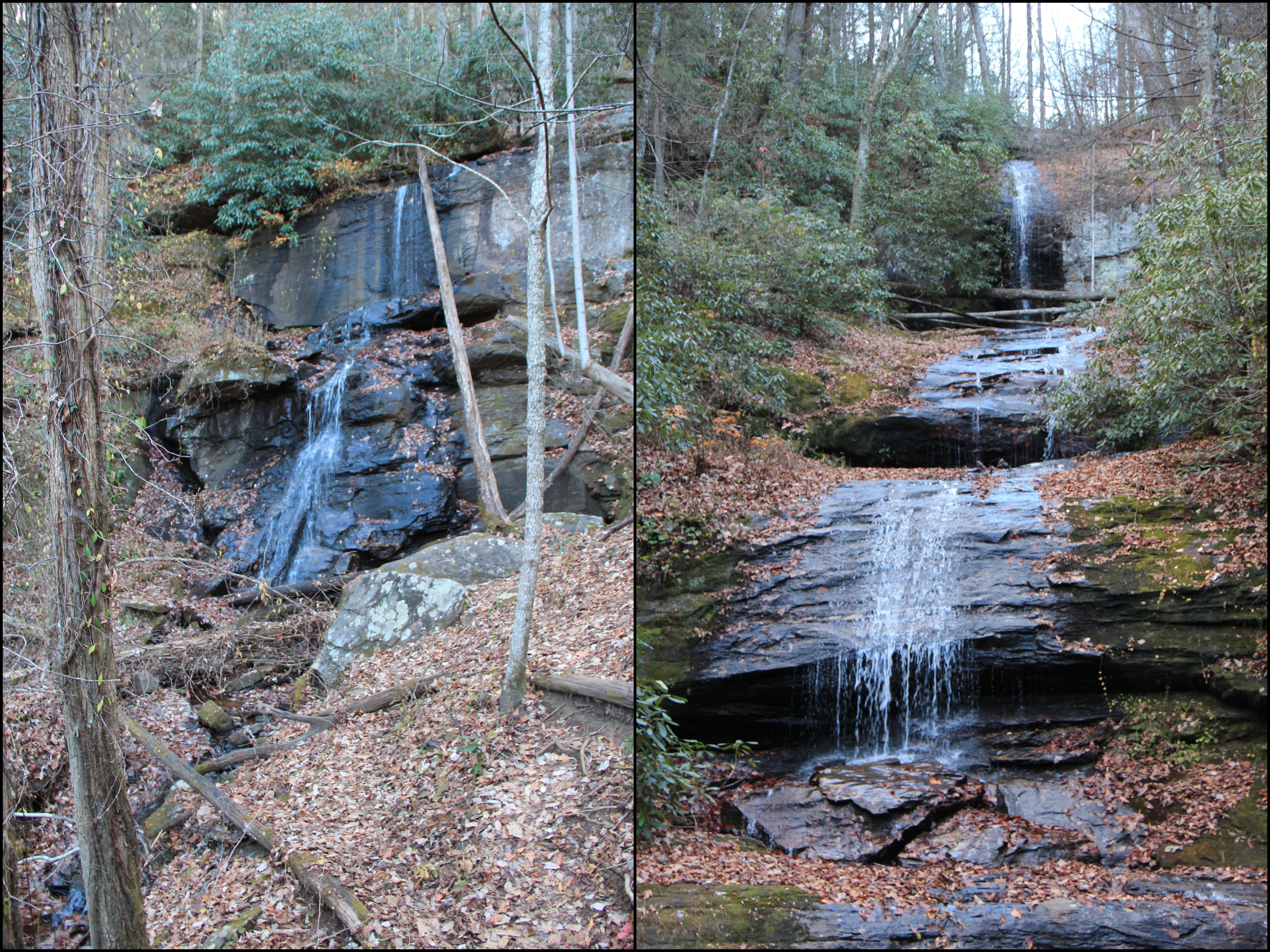
- Lower (left) and Upper (right) DeSoto Falls
- Interactive map of DeSoto Falls
- Location: Lumpkin County, Georgia
- Coordinates: 34°43′01″N 83°55′10″W
- Elevation: 3,560 feet (1,090 m)
- Total height: 200 feet (61 m) (upper); 90 feet (27 m) (middle); 35 feet (11 m) (lower)
- Watercourse: Frogtown Creek

The DeSoto Falls of Georgia are located in Lumpkin County, Georgia along Frogtown Creek. There are actually three waterfalls on Frogtown Creek, called Upper DeSoto Falls, Middle Desoto Falls and Lower DeSoto Falls. The upper waterfall drops 200 feet (61 m), the middle waterfall drops 67 feet (20 m) and the lower waterfall drops 35 feet (11 m). The overall height of the falls, as measured inclusive of non-vertical falls, cascades and steep stream bed, is 480 feet (150 m). DeSoto Falls are located at an elevation of 3,560-foot (1,090 m) on Rocky Mountain.

The DeSoto Falls are named for Spanish explorer Hernando deSoto, who passed through Georgia around 1540. According to a sign posted on the DeSoto Falls Trail, a 2.4-mile (3.9 km) in and out hiking trail to the falls, a plate of armor was discovered at the base of the falls in the 1880s.

The falls are part of the Chattahoochee National Forest and located in a 650-acre (2.6 km^{2}) area designated the Desoto Falls Scenic Area. There is also a campground located along the banks of Frogtown Creek. DeSoto Falls is one of four popular waterfalls in the Forest located near Helen, Georgia. The other three popular waterfalls are Anna Ruby Falls, Dukes Creek Falls and Raven Cliff Falls, all located in neighboring White County.

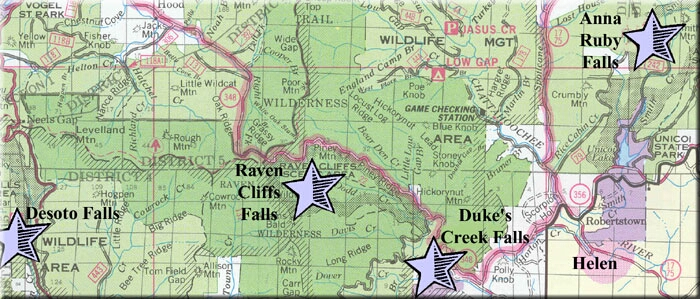
Map showing location of waterfalls near Helen, Georgia

== See also ==
- List of waterfalls
- List of Waterfalls of Georgia (U.S. state)
