= Blue Hole Falls =

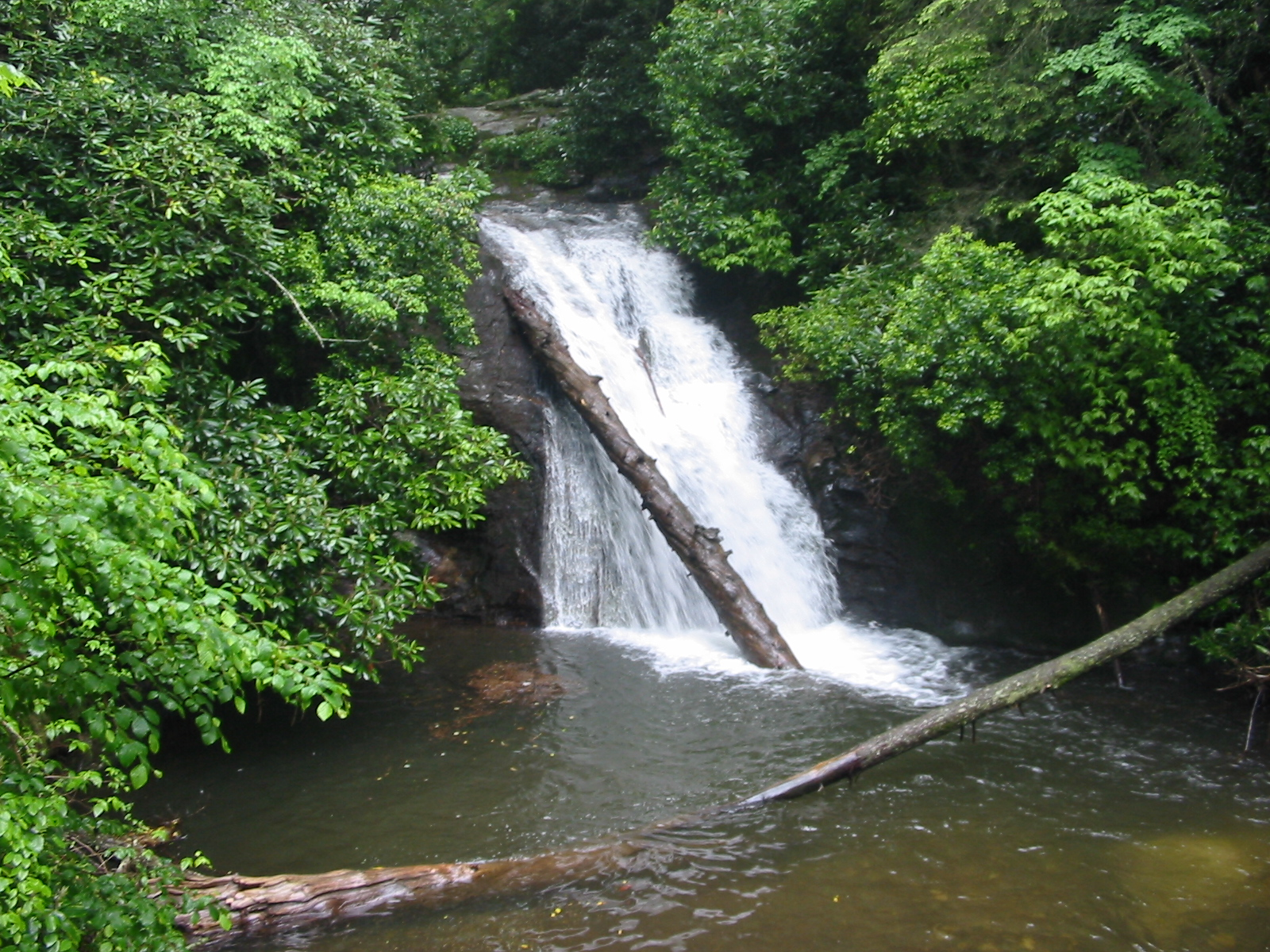
- Interactive map of Blue Hole Falls
- Location: Towns County, Georgia
- Coordinates: 34.8162°N 83.727°W
- Type: Cascade
- Total height: 7.62 m (25 ft)
- Watercourse: High Shoals Creek

Blue Hole Falls located on High Shoals Creek in the High Shoals Scenic Area of the Chattahoochee National Forest in Towns County, Georgia, United States.

The falls can be accessed via the High Shoals Trail, a well-maintained 1.2 mile trail to the larger High Shoals Creek Falls downstream. The trailhead is accessed via Indian Grave Gap Road (Forest Service Road 283), a gravel road located about 11.5 miles north of Helen, GA on GA Highway 17/75. The road fords a shallow creek about 100 yards from the entrance at GA Highway 17/75, but the ford does not require a four-wheel drive vehicle to cross under normal conditions.

To reach Blue Hole Falls requires a one-mile hike downhill via the High Shoals Trail. There are several easily identifiable primitive campsites with fire rings located between the latter half of the trail and High Shoals Creek that offer camping to large and small groups. A small observation deck overlooks the falls as they cascade into Blue Hole. Blue Hole reaches depths of more than ten feet, and is a common destination for swimmers, hikers, and campers during the summer months, when the creek temperature remains in the 40s Fahrenheit.
