= Chattooga River =

River in the southeastern US

Chattooga River Chatuga
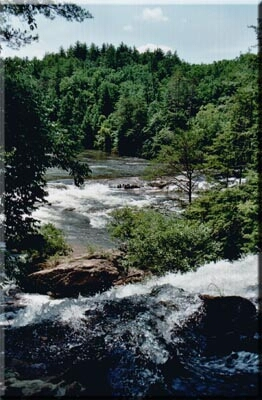
- Chattooga River near Dick's Creek Falls

Location
- Country: United States
- States: North Carolina, South Carolina, Georgia

Physical characteristics
- Source: Chattooga River
  - location: Cashiers, North Carolina
  - coordinates: 35°07′08″N 83°07′05″W
  - elevation: 1,187 m (3,894 ft)
- Mouth: Tugaloo River
  - location: Tallulah Falls, Georgia
  - coordinates: 34°43′01″N 83°21′11″W
  - elevation: 279 m (915 ft)
- Length: 57 mi (92 km)
- Basin size: 721.5 km^{2} (278.6 sq mi)

Basin features
- Progression: Tugaloo River → Savannah River → Atlantic Ocean
- River system: Savannah River

National Wild and Scenic River
- Type: Wild, Scenic, Recreational
- Designated: May 10, 1974

The Chattooga River (also spelled Chatooga, Chatuga, and Chautaga, variant name Guinekelokee River) is the main tributary of the Tugaloo River in the United States.

== Water course ==
The headwaters of the Chattooga River are located southwest of Cashiers, North Carolina, and it stretches 57 miles (92 km) to its confluence with the Tallulah River within Lake Tugalo, which was created by the Tugalo Dam. The Chattooga begins in southern Jackson County, North Carolina, and flows southwestward between northwestern Oconee County, South Carolina, and eastern Rabun County, Georgia. The "Chattooga" spelling was approved by the US Board on Geographic Names in 1897.

The Chattooga and the Tallulah rivers combine to make the Tugaloo River, which is considered to start at the outlet of Lake Tugalo. Downriver from the Tugaloo's confluence with the Seneca River, it is known as the Savannah River below Lake Hartwell. Downstream from that point, the water flows into the Atlantic Ocean near Savannah, Georgia.

The Chattooga was the model for the fictional 'Cahulawassee River' in James Dickey's novel, Deliverance (1970). Scenes for the 1972 film of the same name with Jon Voight, Burt Reynolds, Ned Beatty and Ronny Cox were shot along the Chattooga River.

== Geology ==
The Chattooga River serves as part of the boundary between Georgia and South Carolina near latitude 35°N. The Chattooga was not the original boundary line between South Carolina and Georgia. A treaty of 1816 between the United States and the Cherokee extended the South Carolina boundary to its current location. Prior to 1816, the Chattooga flowed through the ancient homeland of the Cherokee Indian Nation. A Cherokee town known as Chattooga was located along the upper river. The people were forced to cede this territory to the United States.

The Blue Ridge Mountains, where the Chattooga starts, are considered to be ancient, even by geological standards. The rock is mostly granite. Geologists believe that the Chattooga may have made one direction change during its life. Originally, it probably flowed southwesterly into the Chattahoochee River and on to the Gulf of Mexico. At some point, the Savannah River eroded its northern headland until it captured the Chattooga and diverted its waters to the Atlantic.

The rocks in the riverbed probably fell from the ridge above, but such rocks do not necessarily remain where they fall. In times of great downpours, high water, and fast currents, rocks can become dislodged and move downstream, taking other rocks and debris with them. During Hurricane Ivan in 2004, the wind force and waters knocked big boulders off the banks of the river. The hurricane dropped so much water in the Chattooga watershed that the river was recorded at its highest flow rate, around 26,000 cu ft/s (740 m^{3}/s) to 28,000 cu ft/s (790 m^{3}/s), rivaling the typical flow of the Colorado River in the Grand Canyon.

== Wild and Scenic River ==
Since May 10, 1974, the Chattooga River has been protected along a 15,432-acre (6,245 ha) corridor as a national Wild and Scenic River. 39.8 miles (64.1 km) of the river have been designated “wild”, about 2.5 miles (4.0 km) “scenic”, and 14.6 miles (23.5 km) “recreational” for a total of about 57 miles (92 km). On the commercially rafted sections (III and IV) there is a 1/4 mile protected corridor of National Forest on both sides of the river, allowing no roads to the river or development of any kind. There are a few areas on the river where access has been made more accessible on Section III, but much of Section IV is fairly remote. The Chattooga also bisects the Ellicott Rock Wilderness which straddles three states (Georgia, North Carolina and South Carolina) and three National Forests (the Chattahoochee, Nantahala and Sumter National Forests). The Georgia portion of the river is in the Chattooga River Ranger District of the Chattahoochee National Forest.

Known as the "Crown Jewel" of the southeast, the Chattooga was the first river east of the Mississippi to be granted the Wild & Scenic designation, and is still the only one that is commercially rafted.

== Tributaries ==
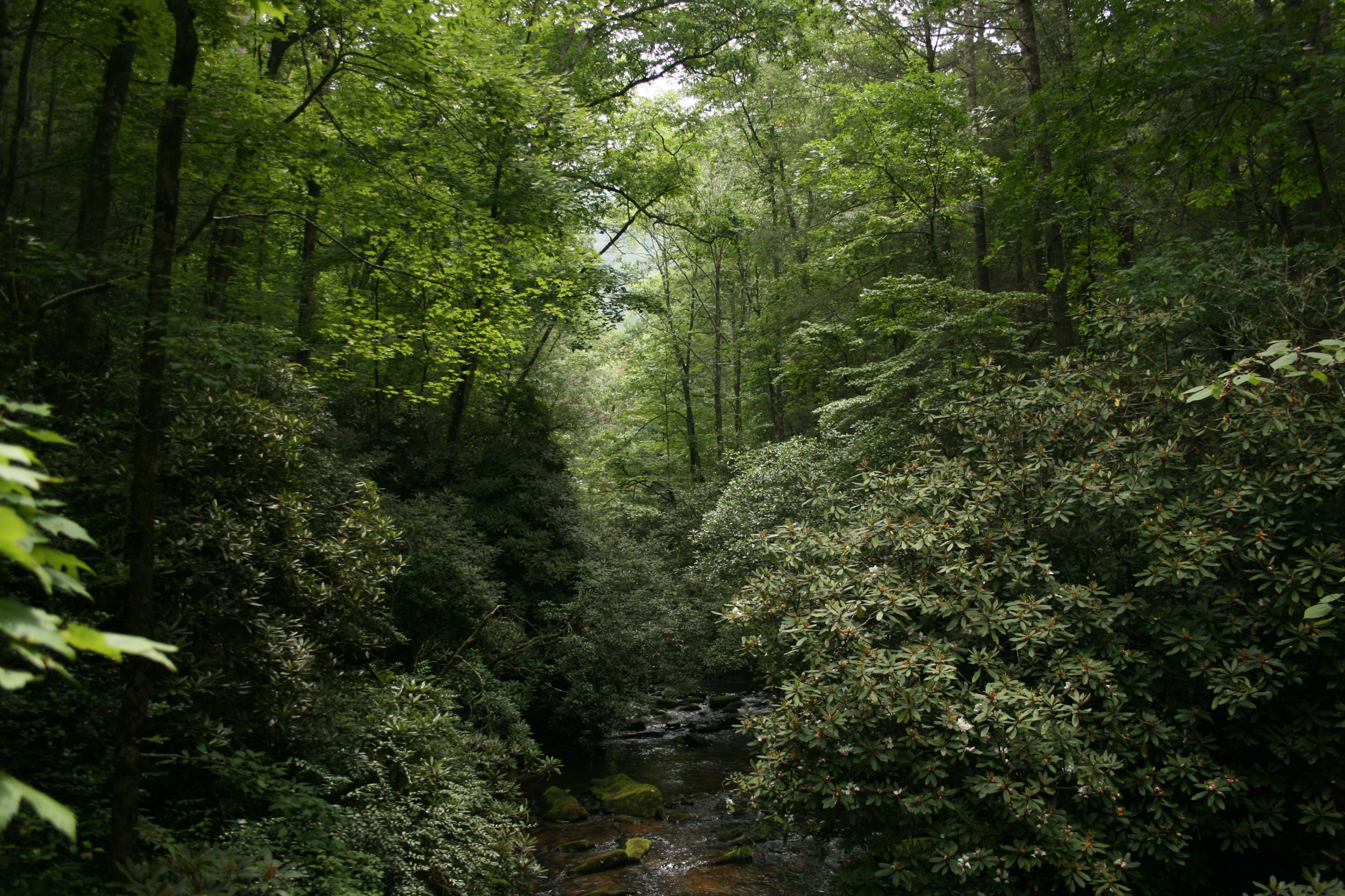
Headwaters of the East Fork

The river is split into three forks. The Chattooga River is the main fork, running along the state line. The East Fork Chattooga River (sometimes East Prong Chattooga River) runs in from Jackson County, North Carolina and then Oconee County, South Carolina, and is 7.4 miles (11.9 km) long. The West Fork Chattooga River (variant name Gumekoloke Creek) runs 6.0 miles (9.7 km) in from Rabun County, Georgia, and is also a variant name for that county's Holcomb Creek, one of its own tributaries.

One of the largest tributaries in the Chattooga basin that flows mainly through private lands is Stekoa Creek, which flows primarily southeast for approximately 18 miles (29 km) from its headwaters in Mountain City, Georgia, through Clayton, Georgia, to its mouth at the Chattooga River. Stekoa Creek has been identified as the single greatest threat to the Chattooga's water quality. This is due primarily to raw sewage leaking from the City of Clayton's old sewage collection system, overflowing storm drains, runoff laden with sediment, poor agricultural practices, failing septic systems, and illegal dumping. Non-profit organizations, such as the Chattooga Conservancy, have made improving water quality in Stekoa Creek a top priority. The Stekoa Creek Basin is approximately 45 square miles (120 km^{2}) in size.

== Rafting and boating ==
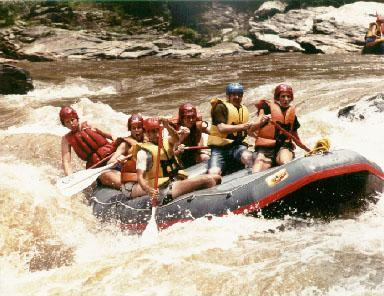
Whitewater rafting

In the late spring, the river is lined with blooming pink and white mountain laurel. Early spring is also a great time to go rafting, kayaking, or canoeing because of the higher flows and cooler temperatures. The Chattooga is a free-flowing river (no upstream dam to control the flow) which quickly responds to rainfall or drought conditions. As a drop-pool style river, rapids are followed by calm pools for swimming.

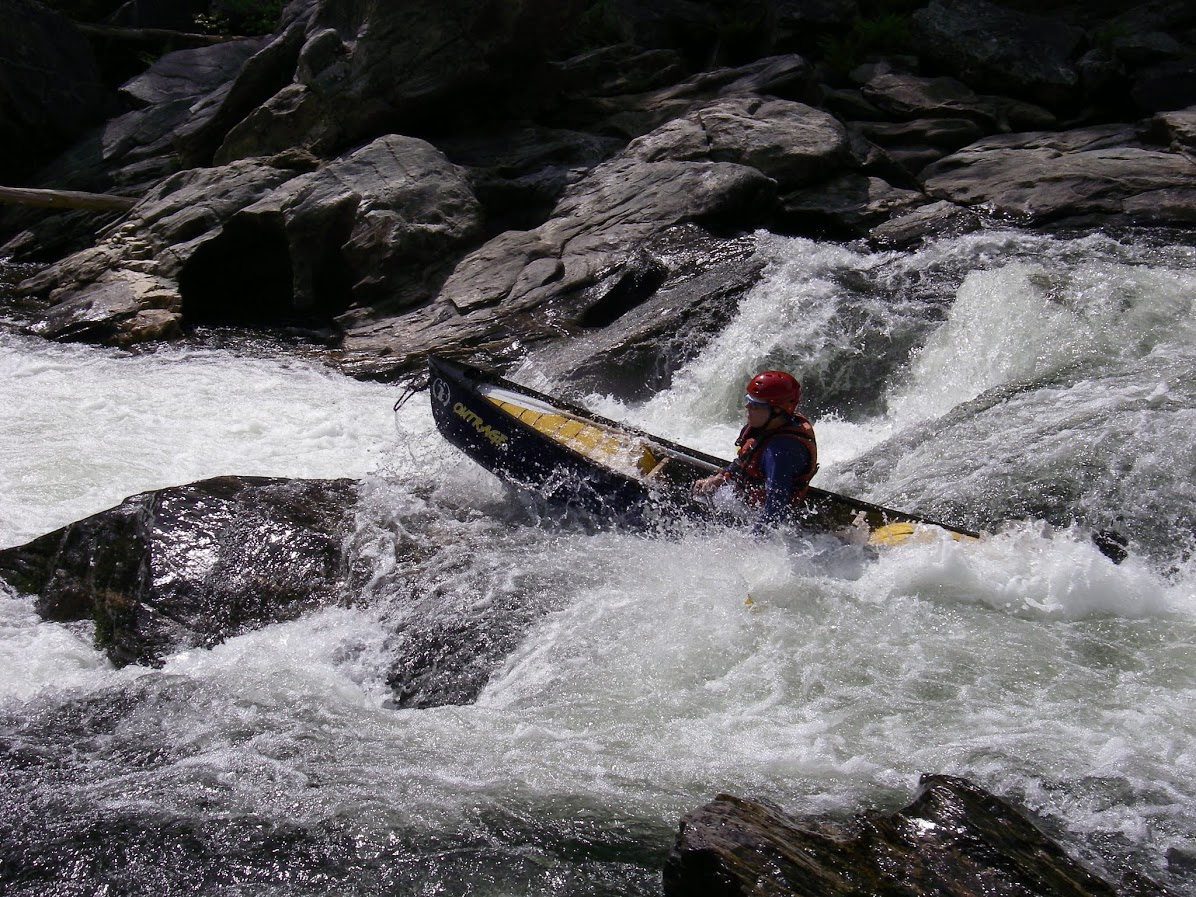
Whitewater Canoeing on the Chattooga River

The Chattooga headwaters are located in the Whiteside Mountain area on the Blue Ridge escarpment near Cashiers, NC. Flowing through Cashiers as a small stream, the upper stretches (Sections 00, 0, and 1) are excellent trout waters and, depending on water level, are either not boatable or restricted. Section 1, beginning at Burrell's Ford, is very hazardous and restricted to certain months and water levels. The West Fork, sometimes incorrectly referred to as Section 1, is ideal for tubing and class II float trips. It begins at the Overflow Road Bridge and terminates at the Section 2 put-in. Section 2, starting at Highway 28, is a class II float. Section 3 has Class II-IV rapids which rafters and kayakers frequent. The final rapid in Section 3 is Bull Sluice. Section 4 includes Class II-V rapids, including the famous Five Falls (five class III-V rapids in roughly a 1/4 mile stretch). The minimum age requirement to raft Section 3 is eight, and Section 4 is twelve. A number of signature rapids on this river were featured in the motion picture Deliverance.

The Forest Plan, issued in 1976 and revised in January 2004, restricted motorized craft, closed many roads to the river, and prohibited floating on the upper 21 miles (34 km) of river. This plan was challenged by several boating advocacy groups, causing the United States Forest Service to withdraw the plan of 2004 and ordering a Visitor Use Capacity Analysis.

The USFS issued its final decision in January 2012. The decision expanded boating onto some sections of the upper Chattooga, including Section 1, with a number of restrictions based on season, section of river, property ownership, time of day, and water level. The decision has proved controversial due to the excessive number of deaths that have occurred on the river in this area. Boating remains illegal above Greens Creek and below Licklog Creek. This section is difficult, commonly contains flood debris, flows infrequently, and will likely see limited whitewater use.
