= Caledonia Cascade =

Waterfall in Georgia, United States

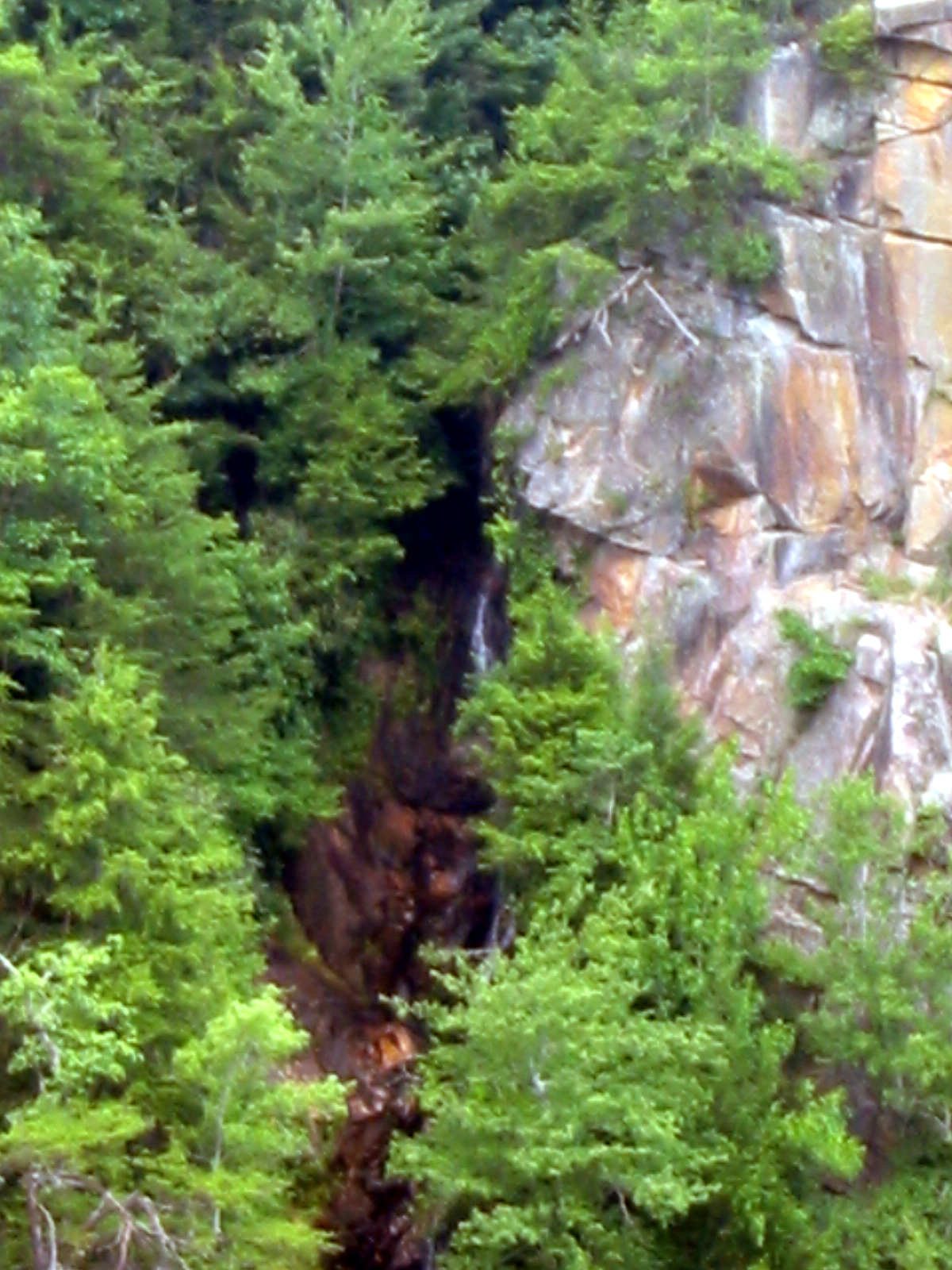
- Interactive map of Caledonia Cascade
- Location: Rabun County, Georgia, United States
- Coordinates: 34°44′24″N 83°23′19″W
- Type: Tiered
- Total height: 600 feet (180 m)

Caledonia Cascade, sometimes called Cascade Falls, is a 600-foot (180 m) waterfall located in Rabun County, Georgia, US, near the town of Tallulah Falls. This waterfall occurs on a small stream that drops into the Tallulah Gorge near the beginning of the gorge. This tiered waterfall features three drops, the longest of which is 262 feet (80 m). It is best viewed from the hiking trail around the rim of the Tallulah Gorge. After Amicalola Falls, Cascade Falls is the second tallest waterfall in Georgia (tied with Cochrans Falls).

== See also ==
- List of waterfalls
- List of Waterfalls of Georgia (U.S. state)
