= Panther Falls (Georgia) =

Coordinates: 34°46′05″N 83°28′38″W

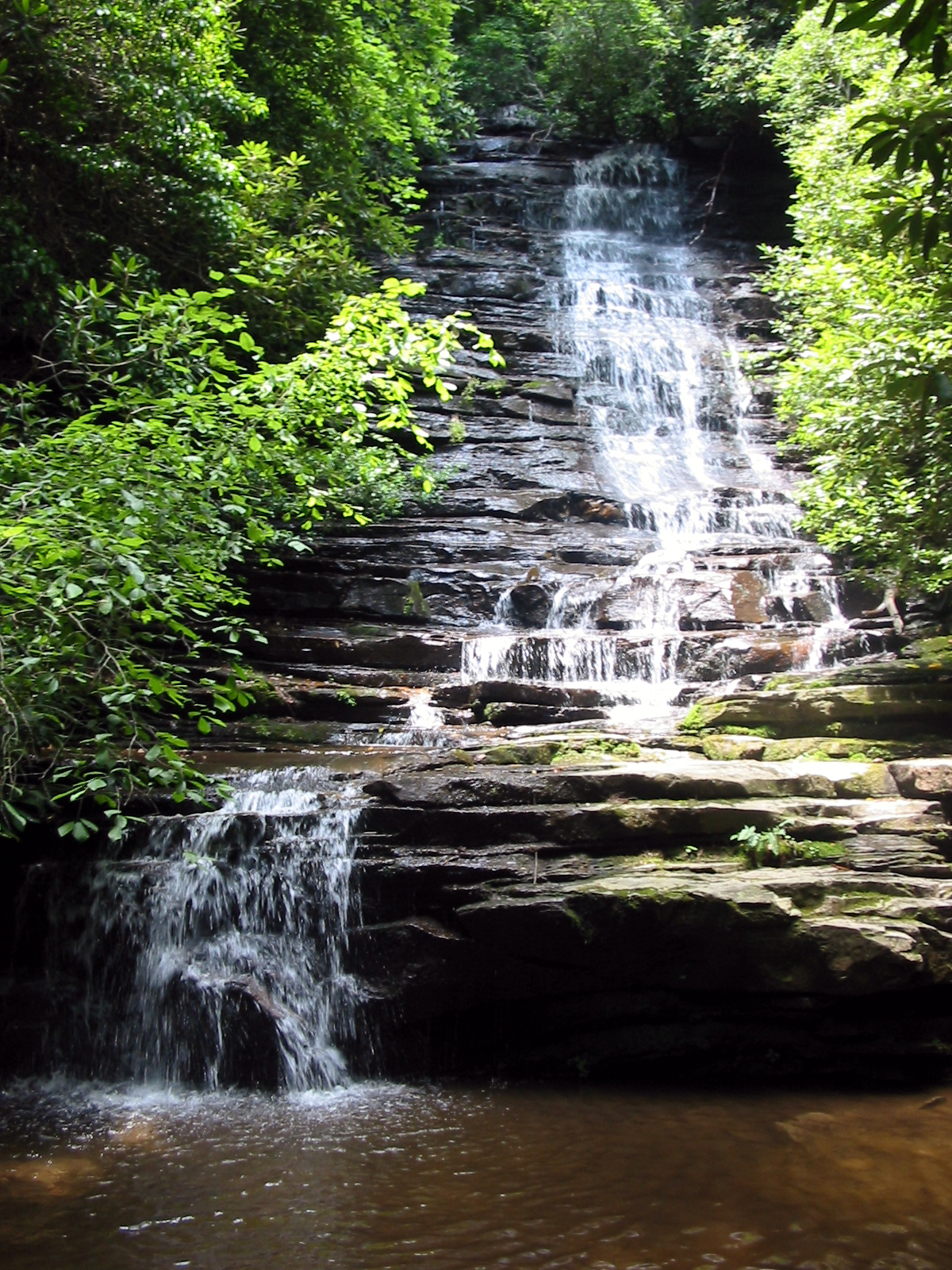
- Interactive map of Panther Falls
- Location: Rabun County, Georgia
- Type: Cascade
- Watercourse: Joe Branch Creek

Panther Falls is the first of two waterfalls on the Angel Falls Trail in Rabun County, Georgia, United States. The second waterfall on the trail is Angel Falls. The falls are each about 50 feet (15 m) in height on Joe Branch Creek. The trail begins at the Rabun Beach Camping Area #2 and is a moderately strenuous 0.5 mile hike to Panther Falls with Angel Falls an additional 0.5 mile.

== See also ==
- List of waterfalls
