= Bull Sluice =

Rapid on the Chattooga River, United States

Coordinates: 34.815°N 83.307°W

View of Bull Sluice from South Carolina bank

Bull Sluice is a prominent rapid on the Chattooga River on the Georgia and South Carolina border in the United States which was featured in the film Deliverance. Its convenient location off of the US76 bridge makes it a popular destination for whitewater rafters and kayakers. The short hike to the rapid also makes it attractive to spectators. The Bull Sluice area is also a popular swimming hole, and is visited by dozens of swimmers on summer weekends. Swimmers can jump into the rapid, battle the current, or simply relax in the slower water on the S.C. side. Even small children regularly visit to play in the calm water at the edges. There is also a sandy beach a few hundred feet below the rapid. A sandy beach also appears just below Bull Sluice during low water.

Bull Sluice is a benchmark Class IV+ rapid as rated by American Whitewater during normal flow of 1.8 to 2.4 feet. It becomes easier at lower water and significantly more difficult at higher water. Bull Sluice is the largest and final named rapid of Section 3 of the Chattooga River. Since it is one of the more accessible rapids on the river, many boaters who run the narrower and more dangerous Section 4 will first run Bull Sluice before continuing downstream, making the rapid the de facto start of the final section of the river.

A small cave exists under the main flow of the water. Swimmers will often enter the cave during warmer weather to watch boaters run the rapid above them.
