= Ada-Hi Falls =

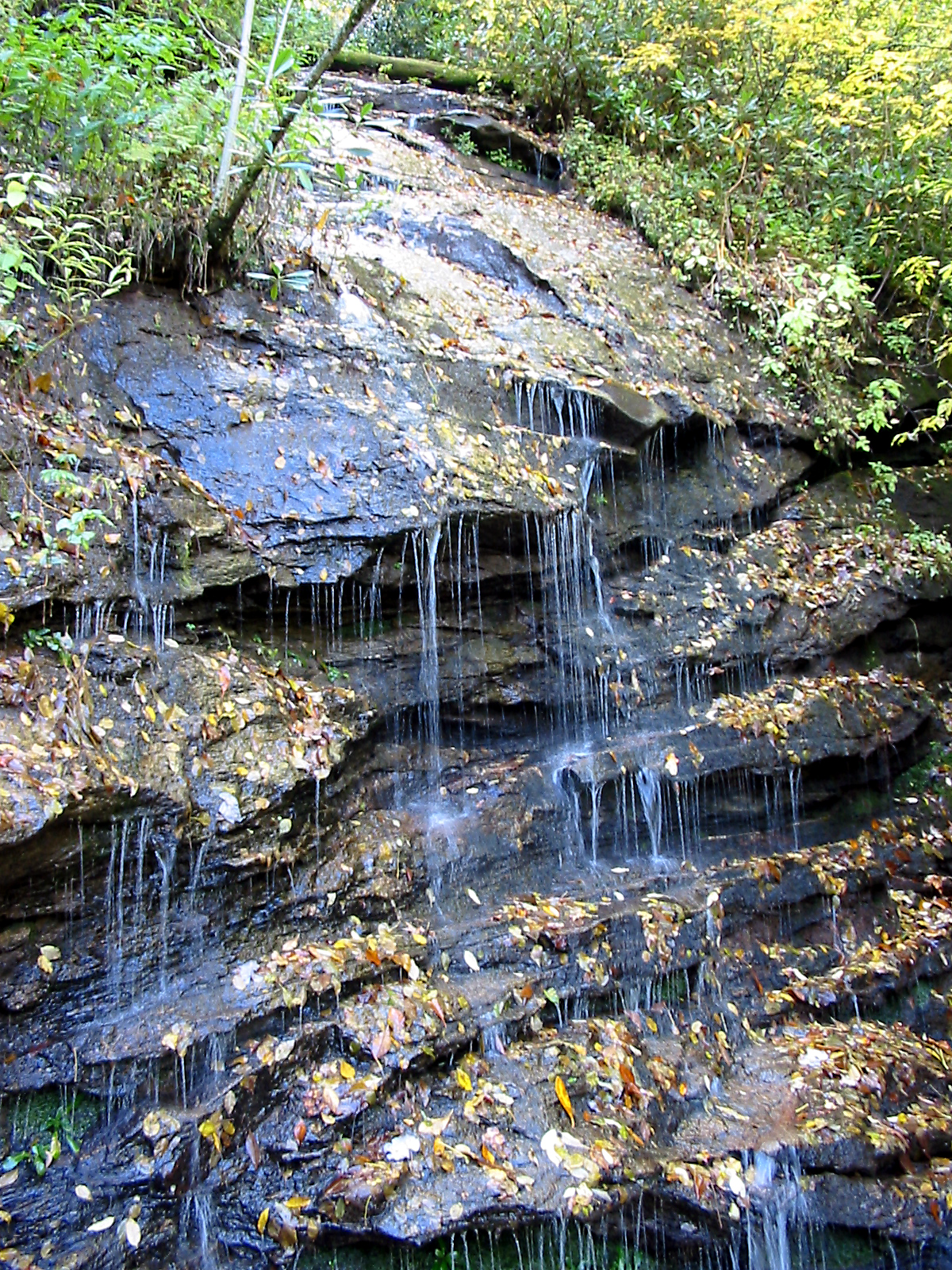

- Location within Georgia
- Location: Rabun County, Georgia
- Coordinates: 34°54′39″N 83°24′42″W
- Type: Horsetail
- Total height: 35 ft (11 m)
- Watercourse: Taylor Creek

Ada-Hi Falls (pronounced Uh-dah`'he) is located within Black Rock Mountain State Park in Rabun County, Georgia, United States. The name is derived from Ꭰꮩꭿ (A-do-hi), the Cherokee word for "forest." It is the highest elevation waterfall in the state. The amount of water present is highly variable due to its high elevation. The falls are surrounded by a forest of rhododendron. A short, yet steep hike, ends at an observation deck.
