= Cochrans Falls =

Waterfall in Georgia, United States

Coordinates: 34°34′46″N 84°12′50″W

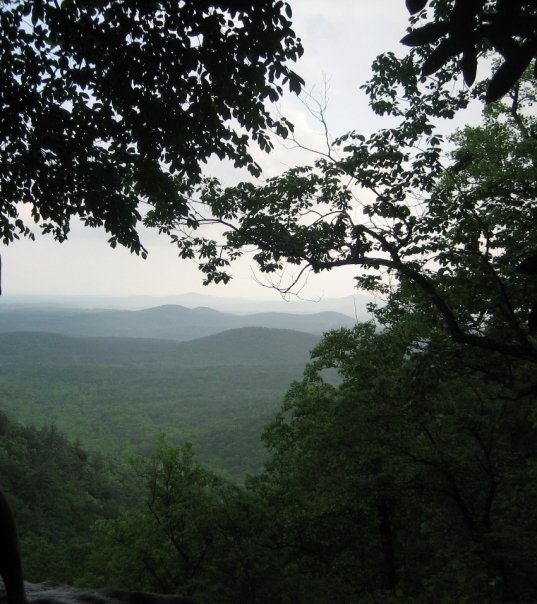
The view from on top of Cochran Falls.

With a total vertical drop of 600 feet (180 meters), Cochrans Falls is tied with Caledonia Cascade as the second tallest waterfall in Georgia. This cascading waterfall is located in Dawson County, northwest of Dawsonville, Georgia, and is in the vicinity of the tallest waterfall in the state, Amicalola Falls. The largest drop is near the top of Cochrans Falls and is accessible by a treacherous trail that ascends the right side of the falls.

== See also ==
- List of waterfalls
