= Cooper Heights, Georgia =

Unincorporated community in Georgia, US

Coordinates: 34°48′26″N 85°23′21″W

Cooper Heights is an unincorporated community in Walker County, in the U.S. state of Georgia.

== History ==
A post office called Cooper Heights was established in 1891, and remained in operation until it was discontinued in 1951. The community was named for Eliphalet Cooper, a local settler.
