= Darnell Falls =

- Location within Georgia
- Location: Rabun County, Georgia
- Coordinates: 34.983433°N 83.266835°W
- Type: Cascade
- Total height: 30 ft (9.1 m)
- Watercourse: Darnell Creek

Darnell Falls is a waterfall located in the Chattahoochee National Forest in Rabun County, Georgia that cascades for over 30 feet. A short hiking trail provides access to the falls.
