= Forest plans =

In the United States conservation policy, forest plans are land and resource management plans for units of the National Forest System under the Forest and Rangeland Renewable Resources Planning Act of 1974 (P.L. 93-378) and the National Forest Management Act (P.L. 94-588). The Acts specify a detailed process and numerous requirements, including public participation and periodic revision, intended to achieve multiple use and sustained yield of the national forests.
