= Stekoa Creek =

Stream in Georgia, U.S.

Coordinates: 34°47′22.33″N 83°19′27.58″W

Stekoa Creek is a stream in the U.S. state of Georgia. It is a tributary to the Chattooga River.

The name Stekoa is Cherokee in origin. Variant names are "Chechero Creek", "Stecoah Creek", and "Sticoa Creek".
