= Cherokee Falls =

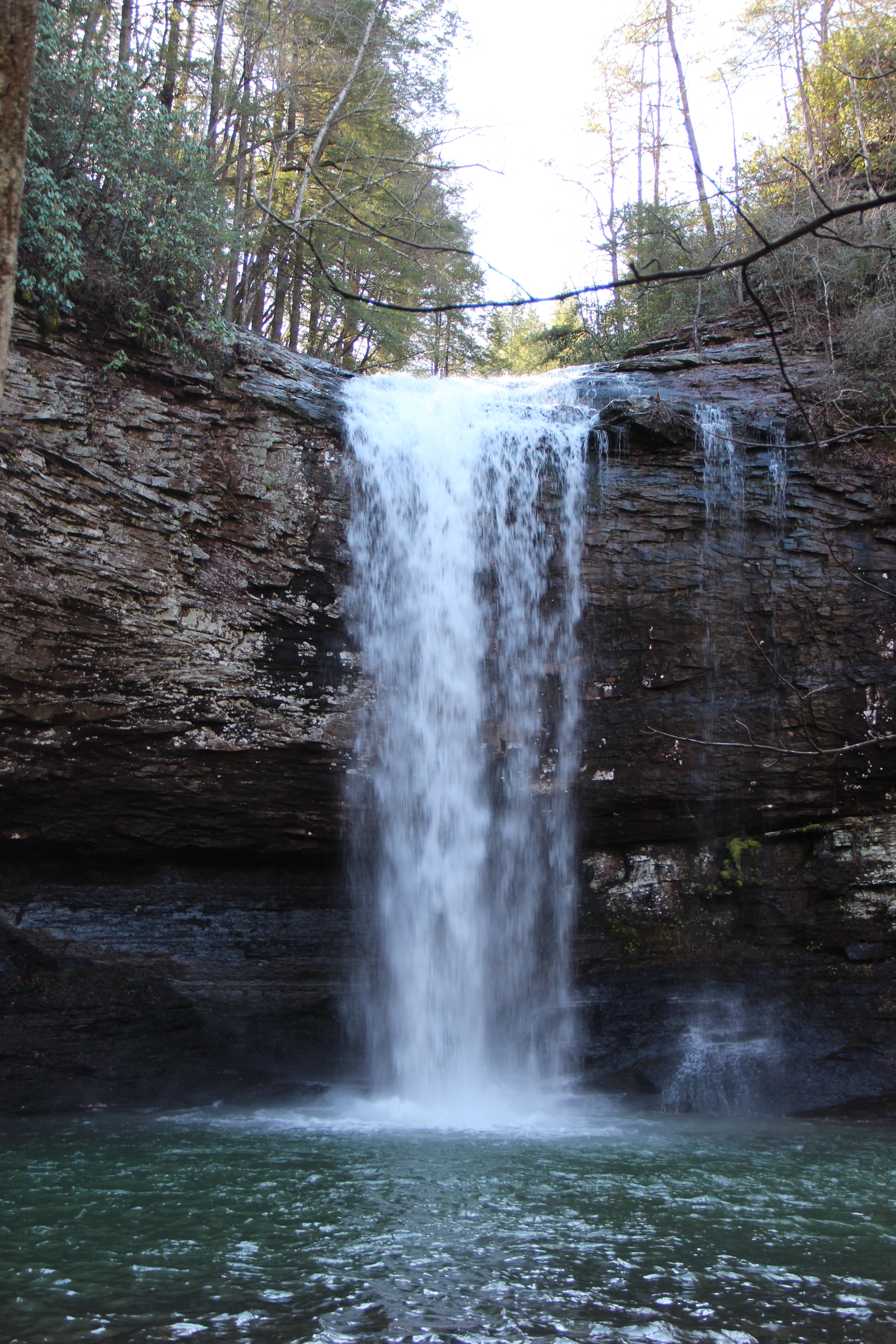
- Interactive map of Cherokee Falls
- Location: Dade County, Georgia
- Coordinates: 34.834209°N 85.484155°W
- Type: Plunge
- Total height: 60 feet (18 m)
- Watercourse: Daniel Creek

Cherokee Falls is a waterfall located in Cloudland Canyon State Park in Dade County, Georgia. The waterfall, formerly unnamed, was named in a contest.

== See also ==
- Hemlock Falls
- Cloudland Canyon State Park
- List of waterfalls
