= Hemlock Falls (Cloudland Canyon) =

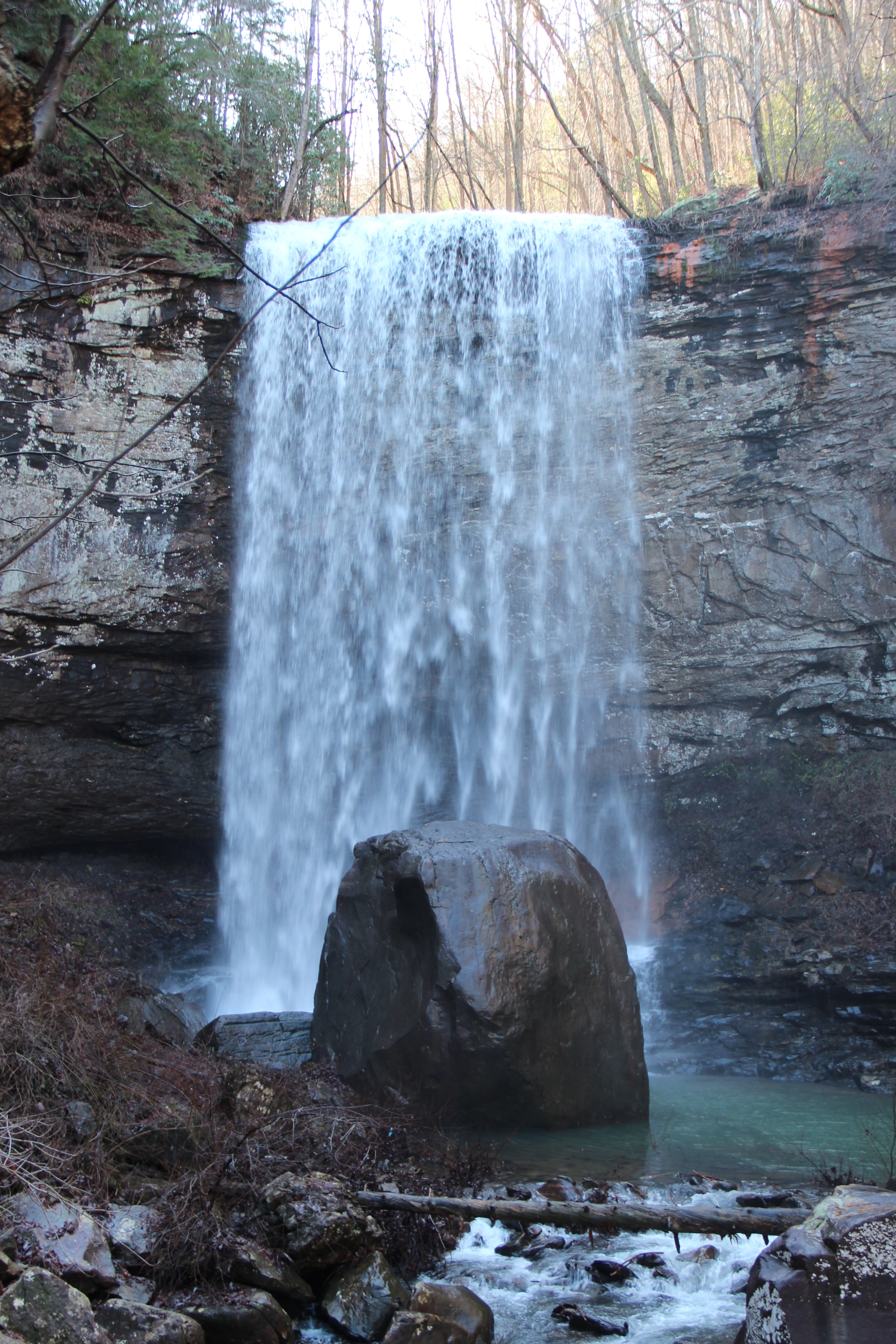
- Interactive map of Hemlock Falls
- Location: Dade County, Georgia
- Coordinates: 34.835489°N 85.482275°W
- Type: Plunge
- Total height: 90 feet (27 m)
- Watercourse: Daniel Creek

Hemlock Falls is an waterfall located in Cloudland Canyon State Park in Dade County, Georgia. The waterfall, formerly unnamed, was named in a contest.

== See also ==
- Cherokee Falls
- Cloudland Canyon State Park
- List of waterfalls
