= High Shoals Creek Falls =

Coordinates: 34°49′22.5″N 83°43′20.2″W

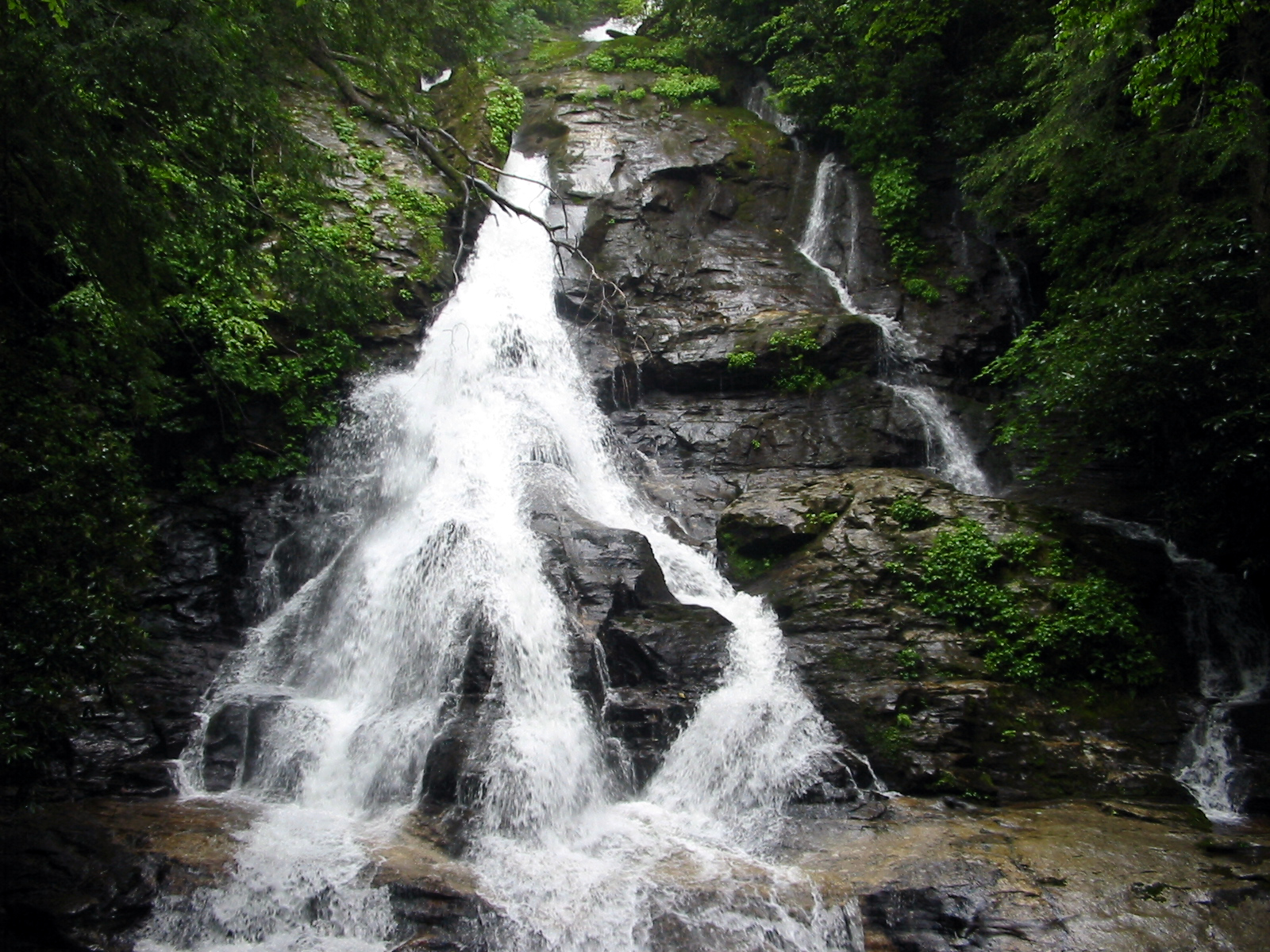
- Interactive map of High Shoals Creek Falls
- Location: Towns County, Georgia
- Type: Cascade
- Watercourse: High Shoals Creek

High Shoals Creek Falls located on High Shoals Creek in the High Shoals Scenic Area of the Chattahoochee–Oconee National Forest in Towns County, Georgia and features two observation decks.

== See also ==
- List of waterfalls
