= Southern Nuclear =

American nuclear energy company

Southern Nuclear Operating Company, Inc.
- Type: Subsidiary
- Industry: Nuclear plant operator
- Founded: 1990; 36 years ago
- Headquarters: Birmingham, Alabama, US
- Key people: Peter Sena (President and CEO); Richard Libra (EVP and Chief nuclear officer); Cheryl Gayheart (Vice President of Regulatory Affairs); Earl Berry (vice president of engineering); Shane Camp (vice president of human resources); Ho Nieh (Vice President, INPO Loaned Executive); Millicent W. Ronnlund (Vice President, General Counsel, Compliance Officer & Secretary); John B. Williams (Senior Vice President of Technical Services and External Affairs); Edwin (Sonny) D. Dean (Site Vice President of Joseph M. Farley Nuclear Plant); Matthew Busch (site vice president of Edwin I. Hatch Nuclear Plant); Johnny Weissinger (site vice president of Alvin W. Vogtle Electric Generating Plant, Units 1 and 2); Patrick Martino (site vice president of Alvin W. Vogtle Electric Generating Plant, units 3 and 4)
- Products: Energy generation
- Number of employees: 3,500
- Parent: Southern Company
- Website: southernnuclear.com

Southern Nuclear previous logo

Southern Nuclear Operating Company, Inc., headquartered in Birmingham, Alabama, is a nuclear energy power company. The company operates a total of eight units for Alabama Power and Georgia Power at the Joseph M. Farley Nuclear Plant near Dothan, Alabama; the Edwin I. Hatch Nuclear Plant near Baxley, Ga., and the Alvin W. Vogtle Electric Generating Plant near Waynesboro, Ga. Southern Nuclear is the licensee of two new nuclear units at Plant Vogtle, which were the first nuclear units constructed in the United States in more than 30 years.

Southern Nuclear's reliability has a current average three-year fleet capacity factor of 93.2 percent, exceeding the U.S. average of 91.2 percent for the years 2013–2015.

== Nuclear Power Generating Facilities ==
=== Plant Farley ===
The Joseph M. Farley Nuclear Plant is located on 1,850 acres along the Chattahoochee River near Dothan in southeast Alabama. Construction of the plant began in 1970. Unit 1 achieved commercial operation in December 1977. Unit 2 began commercial operation in July 1981. The total cost of the plant was about $1.57 billion.

Each unit is capable of generating 900 megawatts of electric power for a total capacity of 1,800 MW. The plant is powered by Westinghouse pressurized water reactors. The containment building, which houses the reactor, the reactor coolant system and other nuclear-related components, is constructed of reinforced concrete and carbon steel.

=== Plant Hatch ===
The Edwin I. Hatch Electric Generating Plant sits on a 2,224-acre site along the Altamaha, Georgia's largest river, near Baxley, Ga. It is jointly owned by Georgia Power (50.1 percent), Oglethorpe Power Corporation (30 percent), Municipal Electric Authority of Georgia (17.7 percent) and Dalton Utilities (2.2 percent).

Construction of the plant began in 1968. Unit 1 began commercial operation in December 1975.

Unit 2 began commercial operation in September 1979. Units 1 and 2 are rated at 924 megawatts of electric power each for a total capacity of 1,848 MW. The plant is powered by boiling water reactors supplied by General Electric Company.

=== Plant Vogtle ===
Unit 1 began commercial operation in May 1987. Unit 2 began commercial operation in May 1989. Each unit is capable of generating 1,215 megawatts of electric power for a total capacity of 2,430 MW. The plant is powered by pressurized water reactors manufactured by Westinghouse. The turbines and electric generators are manufactured by General Electric. Southern Nuclear is overseeing the licensing and construction of two new nuclear units at the Plant Vogtle site near Augusta, Ga. Vogtle 3 and 4 will be among the first new nuclear plants built in America in more than 30 years.

Due to setbacks from the Chapter 11 bankruptcy of reactor supplier Westinghouse, Vogtle units 3 and 4 were delayed by a year and were ultimately were commissioned on July 31, 2023, and April 29, 2024, respectively.
