= Hal B. Wansley Power Plant =

Power station in Georgia, United States

- Country: United States
- Location: Heard County, Georgia
- Coordinates: 33°24′48″N 85°01′57″W
- Status: Operational (Units 1 & 2 retired)
- Commission date: 1976 (Units 1 & 2), 2002 (Units 6 & 7), 2003 (Unit 8), 2004 (Unit 9)
- Decommission date: 2022 (Units 1 & 2)
- Owners: Southern Company, Georgia Power Company, Oglethorpe Power Corporation, Municipal Electric Authority of Georgia, Dalton Utilities
- Operators: Georgia Power Company (coal units), Southern Power (gas units), Oglethorpe Power Corporation (Unit 8), Municipal Electric Authority of Georgia (Unit 9)

Thermal power station
- Primary fuel: Coal, Natural Gas, Oil

Thermal
- Cooling towers: Yes
- Cooling source: Service water pond (Chattahoochee River tributary)
- Combined cycle?: Yes (Gas Units)
- Units 1 & 2 Capacity (retired): 1904 MW (952 MW each)
- Units 6 & 7 Capacity: 826.8 MW (combined)
- Unit 8 Capacity: 549.7 MW
- Unit 9 Capacity: 568 MW
- Total Capacity (excluding retired units): 1944.5 MW

Power generation
- Units operational: Units 5A, 6, 7, 8, 9
- Units decommissioned: 1 & 2
- Nameplate capacity: 3,789.9 MW

Hal B. Wansley Power Plant is a power station located in northeastern Heard County, between Franklin and Carrollton, in the state of Georgia, United States. Its various units, powered by coal, oil, and natural gas, are operated by Southern Company, Georgia Power Company, Oglethorpe Power Corporation, Municipal Electric Authority and Dalton Utilities.

== Location ==
The plant is located in the north-east corner of Heard County, Georgia, about 20 kilometres (12 mi) south of Carrollton, and at about the same distance northeast of Franklin.

== Yellow Dirt Church Cemetery controversy ==
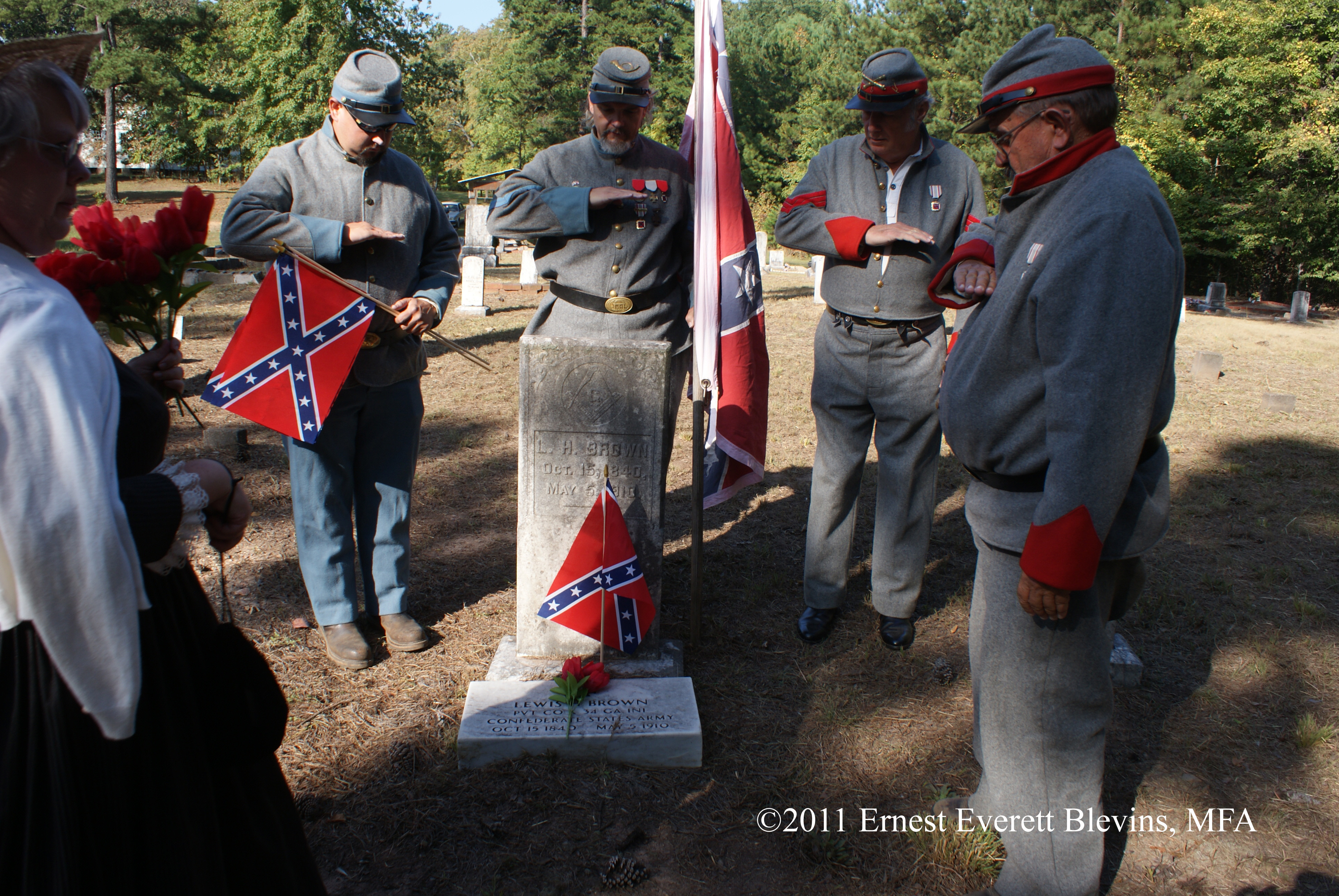
Civil War re-enactors replacing Confederate flags removed by Georgia Power

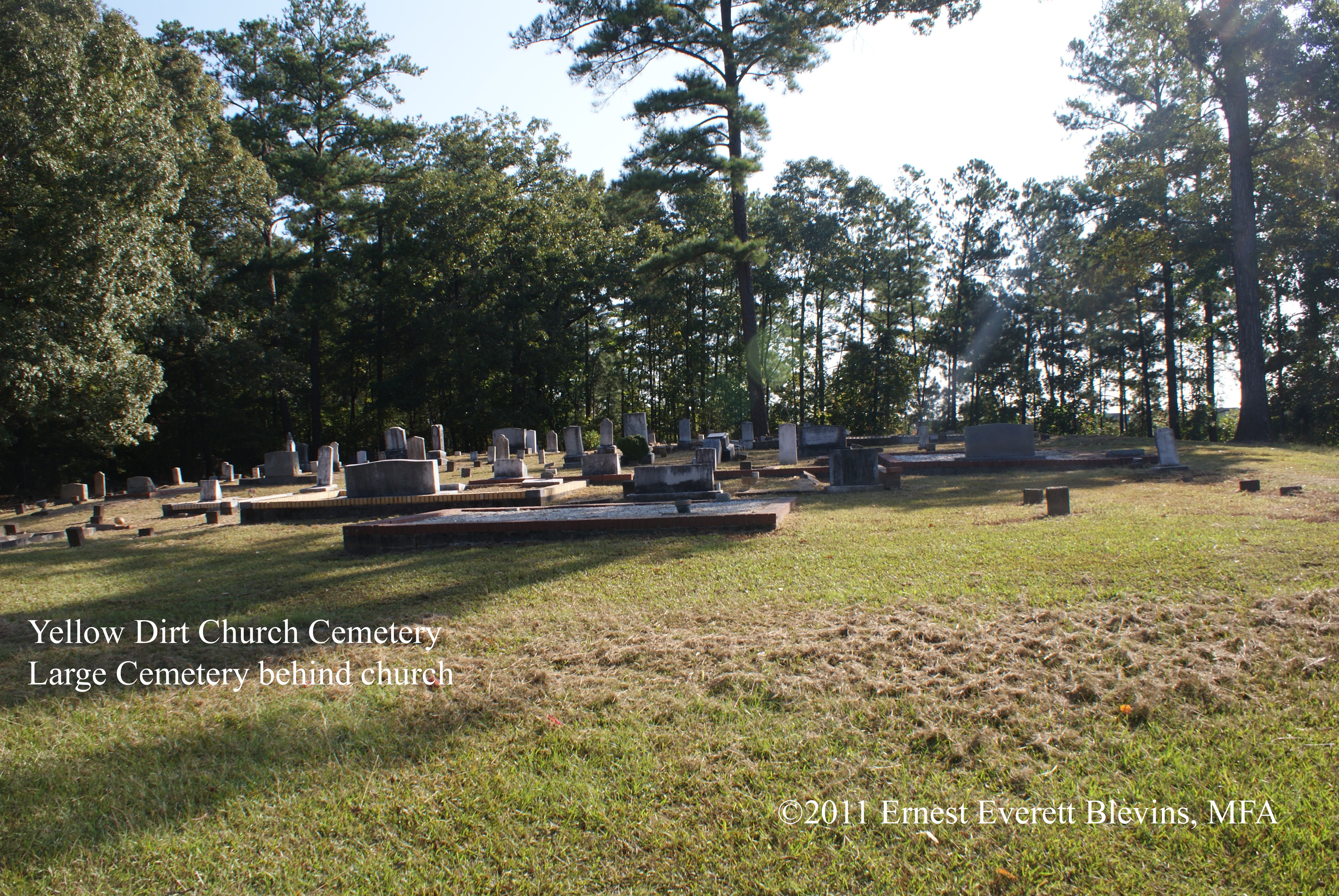
The Yellow Dirt Church Cemetery, which has the graves of seven Confederate soldiers

Historic Yellow Dirt Church Cemetery is located on the grounds of the power plant. Visitors have to stop at the plant's gate and have a security guard escort them to the cemetery.

The cemetery was part of a larger tract of land owned by the Yellow Dirt Baptist Church (founded 1872). When the church building and land was sold to Georgia Power, in 1971, the church (now Lighthouse Baptist Church of Franklin, Georgia) and congregation retained ownership to a two-acre parcel which including the cemetery. Problems eventually arose, however, when Georgia Power employees attempted to assert control over the private two-acre parcel.

In September 2011, a Georgia Power employee entered the cemetery and removed seven Confederate flags placed on the graves of Confederate veterans. The flags were replaced in October 2011 by the local Sons of Confederate Veterans, but were subsequently removed again by employees of the utility based on a company policy prohibiting the display of offensive materials on company property. Members of the church congregation, some of whom had Confederate ancestors buried in the cemetery, protested. Congregation members asserting their property rights to the cemetery, stating that the flags were not placed on company property and that Georgia Power had no right to interfere with the practice. Georgia Power conceded the matter after company attorneys completed a title search in November 2011. Members of the Sons of Confederate Veterans and descendants of Confederate soldiers buried in the cemetery, who had earlier protested the utility's actions, returned to the cemetery to replace the confiscated flags.

== Individual units ==
=== Georgia Power Company owned ===
- Two dual-use Units 1 and 2 (also known as SG01 and SG02) can be fueled either by bituminous coal or by oil. They are rated at 952 MWe each, and were launched into service in 1976 and 1978. These were retired by the end of August 2022.
- Oil-fired Unit 5A is rated 52.8 MWe, it was launched in 1980.

=== Southern Power owned ===
- Natural gas-fired combined-cycle steam plant Units ST6 and ST7 are rated at 213.3 MWe each, and were launched in 2002.
- Natural gas-fired combined-cycle steam turbines of Units CT6A, CT6B, CT7A, and CT7B are rated at 203.1 MWe each and were also launched in June, 2002.

Collectively, units ST6, CT6A, and CT6B are referred to as unit 6. Same is true about its twin unit 7.

=== Oglethorpe Power Corporation owned ===
Unit 8, also known as Chattahoochee Energy Facility, consists of three combined-cycle gas-powered generators: 1 and 2, rated at 176 MWe each, and 3, rated at 187.7 MWe. All of them were launched into service in 2003.

=== Municipal Electric Authority of Georgia owned ===
Wansley Unit 9 consists of three combined-cycle gas-powered generators: CT1 and CT2, rated at 171 MWe each, and ST1, rated at 226 MWe. All of them were launched into service in 2004.

== Coal delivery ==
Coal is delivered via Norfolk Southern Railway Company unit coal trains 100-cars long, each carrying 10,000 tons of coal. At the plant, an automated unloading trestle empties the train in about 30 minutes and conveyor belts move the coal to the storage pile or the storage bunkers inside the plant. The bunkers hold a 14-hour reserve; the coal pile target inventory is a 32-day supply.

Coal is coarsely crushed at the mine then crushed again at the plant as it travels to the storage bunkers inside the boiler house. A pulverizer below each bunker grinds the coal to a fine powder that is mixed with air and blown into the boiler through a network of pipes. With both units at full load, Plant Wansley burns about 14,000 tons of coal every 24 hours. Annual consumption averages four to five million tons.

== Cooling water ==
Cooling water is taken up from the "service water pond", created by damming a small creek flowing from the north-west into the Chattahoochee River immediately on the south-eastern side of the plant.

At coal-fired units 1 and 2, water is converted to steam at 1,000 °F (540 °C) temperature and 3,600 psi (25 MPa) pressure. At full 920 MWe load, each turbine processes 6,200,000 pounds (2,800 metric tons) of steam per hour. Low-pressure steam exits the turbine into a condenser where it is cooled and converted back into the water to repeat the cycle. During this cooling process required by the second law of thermodynamics, waste heat from the condensing steam is absorbed by the warm water that circulates through the cooling towers, where it cools by evaporation and forced convection of air.

== Environment ==
Electrostatic precipitators on units 1 and 2 remove more than 99% of the fly ash from the boiler exhaust stream. A digital boiler control system, low NO_{x} burners, and selective catalytic reactors, installed since the initial operation, have reduced nitrogen oxide (NO_{x}) emissions by almost 90%. The use of cooling towers and the closed-loop steam cycle prevent thermal pollution in the Chattahoochee River.

Wet scrubbers and hydrated lime injection systems remove almost all sulphur oxides from the flue gas as well.
