= List of power stations in Georgia (U.S. state) =

Sources of Georgia utility-scale electricity generation in gigawatt-hours, full-year 2025:
1. Natural gas: 56,911 (38.6%)
2. Nuclear: 51,225 (34.7%)
3. Coal: 20,025 (13.6%)
4. Solar: 11,267 (7.64%)
5. Biomass: 4,707 (3.19%)
6. Hydroelectric: 2,990 (2.03%)
7. Petroleum: 315 (0.21%)

This is a list of electricity-generating power stations in the U.S. state of Georgia, sorted by type and name. In 2024, Georgia had a total summer capacity of 39.7 GW through all of its power plants, and a net generation of 139,805 GWh. In 2025, the electrical energy generation mix was 38.6% natural gas, 34.7% nuclear, 13.6% coal, 7.6% solar, 3.2% biomass, 2% hydroelectric, and 0.2% petroleum. Distributed small-scale solar, including customer-owned photovoltaic panels, delivered an additional net 613 GWh to the state's electricity grid in 2025. This compares to 11,276 GWh generated by Georgia's utility-scale solar facilities.

Two new nuclear reactors have been constructed at the Vogtle Electric Generating Plant. They are the nation's first AP1000 reactors and were connected to the grid in March 2024. The state has no active uranium or fossil-fuel mining operations and limited proven reserves of coal.

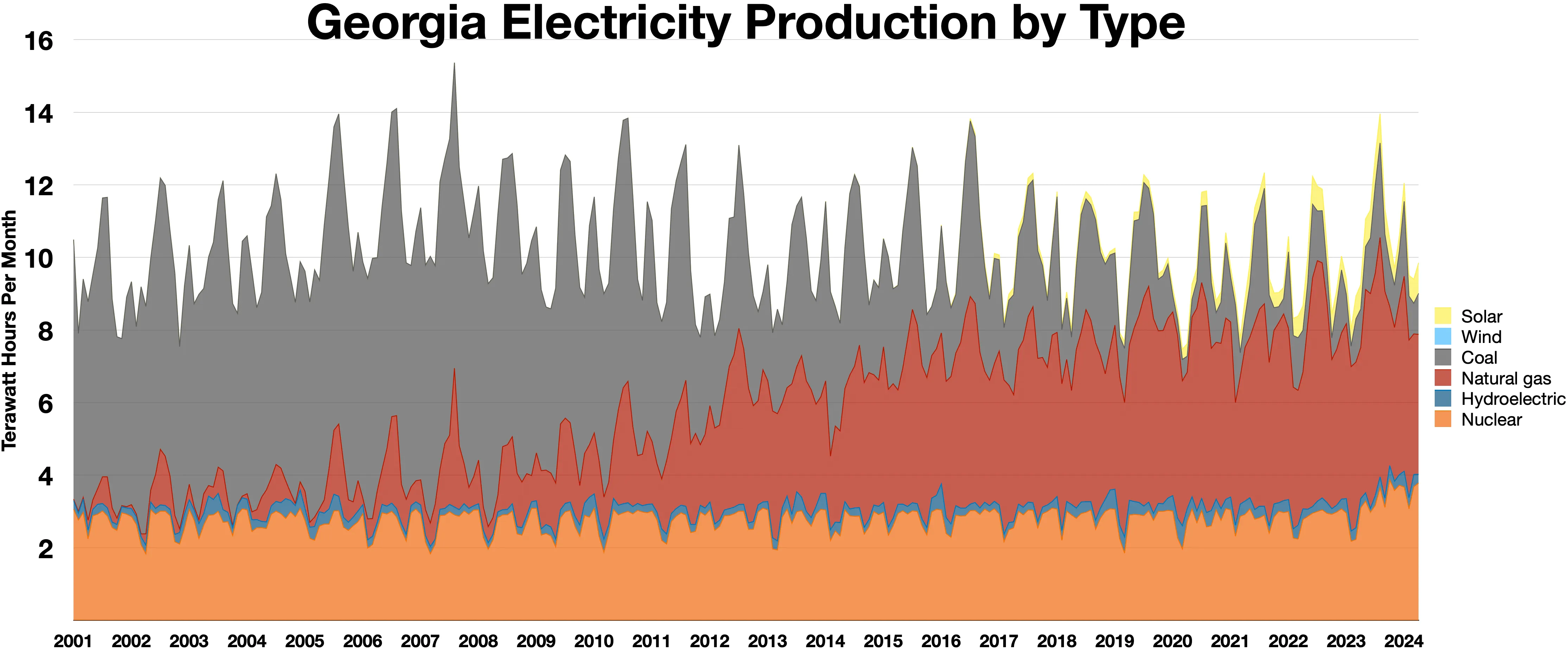
Georgia electricity production by type

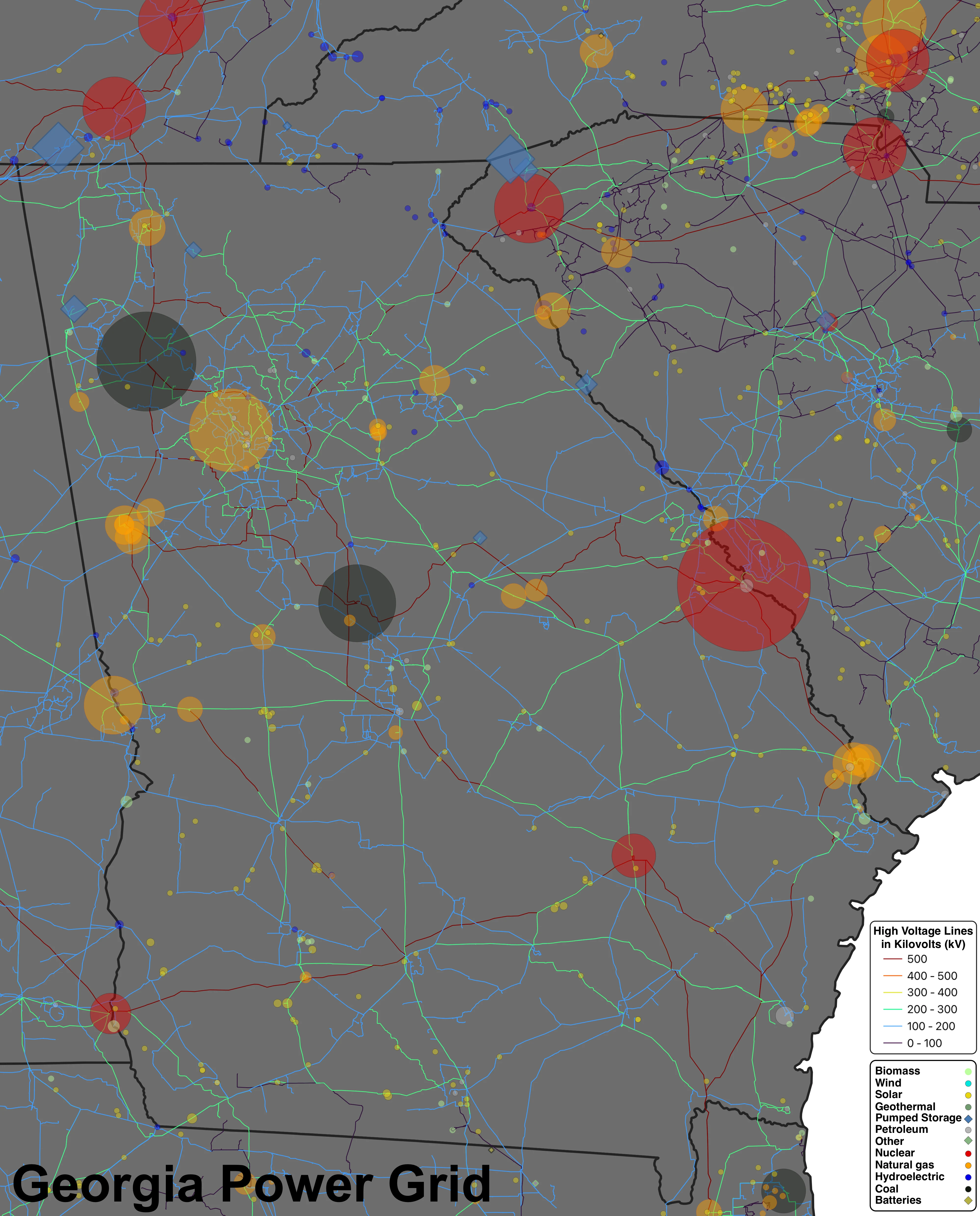
Georgia power grid

== Nuclear power plants ==
Name	Nearest city	Coordinates	Capacity (MW)	Number of units	Year completed	Refs
Alvin W. Vogtle Nuclear Electric Generating Plant (Plant Vogtle)	Waynesboro, Georgia	33°08′34″N 81°45′45″W	4,536 (unit 4 commissioned in April)	4	1987 - Unit 1; 1989 - Unit 2 2023 - Unit 3; 2024 - Unit 4	
Edwin I. Hatch Nuclear Electric Generating Plant (Plant Hatch)	Baxley, Georgia	31°56′03″N 82°20′41″W	1,726	2	1975 - Unit 1; 1979 - Unit 2	

== Fossil-fuel power plants ==
=== Coal ===
Name	Location	Coordinates	Capacity (MW)	Coal type	Year completed	Operational/closure date	Refs
Bowen Steam-Electric Generating Plant (Plant Bowen)	Bartow County	34°07′23″N 84°55′13″W	3,160	Coal (bituminous)	1971 - Unit 1; 1972 - Unit 2; 1974 - Unit 3; 1975 - Unit 4	Operational	
Robert W Scherer Power Plant (Plant Scherer)	Monroe County	33°03′45″N 83°48′14″W	3,520	Coal (sub-bituminous)	1982 - Unit 1; 1984 - Unit 2; 1987 - Unit 3; 1989 - Unit 4	Partially operational - Unit 4 (880 MW) closed in 2021	

^{A} Two dual-use Units 1 and 2 (also known as SG01 and SG02) can be fueled either by bituminous coal or by oil.

=== Natural gas ===
Name	Location	Coordinates	Capacity (MW)	Generation type	Year completed	Operational/ closure date	Refs
AL Sandersville	Washington County	33°07′08″N 82°51′39″W	576.4	Simple cycle (x8)	2002	Operational	
Baconton	Mitchell County	31°23′13″N 84°04′48″W	196	Simple cycle (x4)	2000	Operational	
Bobby C. Smith (Effingham)	Effingham County	32°16′38″N 81°17′04″W	514.0	2x1 combined cycle	2003	Operational	
Chattahoochee	Heard County	33°24′26″N 85°02′19″W	457.9	2x1 Combined cycle	2003	Operational	
Dahlberg	Jackson County	34°02′32″N 83°23′52″W	756.0	Simple cycle (x10)	2000/2001	Operational	
Doyle	Walton County	33°50′16″N 83°41′58″W	320	Simple cycle (x5)	2000	Operational	
Edward L Addison	Upson County	32°54′40″N 84°18′23″W	591.7	Simple cycle (x4)	2000	Operational	
Hal B Wansley (Plant Wansley)	Heard County	33°24′12″N 85°01′56″W	1,184.8	2x1 combined cycle (x2)	2002	Operational	
Hartwell	Hart County	34°20′23″N 82°49′12″W	298.1	Simple cycle (x2)	1994	Operational	
Hawk Road	Heard County	33°21′31″N 84°54′41″W	456.3	Simple cycle (x3)	2001	Operational	
Jack McDonough	Cobb County	33°49′26″N 84°28′33″W	2,546.0	Simple cycle (x2); 2x1 Combined Cycle (x3)	1971 (64 MW); 2011/2012	Operational	
Kraft Steam-Electric Generating Plant (Plant Kraft)	Chatham County	32°8′54.9924″N 81°8′45.0096″W	208	Unknown - Unit 4	1958/1965	Closed - 2015^{[A]}	
McIntosh	Effingham County	32°20′52″N 81°10′54″W	1,974.8	Simple cycle (x8), 2x1 combined cycle (x2)	1994 (658 MW); 2005	Operational	
Mid-Georgia Cogen	Houston County	32°29′08″N 83°36′14″W	303.0	2x1 combined cycle	1997/1998	Operational	
MPC Generating	Walton County	33°48′43″N 83°41′43″W	302.5	Simple cycle (x2)	2000/2001	Operational	
Sewell Creek Energy	Polk County	33°56′55″N 85°16′37″W	451.1	Simple cycle (x4)	2000	Operational	
Smarr	Monroe County	32°59′03″N 83°50′47″W	187.4	Simple cycle (x2)	1999	Operational	
Sowega	Mitchell County	31°23′13″N 84°04′48″W	97	Simple cycle (x2)	1999	Operational	
Talbot County	Talbot County	32°35′21″N 84°41′30″W	579.1	Simple cycle (x6)	2002/2003	Operational	
Tenaska Georgia	Heard County	33°21′06″N 84°59′59″W	945.0	Simple cycle (x6)	2001/2002	Operational	
Thomas A Smith	Murray County	34°42′34″N 84°55′03″W	1,260.0	2x1 combined cycle (x2)	2002	Operational	
Walton County	Walton County	33°48′53″N 83°41′43″W	454.5	Simple cycle (x3)	2001	Operational	
Wansley Unit 9	Heard County	33°24′23″N 85°02′13″W	489.6	2x1 combined cycle	2004	Operational	
Washington County	Washington County	33°05′32″N 82°58′48″W	615.5	Simple cycle (x4)	2003	Operational	
Yates	Coweta County	33°27′44″N 84°53′55″W	714.0	Steam turbine (x2)	1974	Operational	

^{A} Retired alongside coal units 1–3.

=== Oil ===
Name	Location	Coordinates	Capacity (MW)	Year completed	Operational/closure date	Refs
Allen B. Wilson Combustion Turbine Plant	Burke County	33°08′15.8″N 81°44′54.1″W	354		Operational	
Eugene A. Yates Steam-Electric Generating Plant	Coweta County		808	1974 - Unit 6; 1974 - Unit 7	Operational	
Hal B. Wansley Power Plant (Plant Wansley)	Heard County	33°24′48″N 85°01′57″W	52.8	1980 - 5A	Operational	
Plant McManus	Glynn County			1950s - Unit 1; 1950s - Unit 2	Closed - 2015	

== Renewable power plants ==
Data from the U.S. Energy Information Administration.

=== Biomass and municipal waste ===
Name	Location	Coordinates	Capacity (MW)	Fuel	Year completed	Refs
Albany Green Energy	Dougherty County	31°33′21″N 84°06′37″W	49.5	wood/wood waste	2017	
Brunswick Cellulose	Glynn County	31°10′31″N 82°20′41″W	72.2	wood/wood waste	1954/1960/ 1996	
Flint River Operations	Macon County	32°15′16″N 84°04′00″W	77.0	wood/wood waste	1980/2015	
GA LFG - Oak Grove Plant	Barrow County	33°57′54″N 83°45′56″W	6.3	landfill gas	2016	
GA LFG - Pine Ridge Plant	Spalding County	33°14′39″N 84°07′19″W	6.3	landfill gas	2016	
GA LFG - Richland Creek Plant	Gwinnett County	34°07′38″N 84°02′00″W	10.5	landfill gas	2016	
Georgia Pacific - Cedar Springs	Early County	31°09′58″N 85°05′42″W	90.0	wood/wood waste	1963/1965	
Graphics Packaging - Augusta Mill	Richmond County	33°19′43″N 81°57′11″W	42.8	wood/wood waste	1960/1965	
GRP Franklin RE Facility	Franklin County	34°22′34″N 83°19′50″W	58.0	wood/wood waste	2019	
GRP Madison RE Facility	Madison County	34°02′26″N 83°11′34″W	58.0	wood/wood waste	2019	
Inland Paperboard - Rome	Floyd County	34°15′10″N 85°19′39″W	61.0	wood/wood waste	1954/1961/ 1989	
Intl Paper - Savanna Mill	Chatham County	32°06′01″N 81°07′27″W	82.7	wood/wood waste	1989	
Jesup Plant	Wayne County	31°39′33″N 81°50′38″W	64.7	wood/wood waste	1954/1957/ 1971/1982	
MAS ASB Cogen Plant	Fulton County	33°39′18″N 84°23′40″W	6.6	landfill gas	2012	
PCA - Valdosta Mill	Lowndes County	30°41′40″N 83°18′11″W	69.9	wood/wood waste	1954/2011	
Pecan Row LFG	Lowndes County	30°48′54″N 83°21′45″W	6.4	landfill gas	1977/2013	
Piedmont Green Power	Lamar County	33°02′43″N 84°07′32″W	55.0	wood/wood waste	2013	
Port Wentworth Mill	Chatham County	32°09′22″N 81°09′31″W	60.5	wood/wood waste	1991/2004	
Riverwood Intl - Macon Mill	Bibb County	32°46′17″N 83°37′41″W	76.4	wood/wood waste	1948/1981/ 2013	
South Columbus Water Resource	Muscogee County	32°24′43″N 84°58′34″W	3.6	biogas	2010	
Superior LFG	Chatham County	32°01′49″N 81°16′20″W	6.4	landfill gas	2009	
Taylor LFG	Taylor County	32°27′08″N 84°23′14″W	8.0	landfill gas	2003/2011	
WestRock Southeast	Laurens County	32°30′13″N 82°50′39″W	44.0	wood/wood waste	1989	

=== Hydroelectric dams ===
Georgia Power Hydro incorporates 72 hydroelectric generating units to produce a generation capacity of 844,720 kilowatts (kW). Georgia Power Hydro facilities also provide more than 45,985 acres (18,609 ha) of water bodies and more than 1,057 mi (1,701 km) of shoreline for habitat and recreational use.

Name	Nearest city	Capacity (MW)	Year completed	Refs
Barnett Shoals Hydroelectric Generating Plant	Athens, Georgia	2.8	1910	
Bartletts Ferry Hydroelectric Generating Plant	Columbus, Georgia	173.0^{[A]}	1926/1951/ 1985	
Blue Ridge Dam (owned and operated by the Tennessee Valley Authority)	Blue Ridge, Georgia	13	1931/1994	
Buford Dam	Forsyth County, Georgia	126	1956	
Burton Hydroelectric Generating Plant	Clayton, Georgia	6.12	1927	
Carters Dam Hydro	Ellijay, Georgia	286.0^{[B]}	1977	
Estatoah Hydroelectric Generating Plant	Mountain City, Georgia	2.4	1929	
Flint River Hydroelectric Generating Plant	Albany, Georgia	5.4	1921/1925	
Goat Rock Hydroelectric Generating Plant	Columbus, Georgia	38.6	1915/2005	
Langdale Hydroelectric Generating Plant	West Point, Georgia	1.04	1924/1926	
Lloyd Shoals Hydroelectric Generating Plant	Jackson, Georgia	14.4	1911/1917	
Morgan Falls Hydroelectric Generating Plant	Sandy Springs, Georgia	16.8	1903	
Nacoochee Hydroelectric Generating Plant	Clayton, Georgia	4.8	1926	
North Highlands Hydroelectric Generating Plant	Columbus, Georgia	29.6	1963	
Oliver Dam Hydroelectric Generating Plant	Columbus, Georgia	60.0	1959	
Richard B. Russell	Calhoun Falls, South Carolina	336.0^{[B]}	1985	
Riverview Hydroelectric Generating Plant	West Point, Georgia	0.48	1920's	
Sinclair Dam Hydroelectric Generating Plant	Milledgeville, Georgia	45.0	1953	
Tallulah Falls Hydroelectric Generating Plant	Tallulah Falls, Georgia	72.0	1913/1920	
Terrora Hydroelectric Generating Plant	Tallulah Falls, Georgia	16.0	1925	
Tugalo Hydroelectric Generating Plant	Lakemont, Georgia	45.0	1923	
Wallace Dam Hydroelectric Generating Plant	Eatonton, Georgia	113.6^{[B]}	1980	
Yonah Hydroelectric Generating Plant	Lakemont, Georgia	22.5	1925	

^{A} Electricity is generated in Alabama.
^{B} Carters, Russell, and Wallace generate additional electricity as reversible pumped storage.

=== Solar photovoltaic ===
Name	Location	Area	Capacity (MW)	Refs
Butler Solar Facility	Taylor County	1,070 acres (430 ha)	103	
Decatur County Solar Facility	Decatur County	169 acres (68 ha)	19	
Facebook Facility (Newton Data Center)	Early County	1,200 acres (490 ha)	102.5	
Fort Benning Solar Facility	Muscogee County	240 acres (97 ha)	30	
Fort Gordon Solar Facility	Columbia County	270 acres (110 ha)	30	
Fort Stewart Solar Facility	Liberty County	250 acres (100 ha)	30	
Kings Bay Naval Submarine Base Solar Facility	Camden County	254 acres (103 ha)	42	
Marine Corps Logistics Base Albany Solar Facility	Dougherty County	150 acres (61 ha)	31	

=== Wind ===
Georgia had no utility-scale wind generating facilities in 2019. It has much potential for offshore development and limited onshore potential.

== Storage power plants ==
Data from the U.S. Energy Information Administration.

=== Batteries ===
Name	Nearest city	Coordinates	Capacity (MW)	Year completed	Refs
Cedartown BES Project	Cedartown, Georgia	34°02′28″N 85°13′24″W	1.0	2015	

=== Pumped storage ===
Name	Nearest city	Coordinates	Capacity (MW)	Year completed	Refs
Carters Dam PS	Ellijay, Georgia	34°36′44″N 84°40′24″W	286.0	1977	
Richard B. Russell	Calhoun Falls, South Carolina	34°01′32″N 82°35′43″W	328.0	2002	
Rocky Mountain Hydroelectric Generating Plant	Rome, Georgia	34°21′20″N 85°18′14″W	1,095	1995	
Wallace Dam Hydroelectric Generating Plant	Eatonton, Georgia	33°20′59″N 83°09′27″W	211.4	1980	

== See also ==
- List of power stations in the United States
- List of power stations operated by the Tennessee Valley Authority
