= Plant Scherer =

Coal-fired power station in Georgia, US

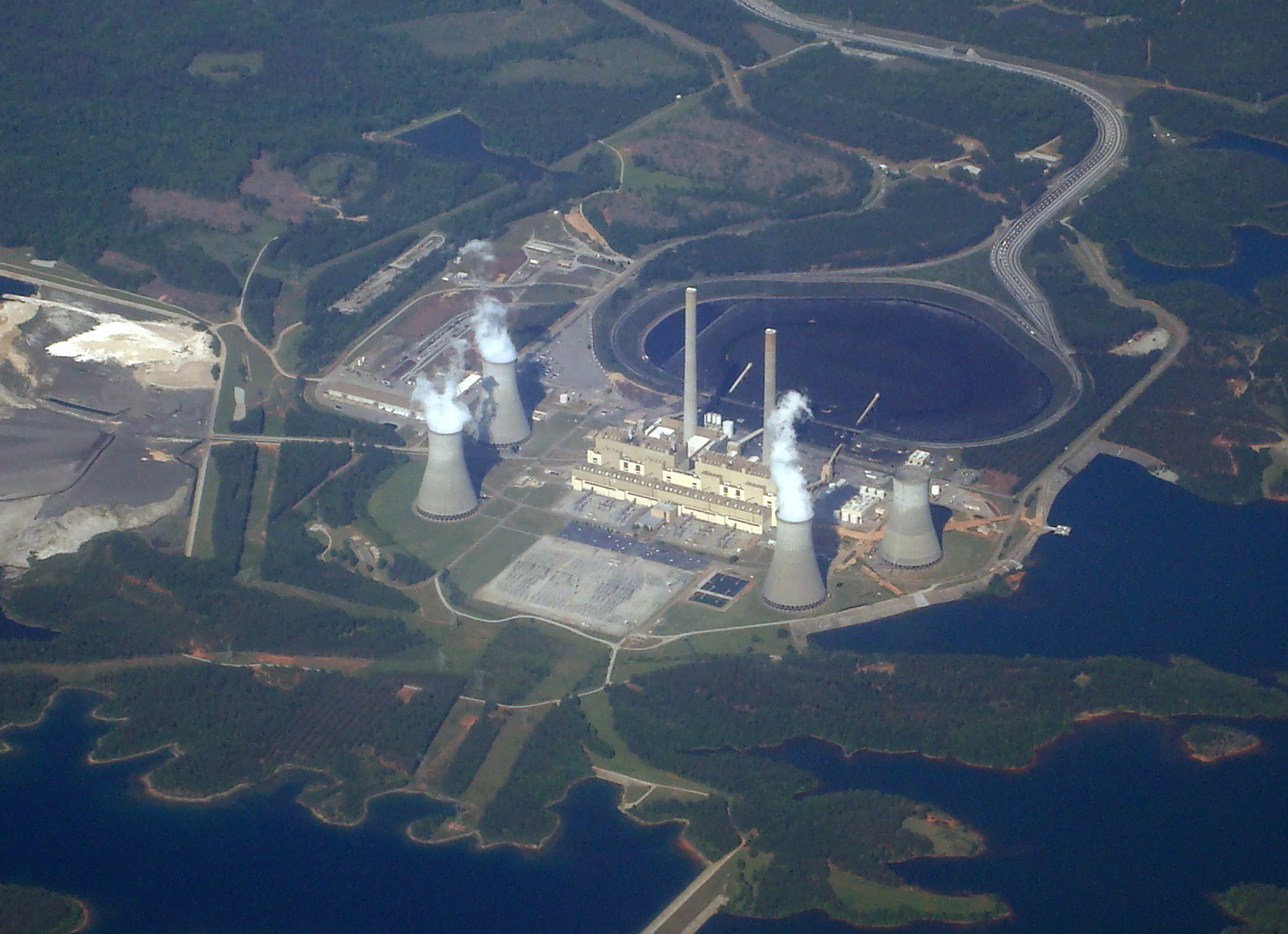
- Official name: Robert W. Scherer Electric Generating Plant
- Country: United States
- Location: Monroe County, near Juliette, Georgia
- Coordinates: 33.063°N 83.804°W
- Commission date: Unit 1: 1982; Unit 2: 1984; Unit 3: 1987; Unit 4: 1989
- Decommission date: Unit 3: 2035 (planned); Unit 4: 2022
- Owners: Oglethorpe Power (30%); FPL (25.35%); Georgia Power (22.95%); MEAG (15.1%); JEA (5.9%); City of Dalton (0.7%)
- Operator: Georgia Power

Thermal power station
- Primary fuel: Coal

Power generation
- Units operational: 4 × 935 MW
- Nameplate capacity: 3,740 MW
- Capacity factor: 61.2%

The Robert W. Scherer Power Plant (also known as Plant Scherer) is a coal-fired power plant in Juliette, Georgia, just north of Macon, Georgia, in the United States. The plant has four generating units, each capable of producing 935 megawatts, and is the most powerful coal-fired plant in North America. The plant is named after the former chairman and chief executive officer of Georgia Power.

== Description ==
Each generating unit has a rated capacity of 945 megawatts, but produces 880 MW. The first unit was brought online in 1982. Additional units were brought online in 1984, 1987, and 1989.

It has two 1,001-foot (305 m) chimney stacks, one built in 1982 and the second in 1986. Based on data as of 2018, Plant Scherer is the fourth-largest electric generating plant in the United States, the largest to be fueled exclusively by coal, and the number one emitter of greenhouse gas (GHG) emissions in the U.S., at over 20,000,000 short tons (18,000,000 t) per year.

The plant's location is along the flight path of many commercial airline flights using Hartsfield-Jackson Airport in Atlanta, and is a prominent feature on the landscape, easily visible during daylight flights.

It was announced in June 2020 that Scherer would shut down Unit 4 by 2022 under an agreement reached by Florida Power & Light and the Jacksonville Electric Authority (JEA). In November 2021, Georgia Power announced that Unit 3 would also close, this time by year 2025; however, the company reversed that decision in 2022, extending the shut down date for unit 3 until at least 2028, and announced plans in January 2025 to extend the lifetime of the unit until 2038.

== Operator and ownership ==
The plant is operated by Georgia Power, a subsidiary of the Southern Company, along with Oglethorpe Power Corporation, the city of Dalton, Georgia; NextEra Energy (through subsidiary Florida Power & Light); JEA of Jacksonville, Florida; and the Municipal Electric Authority of Georgia.

	Unit 1	Unit 2	Unit 3	Unit 4
OPC	60.0%	60.0%	—	—
Georgia Power	8.4%	8.4%	75.0%	—
FPL	—	—	25.0% (Note: FPL's share of Unit 3 was previously owned by Gulf Power Company, when that utility was owned by Southern Company, the owners of Georgia Power. NextEra Energy, the parent company of FPL, acquired Gulf Power in 2019, assimilating it into the FPL system in 2021 and retiring its name in 2022. Prior to the merger, FPL's total ownership of Plant Scherer was 15.1% and Gulf Power's was 6.25%.)	76.4%
MEAG	30.2%	30.2%	—	—
JEA	—	—	—	23.6%
City of Dalton	1.4%	1.4%	—	—

== Coal trains ==
The coal used at the Scherer plant comes from Wyoming's Powder River Basin, and is delivered by Norfolk Southern to the plant by BNSF unit trains of up to 135 cars. Currently, Plant Scherer averages about 6 trains per week. The trains use a hydraulic dump system and are unloaded from the bottom of the cars while passing over the unloading trestle. They do not stop while unloading, and are usually unloaded in around 90 minutes. Train ID numbers are usually NS 732-739. Trains get on Memphis District via BNSF and on Atlanta District in Chattanooga.

== Emissions ==
As of August 2012, Plant Scherer is under Georgia EPD investigation for coal ash pond leeching / drinking water contamination and air pollution / air quality. According to Natural History magazine, as of 2006 Plant Scherer is the largest single point-source for carbon dioxide emissions in the United States. It was also ranked 20th in the world in terms of carbon dioxide emissions by the Center for Global Development on its list of global power plants in November 2007. It was the only power plant in the United States that was listed in the world's top 25 carbon dioxide producers.

=== Regulatory policies and institutions ===
Since 2009 Lisa Jackson, Director of the Environmental Protection Agency (EPA) proposed controversial rules and regulations which include the Utility Maximum Achievable Control Technology rule and the Cross-State Air Pollution Rule. Under CSAPR, non-complying plants like Scherer had only less than six months to implement required changes.

In 2011 Southern Company awarded KBR the contract for the installation of Plant Scherer's environmental compliance equipment, which included installation of flue-gas desulfurization and selective catalytic reduction equipment, related ductwork, and auxiliaries at two coal-fired units.

As of 2010, KBR, Haliburton and other contractors had constructed two additional 847-foot (258 m) tall steam stacks for the Flue-Gas Desulfurization/scrubber.

== See also ==
- List of largest power stations in the United States
- List of power stations in Georgia (U.S. state)
