= List of power stations in Georgia =

List of power stations in Georgia may refer to:

- List of power stations in Georgia (country)
- List of power stations in Georgia (U.S. state)
