= Joseph M. Farley Nuclear Plant =

Nuclear power plant in the southern United States

Joseph M. Farley Nuclear Generating Station
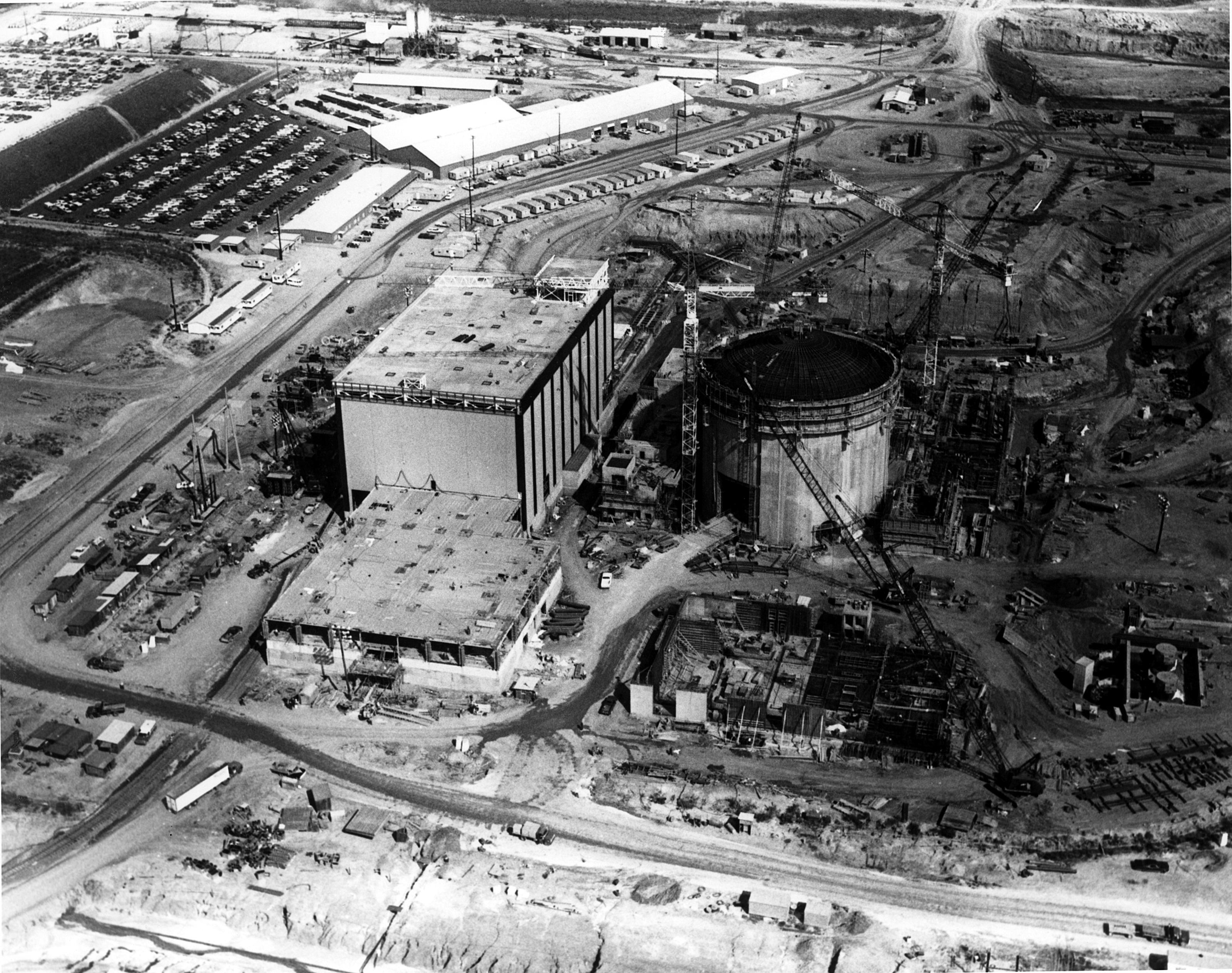
- Construction activities at the Joseph M. Farley Power Plant.
- Official name: Joseph M. Farley Nuclear Plant
- Country: United States
- Location: Columbia, Alabama
- Coordinates: 31°13′23″N 85°6′42″W
- Status: Operational
- Construction began: October 1, 1970
- Commission date: Unit 1: December 1, 1977; Unit 2: July 30, 1981
- Construction cost: $4.115 billion (2007 USD)
- Owner: Alabama Power
- Operator: Southern Nuclear

Nuclear power station
- Reactor type: PWR
- Reactor supplier: Westinghouse
- Cooling towers: 6 × Mechanical Draft
- Cooling source: Chattahoochee River
- Thermal capacity: 2 × 2775 MW_{th}

Power generation
- Units operational: 1 × 874 MW; 1 × 883 MW
- Make and model: WH 3-loop (DRYAMB)
- Nameplate capacity: 1757 MW
- Capacity factor: 96.18% (2017); 85.50% (lifetime)
- Annual net output: 14,982 GWh (2021)

External links
- Website: Plant Farley

The Joseph M. Farley Nuclear Generating Plant is a twin-unit nuclear power station located in Columbia, Alabama, in the southern United States. It sits on a largely wooded and agricultural 1,850-acre (750 ha) site along the Chattahoochee River, approximately 20 miles (32 km) east of Dothan, Alabama, in Houston County.

== History ==
The plant is named after the late Joseph McConnell Farley, an American attorney born in Birmingham, Alabama, who became president of Alabama Power (owner of the facility) from 1969 to 1989 and was later CEO of Southern Nuclear Operating Company; both companies are subsidiaries of Southern Company.

Construction of the plant began in 1970. Fluor Corporation of Irving, Texas was the general contractor. Unit 1 achieved commercial operation in December 1977. Unit 2 began commercial operation in July 1981. The total cost of the plant was about $1.57 billion. On May 12, 2005, the Nuclear Regulatory Commission (NRC) approved license renewal applications for both reactors at the site. Unit 1's extended operating license is set to expire on June 25, 2037 and Unit 2's on March 31, 2041.

== Technology ==
This plant has two Westinghouse reactors.

- Unit 1: 2,821 MWt
- Unit 2: 2,821 MWt

Both units are three-loop pressurized water reactors. The facility is cooled using six mechanical draft cooling towers supplied by water from the Chattahoochee River.

== Electricity production ==
Generation (MWh) of Joseph M. Farley Nuclear Plant
Year	Jan	Feb	Mar	Apr	May	Jun	Jul	Aug	Sep	Oct	Nov	Dec	Annual (Total)
2001	1,272,449	1,024,560	631,182	601,606	1,015,546	1,120,971	1,242,453	1,243,931	1,210,190	721,817	850,739	1,224,872	12,160,316
2002	1,264,235	1,152,381	1,266,258	1,212,829	1,203,778	1,199,073	1,234,644	1,229,609	845,801	604,939	1,231,118	1,240,922	13,685,587
2003	1,278,594	1,150,277	1,196,601	607,222	1,139,920	1,207,113	1,205,537	1,241,148	1,212,396	1,268,783	1,190,810	1,283,597	13,981,998
2004	1,281,366	1,197,109	808,327	862,698	1,270,211	1,233,926	1,260,644	1,261,983	1,197,407	641,474	845,434	1,287,406	13,147,985
2005	1,286,064	1,163,063	1,286,011	1,225,931	1,239,120	1,170,429	1,270,228	1,270,240	1,194,870	846,957	604,440	1,180,984	13,738,337
2006	1,285,930	1,166,273	1,261,211	747,544	744,269	1,226,035	1,227,993	1,270,840	1,238,166	1,287,521	1,249,468	1,334,372	14,039,622
2007	1,294,107	1,169,312	1,286,823	754,231	792,223	1,243,338	1,280,338	1,263,477	1,195,090	577,333	948,954	1,292,641	13,097,867
2008	1,290,834	1,209,205	1,290,834	1,221,983	1,283,906	1,238,178	1,084,548	1,230,776	1,237,470	985,916	703,399	1,296,176	14,073,225
2009	1,297,319	1,172,334	1,081,158	608,402	1,097,428	1,210,526	1,274,036	1,273,252	1,230,588	1,279,768	1,159,324	1,289,442	13,973,577
2010	1,288,051	1,159,228	1,272,447	673,223	857,479	1,231,417	1,253,408	1,264,536	1,217,369	800,068	833,964	1,318,494	13,169,684
2011	1,321,174	1,052,842	1,309,802	1,225,578	1,293,714	1,229,322	1,286,431	1,283,854	1,252,882	814,757	1,026,238	1,334,656	14,431,250
2012	1,213,424	1,246,133	1,269,067	696,509	1,318,959	1,272,736	1,226,176	1,307,855	1,272,839	1,319,812	1,285,228	1,334,239	14,762,977
2013	1,332,572	1,202,452	1,280,685	834,968	1,096,538	1,209,205	1,300,381	1,296,728	1,190,963	737,553	1,285,092	1,330,885	14,098,022
2014	1,248,497	1,203,184	1,325,343	1,284,984	1,274,501	1,265,157	1,307,929	1,308,761	1,266,006	906,219	861,176	1,253,632	14,505,389
2015	1,337,312	1,208,275	1,212,658	637,046	958,216	1,266,847	1,301,327	1,306,715	1,272,271	1,324,674	1,124,550	1,331,797	14,281,688
2016	1,341,773	1,252,945	1,328,747	818,623	1,023,936	1,215,425	1,307,658	1,304,362	1,268,047	657,319	841,701	1,326,720	13,687,256
2017	1,318,200	1,198,063	1,322,958	1,279,626	1,314,487	1,266,180	1,303,580	1,302,841	1,270,068	955,678	941,953	1,330,460	14,804,094
2018	1,332,915	1,182,137	1,190,346	674,758	973,681	1,251,061	1,305,794	1,305,374	1,113,057	1,117,192	1,286,739	1,331,992	14,065,046
2019	1,334,603	1,036,534	1,328,289	758,420	1,218,560	1,267,483	1,307,288	1,309,208	1,176,881	766,288	1,296,974	1,336,434	14,136,962
2020	1,336,316	1,248,847	1,326,947	1,262,135	1,323,766	1,270,401	1,307,212	1,306,926	1,268,701	865,323	928,943	1,330,280	14,775,797
2021	1,339,121	1,209,947	1,081,831	764,430	1,340,735	1,273,195	1,331,085	1,331,700	1,293,514	1,341,243	1,318,239	1,357,897	14,982,937
2022	1,366,204	1,229,072	1,357,085	830,566	1,231,717	1,288,965	1,337,525	1,252,017	964,002	670,261	646,571	814,211	12,988,196
2023	1,363,930	1,143,258	1,358,025	1,310,255	1,351,055	1,144,366	1,332,577	1,331,142	1,296,249	819,392	940,608	1,367,672	14,758,529
2024	1,367,565	1,210,979	1,360,112	780,861	1,077,914	1,294,159	1,335,616	1,326,392	1,299,818	1,355,469	1,311,285	1,363,805	15,083,975
2025	1,365,291	1,228,341	1,006,328	649,412	659,935	879,623	1,330,595	1,338,766	1,193,236	683,864	1,310,303	1,361,898	13,007,592
2026	1,361,972	1,229,043	1,354,464	1,310,102	1,344,775	1,294,102	1,330,486	1,331,854					--

== Ownership ==
- Farley, Unit 1
  - Owner = Alabama Power Company (100 percent).
  - Operator (Licensee) = Southern Nuclear Operation Company.
- Farley, Unit 2
  - Owner = Alabama Power Company (100 percent).
  - Operator (Licensee) = Southern Nuclear Operation Company.

== Surrounding population ==
The NRC defines two emergency planning zones around nuclear power plants: a plume exposure pathway zone with a radius of 10 miles (16 km), concerned primarily with exposure to, and inhalation of, airborne radioactive contamination, and an ingestion pathway zone of about 50 miles (80 km), concerned primarily with ingestion of food and liquid contaminated by radioactivity.

The 2010 U.S. population within 10 miles (16 km) of Farley was 11,842, an increase of 8.0 percent in a decade, according to an analysis of U.S. Census data for msnbc.com. The 2010 U.S. population within 50 miles (80 km) was 421,374, an increase of 6.1 percent since 2000. Cities within 50 miles include Dothan (17 miles to city center).

== Seismic risk ==
The NRC's estimate of the risk each year of an earthquake intense enough to cause core damage to the reactor at Farley was 1 in 35,714, according to an NRC study published in August 2010.
