= Municipal Electric Authority of Georgia =

Electric utility consortium in the U.S.

The Municipal Electric Authority of Georgia (MEAG Power) is an organization that provides electricity generation and power transmission to municipal electric utilities in the U.S. State of Georgia. MEAG is a nonprofit entity established in 1975, and 49 member communities distribute power produced by MEAG or procured on wholesale markets.

It owns 17.7% of Edwin I. Hatch Nuclear Power Plant and 22.7% of Vogtle Electric Generating Plant; 15.1% of the coal-fired Plant Scherer; and one combined-cycle gas-fired unit of Hal B. Wansley Power Plant. It also provides transmission of hydropower from dams operated by the Southeastern Power Administration.

The Integrated Transmission System includes 17,800 miles of transmission lines across Georgia, and is jointly owned by MEAG, Georgia Transmission Corporation, Dalton Utilities and Georgia Power. In 2022, MEAG joined the Southeast Energy Exchange Market, which facilitates energy trading across the region.

It delivers approximately 11 million megawatt-hours to its participating utilities annually.
