= Alvin Vogtle =

American lawyer, executive, WWII pilot and POW (1918–1994)

Alvin Ward Vogtle (October 21, 1918 – April 10, 1994) was an American lawyer, business executive and World War II fighter pilot born in Birmingham, Alabama. He was nicknamed "Sammy from Alabamy" in reference to his home state.

In May 1939, he was awarded a bachelor's degree in science and literature from Auburn University, where he was a member of Sigma Nu fraternity, and studied law at the University of Alabama and the University of Virginia.

Immediately after graduating from the University of Alabama Law School, he enlisted in the United States Army. An Army Spitfire fighter pilot in North Africa during World War II, Vogtle flew approximately 35 combat missions until on a mission in January 1943, his aircraft ran out of fuel while taking enemy fire over Algeria. He was captured, then moved to prison camps in Germany. He spent two years at camps such as Stalag Luft III, Dulag Luft, Offlag XXI-B, Sagan, Nuremberg and Moosburg. He made four unsuccessful escape attempts and on the fifth try made it out to Switzerland in March 1945. Vogtle has been suggested as one of those who inspired the POW character portrayed by Steve McQueen in the movie The Great Escape.

His participation in coordinated escape efforts at Stalag Luft III inspired fellow POW Paul Brickhill's 1950 novel, "The Great Escape", which was adapted into that 1963 feature film.

After the war, he was employed at Alabama Power as a legal counsel and rose through the ranks to become President and Chairman of the Board of Southern Company, one of the largest electric utility holding companies in the nation. Southern Company named a nuclear power plant in eastern Georgia the "Alvin W. Vogtle Electric Generating Plant" in his honor.

Vogtle retired to Florida in 1983. He died April 10, 1994, of heart failure. He was survived by his wife Rachel Giles Vogtle and their seven children.
