= Vogtle Electric Generating Plant =

Nuclear power plant in Burke County, Georgia, US

Plant Vogtle
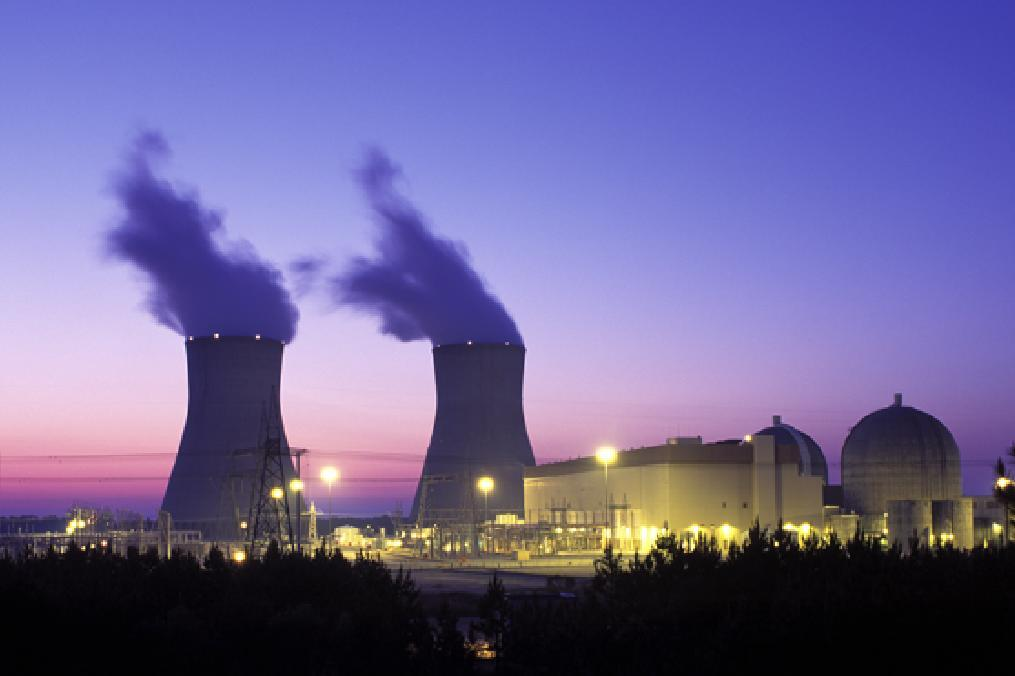
- Vogtle 1 & 2 containment buildings and cooling towers
- Official name: Alvin W. Vogtle Electric Generating Plant
- Country: United States
- Location: Burke County, Georgia
- Coordinates: 33°8′36″N 81°45′38″W
- Status: Operational
- Construction began: Units 1–2: August 1, 1976; Unit 3: March 12, 2013; Unit 4: November 19, 2013
- Commission date: Unit 1: June 1, 1987; Unit 2: May 20, 1989; Unit 3: July 31, 2023; Unit 4: April 29, 2024
- Construction cost: Units 1–2: $8.87 billion (1989 USD) ($20 billion in 2025 dollars); Units 3–4: $36.8 billion
- Owners: Georgia Power (45.7%); OPC (30%); MEAG (22.7%); Dalton Utilities (1.6%)
- Operator: Southern Nuclear

Nuclear power station
- Reactor type: PWR
- Reactor supplier: Westinghouse
- Cooling towers: 4 × Natural Draft
- Cooling source: Savannah River
- Thermal capacity: Units 1–2: 2 × 3626 MW_{th} Units 3–4: 2 × 3400 MW_{th}

Power generation
- Units operational: 1 × 1150 MW_{e} 1 × 1152 MW_{e} 2 × 1117 MW_{e}
- Make and model: Unit 1–2: 2 × WH 4-loop (DRYAMB); Units 3–4: 2 × WH AP1000
- Units cancelled: 2 × 1113 MW
- Nameplate capacity: 4536 MW_{e}
- Capacity factor: 95.09% (2017); 91.25% (lifetime)
- Annual net output: 33,871 GWh (2024)

External links
- Website: Plant Vogtle
- Commons: Related media on Commons

The Alvin W. Vogtle Electric Generating Plant, also known as Plant Vogtle (/ˈvoʊɡəl/ VOH-gəl), is a four-unit nuclear power plant located in Burke County, near Waynesboro, Georgia, in the southeastern United States. With a power capacity of 4,536 megawatts, it is the largest nuclear power plant in the United States (as of 2025), after Units 3 & 4 began operating. It is also the only nuclear plant in the country with four reactors. It is named after a former Alabama Power and Southern Company board chairman, Alvin Vogtle.

The first two units are Westinghouse pressurized water reactors (PWR), with a General Electric steam turbine and electric generator. Units 1 and 2 were completed in 1987 and 1989, respectively, and have a gross electricity generation capacity of 1,215 MW, for a combined capacity of 2,430 MW. The twin natural-draft cooling towers are 548 ft (167 m) tall and provide cooling to the plant's main condensers. Four smaller mechanical draft cooling towers provide nuclear service cooling water (NSCW) to safety and auxiliary non-safety components, as well as remove the decay heat from the reactor when the plant is offline. One natural-draft tower and two NSCW towers serve each unit. In 2009, the Nuclear Regulatory Commission (NRC) renewed the licenses for both units for an additional 20 years to January 16, 2047 for Unit 1, and September 2, 2049 for Unit 2. During the construction of Vogtle's first two units, capital investment required jumped from an estimated $660 million to $8.87 billion. ($20 billion in 2025 dollars)

Two additional units utilizing Westinghouse AP1000 reactors began preliminary construction in 2009, with Unit 3 being completed in July 2023. Natural-draft type cooling towers were also selected, and the two new cooling towers are nearly 600 ft (180 m) tall. During construction, the units suffered several delays and cost overruns. The certified construction and capital costs for these two new units were originally $14 billion, according to the Seventeenth Semi-annual Vogtle Construction Monitoring Report in 2017. This last report blames the latest increase in costs on the contractor not completing work as scheduled. Another complicating factor in the construction process is the bankruptcy of Westinghouse in 2017. In 2018, costs were estimated to be about $25 billion. By 2021, they were estimated to be over $28.5 billion. In 2023, costs had increased to $34 billion, with work still to be completed on Vogtle 4.

Unit 3 began commercial operations on July 31, 2023, becoming the first new nuclear reactor in the United States in 7 years. Unit 4 entered commercial operation on April 29, 2024.

As of the reported FY 2024 3rd quarter financial statements, for units 3-4, the net capital costs incurred by Georgia Power was $10.65 billion in total, with an additional estimated $83 million in completion costs related to site demobilization. This is inclusive of $1.2 billion not shared with other Vogtle owners, net of ~$1.9 billion received from Toshiba in settlement and related customer refunds. With Georgia Power's 45.7% ownership interest implying a total capitalized construction cost of $23.76 billion for Unit 3-4. This is not inclusive of the non-capitalized financing charges incurred (interest) totaling $3.53 billion by Georgia Power, as this was recovered via ratepayer surcharges before completion.

== Units 1 and 2 ==
Vogtle units 1 and 2 are a set of identical Westinghouse 4-Loop reactors. Like many North American nuclear power stations, each of the Vogtle units are constructed of a steel-lined, prestressed, post-tensioned concrete cylinder with a hemispherical dome. The containment was designed by the Los Angeles Regional Office of the Bechtel Corporation.

=== Power Uprate ===
In 2008, reactors 1 and 2 were increased in power by 1.7% by an "Appendix K" uprate, also called a Measurement Uncertainty Recapture (MUR) uprate. Measurement uncertainty recapture power uprates are less than 2 percent, and are achieved by implementing enhanced techniques for calculating reactor power. This involves the use of state-of-the-art feedwater flow measurement devices to more precisely measure feedwater flow, which is used to calculate reactor power.

More precise measurements reduce the degree of uncertainty in the power level, which is used by analysts to predict the ability of the reactor to be safely shut down under postulated accident conditions. Because the reactor power can be calculated with much greater accuracy than with the older venturi type measurement, the plant can safely run within a tighter margin of error to its limits. The newer ultrasonic flowmeter works by comparing the time it takes ultrasonic sound pulses to travel upstream versus downstream inside the pipe, and uses the time differential to figure the flow rate of the water in the pipe.

The NRC approved Vogtle's License Amendment Request (LAR) in March 2008. The NRC staff determined that Southern Nuclear could safely increase the reactor's power output primarily through more accurate means of measuring feedwater flow. NRC staff also reviewed Southern Nuclear's evaluations showing that the plant's design can handle the increased power level. Unit 1 was uprated during its Spring 2008 refueling outage, and Unit 2 was uprated in the Fall outage of the same year.

=== Electricity production ===
Generation (MWh) of Vogtle Electric Generating Plant
Year	Jan	Feb	Mar	Apr	May	Jun	Jul	Aug	Sep	Oct	Nov	Dec	Annual (Total)
2001	1,771,298	1,595,018	1,741,308	1,016,060	1,589,508	1,677,918	1,728,650	1,590,577	1,668,988	1,756,972	1,700,826	1,763,938	19,601,061
2002	1,766,985	1,595,144	1,003,394	1,063,031	1,748,812	1,680,300	1,727,932	1,723,792	1,668,444	993,370	851,998	1,234,136	17,057,338
2003	1,756,418	1,597,739	1,594,304	1,699,505	1,659,413	1,679,656	1,727,929	1,431,140	1,477,732	1,078,977	1,673,705	1,770,700	19,147,218
2004	1,758,609	1,605,957	1,628,483	1,314,845	1,224,113	1,669,584	1,717,020	1,646,446	1,674,477	1,744,280	1,588,754	1,758,389	19,330,957
2005	1,688,533	1,588,104	1,195,063	1,369,839	1,481,221	1,380,875	1,713,562	1,715,446	1,298,644	1,225,946	1,692,494	1,463,302	17,813,029
2006	1,753,949	1,186,635	1,422,733	1,403,832	1,733,444	1,654,782	1,715,255	1,574,770	1,226,224	867,031	1,672,989	1,735,509	17,947,153
2007	1,736,443	1,557,456	923,930	813,673	1,577,666	1,636,196	1,685,127	1,674,106	1,606,215	1,703,033	1,665,714	1,717,334	18,296,893
2008	1,722,551	1,607,474	1,242,777	950,508	1,725,749	1,652,026	1,704,667	1,704,456	1,159,653	1,040,027	1,501,696	1,765,969	17,777,553
2009	1,772,030	1,599,207	1,739,139	1,701,696	1,743,997	1,672,730	1,730,046	1,727,776	1,325,345	1,067,476	1,681,867	1,524,615	19,285,924
2010	1,771,935	1,601,769	1,044,133	1,466,689	1,740,841	1,668,687	1,721,356	1,719,760	1,678,059	1,736,954	1,697,292	1,763,002	19,610,477
2011	1,772,047	1,577,982	998,399	1,471,153	1,743,916	1,670,138	1,719,965	1,696,948	1,227,831	1,378,417	1,706,924	1,765,579	18,729,299
2012	1,767,029	1,650,456	1,751,254	1,621,961	1,738,311	1,678,238	1,716,979	1,723,812	1,238,671	1,200,884	1,708,873	1,761,729	19,558,197
2013	1,759,700	1,521,749	1,064,929	1,593,994	1,742,955	1,444,462	1,719,712	1,722,736	1,674,648	1,405,239	1,671,106	1,757,723	19,078,953
2014	1,766,152	1,573,760	1,289,366	1,045,619	1,734,271	1,664,928	1,559,250	1,572,578	1,123,013	1,260,339	1,707,757	1,763,157	18,060,190
2015	1,767,479	1,597,689	1,639,709	1,690,751	1,699,520	1,666,461	1,715,610	1,720,074	1,358,956	1,029,560	1,701,017	1,754,382	19,341,208
2016	1,770,487	1,651,326	1,073,319	1,698,641	1,686,965	1,658,443	1,715,368	1,718,451	1,673,737	1,744,574	1,705,910	1,763,008	19,860,229
2017	1,760,272	1,463,126	1,181,658	1,560,675	1,736,830	1,636,063	1,726,003	1,726,126	1,272,373	1,634,109	1,708,479	1,772,149	19,177,863
2018	1,778,425	1,595,567	1,769,826	1,708,980	1,746,083	1,677,112	1,666,049	1,728,966	1,251,325	1,545,491	1,716,325	1,774,977	19,959,126
2019	1,776,734	1,596,282	1,113,145	1,624,150	1,742,464	1,660,324	1,579,918	1,720,092	1,671,583	1,743,399	1,717,369	1,728,840	19,674,300
2020	1,769,498	1,649,399	1,064,981	1,676,789	1,749,791	1,586,667	1,722,035	1,274,347	1,350,907	1,749,984	1,500,222	1,763,198	18,857,818
2021	1,771,536	1,599,483	1,758,828	1,682,038	1,748,480	1,677,184	1,726,530	1,691,270	1,140,978	1,528,661	1,716,082	1,745,838	19,786,908
2022	1,766,154	1,581,724	1,005,105	1,488,894	1,634,978	1,680,528	1,690,426	1,734,548	1,688,918	1,763,780	1,708,724	1,771,427	19,515,206
2023	1,773,225	1,589,357	986,828	1,864,548	2,075,533	1,969,453	1,852,722	2,402,000	1,839,998	2,547,462	2,452,679	2,419,378	23,500,183
2024	2,440,742	2,396,014	2,808,229	2,796,427	3,347,115	3,045,617	3,066,161	3,335,603	2,202,990	2,732,845	2,464,777	3,235,291	33,871,811
2025	3,466,318	3,083,870	2,430,789	2,848,753	2,702,715	3,257,743	3,360,561	3,345,035	2,607,596	3,225,001	3,345,220	3,470,814	37,144,415
2026	3,469,411	2,898,695	2,302,096	2,880,863	2,877,786	3,268,701	3,340,174	3,358,578					--

=== Loss of power incident ===
A loss of electrical power in the plant occurred on March 20, 1990.

At 9:20 a.m., a truck carrying fuel and lubricants in the plant's 230 kV switchyard backed into a support column for the feeder line supplying power to the Unit 1-A reserve auxiliary transformer (RAT). At the time, the 1-B RAT was de-energized for maintenance and RAT 1-A was powering both trains of emergency electrical power. The non-emergency electrical trains were being powered by back-feeding from the switchyard through the main step-up transformer to the 1-A and 1-B unit auxiliary transformers (UAT). Emergency diesel generator (EDG) 1-B was out of service for planned maintenance.

After the power loss, EDG 1-A failed to start due to a protective safety trip. The resulting loss of electrical power in the plant's "vital circuits" shut down the residual heat removal (RHR) pump that was cooling the core of Unit 1 (which was nearing the end of a refueling outage) and prevented the backup RHR from activating. Even though Unit 1 was offline at the time, residual heat from the natural decay of the radioactive fuel must be removed to prevent a dangerous rise in core temperature. While the non-safety power was not interrupted, there was no physical connection between the vital and non-vital electrical trains, preventing the vital trains from receiving power from the unaffected path through the UATs.

At 9:40 a.m., the plant operators declared a site area emergency (SAE) per existing procedures which called for an SAE whenever "vital" power is lost for more than 15 minutes. At 9:56 a.m., after trying multiple times to start the 1-A EDG normally, plant operators performed an emergency startup of the EDG by activating the generator's emergency start "break-glass" which bypassed most of the EDG's safeties and forced it to start. The startup was successful.

RHR-A was then started using power from EDG-A. With core cooling restored, the SAE was downgraded to an alert at 10:15 a.m. At 11:40 a.m., crews energized RAT 1-B which had been shut down for maintenance, restoring power to the "B" safety electrical train. At 12:57 p.m., the "A" safety train was switched from the EDG to RAT 1-B and the EDG was shut down. With both trains receiving offsite power, the alert was terminated at 1:47 p.m.

The temperature of the Unit 1 core coolant increased from 90 °F (32 °C) to 136 °F (58 °C) during the 36 minutes required to re-energize the A-side bus. Throughout the event, non-vital power was continuously available to Unit 1 from off-site sources. However, the Vogtle electrical system was not designed to permit easy interconnection of the Unit 1 vital busses to non-vital power or the Unit 2 electrical busses. Since this incident, Plant Vogtle has implemented changes to the plant that allow the non-vital electrical buses to transfer power to the vital buses in this type of scenario.

This electrical fault also affected Unit 2 by causing breakers in the 230 kV switchyard to trip, cutting off power to RAT 2-B and vital bus "B." EDG 2-B subsequently started and restored power to the vital bus. At the same time, the electrical disturbance from the falling line striking the ground was detected by protective safeties on the Unit 2 main step-up transformer and a protective relay actuated, opening the transformer's output breaker. This caused a full load rejection to Unit 2, leading to a turbine trip and subsequently, a reactor scram.

After Unit 2 tripped, the "B" non-vital electrical train lost power as it attempted to transfer from UAT 2-B (powered by the turbine generator) to the failed RAT 2-B, causing two of the reactor coolant pumps and one of the main feedwater pumps to trip. Despite this, plant cool-down proceeded safely. At 9:03 p.m., the RAT 2-B breakers in the switchyard were reset and offsite power was restored to the vital and non-vital "B" electrical trains, allowing reactor coolant pumps 2 and 4 to be restarted. EDG 2-B was shut down.

It was later determined that the fault disturbance caused by the line falling was not of significant magnitude to trip the protective relay per design and should not have caused Unit 2 to shut down. Further investigation found that current transformers on the main transformer were improperly set. The controls were adjusted to the proper setting. Had the CTs been properly set initially, the Unit 2 would have remained online.

== Units 3 and 4 ==
=== Planning phase ===
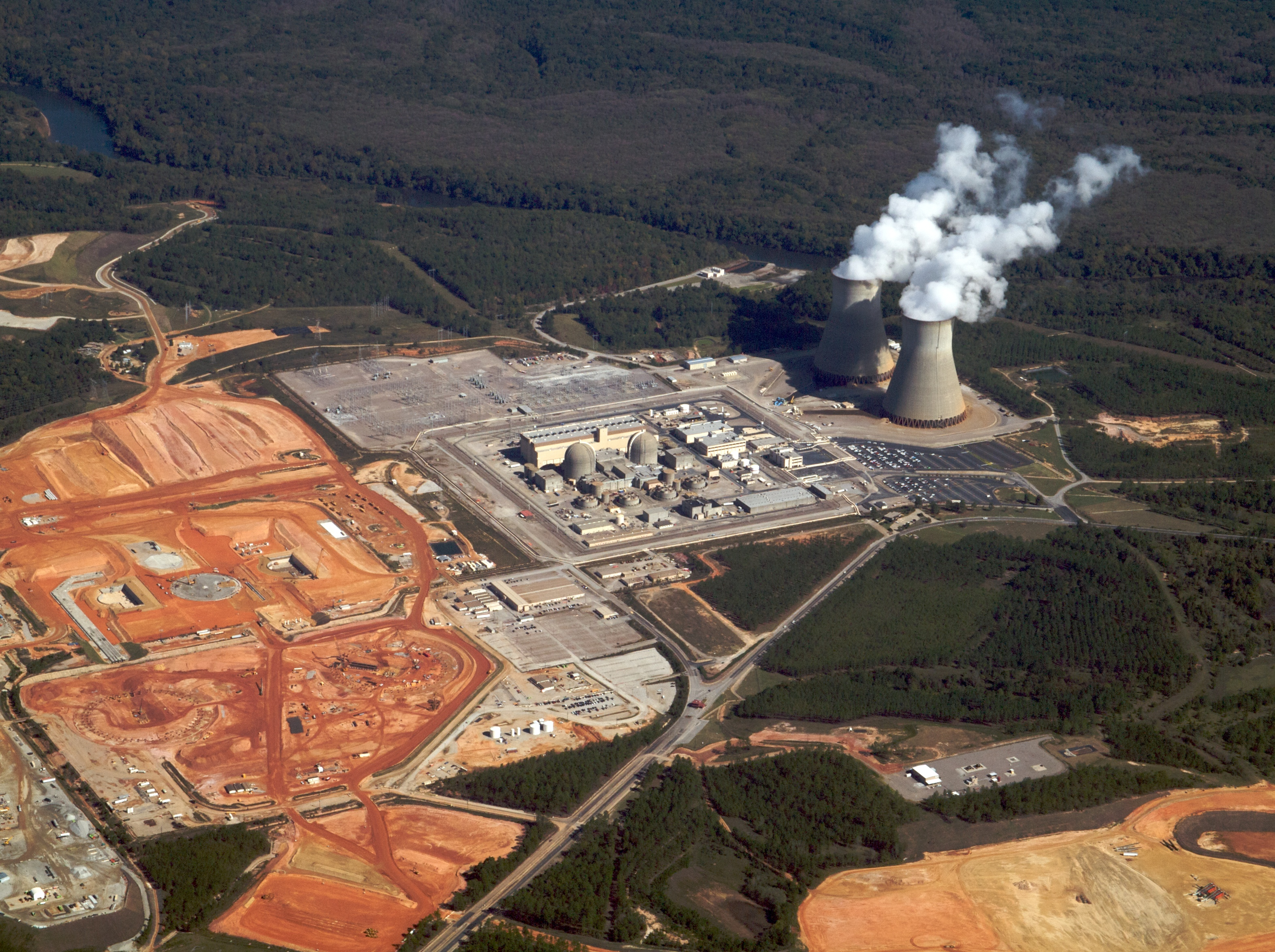
Construction underway at Vogtle, October 2011

Vogtle Unit 3 Condenser B time-lapse video

In August 2006, Southern Nuclear formally applied for an Early Site Permit (ESP) for two additional units, and in March 2008, submitted an application for a Combined Construction and Operating License (COL). In April 2008, Georgia Power Company reached a contract agreement for two AP1000 reactors designed by Westinghouse, owned by Toshiba. Westinghouse partnered with the Shaw Group (Baton Rouge, LA) and its Stone & Webster division to manage the project with Westinghouse responsible for engineering, design, and overall management, and Shaw responsible for manufacturing the pre-fabricated component modules and managing the on-site construction. The contract represented the first agreement for new nuclear development in the United States since the Three Mile Island accident in 1979. It received approval from the Georgia Public Service Commission in March 2009.

=== Construction ===
In August 2009, the Nuclear Regulatory Commission (NRC) issued an Early Site Permit and a Limited Work Authorization. Limited construction at the new reactor sites began, with Unit 3 then expected to be operational in 2016, followed by Unit 4 in 2017, pending final issuance of the Combined Construction and Operating License by the NRC.

In December 2011, taking into account findings from the Fukushima nuclear accident caused by the 2011 Tōhoku earthquake and tsunami, a 19th revision was written for the AP1000 Design Certification, which effectively included a complete redesign of the containment building:

The wall is appropriately reinforced and sized where the composite wall module joins the reinforced concrete sections and as appropriate to accommodate seismic loads and aircraft loads. This design is new to the amendment; previously the structure was all reinforced concrete. [emphasis added]

As this change to the design requirements was made after engineering contracts were already signed and manufacturing had begun on the reactor's long-lead-time components, it resulted in a halting of construction as the containment building had to be redesigned.

On February 16, 2010, President Barack Obama announced $8.33 billion in federal loan guarantees toward the construction cost, although as of December 2013, Georgia Power had not availed itself of those guarantees, at first awaiting the construction license, and after the construction stop lawsuit outcome. The expected building cost for the two reactors was $14 billion. Georgia Power's share was around $6.1 billion, while the remaining ownership of the two reactors is split among Oglethorpe Power Corp., the Municipal Electric Authority of Georgia (MEAG Power), and Dalton Utilities.

In February 2012, the NRC approved the construction license of the two proposed AP1000 reactors at Vogtle. NRC Chairman Gregory Jaczko cast the lone dissenting vote on plans to build and operate the two new nuclear power reactors, citing safety concerns stemming from Japan's 2011 Fukushima nuclear disaster, saying, "I cannot support issuing this license as if Fukushima never happened." One week after Southern Company received the license to begin construction, many environmental and anti-nuclear groups sued to stop the expansion project, claiming "public safety and environmental problems since Japan's Fukushima-Daiichi nuclear reactor accident have not been taken into account". On July 11, 2012, the lawsuit was rejected by the Washington D.C. Circuit Court of Appeals.

In February 2013, the project's construction contractor, Shaw, was purchased by Chicago Bridge & Iron Company (CB&I). On March 12, 2013, construction on Unit 3 officially began with the pour of the basemat concrete for the nuclear island. This operation was completed on March 14. During the weekend of June 1, 2013, assembly of the containment vessel began with the bottom head of the vessel being lifted into place on the nuclear island. By June 2013, the construction schedule had been extended by at least 14 months. On November 21, 2013, the basemat pour for Unit 4 was completed.

In February 2014, the Department of Energy approved a $6.5 billion loan guarantee for Southern Company subsidiary Georgia Power and Oglethorpe Power Corp. The Department of Energy initially demanded a credit subsidy fee, but the demand was ultimately dropped given the financial strength of Southern Co. and the Vogtle project.

Further delays and cost increases were incorporated in a revised schedule in early 2015. As a result of the increased delays and cost overruns, contractor CB&I exited the project and Westinghouse took direct control of the project as contractor and hired construction firm Fluor to replace CB&I/Shaw on-site managing the day-to-day work. Westinghouse purchased certain assets of the former Shaw Group from CB&I to allow the project to go forward. In 2016, Southern Company and Westinghouse added construction firm Bechtel to the project to share construction management responsibilities.

Recent construction milestones include setting the final of the "big six" structural modules for Unit 3 (CA-02 and CA-03, which form the walls of a storage tank that is part of the reactor's passive cooling system). The "big six" modules also include the previously installed CA-01, CA-04, and CA-05 in-containment structural modules, as well as the previously installed CA-20 structural module which forms part of the internal structure of the auxiliary building, containing many of the reactor's support systems.

CA-02 and CA-03 were placed within the containment vessel in May 2016. The setting of these modules is a fairly significant milestone and allows other construction activities to commence. In June 2016, the final reactor coolant pump for Unit 3 was received on site. In November 2016, the reactor vessel for Unit 3 was set within the nuclear island.

2017 progress includes the installation of the reactor coolant loop piping and both steam generators at Unit 3. Progress has also been made in the turbine, auxiliary, and annex building. Unit 4 has also seen progress with the installation of the final two "big six" structural modules. Construction of both cooling towers is complete, with each nearly 600 ft (180 m) tall.

==== Westinghouse bankruptcy 2017 ====
In March 2017, Westinghouse Electric Company filed for Chapter 11 bankruptcy due to losses from its two U.S. nuclear construction projects. The U.S. government has given $8.3 billion of loan guarantees to help finance construction of the Vogtle reactors, and a way forward to completing the plant has been agreed upon. On July 31, 2017 Southern Company division, Southern Nuclear, took over construction from Westinghouse and opened a bid for a new construction management contract to manage the day-to-day work on the site. Southern received bids from Fluor and Bechtel. On August 31, 2017, Southern announced its decision to move forward with Bechtel to be the day-to-day construction manager for the remainder of the project. Bechtel replaced Fluor, who would no longer be involved in the project.

=== Continuation of construction approved, 2017 ===
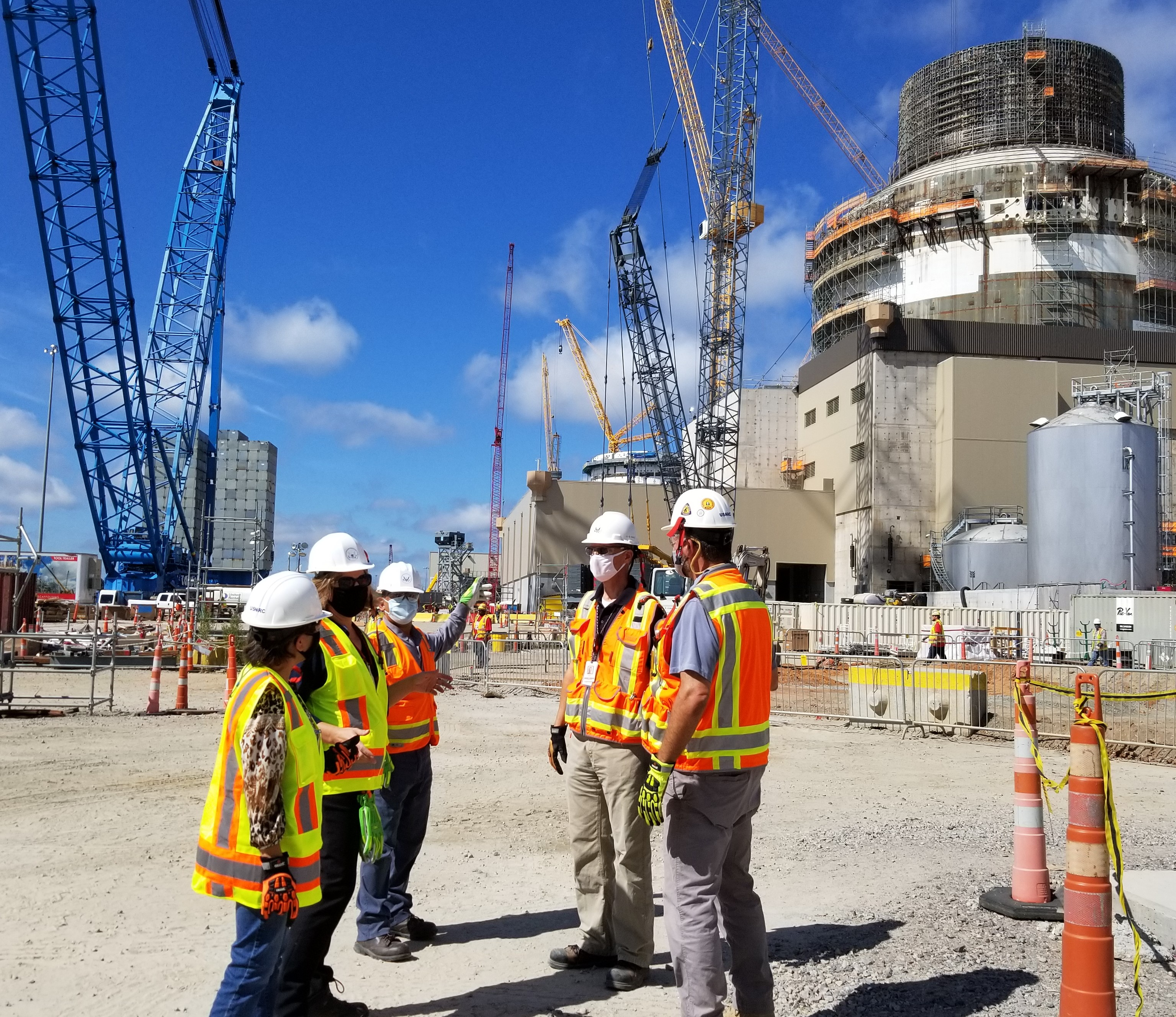
Vogtle Unit 3 under construction in October 2020

In November 2017 the Georgia Public Service Commission (GPSC) requested additional documentation following concerns that design blueprints had not been approved by appropriately licensed engineers, which has legal implications. On December 21, 2017, the PSC approved the continuation of construction on Units 3 and 4, with conditions that reduced the costs that can be recovered from ratepayers over the life of the project, causing a scheduled monthly consumer rate increase of $3.78 after first power.

In the February 2018 Vogtle Construction Monitoring Report (VCM), GPSC approved November 2021 and November 2022 as the target in-service dates for Units 3 & 4 respectively. The report notes that the project is being completed on an accelerated schedule and is tracking ahead of the 2021 & 2022 in-service target dates.

In August 2018 a $2.3 billion increase in costs was recognized. The total cost, including financing costs, is estimated at about $25 billion. In September 2018, in order to sustain the project, Georgia Power agreed to pay an additional proportion of the costs of the smaller project partners if the cost of completion went beyond $9.2 billion.

In March 2019 further federal loan guarantees of $3.7 billion were given to the various build partners, taking total federal loan guarantees up to $12 billion. The Georgia Power CEO said the loan guarantees played a key role in reducing financing costs for the build. Also in March 2019, Georgia Power confirmed that the Unit 3 containment cap had been lowered into place and the reactor would be ready to load nuclear fuel in 2020. This was preceded by the containment vessel third ring, as well as reactor coolant pump and polar crane installation in unit 3 during 2018 and 2019. The containment vessel's top head was set during a site visit by Secretary of Energy Rick Perry and executives of the plant's owners. Recent progress on unit 4 includes the installation of the final steam generator and pressurizer.

Unit 4 is being constructed utilizing lessons learned from Unit 3 and from the failed Virgil C. Summer Nuclear Generating Station (V.C. Summer) project and as a result, the order in which some components are being installed has been modified. On November 22, 2019 the third ring of the containment vessel was set for unit 4, and on December 8, 2019 the unit 3 shield building roof was set above the unit 3 containment vessel. On December 16, 2019 the control room of unit 3 became operational and available for testing systems. On February 11, 2020, Southern Nuclear announced that the final concrete placement inside the Unit 3 containment vessel was completed, allowing installation of the reactor's fueling machine. As of February 2020, assembly continued on the final topmost vertical feature of the overall Unit 3 reactor building, the passive containment cooling system storage tank, which will be set on top of the Shield Building Roof.

A three-month delay to completion of both units was announced in October 2021, with unit 3 expected operational in the third quarter of 2022 and unit 4 in the second quarter of 2023. In August 2022 a further delay was announced, first quarter of 2023 for unit 3 and the fourth quarter of 2023 for unit 4. Costs were expected to rise to over $30 billion due to the delays.

=== Commissioning process ===
On October 14, 2022, It was announced that Vogtle Unit 3 had begun loading nuclear fuel. In this process, technicians from Southern Nuclear and Westinghouse work together on the transferring of 157 fuel assemblies from the fuel pool to the reactor one at a time. Once this process is completed, the startup testing phase begins, where the integrity of the primary coolant system and steam systems is verified, and their functioning at design temperatures and pressures is ensured. Operators will also bring the units from a cold start to first criticality, where a sustained chain reaction is achieved. The unit will then be synchronized to the electric grid, as power is systematically raised to 100%. Vogtle Unit 3 was projected to enter service in the first quarter of 2023.

During start-up and pre-operational testing in February 2023 the plant's cooling system suffered from unexpected vibrations. Measures were taken to remedy the problem. The time-plan was set back so that the beginning of regular service was expected for May or June 2023. On March 6, 2023, Vogtle Unit 3 reached criticality for the first time. The unit was connected to the grid on April 1 and entered commercial operation on July 31.

On May 2, 2023, Georgia Power announced that Vogtle Unit 4 had completed hot functional testing which confirmed that the reactor was ready for its first fuel load. On August 18, 2023, fuel loading begins with 264 fuel elements at Unit 4. In October 2023, a reactor coolant pump in Unit 4 developed a motor fault, which delayed Unit 4's in-service date to the first quarter of 2024. Later, vibrations were found in a cooling system, putting back the in-service date to the second quarter of 2024. On February 14, 2024, Vogtle Unit 4 reached criticality for the first time. The unit was connected to the grid on March 1. Vogtle 4 entered commercial operation on April 29.

== Surrounding population ==
The Nuclear Regulatory Commission defines two emergency planning zones around nuclear power plants: a plume exposure pathway zone with a radius of 10 miles (16 km), concerned primarily with exposure to, and inhalation of, airborne radioactive contamination, and an ingestion pathway zone of about 50 miles (80 km), concerned primarily with ingestion of food and liquid contaminated by radioactivity.

In 2010, the population within 10 miles (16 km) of Vogtle was 5,845, a decrease of 16.3 percent over the previous decade. The population within 50 miles (80 km) was 726,640, an increase of 8.8 percent since 2000. Cities within 50 miles (80 km) include Augusta (26 miles (42 km) to city center).

== Reactors ==
Reactor unit	Reactor type	Capacity (MWe)		Construction started	Grid connection	Commercial operation	Shutdown
Reactor unit	Reactor type	Net (Summer)	Gross	Construction started	Grid connection	Commercial operation	Shutdown
Vogtle-1	Westinghouse; 4-loop	1150	1229	August 1, 1976	March 27, 1987	June 1, 1987	
Vogtle-2	Westinghouse; 4-loop	1152	1229	August 1, 1976	April 10, 1989	May 20, 1989	
Vogtle-3	AP1000	1117	1250	March 12, 2013	March 31, 2023	July 31, 2023	
Vogtle-4	AP1000	1117	1250	November 19, 2013	March 6, 2024	April 29, 2024	

== Seismic risk ==
The Nuclear Regulatory Commission's estimate of the risk each year of an earthquake intense enough to cause core damage to Vogtle 1 and 2 was 1 in 140,845, according to an NRC study published in August 2010.

== See also ==
- List of largest power stations in the United States
- List of power stations in Georgia (U.S. state)
- Olkiluoto Nuclear Power Plant
- Virgil C. Summer Nuclear Generating Station
