= Mid-Georgia Cogen =

Coordinates: 32°29′06″N 83°36′14″W

Mid-Georgia Cogen is a 308 MW electric combined cycle gas turbine power plant located in Kathleen, Georgia.

The plant is primarily used for peaking power. It lies in the southern part of the Warner Robins metropolitan area.

== History ==
The plant was developed by New Jersey headquartered GPU International as a merchant facility in the late 1990s. Prior to operation, a 50% stake was sold to Birmingham, Alabama based energy company Sonat. The plant became operational on June 1, 1998. In 1999, the plant won Power Engineering magazine's Project of the Year award.

Through a series of mergers and sales, the plant became solely owned by Atlantic Power Corporation and NorthernStar Generation.

In August 2026 Birmingham's Harbert Management Corporation acquired the plant for an undisclosed amount.

== Technical details ==
The plant supplies process steam for use in food manufacturing. Electrical generation is sold to Georgia Power Company. The plant uses two Siemens/Westinghouse gas turbines and paired Nooter-Erickson heat recovery steam generators with a steam turbine to generate steam and electricity. The gas turbines may be fueled by natural gas or fuel oil.
