= Edwin I. Hatch Nuclear Power Plant =

Nuclear power plant near Baxley, Georgia

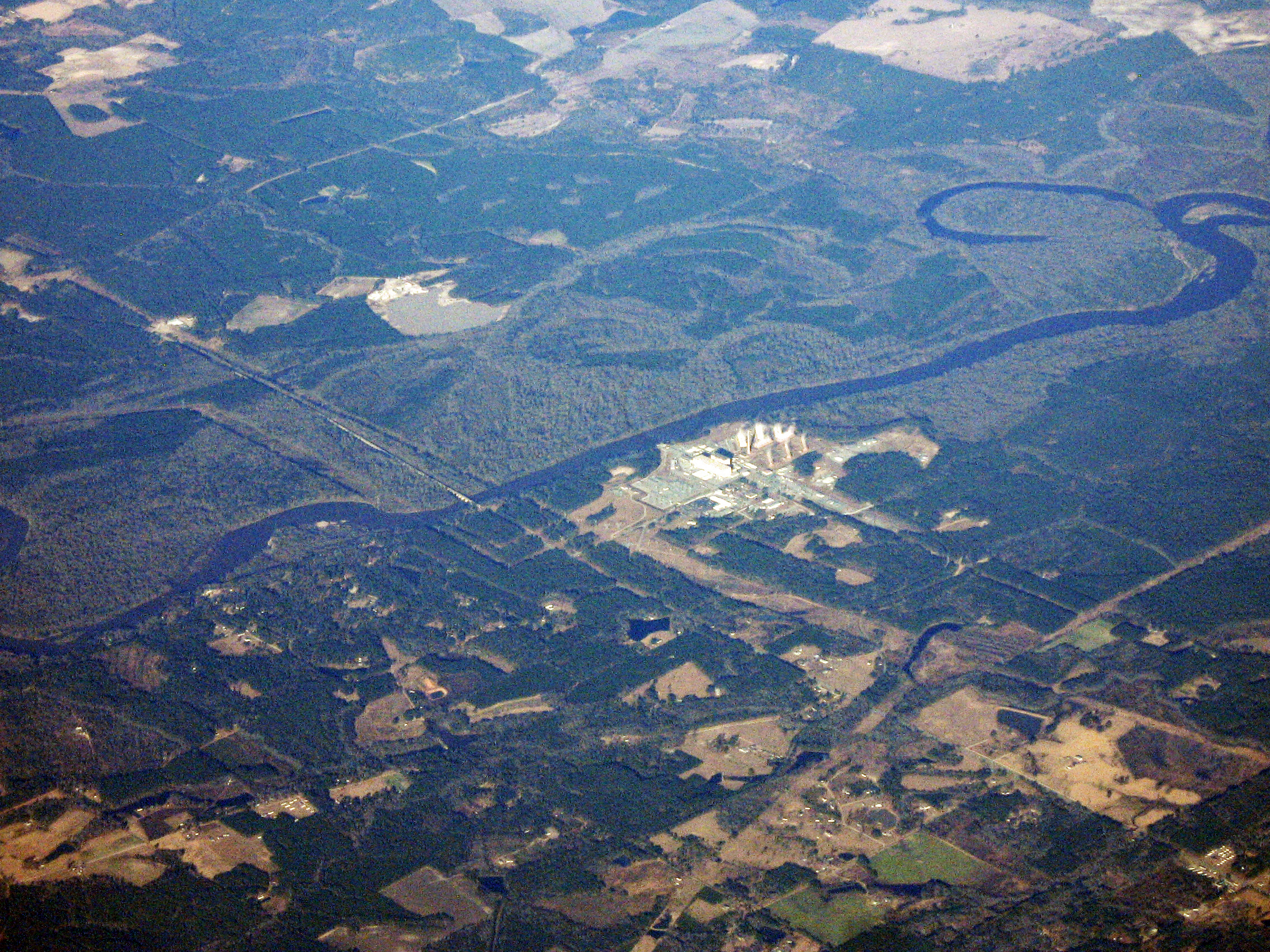
- E. I. Hatch Nuclear Power Plant near Baxley, Georgia.
- Country: United States
- Location: Baxley, Appling County, Georgia
- Coordinates: 31°56′3″N 82°20′38″W
- Status: Operational
- Construction began: Unit 1: September 30, 1968; Unit 2: February 1, 1972
- Commission date: Unit 1: December 31, 1975; Unit 2: September 5, 1979
- Construction cost: $3.214 billion (2007 USD)
- Owners: Georgia Power (50.1%); OPC (30%); MEAG (17.7%); Dalton Utilities (2.2%)
- Operator: Southern Nuclear

Nuclear power station
- Reactor type: BWR
- Reactor supplier: General Electric
- Cooling towers: 6 × Mechanical Draft
- Cooling source: Altamaha River
- Thermal capacity: 2 × 2804 MW_{th}

Power generation
- Units operational: 1 × 876 MW; 1 × 883 MW
- Make and model: BWR-4 (Mark 1)
- Nameplate capacity: 1759 MW
- Capacity factor: 94.30% (2017); 81.25% (lifetime)
- Annual net output: 14,165 GWh (2021

External links
- Website: Plant Hatch
- Commons: Related media on Commons

The Edwin Irby Hatch Nuclear Power Plant is near Baxley, Georgia, in the southeastern United States, on a 2,244-acre (9 km²) site. It has two General Electric boiling water reactors with a total capacity of 1,848 megawatts. Previously, the reactors had a combined capacity listing of 1,759 MW. Unit 1 went online in 1974 and was followed by Unit 2 in 1978. The plant was named for Edwin I. Hatch, president of Georgia Power from 1963 to 1975, and chairman from 1975 to 1978.

In 2002, the Nuclear Regulatory Commission (NRC) extended the operating licenses for both reactors for an additional twenty years.

In 2026 the plant was cleared to operate for 80 years, unit 1 until August 2054 and unit 2 until 2058.

== Ownership ==
The Hatch plant is operated by Southern Nuclear Operating Company, a subsidiary of Southern Company. Hatch's owners are:

- Georgia Power (50.1%) (also a Southern Company subsidiary)
- Oglethorpe Power Corporation (30%)
- Municipal Electric Authority of Georgia (17.7%)
- Dalton Water & Light Sinking Fund Commission (2.2%)

== Electricity production ==
Generation (MWh) of Edwin I. Hatch Nuclear Power Plant
Year	Jan	Feb	Mar	Apr	May	Jun	Jul	Aug	Sep	Oct	Nov	Dec	Annual (Total)
2001	1,293,069	1,170,555	1,235,570	1,228,926	1,293,283	1,249,637	1,285,502	1,287,504	887,694	724,050	1,262,124	1,162,794	14,080,708
2002	1,096,002	1,051,386	1,079,149	768,129	1,299,788	1,242,675	1,281,149	1,285,960	1,220,620	1,170,627	1,253,611	1,301,301	14,050,397
2003	1,306,083	1,159,832	660,970	921,735	1,240,258	1,226,216	1,276,981	1,273,185	1,240,679	1,256,654	1,244,926	1,301,912	14,109,431
2004	1,286,044	843,608	922,869	1,240,053	1,306,693	1,255,164	1,291,825	1,292,993	1,134,261	1,245,552	1,269,371	1,328,315	14,416,748
2005	1,060,127	674,786	1,010,550	1,232,364	1,170,619	1,273,402	1,303,481	1,305,268	1,266,796	1,255,578	914,894	1,253,365	13,721,230
2006	1,186,457	807,651	663,326	1,121,424	1,230,480	1,275,776	1,288,575	1,276,152	1,270,059	1,318,271	1,289,022	1,331,464	14,058,657
2007	1,183,710	600,166	911,243	1,284,721	1,311,571	1,262,831	1,309,161	1,230,470	1,262,814	1,313,417	1,255,942	1,322,059	14,248,105
2008	1,322,042	671,388	719,886	1,269,332	1,107,784	1,252,916	1,205,583	1,306,804	1,225,470	1,308,816	1,202,362	1,321,159	13,913,542
2009	1,316,335	752,616	655,970	626,578	281,700	1,154,041	1,259,304	1,299,970	1,268,416	1,250,367	1,211,294	1,320,064	12,396,655
2010	1,316,315	713,061	830,948	926,068	1,313,326	1,236,347	1,238,567	1,283,776	1,257,836	1,294,065	1,289,367	1,201,880	13,901,556
2011	1,237,841	1,198,354	1,205,375	633,895	978,037	1,199,385	1,243,944	1,207,702	1,193,230	1,073,430	1,273,956	1,131,733	13,576,882
2012	1,274,287	830,447	838,916	1,259,959	1,153,449	1,257,481	1,291,743	1,282,836	1,266,753	1,312,943	1,284,261	1,330,362	14,383,437
2013	1,284,903	446,460	875,154	1,251,469	1,321,199	1,226,954	1,271,402	1,300,051	1,098,399	1,189,234	1,256,398	1,302,205	13,823,828
2014	1,273,424	626,551	1,176,121	1,281,033	1,309,660	1,218,842	1,306,695	1,303,805	1,253,006	1,320,466	1,289,516	1,150,873	14,509,992
2015	1,211,828	745,614	963,562	1,254,002	1,318,135	1,262,976	1,302,734	1,280,320	1,241,785	1,323,246	1,285,540	1,307,512	14,497,254
2016	1,271,051	742,270	1,216,578	1,199,095	1,186,709	1,225,574	1,308,365	1,309,027	1,245,472	1,323,921	1,276,742	1,315,629	14,620,433
2017	1,168,298	705,629	1,312,674	987,573	1,267,405	1,271,768	1,314,568	1,309,532	1,272,109	1,304,773	1,293,513	1,323,100	14,530,942
2018	1,289,208	607,958	1,240,495	1,194,391	1,065,959	1,267,108	1,310,789	1,312,149	1,258,010	1,271,257	1,287,877	1,298,349	14,403,550
2019	1,286,342	648,230	739,359	1,278,621	1,178,061	1,249,435	1,306,082	1,299,698	1,081,605	1,260,279	1,286,082	1,303,087	13,916,881
2020	1,241,759	622,847	903,310	1,043,023	1,320,639	1,101,674	1,305,935	1,302,460	1,257,246	1,299,025	1,254,394	1,315,567	13,967,879
2021	1,272,328	719,106	1,107,281	1,236,136	1,324,183	1,109,247	1,100,158	1,205,197	1,259,821	1,318,620	1,288,533	1,224,458	14,165,068
2022	1,229,473	686,846	1,234,441	1,288,711	1,231,071	1,270,709	1,309,478	1,310,105	1,261,036	1,159,713	1,276,435	1,300,367	14,980,384
2023	1,184,233	591,498	1,242,450	1,238,560	1,210,879	1,279,544	1,314,232	1,248,789	1,271,553	1,328,504	1,126,592	1,303,390	15,340,224
2024	1,235,996	677,657	872,382	1,285,982	1,317,725	1,269,084	1,222,416	1,309,202	1,128,474	1,248,911	1,285,434	1,250,785	14,104,048
2025	1,223,684	725,327	800,307	1,262,261	1,316,941	1,220,529	1,174,589	1,318,889	1,138,642	1,322,383	1,257,822	1,319,004	14,080,378
2026	888,998	607,323	1,274,244	1,177,670	1,156,196	1,274,143	1,310,627	1,312,508					--

== Surrounding population ==
The Nuclear Regulatory Commission defines two emergency planning zones around nuclear power plants: a plume exposure pathway zone with a radius of 10 miles (16 km), concerned primarily with exposure to, and inhalation of, airborne radioactive contamination, and an ingestion pathway zone of about 50 miles (80 km), concerned primarily with ingestion of food and liquid contaminated by radioactivity.

The 2010 U.S. population within 10 miles (16 km) of Hatch was 11,061, an increase of 6.7 percent in a decade, according to an analysis of U.S. Census data for msnbc.com. The 2010 U.S. population within 50 miles (80 km) was 424,741, an increase of 12.0 percent since 2000. Cities within 50 miles include Vidalia (19 miles to city center).

== Onsite storage of spent nuclear fuel ==
Spent nuclear fuel is stored on-site in concrete casks. The Hatch Plant, a BWR, near Baxley GA is estimated by DOE, as of this year, to have generated 1,446 metric tons of spent fuel.

== Seismic risk ==
The Nuclear Regulatory Commission's estimate of the risk each year of an earthquake intense enough to cause core damage to the reactor at Hatch was 1 in 454,545, according to an NRC study published in August 2010.
