= Oglethorpe Power =

American power company

Oglethorpe Power Corporation
- Company type: Cooperative
- Industry: Electric utility
- Founded: 1974
- Headquarters: Tucker, Georgia
- Area served: Georgia, United States
- Key people: Annalisa Bloodworth (President and CEO); Elizabeth B. Higgins (Executive Vice President and CFO); William F. Ussery (Executive Vice President, Member Relations); Heather H. Telihet (Executive Vice President, External Affairs); Rich D. Wallen (Executive Vice President and COO); Jami G. Reusch (Senior Vice President, Human Resources); Suzanne N. Roberts (Senior Vice President and General Counsel)
- Products: Electricity generation
- Total assets: $16 billion (2025)
- Members: 38 electric membership corporations
- Number of employees: 379
- Website: https://www.opc.com

Oglethorpe Power Corporation is an American medium-sized electric utility in Georgia, United States. Formed in 1974, Oglethorpe is a not-for-profit cooperative owned by the 38 electric membership corporations that it serves. The utility's headquarters are in Tucker, Georgia.

== History ==
In 1935, the Rural Electrification Administration (REA) provided loans for building transmission lines in rural areas, and EMCs were created in Georgia to purchase power from various sources. In 1974, 39 Georgia-based EMCs incorporated Oglethorpe Power Corporation to invest in generating capacities and transmission lines.

In 1996, Oglethorpe Power signed a 15-year, $4–5 billion deal with LG&E to receive half of its electricity needs from the Kentucky-based power supplier, with a locked down price on the coal-fired megawatt that LG&E must maintain.

In 1997, Oglethorpe restructured into three separate, but interrelated, cooperatives. Oglethorpe Power Corporation handles electricity generation, Georgia Transmission Corporation owns and operates the transmission lines and substations and Georgia System Operations Corporation provides system and administrative support.

In September 2008, Oglethorpe Power announced the construction of a massive woody biomass power plant (two 100-megawatt-per-year, carbon-neutral facilities) to power nearly half of Georgia's population.

In 2017, the turmoil surrounding the failed deliveries of nuclear reactors by bankrupted Westinghouse put Oglethorpe Power at the forefront of the country's nuclear crisis.

== Activity ==
Oglethorpe Power is the largest power supply cooperative in the United States based upon assets and annual kilowatt-hour sales. The utility's service area covers 65 percent of the state of Georgia. Ogelthorpe co-owns several of its plants with Georgia Power (largest electricity supplier in the state) and the Municipal Electric Authority of Georgia.

Oglethorpe's power plants have an annual revenue of $1 billion and assets of over $7 billion, and 4.1 million customers (2011). About 24% of the capacity is coal, 47% natural gas, 19% nuclear and 10% hydroelectric power (2009).

Oglethorpe Power owns 817 megawatts of the 1,095-megawatt Rocky Mountain Hydroelectric Plant, a pure pumped-storage hydroelectric plant that stores energy during periods of low electricity demand and produces electricity during periods of high demand. The utility's nuclear power comes from its partial ownership of the Edwin I. Hatch Nuclear Generating Station and the Alvin W. Vogtle Electric Generating Plant. It has partial ownership of two coal plants and full ownership of 3 combined cycle power plants and several gas turbine power plants.

Oglethorpe is a 30% partner in the project to build two new AP1000 nuclear reactors at Vogtle, and has $3 billion of Department of Energy loan guarantees for the project. In 2018 it sought more loan guarantees to cover cost overruns on the project. Lead partner Georgia Power agreed to pay an additional proportion of any project completion costs beyond $9.2 billion.

== Governance ==
There is a board of directors composed of directors and managers from EMCs (Electric Membership Cooperatives) and an independent director. The company's leadership team consists of a President and CEO, Executive and Senior Vice Presidents.

=== Leadership ===
Annalisa M. Bloodworth	President and chief executive officer
Elizabeth B. Higgins	Executive Vice President and Chief Financial Officer
William F. Ussery	Executive Vice President, Member Relations
Heather H. Telihet	Executive Vice President, External Affairs
Rich D. Wallen	Executive Vice President and Chief Operating Officer
Jami G. Reusch	Senior Vice President, Human Resources
Suzanne N. Roberts	Senior Vice President and General Counsel

=== Board of directors ===
Marshall S. Millwood	Chairman, Sawnee EMC
James I. White	Vice Chairman, Snapping Shoals EMC
George L. Weaver	Central Georgia EMC
Ronnie Hendricks	Upson EMC
Fred A. McWhorter	Rayle EMC
Ernest A. “Chip” Jakins III	Jackson EMC
Jeffrey W. Murphy	Hart EMC
Sam Simonton	Walton EMC
Danny Nichols	Colquitt EMC
Horace H. Weathersby III	Planters EMC
Jimmy G. Bailey	Diverse Power
Chris Stephens	Coweta-Fayette EMC
Kevin Bush	Outside Director
