= Hayes Crossing, Georgia =

Unincorporated community in Georgia, U.S.

Coordinates: 34°31′52″N 83°17′36″W

Hayes Crossing is an unincorporated community in Stephens County, Georgia, United States. It sits at 944 feet (288 m) above mean sea level.

== History ==
The community was named after William Hayes, an early settler.

=== Red Hollow Road ===
Hayes Crossing was connected to other communities in early colonial Georgia after General Oglethorpe ordered River Road built from Savannah to Augusta. River Road connected to the ancient Indian trade route of Upper Cherokee Path (later renamed Petersburg Road) at Augusta, connecting it to the market city of Petersburg. The Upper Cherokee Path continued 70 miles (110 km) from Petersburg to Toccoa, where it intersected with the Unicoi Turnpike, which continued into eastern Tennessee. The section of the Cherokee Path passing through Toccoa was known as the Red Hollow Road, and passed through the community of Hayes Crossing. A Georgia Historical Marker was erected in 1986 to commemorate the road.

=== Railroad station ===
In 1878, the Georgia Southern Railroad laid track in Stephens County, crossing the Red Hollow Road 13 times between Toccoa and Martin. Stations were established at several locations in the county, including one at Hayes Crossing.
