= Georgia State Route 328 =

Highway in Georgia, United States

State Route 328
- Gumlog Road
- SR 328 highlighted in red

Route information
- Maintained by GDOT
- Length: 9.7 mi (15.6 km)
- Existed: June 1, 1963–present

Major junctions
- West end: SR 17 in Avalon
- East end: SR 59 in Lavonia

Location
- Country: United States
- State: Georgia
- Counties: Franklin, Stephens

Highway system
- Georgia State Highway System; Interstate; US; State; Special
← SR 327	→ SR 329

State Route 328 (SR 328) is an arc-shaped 9.7-mile-long (15.6 km) state highway in the northeast part of the U.S. state of Georgia. The route connects Avalon and Lavonia and provides access to Lake Hartwell and Tugaloo State Park. It is known as Gumlog Road for its entire length.

== History ==
The roadway that would eventually become SR 328 was built in the mid-1950s on a nearly straight line from Avalon to just northeast of Lavonia. In the early 1960s, SR 328 was designated along its current alignment.

== Major intersections ==
County	Location	mi	km	Destinations	Notes
Stephens	Avalon	0.0	0.0	SR 17 – Lavonia, Toccoa	Western terminus
Franklin	Lavonia	9.7	15.6	SR 59 (Vickery Street) – Anderson	Eastern terminus of SR 328; roadway continues as Edgewood Drive.
1.000 mi = 1.609 km; 1.000 km = 0.621 mi
