= Stephens County School District =

School district in Georgia (U.S. state)

Address
- 191 Big A School Road Toccoa, Georgia, 30577-0663; United States
- Coordinates: 34.540538°N 83.329597°W

District information
- Grades: Pre-K – 12
- Superintendent: Dr. Connie Franklin
- Accreditations: Southern Association of Colleges and Schools; Georgia Accrediting Commission

Students and staff
- Enrollment: 4,405
- Faculty: 304

Other information
- Telephone: (706) 886-9415
- Fax: (706) 886-3882
- Website: www.stephenscountyschools.com

The Stephens County School District is a public school district in Stephens County, Georgia, United States, based in Toccoa. It serves the communities of Avalon, Martin, Eastanollee, and Toccoa.

== Schools ==
The Stephen's County School District has four elementary schools, one middle school, and one high school.

=== Elementary schools ===
- Big A Elementary School
- Liberty Elementary School
- Toccoa Elementary School
- Fifth Grade Academy

=== Middle school ===
- Stephens County Middle School

=== High school ===
- Stephens County High School
