= Doc Ayers (American football) =

American football player and coach (1922–2020)

- Born: Howard Edward Ayers; October 30, 1921; Toccoa
- Died: December 19, 2020 (aged 99)
- Occupations: American high school and college football coach.

Howard Edwards "Doc" Ayers (October 30, 1921 – December 19, 2020), was an American high school and college football coach.

== Career ==
=== Football career ===
Ayers played high school football in his hometown of Toccoa, Georgia and at Darlington high school in Rome, Georgia. He played halfback. Ayers earned All Mid Conference honors and went to the University of Georgia on a scholarship he had received where he also played football. While playing at Georgia, Ayers sustained a knee injury at practice that ended his football career. Ayers helped coach the Georgia B team after his injury and was also a student trainer in 1946 through 1947.

=== Coaching career ===
Ayers' first head coaching job was in Lavonia, Georgia. He compiled a record of twenty-five wins, three losses, and two no contests.

Ayers would go on to coach at Winder, Georgia before making his way to Cedartown in 1952. Ayers was a big hit in Cedartown, known for his motivational half time speeches and his ability to get his players fired up before games.

In Ayers' time in Cedartown, he would gather a record of ninety one wins, forty three losses, and five no contests. He would capture two region championships, seven sub region championships, and eventually a state championship in 1963. Ayers still holds the all-time record for most wins as a coach at Cedartown. The high school stadium would later be named “Doc” Ayers Memorial Stadium in commemoration to him.

In 1964, Ayers would become an assistant coach to Vince Dooley at the University of Georgia where he would coach for seventeen years. “Doc” coached the freshman team and was part of recruiting. While coaching the freshman team, Ayers compiled a record of twenty-eight wins with twelve losses—the best record in Georgia Football History.

=== Post coaching ===
Ayers was still very involved with the Cedartown football program. Once a week, he made an appearance at the Bulldogs' practice and gave motivational speeches to the team he loved and coached for so many years.

A charitable golf tournament named the Doc Ayers - Ray Beck golf tournament is held annually in Cedartown. Ayers co- hosted the tournament with Ray Beck at Cherokee Country Club. All the money from the tournament goes to the Polk County Community Foundation. Many former pro football and baseball players attend every year.

== Accomplishments ==
Howard Ayers received many honors including Georgia State Class AAA Coach of the year and has been inducted into the Georgia Sports Hall of Fame. His last accomplishment was the induction into the Piedmont College Hall of Fame in 2008.

== Personal life ==
Ayers was born in Toccoa, Georgia. He was the son of Dr. and Mrs. C. L. Ayers. The nickname “Doc” came to him because his father was a medical doctor. He married Connie Terrell who graduated from Shorter College. They had three children together; Bucky, Bunny, and Buzzy.

He died in December 2020 at the age of 99.
