= North Georgia Technical College =

Coordinates: 34°38′21.41″N 83°31′51.39″W

North Georgia Technical College (NGTC) is a public technical college in Clarkesville, Georgia, with additional campuses in Toccoa (known as the Currahee campus, named after nearby Currahee Mountain) and Blairsville. It is part of the Technical College System of Georgia. The college serves Habersham, Stephens, Union, Fannin, White, Rabun, Towns, and Franklin counties.

It had an enrollment of 2,599 students in fall 2024.

NGTC is accredited by the Commission on Colleges of the Southern Association of Colleges and Schools to award associate degrees. It is also accredited by the Council on Occupational Education. As of 2022 NGTC no longer has an Engineering Associates program.

== History ==
North Georgia Technical College's Clarkesville Campus was originally the home of the Georgia Ninth District School of Agriculture and Mechanical Arts (The A&M), which was active from 1907 until 1933. From 1938 to 1943, the campus was home to "Habersham College" and the National Youth Administration, one of President Franklin Delano Roosevelt's programs during the Great Depression.

Recognizing the need for occupational training for Georgians, the Georgia General Assembly created a vocational division in the State Board of Education, which approved a plan to establish a system of state vocational schools in October 1943. The initial location for North Georgia Trade and Vocational School was chosen in 1943, and the school accepted its first student in February 1944.

As the demand for technical training grew, more courses were added. In 1962, the school's name was changed to North Georgia Technical and Vocational School. On July 1, 1985, North Georgia Tech was placed under the governance of the new state board, now called the Technical College System of Georgia. In 1987, the name was changed to North Georgia Technical Institute.

The Clarkesville Campus of North Georgia Technical College is located in a mountain setting off Georgia Highway 197, one and a half miles north of Clarkesville, the county seat of Habersham County. It spans over 339 acres, with the campus itself covering approximately 40 acres. The campus is situated 30 miles northeast of Gainesville, 50 miles north of Athens, Georgia, and 90 miles northeast of Atlanta. It is accessible via Interstate 85, Interstate 985 and Georgia Highway 365.

As part of former Governor Zell Miller's commitment to bringing a post-secondary institution within 40 miles of every Georgian, the 1995 legislative session allocated 5.5 million dollars to construct a state-of-the-art facility. This facility was intended to be located on 25 acres along the Zell Miller Mountain Parkway, just outside the town of Blairsville. Union County generously donated the land on which the Blairsville Campus is situated. The 45,000+ square foot facility was constructed on a knoll, providing a dramatic view of the beautiful Blue Ridge Mountains. Classes began on September 30, 1998, at the Blairsville Campus of North Georgia Technical Institute.

On July 1, 2000, House Bill 1187 was made into law. This paved the way for Georgia's technical institutes to become technical colleges. North Georgia Technical Institute became North Georgia Technical College on October 10, 2000.

== Athletics ==
For a period of time beginning in 2011, NGTC competed in intercollegiate cross country as a member of the National Junior College Athletic Association and the Georgia Collegiate Athletic Association. However, as of 2016 the official athletics page no longer discusses intercollegiate competition, and the GCAA does not include NGTC in its membership list.
