= Tugaloo State Park =

State park in Lavonia, Georgia, US

- IUCN category V (protected landscape/seascape)
- Tugaloo State Park main beach
- Interactive map of Tugaloo State Park
- Location: Franklin County, Georgia, U.S.
- Nearest city: Lavonia
- Coordinates: 34°29′41″N 83°04′05″W
- Area: 393 acres (1.59 km^{2})
- Operator: Georgia State Parks & Historic Sites
- Website: gastateparks.org/Tugaloo

Tugaloo State Park is a 393 acres (1.59 km^{2}) state park located on the shore of Lake Hartwell in Franklin County, Georgia. The park features a swimming beach, boat ramps, and ample fishing opportunities, and is located near S.R. 328 north of Lavonia.

== Facilities ==
- 393 Acres
- 108 Tent, Trailer, and RV Campsites ($27–$30)
- 6 Primitive Campsites
- 20 Cottages
- Swimming beach
- Tennis courts
- 7 Picnic shelters
- Group shelter
- Pioneer campground
- 6 Yurts
