= Phil Landrum =

American politician

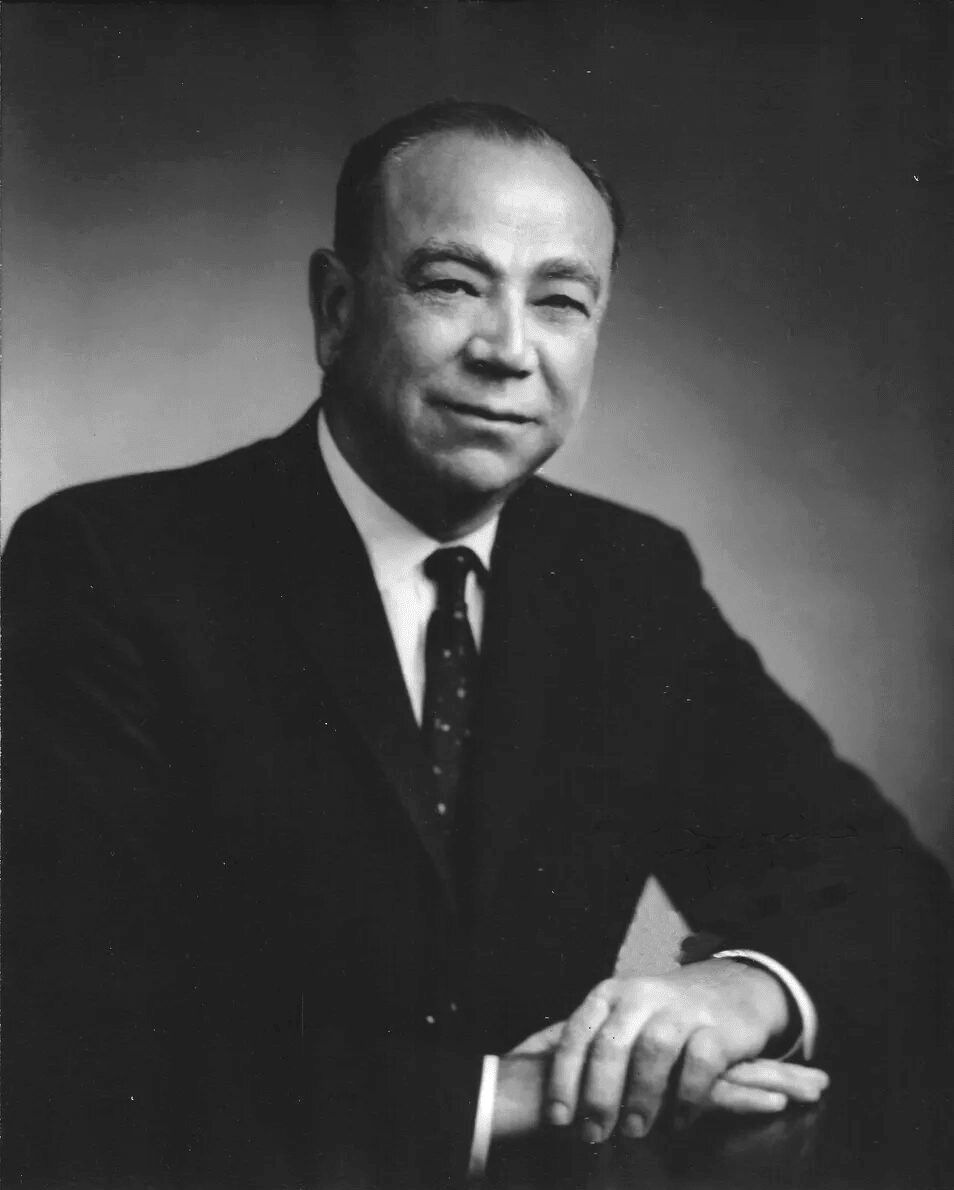

Member of the U.S. House of Representatives from Georgia's 9th district
- In office January 3, 1953 – January 3, 1977
- Preceded by: John S. Wood
- Succeeded by: Ed Jenkins

Personal details
- Born: Phillip Mitchell Landrum; September 10, 1907 Martin, Georgia, U.S.
- Died: November 19, 1990 (aged 83) Jasper, Georgia, U.S.
- Party: Democratic
- Education: Piedmont College, Atlanta Law School

Phillip Mitchell Landrum (September 10, 1907 – November 19, 1990) was an American lawyer, World War II veteran, and politician who served twelve terms as a Democratic U.S. representative from Georgia from 1953 to 1977.

== Biography ==
Born in Martin, Georgia, Landrum attended the public schools and Mercer University, in Macon, Georgia. He graduated from Piedmont College, in Demorest, Georgia (A.B., 1939) and from the Atlanta Law School (LL.B., 1941). While in college and law school, Landrum worked as Superintendent of Nelson (Georgia) High School (1937–1941). He was admitted to the bar in 1941 and commenced the practice of law in Canton, Georgia.

=== World War II ===
During the Second World War, Landrum enlisted as a private in the United States Army Air Corps on October 2, 1942. He served in Europe and was discharged on June 1, 1945, as a first lieutenant.

=== Early career ===
After his discharge from the military, Landrum was briefly employed by the Veterans' Administration. He then served as assistant attorney general of the State of Georgia in 1946-1947, and as Executive secretary to Governor Melvin E. Thompson in 1947-1948.

=== Congress ===
He returned to the practice of law in Jasper, Georgia until he was elected as a Democrat to the Eighty-third and to the eleven succeeding Congresses (January 3, 1953 – January 3, 1977). While he easily won twelve general elections, he faced strong opposition in several primary elections, including from a young Zell Miller in 1964 and 1966.

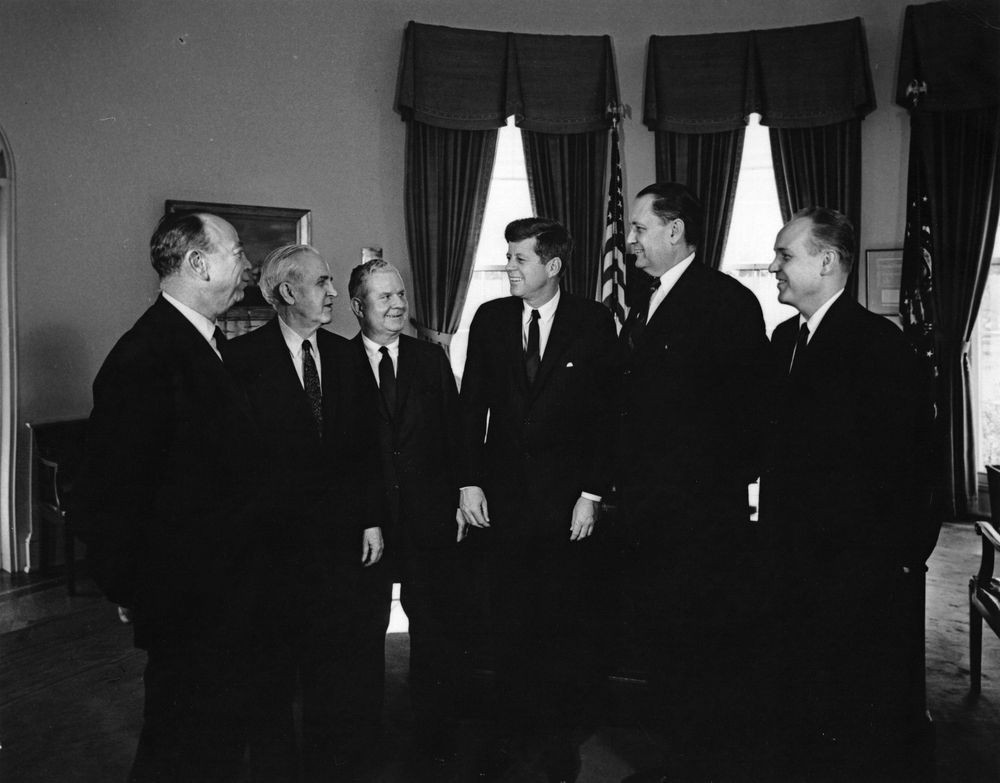
President John F. Kennedy meets with members of Congress. Left to right: Representative Phil M. Landrum (Georgia); Representative James William Trimble (Arkansas); Representative Harris B. McDowell, Jr. (Delaware); President Kennedy; Representative Carl Elliott (Alabama); Representative Stanley R. Tupper (Maine). Oval Office, White House, Washington, D.C.

Landrum was one of the primary sponsors of the Labor Management Reporting and Disclosure Act, also known as the Landrum-Griffin Act. He was also the author of the Economic Opportunity Act of 1964, one of the key pieces of legislation of President Lyndon Johnson's War on Poverty.

==== Segregationist ====
A staunch segregationist, in 1956, Landrum signed "The Southern Manifesto." Landrum voted against the Civil Rights Acts of 1957, the Civil Rights Acts of 1960, the Civil Rights Acts of 1964, and the Civil Rights Acts of 1968 as well as the 24th Amendment to the U.S. Constitution and the Voting Rights Act of 1965.

=== Retirement and death ===
He was not a candidate for re-election in 1976. He was a resident of Jasper until his death on November 19, 1990.

=== Legacy ===
Interstate 575 is named in his honor.

== Notes ==
U.S. House of Representatives
Preceded by John S. Wood	Member of the U.S. House of Representatives from Georgia's 9th congressional district January 3, 1953 – January 3, 1977	Succeeded by Ed Jenkins
