= Toccoa Airport =

Airport near Toccoa, Georgia, US

Toccoa Airport R.G. LeTourneau Field
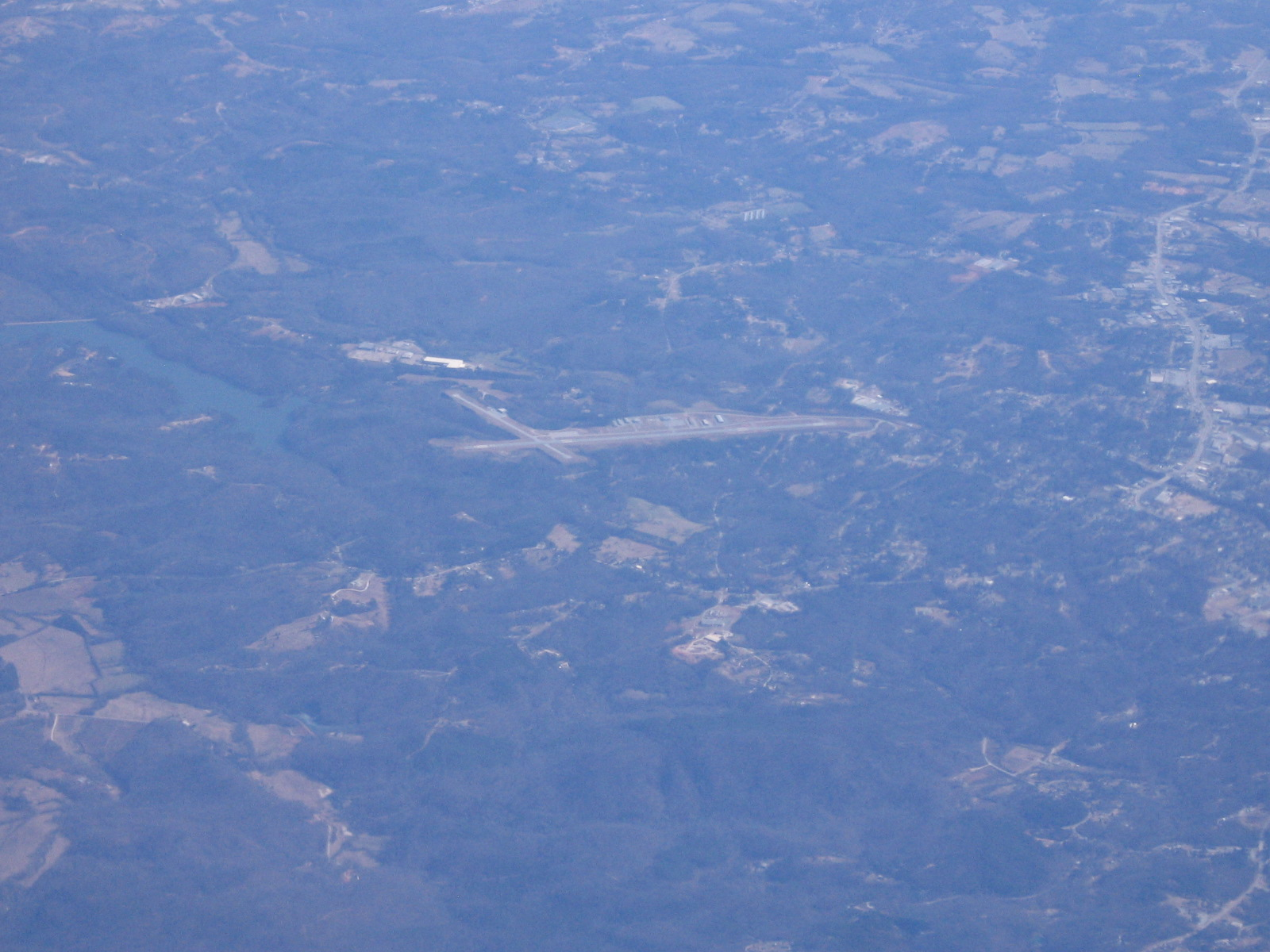
- IATA: TOC; ICAO: KTOC; FAA LID: TOC

Summary
- Airport type: Public
- Owner: Toccoa-Stephens County Authority
- Serves: Toccoa, Georgia
- Elevation AMSL: 996 ft (304 m)
- Coordinates: 34°35′34″N 083°17′47″W
- Website: stephenscountyga.gov/airport/
- Interactive map of Toccoa Airport

Runways
Direction	Length		Surface
Direction	ft	m	Surface
3/21	5,008	1,526	Asphalt
9/27	2,951	899	Asphalt

Statistics (2022)
- Aircraft operations: 20,000
- Based aircraft: 37
- Source: Federal Aviation Administration

Toccoa Airport (IATA: TOC, ICAO: KTOC, FAA LID: TOC), also known as R. G. LeTourneau Field, is a public use airport located two nautical miles (3.7 km) northeast of the central business district of Toccoa, a city in Stephens County, Georgia, United States. It is owned by the Toccoa-Stephens County Authority. According to the FAA's National Plan of Integrated Airport Systems for 2009–2013, it is categorized as a general aviation airport.

Local businessman and aviation buff R. G. LeTourneau created the airport in the late 1930s when he built two runways for his personal use. LeTourneau donated the runways to the city and county in 1961 and the airfield was named in his honor.

== Facilities and aircraft ==
A Piper Archer TX of Middle Georgia State University at Toccoa Airport

The airport covers an area of 285 acres (115 ha) at an elevation of 996 feet (304 m) above mean sea level. It has two asphalt paved runways: 3/21 is 5,008 by 100 feet (1,526 x 30 m) and 9/27 is 2,951 by 50 feet (899 x 15 m).

For the 12-month period ending December 31, 2022, the airport had 20,000 general aviation aircraft operations, an average of 55 per day. At that time there were 37 aircraft based at this airport: 31 single-engine, 5 multi-engine, and 1 jet.

== See also ==
- List of airports in Georgia (U.S. state)
