= The Toccoa Record =

Weekly newspaper in Toccoa, Georgia

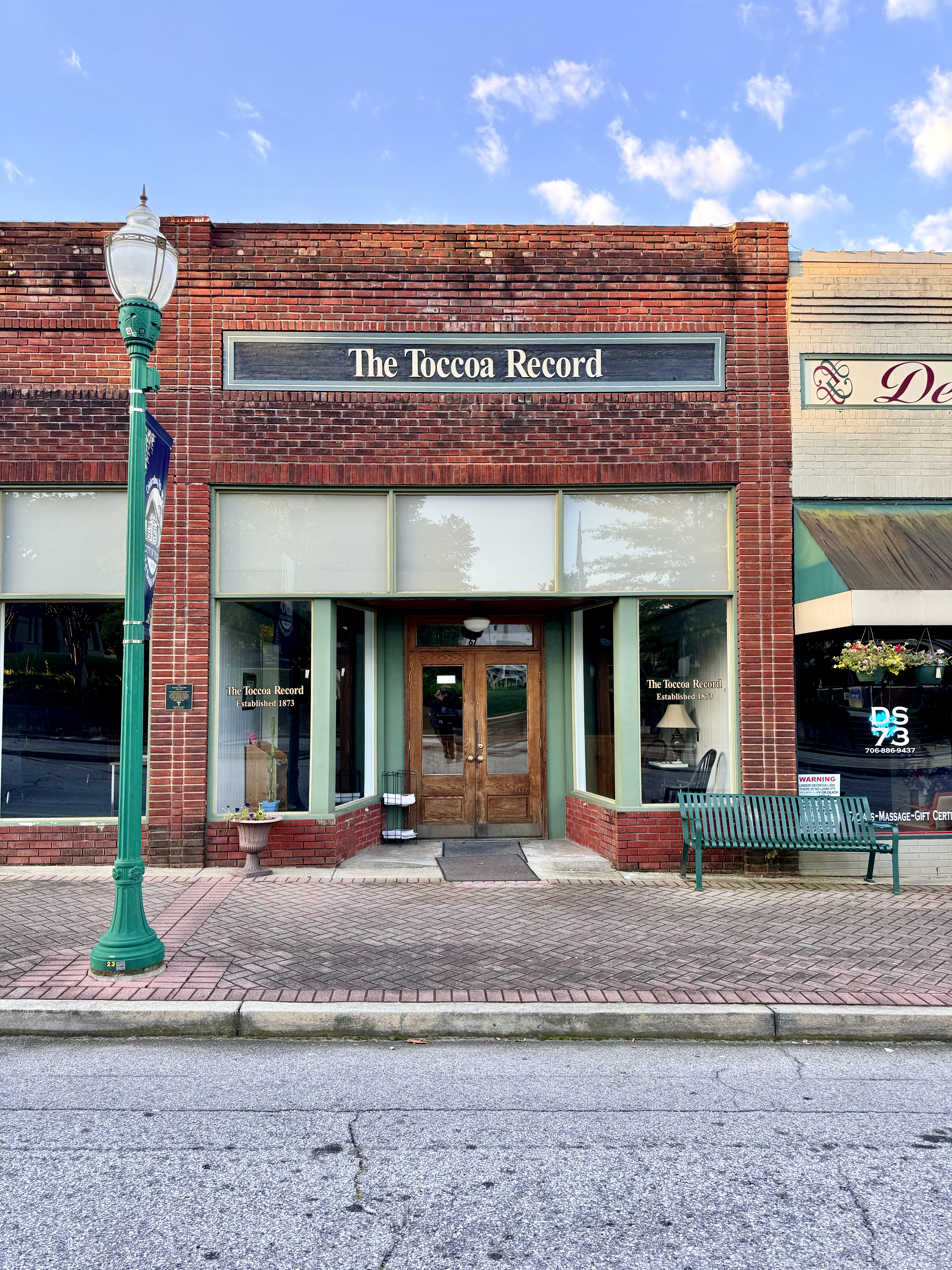
- The newspaper office in downtown Toccoa
- Type: Weekly newspaper
- Format: Broadsheet
- Editor: Michael O’Hearn
- Founded: 1873
- Language: English
- Headquarters: Toccoa, GA, 30577; United States
- OCLC number: 22045276
- Website: thetoccoarecord.com

The Toccoa Record is a weekly newspaper in Toccoa, Georgia, and Stephens County. It covers Toccoa and Stephens County.

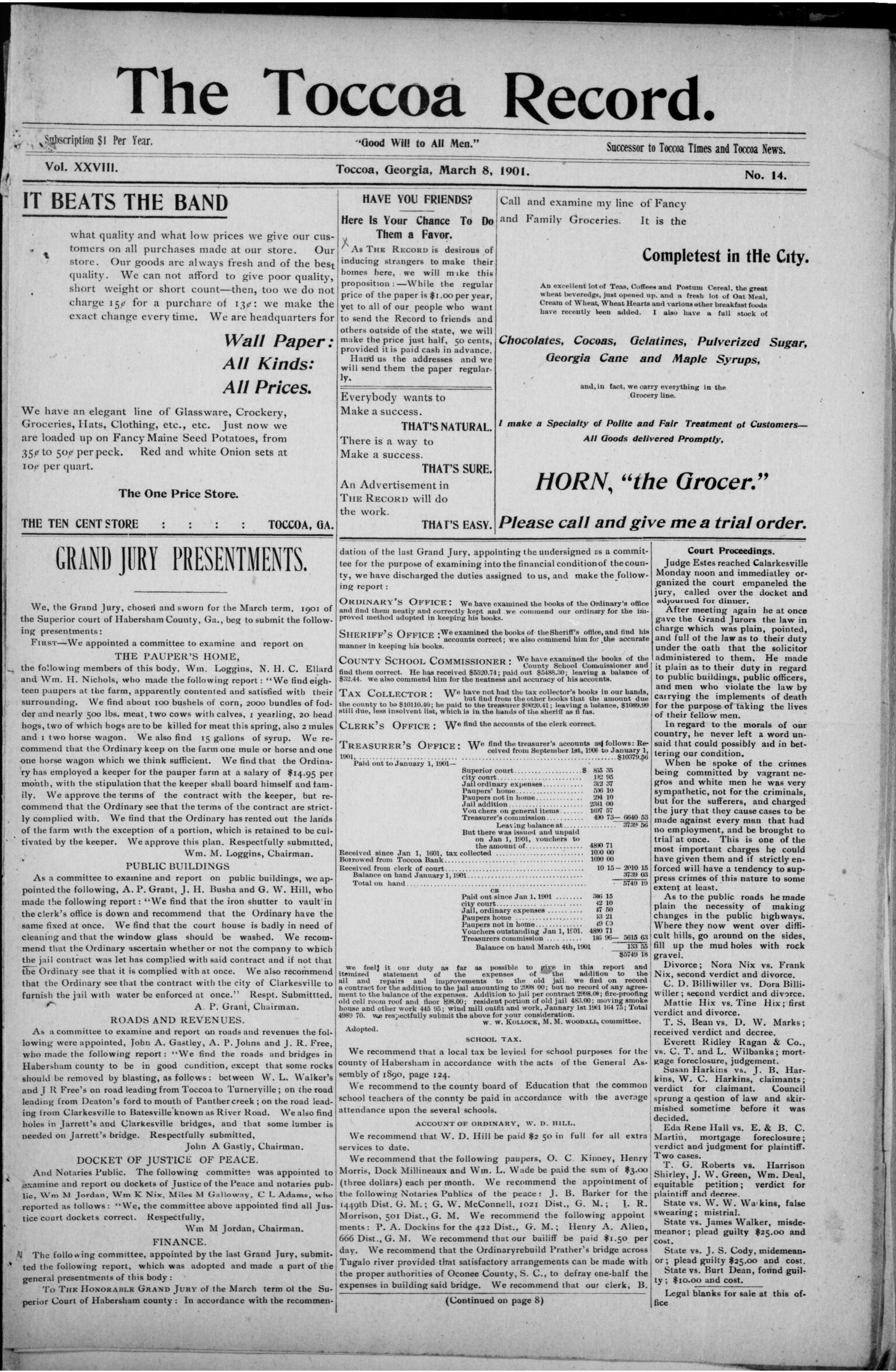
Font page of The Toccoa Record on March 8, 1901

The newspaper is the oldest business in Stephens County. It launched in 1873. Until 1901, the paper was known as The Southern Record and was published by Southern Publishing Company.

In 1995, the newspaper was purchased by Community Newspapers Inc., which is based in Athens, Georgia. That same year it merged with the Stephens County Chieftain.

== See also ==
- List of newspapers in Georgia (U.S. state)
