= Stephens County, Georgia =

County in Georgia, United States

- County
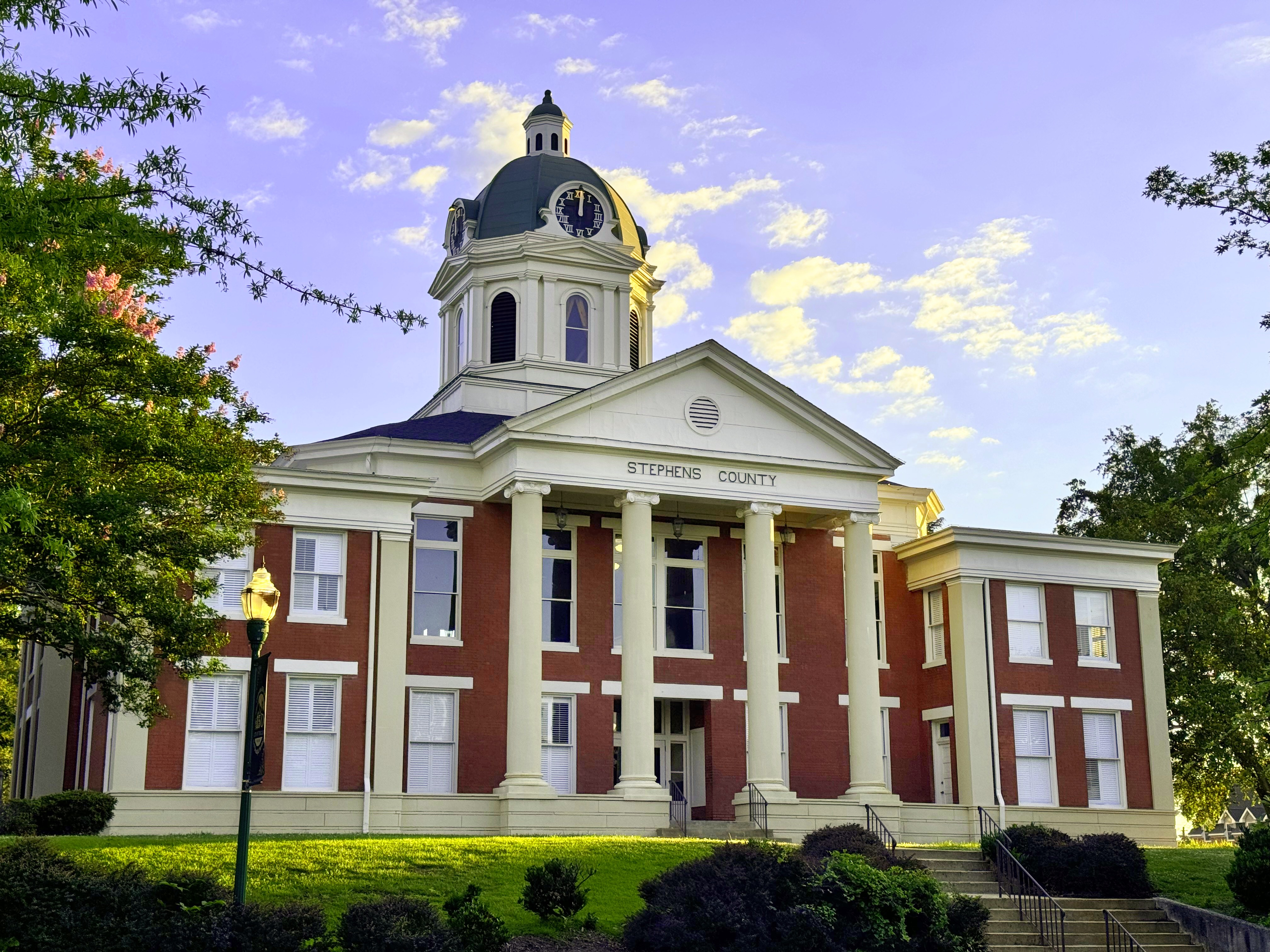
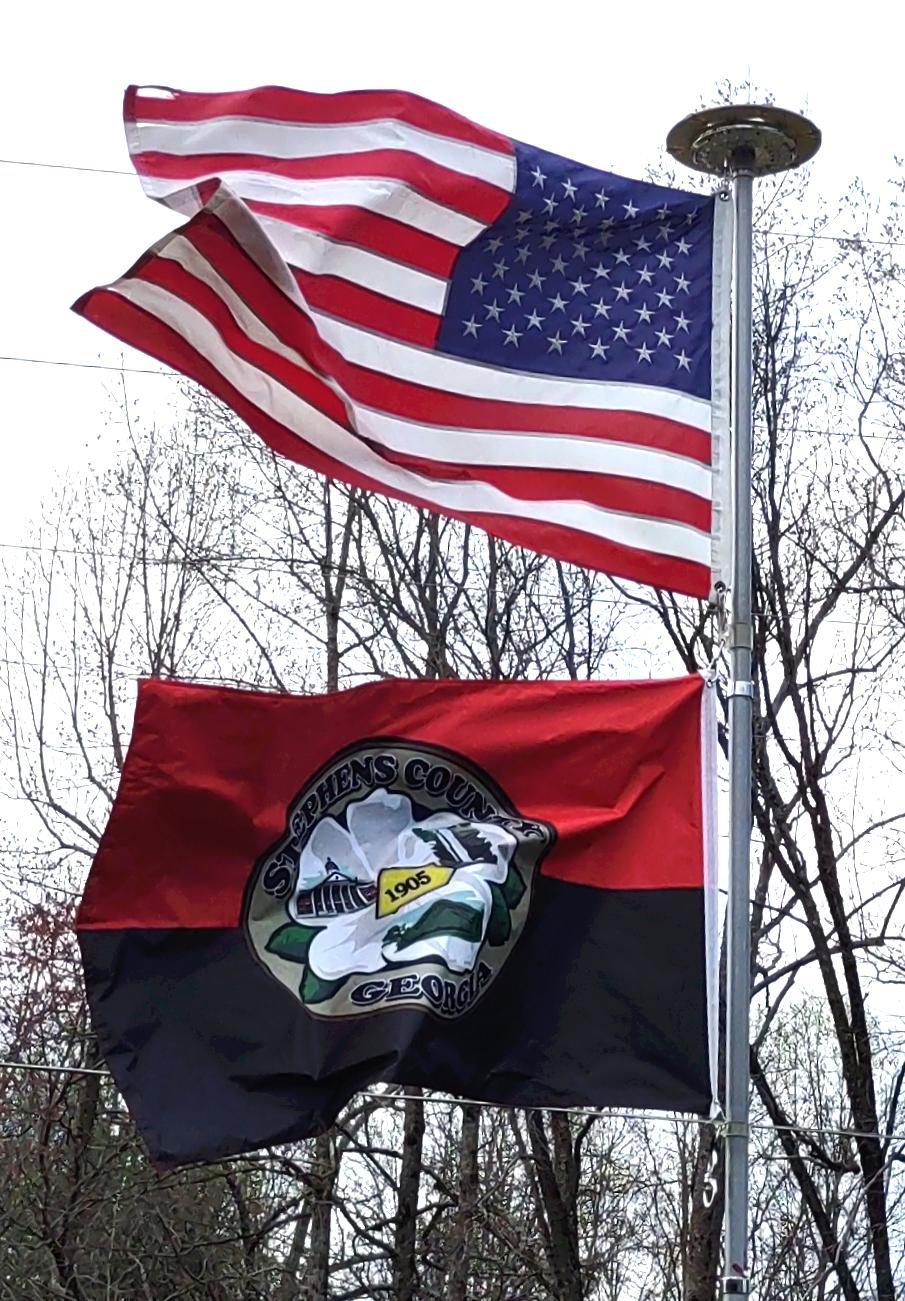
- Stephens County Courthouse in Toccoa Under the USA flag is the Stephens County, GA flag

- Location within the U.S. state of Georgia
- Coordinates: 34°34′N 83°17′W
- Country: United States
- State: Georgia
- Founded: August 18, 1905; 121 years ago
- Named for: Alexander Stephens
- Seat: Toccoa
- Largest city: Toccoa

Area
  - Total: 184 sq mi (480 km^{2})
  - Land: 179 sq mi (460 km^{2})
  - Water: 5.1 sq mi (13 km^{2}) 2.8%

Population (2020)
  - Total: 26,784
  - Estimate (2025): 27,854 ▲
  - Density: 150/sq mi (58/km^{2})
- Time zone: UTC−5 (Eastern)
  - Summer (DST): UTC−4 (EDT)
- Congressional district: 9th
- Website: stephenscountyga.gov

Stephens County is a county in the Northeast region of the U.S. state of Georgia, in the Piedmont and near the foothills of the Blue Ridge Mountains. It is bounded by the Tugaloo River and Lake Hartwell on the east. As of the 2020 census, the population was 26,784. The county seat is Toccoa.

Stephens County comprises the Toccoa, Georgia Micropolitan Statistical Area.

== History ==
The county was long inhabited by indigenous peoples. People of the South Appalachian Mississippian culture developed a village and a platform mound on Tugaloo Island about 800 CE. The village and mound, both known as Tugaloo, were later occupied by other peoples until about 1700. Numerous other villages also developed along the river and its tributaries. Descendants of the Mississippians have been identified as the proto-Creek (Muscogee people). Allied with them in historic times were the Yuchi, who occupied the village known as Tugaloo, where they were replaced by the Cherokee.

While Cherokee began to move into this area from Tennessee under pressure by European Americans during and after the Revolutionary War, the Muscogee Creek continued to dominate the southern part of the county until they ceded their land to the United States in a treaty of 1794.

=== United States era ===
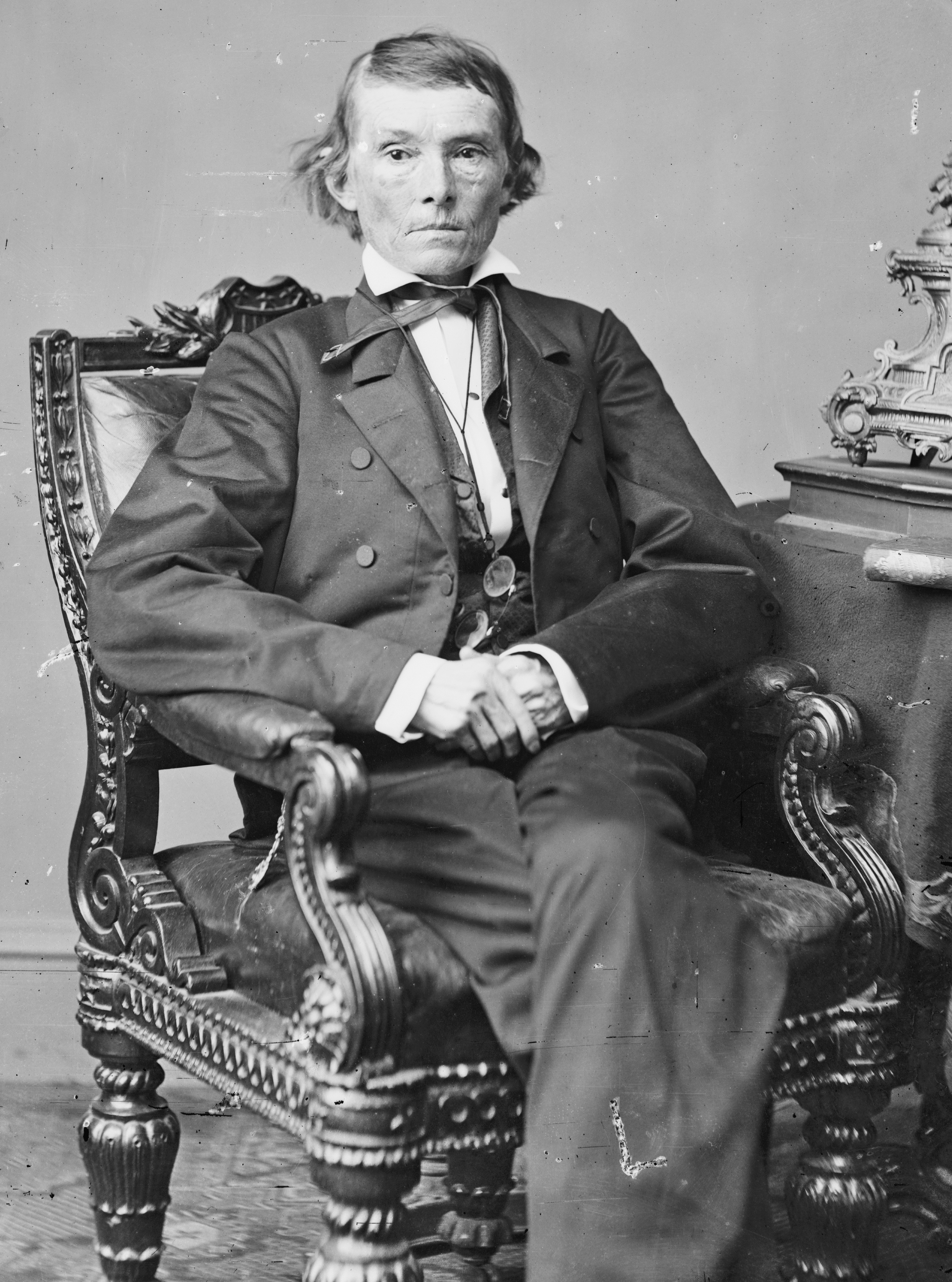
Alexander Stephens, namesake of Stephens County

It was not until after the American Revolutionary War that European Americans began to settle here. The first were veterans who had been given land grants in lieu of pay; they migrated up the Savannah River and the Tugaloo River after the war. During the American Civil War, the Battle of the Narrows was fought in what would become the county.

The county was created on August 18, 1905, from parts of Franklin and Habersham counties, and was named for Alexander Stephens, U.S. representative, Vice President of the Confederate States of America, and fifty-third governor of Georgia.

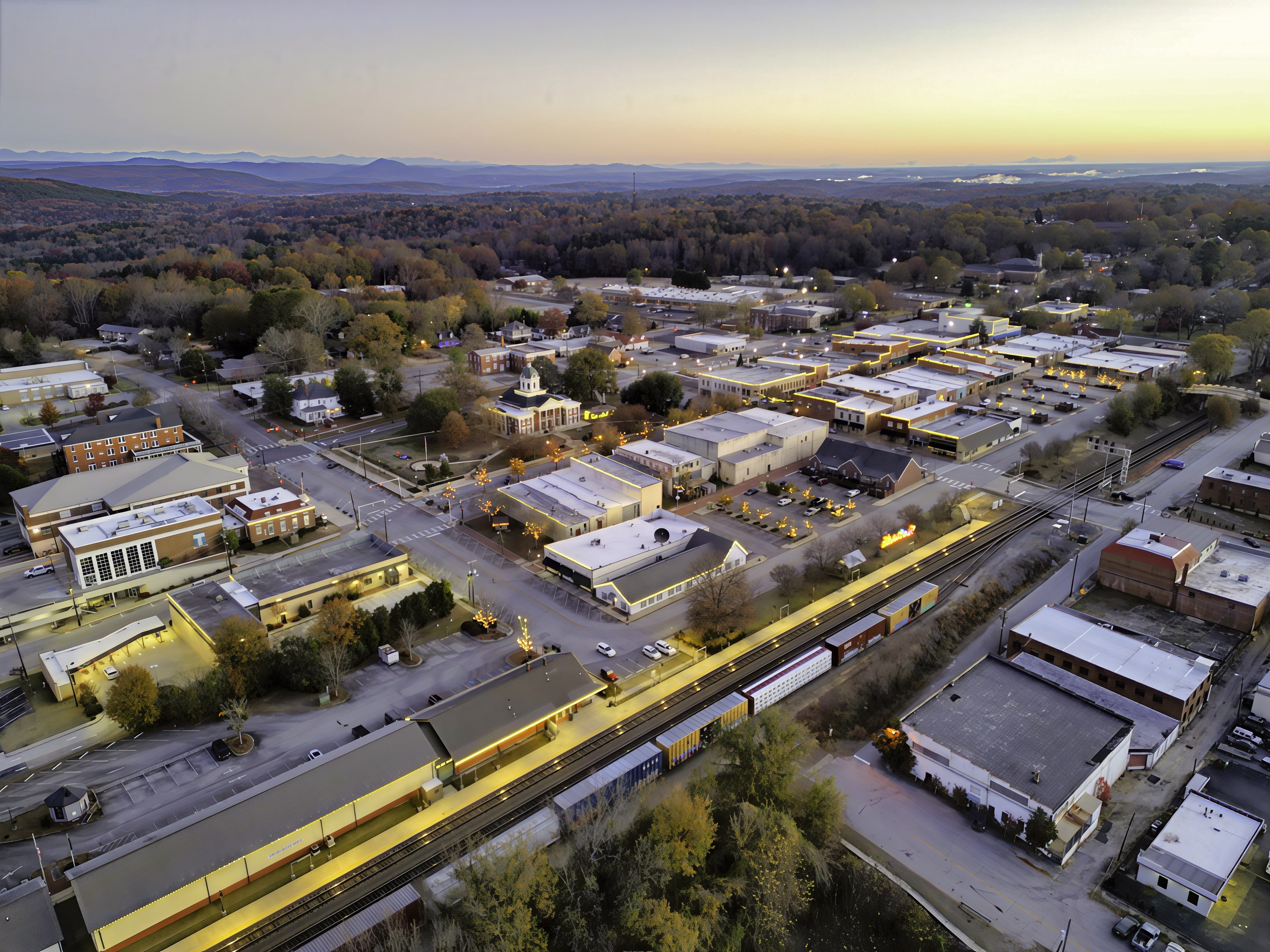
Aerial image of Toccoa

Toccoa was designated as the county seat and was the site of the county's two courthouses. The first courthouse was built in 1907 and is now listed on the National Register of Historic Places. The second was built in 2000. The former courthouse is now used for county elections.

Despite the Great Depression, more industry developed in the county in the 1930s. J&P Coats Company purchased the Capps Cotton Mill in 1937 and operated it for nearly 70 years, before textile manufacturing jobs moved offshore to cheaper labor markets. In 1938, industrialist R.G. LeTourneau opened a manufacturing plant for earth-moving equipment. Later that year, the Toccoa Airport was constructed. During World War II, the LeTourneau plant produced equipment for use by the military, employing 2,000 people in this effort. In addition, the U.S. Army developed Camp Toccoa here, for training paratroopers.

Beginning in 1950, planning began for what was called the Hartwell Project, which envisioned dams on the Savanna and tributary rivers for flood control and hydropower generation. In addition, a large reservoir would be created, known as Lake Hartwell.

Prior to the flooding of this area by Lake Hartwell, produced behind the Hartwell Dam on the Savannah River, archeological studies were conducted in 1958 of known prehistoric and historic sites in the area. Among them, the Tugaloo Mound and village site by a team from the University of Georgia. The mound is still visible above the water, and a historic marker on Highway 123 at the Georgia-South Carolina border helps mark this spot.

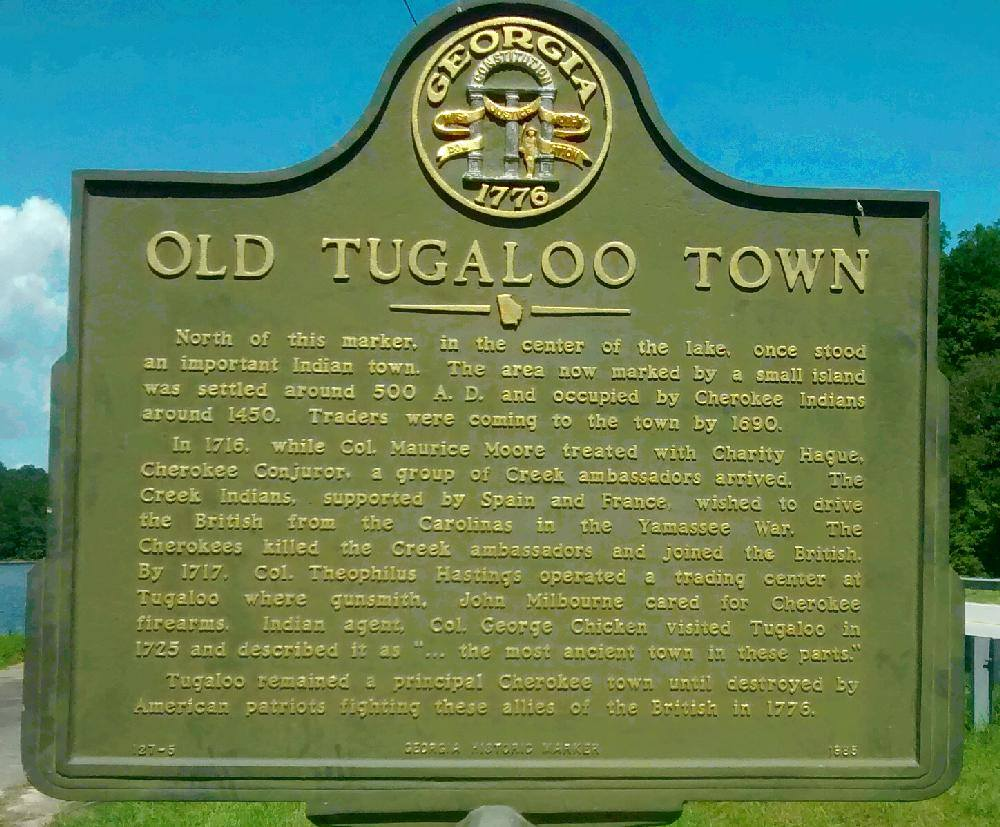
Historic Plaque Tugaloo Town, Georgia, USA

On November 6, 1977, the earthen Kelly Barnes Dam collapsed after a period of heavy rainfall. The resulting flood swept through the campus of Toccoa Falls College, killing 39 people and causing $2.8 million in damage.

== Geography ==
According to the U.S. Census Bureau, the county has a total area of 184 square miles (480 km^{2}), of which 179 square miles (460 km^{2}) is land and 5.1 square miles (13 km^{2}) (2.8%) is water. The county is located mainly within the upper Piedmont region of the state, with western portions of the county having the highest elevations and located in the foothills of the Blue Ridge Mountains.

The northern half of Stephens County is located in the Tugaloo River sub-basin of the Savannah River basin. Lake Hartwell was created as a reservoir on the river after the construction of Hartwell Dam on the Savannah, completed in 1962. The southern half of the county is located in the Broad River sub-basin of the same Savannah River basin.

=== Major highways ===
- U.S. Route 123 / State Route 365
- State Route 17
  - State Route 17 Alternate
- State Route 63
- State Route 105
- State Route 106
- State Route 145
- State Route 184
- State Route 328

=== Adjacent counties ===
- Oconee County, South Carolina (north)
- Franklin County (south)
- Banks County (southwest)
- Habersham County (west)

=== National protected area ===
- Chattahoochee National Forest (part)

== Demographics ==
Historical population
Census	Pop.	Note	%±
1910	9,728		—
1920	11,215		15.3%
1930	11,740		4.7%
1940	12,972		10.5%
1950	16,647		28.3%
1960	18,391		10.5%
1970	20,331		10.5%
1980	21,763		7.0%
1990	23,257		6.9%
2000	25,435		9.4%
2010	26,175		2.9%
2020	26,784		2.3%
2025 (est.)	27,854	▲	4.0%
U.S. Decennial Census; 1790-1880 1890-1910; 1920-1930 1930-1940; 1940-1950 1960-1980; 1980-2000 2010

=== Racial and ethnic composition ===
Stephens County, Georgia – Racial and ethnic composition Note: the US Census treats Hispanic/Latino as an ethnic category. This table excludes Latinos from the racial categories and assigns them to a separate category. Hispanics/Latinos may be of any race.
Race / Ethnicity (NH = Non-Hispanic)	Pop 1980	Pop 1990	Pop 2000	Pop 2010	Pop 2020	% 1980	% 1990	% 2000	% 2010	% 2020
White alone (NH)	18,925	20,208	21,673	22,006	21,323	86.96%	86.89%	85.21%	84.07%	79.61%
Black or African American alone (NH)	2,611	2,768	3,029	2,821	2,936	12.00%	11.90%	11.91%	10.78%	10.96%
Native American or Alaska Native alone (NH)	20	32	62	68	73	0.09%	0.14%	0.24%	0.26%	0.27%
Asian alone (NH)	38	99	145	175	225	0.17%	0.43%	0.57%	0.67%	0.84%
Native Hawaiian or Pacific Islander alone (NH)	x	x	19	13	9	x	x	0.07%	0.05%	0.03%
Other race alone (NH)	0	6	26	32	76	0.00%	0.03%	0.10%	0.12%	0.28%
Mixed race or Multiracial (NH)	x	x	231	427	1,285	x	x	0.91%	1.63%	4.80%
Hispanic or Latino (any race)	169	144	250	633	857	0.78%	0.62%	0.98%	2.42%	3.20%
Total	21,763	23,257	25,435	26,175	26,784	100.00%	100.00%	100.00%	100.00%	100.00%

=== 2020 census ===
As of the 2020 census, there were 26,784 people, 10,618 households, and 6,783 families residing in the county. The median age was 43.7 years; 21.0% of residents were under the age of 18, and 22.0% were 65 years of age or older.

For every 100 females there were 93.5 males, and for every 100 females age 18 and over there were 91.1 males age 18 and over. 44.1% of residents lived in urban areas, while 55.9% lived in rural areas.

The racial makeup of the county was 80.6% White, 11.1% Black or African American, 0.4% American Indian and Alaska Native, 0.9% Asian, 0.0% Native Hawaiian and Pacific Islander, 1.1% from some other race, and 5.9% from two or more races. Hispanic or Latino residents of any race comprised 3.2% of the population.

There were 10,618 households in the county, of which 28.1% had children under the age of 18 living with them and 28.8% had a female householder with no spouse or partner present. About 28.2% of all households were made up of individuals and 13.8% had someone living alone who was 65 years of age or older.

There were 12,317 housing units, of which 13.8% were vacant. Among occupied housing units, 68.1% were owner-occupied and 31.9% were renter-occupied. The homeowner vacancy rate was 1.9% and the rental vacancy rate was 5.4%.

=== 2010 census ===
As of the 2010 United States census, there were 26,175 people, 10,289 households, and 7,236 families residing in the county. The population density was 146.1 inhabitants per square mile (56.4/km^{2}). There were 12,662 housing units at an average density of 70.7 per square mile (27.3/km^{2}). The racial makeup of the county was 85.1% white, 10.9% black or African American, 0.7% Asian, 0.3% American Indian, 0.1% Pacific islander, 1.0% from other races, and 2.0% from two or more races. Those of Hispanic or Latino origin made up 2.4% of the population. In terms of ancestry, 14.7% were American, 9.1% were Irish, 8.1% were German, and 7.4% were English.

Of the 10,289 households, 31.5% had children under the age of 18 living with them, 52.8% were married couples living together, 13.2% had a female householder with no husband present, 29.7% were non-families, and 25.7% of all households were made up of individuals. The average household size was 2.49 and the average family size was 2.96. The median age was 40.7 years.

The median income for a household in the county was $34,938 and the median income for a family was $41,768. Males had a median income of $35,814 versus $24,834 for females. The per capita income for the county was $18,285. About 12.3% of families and 18.8% of the population were below the poverty line, including 25.9% of those under age 18 and 16.0% of those age 65 or over.

== Communities ==
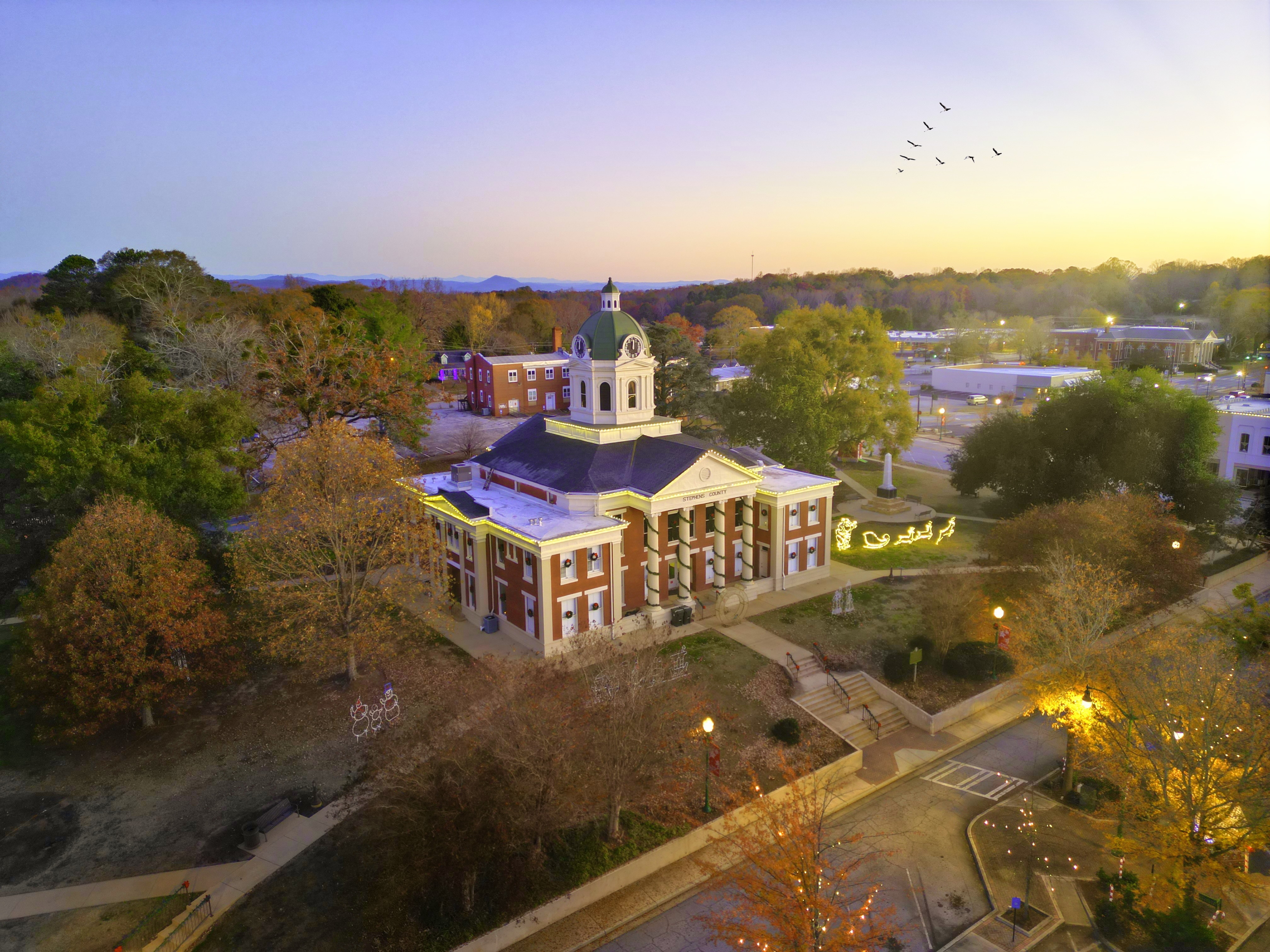
The Stephens County Courthouse in downtown Toccoa

=== City ===
- Toccoa (county seat)

=== Towns ===
- Avalon
- Martin

=== Unincorporated community ===
- Eastanollee

== Politics ==
Stephens County is strongly Republican. The last Democrat to carry the county was Jimmy Carter in 1980.

United States presidential election results for Stephens County, Georgia
Year	Republican		Democratic		Third party(ies)	
Year	No.	%	No.	%	No.	%
1912	14	2.94%	405	85.08%	57	11.97%
1916	15	2.61%	500	86.96%	60	10.43%
1920	252	37.78%	415	62.22%	0	0.00%
1924	40	6.68%	523	87.31%	36	6.01%
1928	270	38.14%	438	61.86%	0	0.00%
1932	18	1.71%	1,026	97.53%	8	0.76%
1936	68	5.61%	1,142	94.22%	2	0.17%
1940	90	7.61%	1,084	91.71%	8	0.68%
1944	212	15.47%	1,158	84.53%	0	0.00%
1948	278	21.01%	912	68.93%	133	10.05%
1952	661	15.74%	3,539	84.26%	0	0.00%
1956	684	20.86%	2,595	79.14%	0	0.00%
1960	815	20.89%	3,087	79.11%	0	0.00%
1964	1,371	28.24%	3,483	71.76%	0	0.00%
1968	1,295	25.23%	1,035	20.17%	2,802	54.60%
1972	3,773	81.24%	871	18.76%	0	0.00%
1976	1,340	19.42%	5,560	80.58%	0	0.00%
1980	2,045	30.56%	4,529	67.68%	118	1.76%
1984	4,057	64.10%	2,272	35.90%	0	0.00%
1988	4,329	66.09%	2,185	33.36%	36	0.55%
1992	4,047	47.65%	2,976	35.04%	1,470	17.31%
1996	3,890	48.77%	3,072	38.51%	1,015	12.72%
2000	5,370	64.11%	2,869	34.25%	137	1.64%
2004	6,904	71.37%	2,714	28.05%	56	0.58%
2008	7,689	72.87%	2,705	25.63%	158	1.50%
2012	7,221	75.74%	2,131	22.35%	182	1.91%
2016	7,686	78.31%	1,837	18.72%	292	2.98%
2020	9,367	78.81%	2,386	20.08%	132	1.11%
2024	10,632	81.17%	2,404	18.35%	63	0.48%

United States Senate election results for Stephens County, Georgia2
Year	Republican		Democratic		Third party(ies)	
Year	No.	%	No.	%	No.	%
2020	9,353	79.48%	2,187	18.58%	228	1.94%
2020	7,979	79.50%	2,058	20.50%	0	0.00%

United States Senate election results for Stephens County, Georgia3
Year	Republican		Democratic		Third party(ies)	
Year	No.	%	No.	%	No.	%
2020	6,652	57.40%	1,144	9.87%	3,792	32.72%
2020	9,368	79.71%	2,385	20.29%	0	0.00%
2022	7,374	79.01%	1,762	18.88%	197	2.11%
2022	6,702	80.13%	1,662	19.87%	0	0.00%

Georgia Gubernatorial election results for Stephens County
Year	Republican		Democratic		Third party(ies)	
Year	No.	%	No.	%	No.	%
2022	7,818	83.17%	1,501	15.97%	81	0.86%

Stephens County is part of Georgia's 9th congressional district for elections to the United States House of Representatives, currently held by Republican Andrew Clyde since 2021.

Stephens County is part of District 32 for elections to the Georgia House of Representatives.

Stephens County is part of District 50 for elections to the Georgia State Senate.

== Infrastructure ==
=== Transportation ===
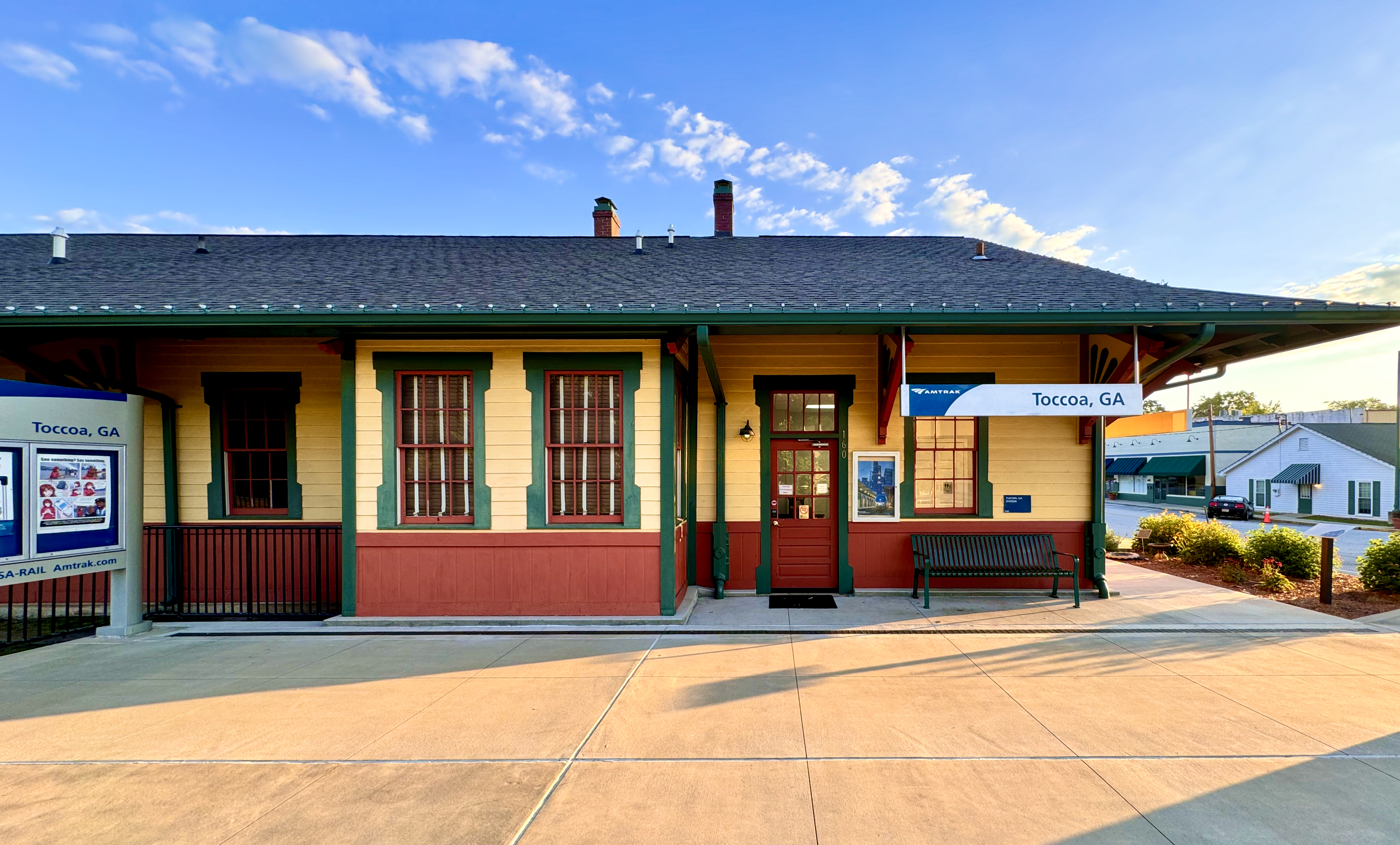
Toccoa Amtrak Station

The Amtrak Crescent connects Toccoa to New York, Philadelphia, Baltimore, Washington, Charlotte, Atlanta, Birmingham, and New Orleans. The Amtrak station is located at 47 North Alexander Street. The rail line is shared with the Norfolk Southern Railway. Toccoa was formerly a stop on the Airline Belle, which was a Southern Railway regional train between 1879 and 1931.

Toccoa Airport is a small executive airport northeast of the town. The airport is sometimes referred to as R.G. LeTourneau Field as it was built by R.G. LeTourneau.

== Media ==
The Toccoa Record newspaper started in 1873.

WNEG (AM) and 93.1 FM is a radio station broadcasting from Toccoa. It went on the air in 1956.

== Education ==
Public education is provided by the Stephens County School District.

== See also ==
- National Register of Historic Places listings in Stephens County, Georgia
- North Georgia Technical College
- Toccoa Falls College
- List of counties in Georgia
