= Martin, Georgia =

- Town
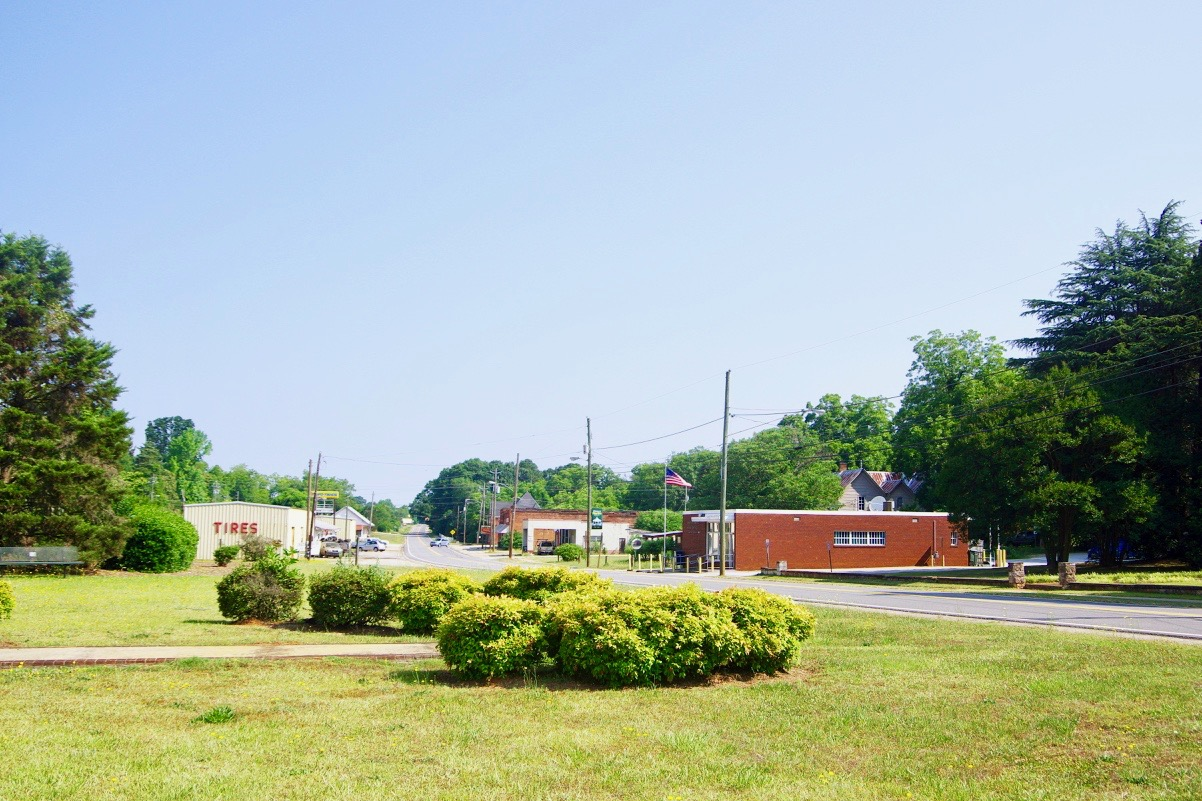
- Main Street

- Location in Stephens County and the state of Georgia
- Coordinates: 34°29′12″N 83°11′8″W
- Country: United States
- State: Georgia
- Counties: Stephens, Franklin

Area
  - Total: 2.53 sq mi (6.56 km^{2})
  - Land: 2.51 sq mi (6.50 km^{2})
  - Water: 0.023 sq mi (0.06 km^{2})
- Elevation: 920 ft (280 m)

Population (2020)
  - Total: 336
  - Density: 133.8/sq mi (51.67/km^{2})
- Time zone: UTC-5 (Eastern (EST))
  - Summer (DST): UTC-4 (EDT)
- ZIP code: 30557
- Area code: 706
- FIPS code: 13-50008
- GNIS feature ID: 0317732
- Website: http://www.townofmartin.com

Martin is a town in Stephens and Franklin counties in the U.S. state of Georgia. As of the 2020 census, Martin had a population of 336.

== History ==
Martin was incorporated in 1891. Its first settler, Henry C. Black, was the Air Line Railroad agent at its station (set up in 1877) at the junction of Red Hollow Road and the railroad. Henry Black built houses and established stores around the junction, which attracted other settlers. The Red Hollow Road was an important conduit for farm products from the mountain areas to Augusta and Savannah. The town was named for John Martin, a Rhode Island man who became governor of Georgia in 1782.

== Geography ==
Martin is located in southeastern Stephens County at 34°29′12″N 83°11′8″W (34.486662, -83.185656) A small portion extends south into Franklin County. It is bordered to the north by the town of Avalon. Georgia State Route 17 passes through Martin, leading northwest 11 miles (18 km) to Toccoa and southeast 6 miles (10 km) to Lavonia.

According to the United States Census Bureau, the town of Martin has a total area of 2.5 square miles (6.6 km^{2}), of which 0.02 square miles (0.06 km^{2}), or 0.85%, is water.

== Demographics ==
Historical population
| Census | Pop. | Note | %± |
|---|---|---|---|
| 1900 | 160 | | — |
| 1910 | 377 | | 135.6% |
| 1920 | 344 | | −8.8% |
| 1930 | 463 | | 34.6% |
| 1940 | 242 | | −47.7% |
| 1950 | 207 | | −14.5% |
| 1960 | 209 | | 1.0% |
| 1970 | 201 | | −3.8% |
| 1980 | 305 | | 51.7% |
| 1990 | 243 | | −20.3% |
| 2000 | 311 | | 28.0% |
| 2010 | 381 | | 22.5% |
| 2020 | 336 | | −11.8% |
| 2022 (est.) | 340 | ▲ | 1.2% |
U.S. Decennial Census

As of the census of 2000, there were 311 people, 127 households, and 84 families residing in the town. The population density was 207.8 inhabitants per square mile (80.2/km^{2}). There were 153 housing units at an average density of 102.2 per square mile (39.5/km^{2}). The racial makeup of the town was 72.03% White, 26.37% African American, 0.96% Asian, 0.32% from other races, and 0.32% from two or more races. Hispanic or Latino of any race were 0.64% of the population.

There were 127 households, out of which 30.7% had children under the age of 18 living with them, 54.3% were married couples living together, 10.2% had a female householder with no husband present, and 33.1% were non-families. 28.3% of all households were made up of individuals, and 13.4% had someone living alone who was 65 years of age or older. The average household size was 2.45 and the average family size was 3.05.

In the town, the population was spread out, with 25.7% under the age of 18, 9.3% from 18 to 24, 26.4% from 25 to 44, 26.0% from 45 to 64, and 12.5% who were 65 years of age or older. The median age was 38 years. For every 100 females, there were 98.1 males. For every 100 females age 18 and over, there were 86.3 males.

The median income for a household in the town was $29,000, and the median income for a family was $43,750. Males had a median income of $31,333 versus $19,191 for females. The per capita income for the town was $15,009. About 3.4% of families and 10.6% of the population were below the poverty line, including 6.0% of those under age 18 and 41.9% of those age 65 or over.

== Economy ==
As of September 2011, the town of Martin has a few Main Street business. Martin Tire is an example, an automotive repair shop. During the summer of 2011 an ice cream shop was opened up with a moving water wheel decoration. There is also an antique shop and a small plant nursery that is open seasonally. Shops tend to come and go at the mercy of consumers being that Martin is such a small town.

A ballfield is also fenced in beside the fire department and is in a spot that can be used for any correlation to games such as baseball, softball, or kickball. It is lesser known among the many parks of Georgia.

Martin is the location of Shepherd's Hill Academy, a private therapeutic boarding school.

== Events ==
Martin has an annual "Fall Festival". The festival is located in the main street of town, running approximately one quarter mile and occurs on the last Saturday of October of each year. The festival generally includes a live band, food vendors, local handmade crafts, and commercially made items.

== Notable people ==
U.S. Congressman Phillip M. Landrum was from Martin.
