= Toccoa, Georgia =

- City
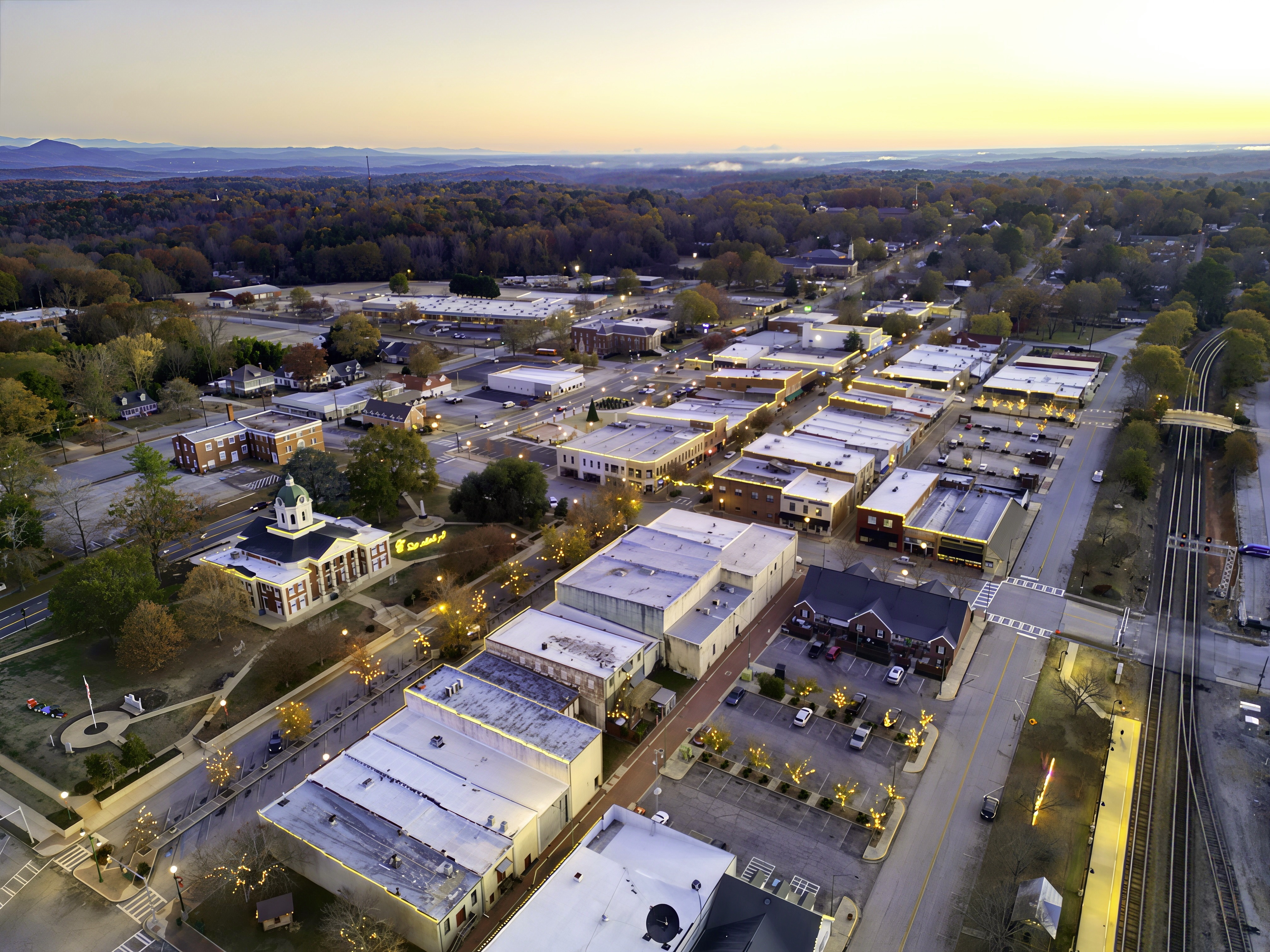
- Aerial view of Toccoa

- Logo
- Nickname: Toccoa the Beautiful
- Motto: "The Heart of Northeast Georgia"
- Location in Stephens County and the state of Georgia
- Coordinates: 34°34′29″N 83°19′12″W
- Country: United States
- State: Georgia
- County: Stephens

Government
  - Mayor: Gail Fry

Area
  - Total: 9.23 sq mi (23.90 km^{2})
  - Land: 9.16 sq mi (23.72 km^{2})
  - Water: 0.066 sq mi (0.17 km^{2})
- Elevation: 994 ft (303 m)

Population (2020)
  - Total: 9,133
  - Density: 997.1/sq mi (384.97/km^{2})
- Time zone: UTC−5 (Eastern (EST))
  - Summer (DST): UTC−4 (EDT)
- ZIP code: 30577
- Area code: 706
- FIPS code: 13-76756
- GNIS feature ID: 0333240
- Website: cityoftoccoa.com

Toccoa is a city in and the county seat of Stephens County, Georgia, United States. It lies in the state's far northeast near the border with South Carolina, about 50 miles (80 km) from Athens and about 90 miles (140 km) northeast of Atlanta. The population was 9,133 as of the 2020 census.

== History ==
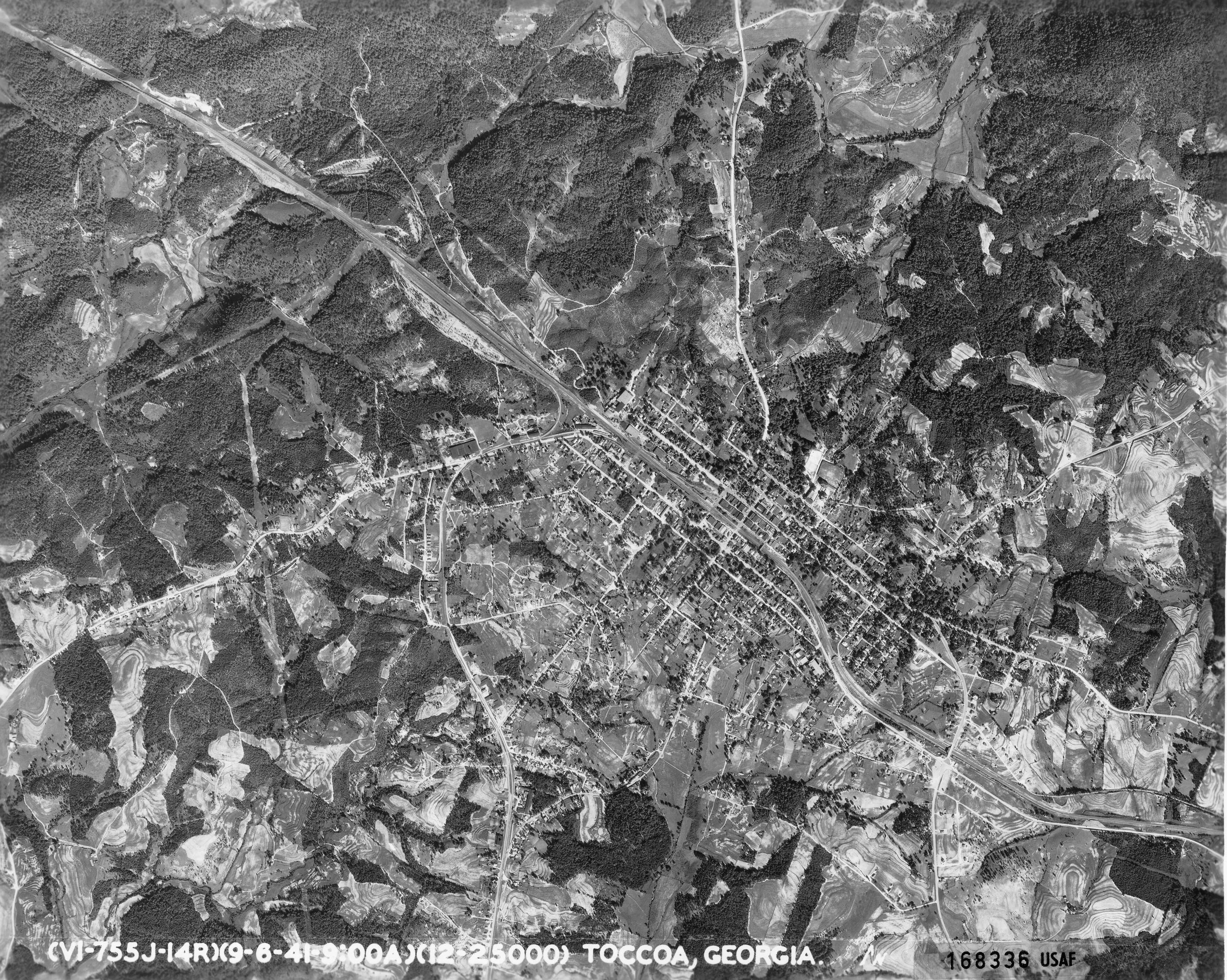
Toccoa, 1941

Mississippian and Yuchi Indians, linked to the Muscogee Creek confederacy and later allies of the Cherokee, occupied Tugaloo and the area of Toccoa for over 1,000 years prior to colonization.

Salvage archeological studies were conducted by Dr. Joseph Caldwell of the University of Georgia in 1957, prior to flooding of this area after construction of a dam downriver. He determined the first settlement existed from about 800 to 1700, when the village was burned. By that time, it was occupied by proto-Creek who were descendants of the Mississippians. Colonial maps until the American Revolution identified this village as one of the Hogeloge people, now known as Yuchi. While they later became allies of the Cherokee, they were of a different ethnicity and language group.

=== Colonial period ===
"Saturday the 25th day of September 1725. About four of the Clock in the Afternoon came in the War hoop from Ouconey with a piece of a Scalp of one of the Enemies Scouts, giving an Accot that Scouts being in Number Twenty four that went out from old Estotoe, and Toxsoah having come upon the tracts of three of the Enemy found they were made downwards towards the other Towns (on wch) they Concluded to waylay the Path thinking by that means to Catch the Enemy being three in Number returning back to their old tracts near Estotoe from Town to Town."

— George Chicken, Journal (quoted in Travels in the American Colonies)

Indian agent Col. George Chicken was one of the first English colonists to mention Toccoa in his journal from 1725, calling it Toxsoah.

As early as 1740, the Unicoi Turnpike, an important Native American trading path, connected Tennessee to Savannah by way of Toccoa. The route began on the Savannah River, just below the entrance of Toccoa Creek. In 1830, it was converted to a toll road.

=== United States era ===
Americans first settled Toccoa after the American Revolutionary War, when the government gave land grants in lieu of pay owed to veterans. A group led by Col. William H. Wofford moved to the area when the war ended. It became known as Wofford's Tract, or Wofford's Settlement. Col. Wofford is buried near Toccoa Falls. His son, William T. Wofford, was born near Toccoa, then part of Habersham County. Travelers had to rely on using fords, and later ferries, to cross the Tugaloo River. James Jeremiah Prather built the swinging Prather's Bridge in 1804, but it was washed away during a freshet, an overflow caused by heavy rain.

Georgia conducted a Land Lottery of 1820, although the Cherokee had not yet ceded this area to the United States. Scots-Irish who acquired land in the lottery moved to this area from the backcountry of North Carolina and the Georgia coast. The Georgia Gold Rush, starting in 1828, also attracted many new settlers to North Georgia.

Americans pressed the government to take over the land of the Five Civilized Tribes, seeking cheaper land to develop for cotton plantations. Short-staple cotton, which could be grown in the uplands through this area, had become profitable since the invention of the cotton gin for processing it. At the urging of President Andrew Jackson, Congress passed the Indian Removal Act of 1830, authorizing the government to force cessions of land by Southeast tribes in exchange for lands west of the Mississippi River, in what became known as Indian Territory, now Oklahoma. The 1838 removal of the Cherokee on the infamous "Trail of Tears" extinguished most of their land claims to this area. The US government released former Cherokee and Creek (Muscogee) lands for sale and American settlement.

A more substantial bridge was built across the Tugaloo River in 1850. That year James D. Prather supervised the construction of his plantation house known as Riverside, on a hill overlooking the upper Tugalo River. The Greek revival antebellum house was built by his African-American slaves, and the timber for the house was harvested from his plantation. The Prather family cemetery was developed to the right of the house.

During the Civil War, General Robert Toombs, a close friend of Prather, used this house as a refuge from Union troops. The soldiers pursued him to Riverside, but he hid and escaped capture.

The Prather Bridge was burned in 1863 by Confederate troops during the Civil War to keep the Union enemy from crossing. James Jeremiah Prather and his son, James Devereaux Prather, rebuilt the bridge in 1868. This bridge lasted until 1918, when it was washed away. It was rebuilt in 1920 by James D. Prather. It was afterward replaced by a concrete bridge, but the wooden bridge was kept as a landmark. Vandals burned it down in 1978.

According to historical accounts, the Johns House, a Victorian cottage near Prather Bridge Road, was built in 1898. When the Georgia General Assembly created Stephens County in 1905, Toccoa was established as the county seat.

President Franklin Delano Roosevelt visited Toccoa on March 23, 1938, during the Great Depression. Roosevelt's train made a brief stop there, and he made remarks from the rear platform of the presidential train. He traveled to Gainesville to deliver a major speech, and finished at Warm Springs for a vacation.

Camp Toccoa was developed nearby as a World War II paratrooper training base. It was the first training base for the 506th Parachute Infantry Regiment of the Army's 101st Airborne Division. Its Easy Company was subject of the non-fiction book and an HBO miniseries adaptation of the same name: Band of Brothers.

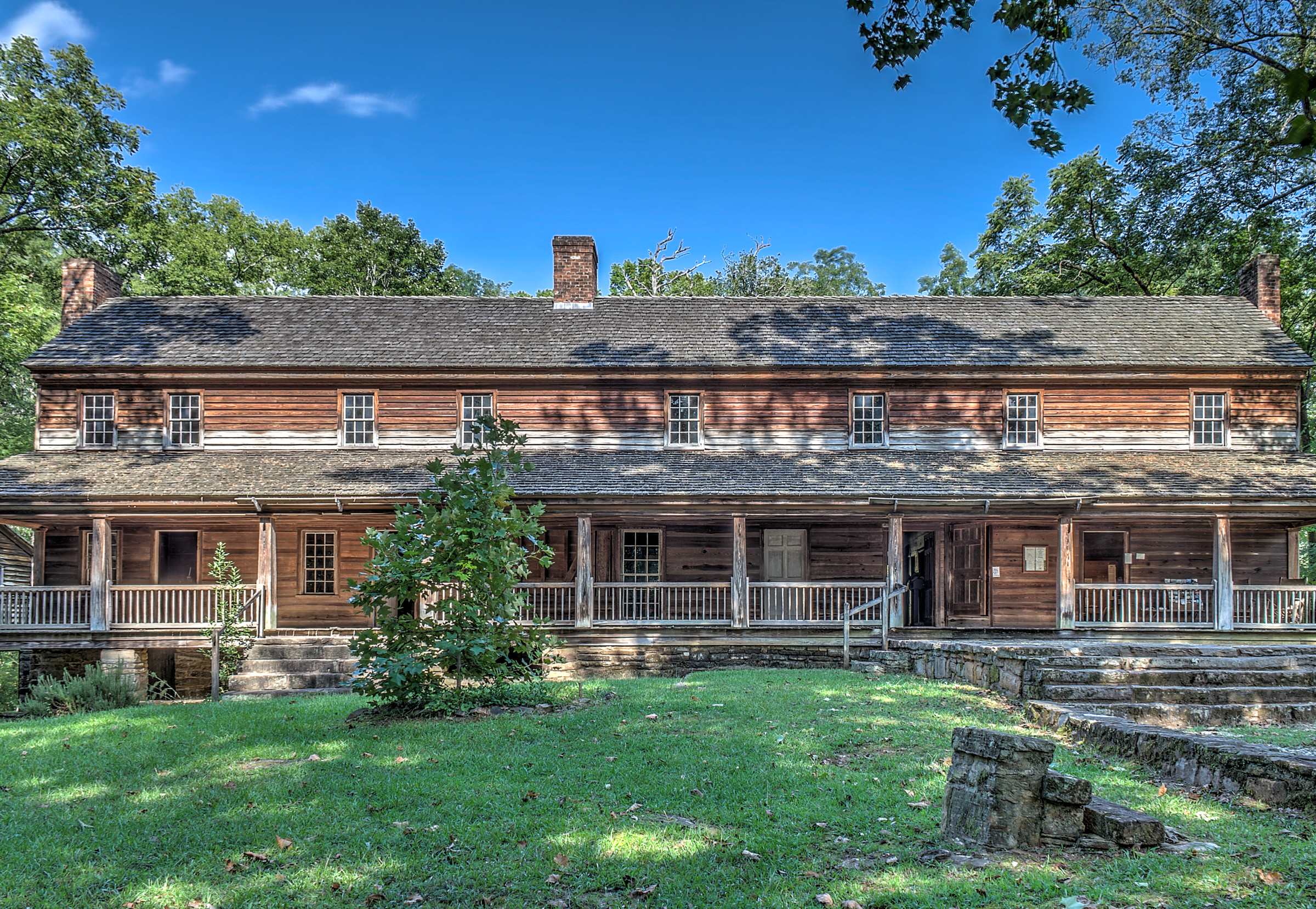
Traveler's Rest

Traveler's Rest, an antebellum 19th-century inn, known locally as Jarrett Manor, is located outside Toccoa. It stands near Lake Hartwell, which was created by flooding an area of the Tugaloo River after completion of the Hartwell Dam in 1962. The inn has been designated as a National Historic Landmark.

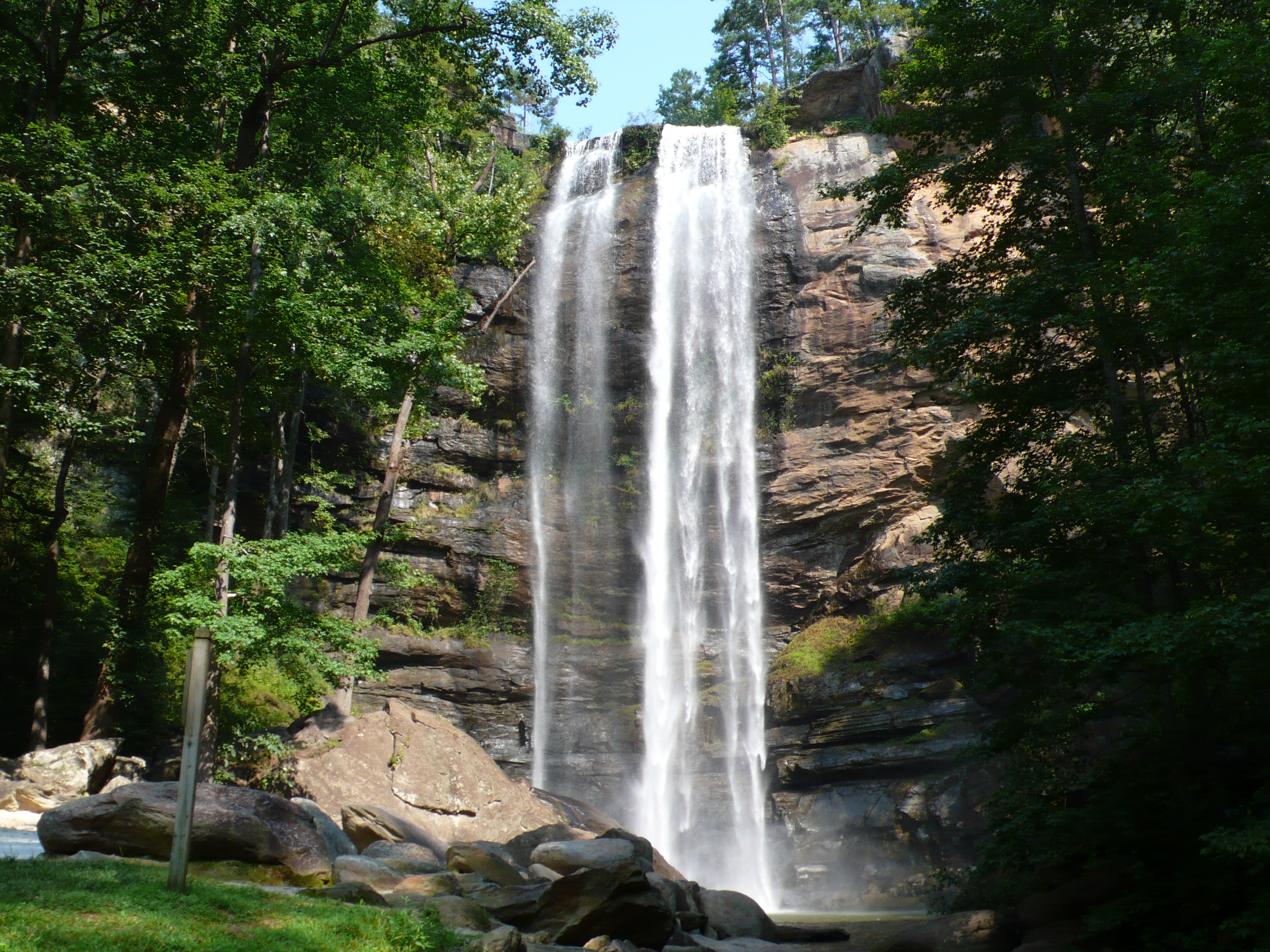
Toccoa Falls

Toccoa Falls is located on the campus of Toccoa Falls College. The short 100-yard path to the base of the 186-foot (57 m) high natural waterfall is gravel-paved and easily walkable.

== Geography and climate ==
Toccoa is located at 34°34′29″N 83°19′12″W (34.574725, −83.319865).

According to the United States Census Bureau, the city has a total area of 8.4 square miles (22 km^{2}), of which 8.3 square miles (21 km^{2}) is land and 0.1 square miles (0.26 km^{2}) (0.60%) is water.

Altitude is 313 m (1,027 ft).

Toccoa has a humid subtropical climate similar to much of the rest of the state of Georgia.

Climate data for Toccoa, Georgia, 1991–2020 normals, extremes 1891–present
Month	Jan	Feb	Mar	Apr	May	Jun	Jul	Aug	Sep	Oct	Nov	Dec	Year
Record high °F (°C)	82 (28)	83 (28)	93 (34)	95 (35)	99 (37)	104 (40)	107 (42)	104 (40)	104 (40)	99 (37)	89 (32)	80 (27)	107 (42)
Mean maximum °F (°C)	70.0 (21.1)	73.1 (22.8)	81.0 (27.2)	86.2 (30.1)	89.4 (31.9)	94.2 (34.6)	96.1 (35.6)	95.3 (35.2)	92.5 (33.6)	85.9 (29.9)	78.7 (25.9)	71.1 (21.7)	97.1 (36.2)
Mean daily maximum °F (°C)	52.7 (11.5)	56.5 (13.6)	64.2 (17.9)	72.9 (22.7)	79.8 (26.6)	86.2 (30.1)	89.3 (31.8)	88.0 (31.1)	83.1 (28.4)	73.7 (23.2)	63.7 (17.6)	55.4 (13.0)	72.1 (22.3)
Daily mean °F (°C)	42.9 (6.1)	46.0 (7.8)	52.8 (11.6)	60.8 (16.0)	68.7 (20.4)	76.0 (24.4)	79.2 (26.2)	78.2 (25.7)	73.0 (22.8)	62.6 (17.0)	52.3 (11.3)	45.5 (7.5)	61.5 (16.4)
Mean daily minimum °F (°C)	33.1 (0.6)	35.5 (1.9)	41.4 (5.2)	48.8 (9.3)	57.6 (14.2)	65.7 (18.7)	69.1 (20.6)	68.4 (20.2)	62.9 (17.2)	51.4 (10.8)	40.9 (4.9)	35.6 (2.0)	50.9 (10.5)
Mean minimum °F (°C)	16.6 (−8.6)	20.4 (−6.4)	26.8 (−2.9)	35.8 (2.1)	43.8 (6.6)	57.8 (14.3)	62.8 (17.1)	63.5 (17.5)	52.3 (11.3)	37.4 (3.0)	27.7 (−2.4)	23.6 (−4.7)	14.2 (−9.9)
Record low °F (°C)	−5 (−21)	−1 (−18)	9 (−13)	25 (−4)	33 (1)	39 (4)	51 (11)	50 (10)	34 (1)	25 (−4)	9 (−13)	1 (−17)	−5 (−21)
Average precipitation inches (mm)	5.52 (140)	5.01 (127)	5.37 (136)	4.64 (118)	4.07 (103)	5.05 (128)	4.17 (106)	5.70 (145)	4.56 (116)	4.81 (122)	4.38 (111)	5.76 (146)	59.04 (1,498)
Average snowfall inches (cm)	0.5 (1.3)	0.4 (1.0)	0.0 (0.0)	0.0 (0.0)	0.0 (0.0)	0.0 (0.0)	0.0 (0.0)	0.0 (0.0)	0.0 (0.0)	0.0 (0.0)	0.0 (0.0)	0.5 (1.3)	1.4 (3.6)
Average precipitation days (≥ 0.01 in)	10.8	10.5	10.9	10.1	10.0	11.8	11.9	11.4	8.4	7.9	8.8	11.0	123.5
Average snowy days (≥ 0.1 in)	0.2	0.2	0.1	0.0	0.0	0.0	0.0	0.0	0.0	0.0	0.0	0.2	0.7
Source 1: NOAA
Source 2: National Weather Service

== Demographics ==
Historical population
Census	Pop.	Note	%±
1880	679		—
1890	1,120		64.9%
1900	2,176		94.3%
1910	3,120		43.4%
1920	3,567		14.3%
1930	4,602		29.0%
1940	5,494		19.4%
1950	6,781		23.4%
1960	7,303		7.7%
1970	6,971		−4.5%
1980	8,869		27.2%
1990	8,266		−6.8%
2000	9,323		12.8%
2010	8,491		−8.9%
2020	9,133		7.6%
2022 (est.)	9,146		0.1%
U.S. Decennial Census

=== 2020 census ===
As of the 2020 census, Toccoa had a population of 9,133 and included 2,135 families. The median age was 41.4 years. 23.2% of residents were under the age of 18 and 22.1% of residents were 65 years of age or older. For every 100 females there were 83.3 males, and for every 100 females age 18 and over there were 78.9 males age 18 and over.

98.9% of residents lived in urban areas, while 1.1% lived in rural areas.

Of the 3,800 households in Toccoa, 29.1% had children under the age of 18 living in them. Of all households, 35.4% were married-couple households, 18.4% were households with a male householder and no spouse or partner present, and 39.3% were households with a female householder and no spouse or partner present. About 33.9% of all households were made up of individuals and 15.9% had someone living alone who was 65 years of age or older.

There were 4,182 housing units, of which 9.1% were vacant. The homeowner vacancy rate was 2.3% and the rental vacancy rate was 5.4%.

Racial composition as of the 2020 census
Race	Number	Percent
White	6,425	70.3%
Black or African American	1,864	20.4%
American Indian and Alaska Native	40	0.4%
Asian	94	1.0%
Native Hawaiian and Other Pacific Islander	3	0.0%
Some other race	106	1.2%
Two or more races	601	6.6%
Hispanic or Latino (of any race)	334	3.7%

=== 2010 census ===
As of the census of 2010, Toccoa had a population of 8,491.

=== Demographic estimates ===
The July 2014 population estimate was 8,257. The median age of a Toccoa resident was 35.4. The number of companies in Toccoa was 1,135. In educational attainment, high school graduate or higher percentage was 84.1%. The total housing units in Toccoa was 4,009. The median household income was $34,047. The foreign-born population was 213. The percentage of individuals below the poverty level was 24.4%.

== Economy ==
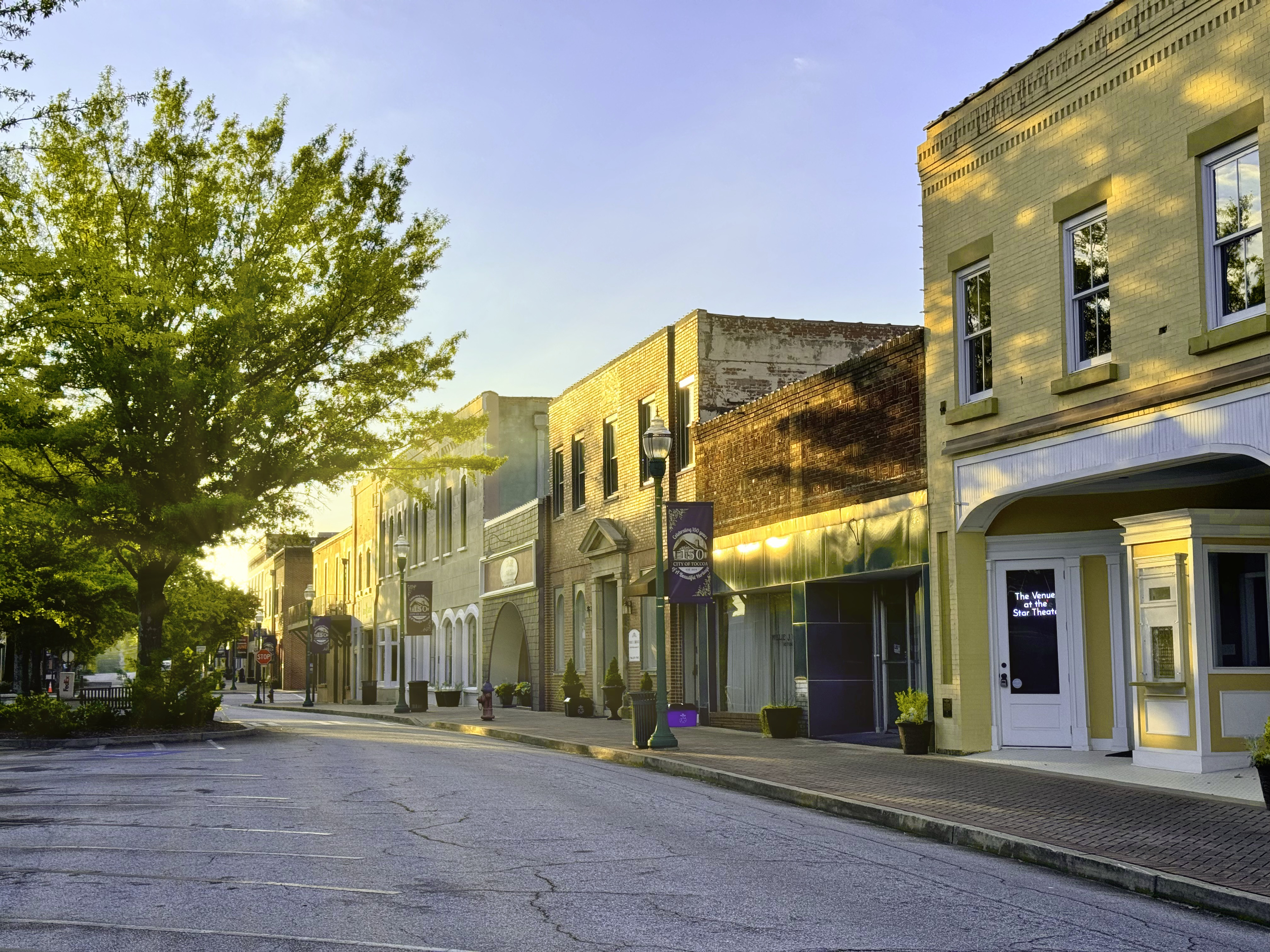
Shops in downtown Toccoa

Stephens County Development Authority (SCDA) was established in 1965 to continue and sustain the growth of Northeast Georgia. SCDA is responsible for the recruitment of new businesses such as industrial, manufacturing, distribution, corporate and regional headquarters and customer service centers. SCDA serves the following cities: Toccoa, Eastanollee, Martin, and Avalon. Major industrial parks in the area are Toccoa Industrial Park, Meadowbrook Industrial Park, and Hayestone Brady Business Park.

The top Stephens County employers in descending order are the Stephens County School System, Caterpillar, Patterson Pump, ASI (GEM Industries), American Woodmark Corp., Standard Register, Sage Automotive Interiors, Habersham Plantation, Toccoa Falls College, Coats & Clark, Eaton Corporation, and PTL Company (an elevator fixtures and parts manufacturer). Founded and headquartered in Toccoa, 1st Franklin Financial Corporation is a regional financial services company with more than 1,300 employees.

== Arts and culture ==
=== Annual events ===
Annual events include the Currahee Military Weekend, the Ida Cox Music Series, Toast of Toccoa, Summer Movies at the Ritz, Costume Parade, Harvest Festival, ChristmasFest, and Christmas Parade.

=== Music ===
Toccoa is the home to a regional volunteer orchestra, the Toccoa Symphony Orchestra, which exists to provide quality symphonic music to the region and to bring together musicians from throughout northeast Georgia and southern South Carolina. The symphony was founded in 1977 by music educators Pinkie Craft Ware and Archie Sharretts. The symphony performs at least three concerts every season. It is supported by a board of directors and an extensive network of patrons. The orchestra collaborates with many musicians and provides a wide range of concert experiences. The ensemble has premiered works by young composers, presents a yearly Christmas concert with a hundred-voice choir, and incorporates budding performers from nearby Toccoa Falls College.

The rock band Luxury originated in Toccoa, at Toccoa Falls College, in the early 1990s.

=== Currahee Military Museum ===
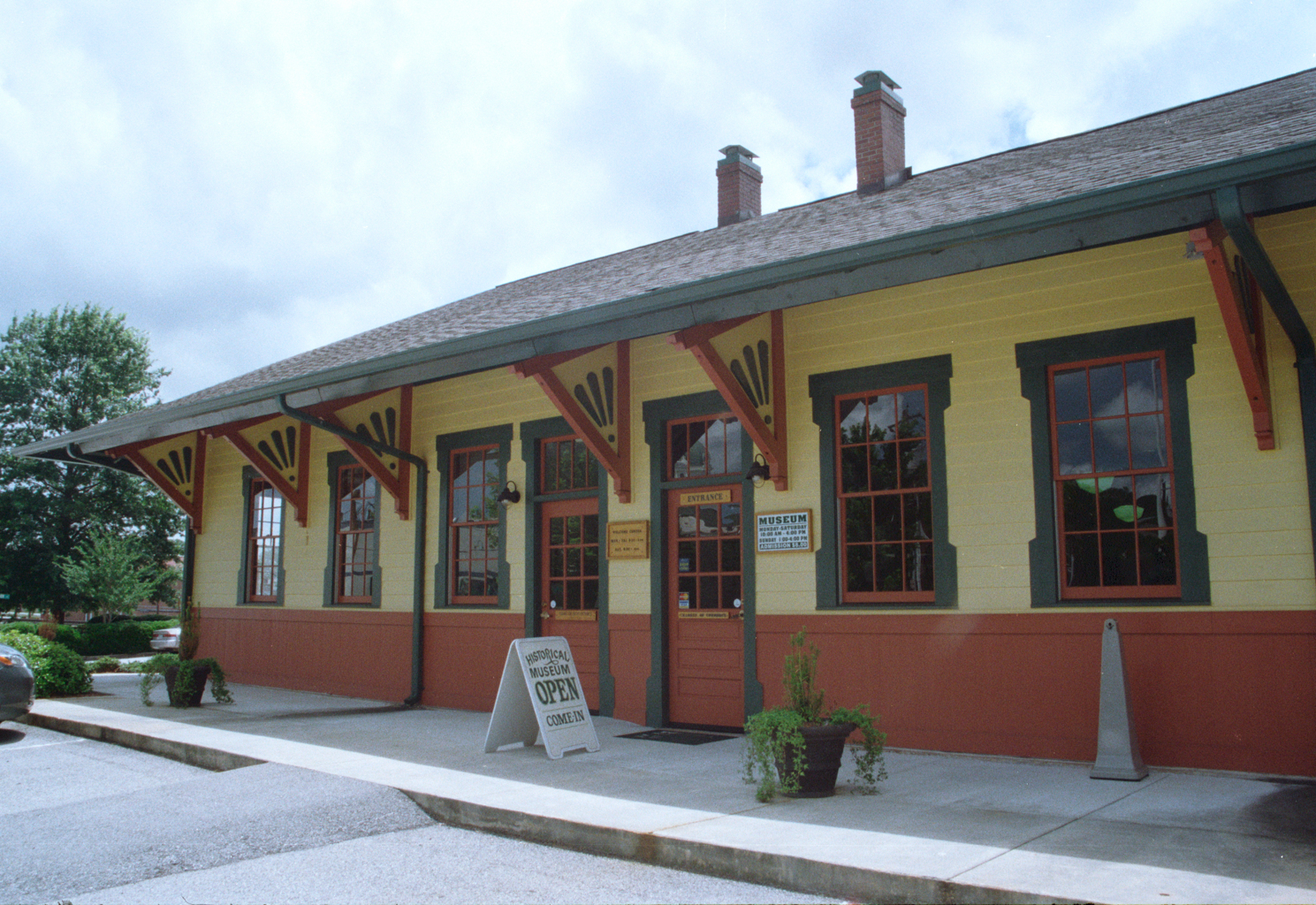
Currahee Military Museum

The Currahee Military Museum, located in downtown Toccoa at the train station where arriving GIs disembarks, is dedicated to the paratroopers of World War II who trained at Camp Toccoa. Camp Toccoa, founded as Camp Toombs, was located just outside the city, at the foot of Currahee Mountain. The museum holds the Aldbourne stables where paratroopers of the 101st Airborne Division were housed in England in 1944.

Only one building remains of the original Camp Toccoa. The building is believed to be a former food supply storage facility, based on its position near the former camp's gates and the foundation's construction. It was donated to the museum in 2011 by the Milliken company, which was using it as a machine shop. The museum intends to restore the building, along with the surrounding grounds.

=== Annual Currahee Challenge ===
On the first Saturday of October, a six-mile race is held along the Colonel Sink Trail, the trail used by the paratroopers as part of their training. Known as one of the most daunting races in America. The common refrain is "Three Miles Up And Three Miles Down." The race is part of the Currahee Military Weekend, which features World War II military reenactments in a staged military camp, weapons demonstrations, book signings by veterans, a parade through the downtown historic district, a hangar dance at the airport, and a banquet with speakers and veterans.

=== Ritz Theatre ===
The Ritz Theatre is a restored 1939 Art Deco movie theater, located in the Downtown Toccoa Historic District at 139 Doyle Street. It is an active venue for a variety of entertainment.

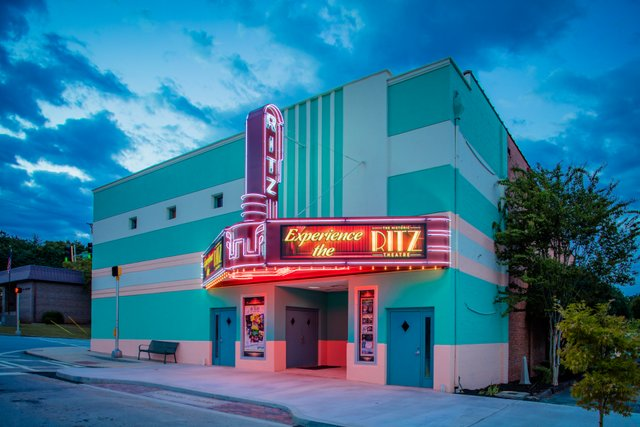
Ritz Theatre

=== Other points of interest ===
"Born from fire, and twice rebuilt from ashes, Downtown Toccoa's Albemarle Hotel has witnessed Toccoa's growth, and its struggles, for more than 100 years." The current building, dating from the 1930s, retains some of the previous structure. For many years, it was known as the Alexander Apartments. The hotel is located in the Downtown Toccoa Historic District, and is on the National Register of Historic Places.

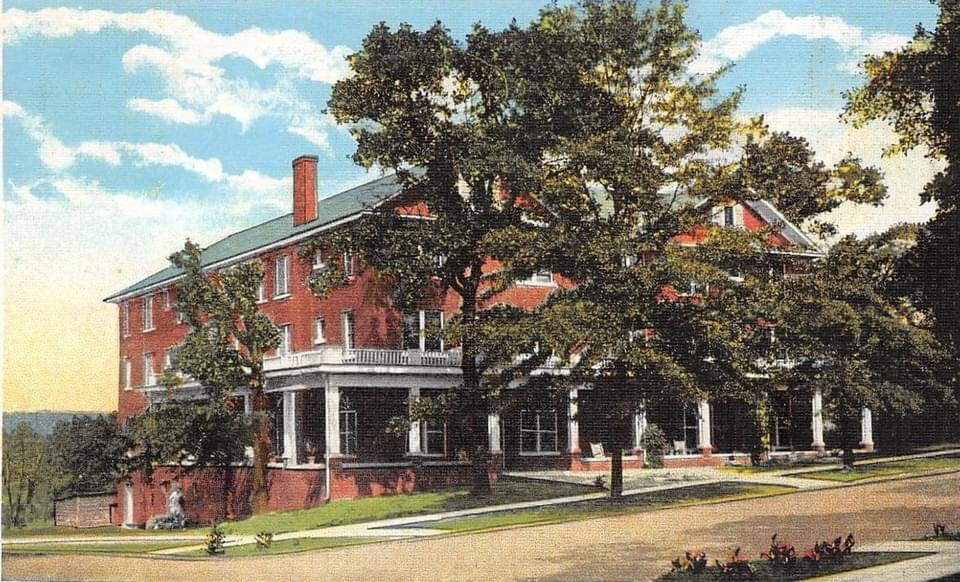
Albermarle Hotel

== Education ==
=== Stephens County Schools ===
Stephens County School District serves students in preschool through grade twelve. There are four elementary schools, a middle school, and a high school. The district has 304 full-time teachers and over 4,405 students.

=== Schools ===
- Stephens County High School (SCHS) (grades 9–12)
- Stephens County Fifth Grade Academy (at SCMS) (grade 5)
- Stephens County Middle School (SCMS) (grades 6–8)
- Liberty Elementary (grades 1–2)
- Toccoa Elementary (grades 3–4)
- Big A Elementary (grades Pre K-K)

Stephens County High School finished building its new facility in the spring of 2012. It includes a four-sided gymnasium arena, better fine arts facilities, and a larger media center.

=== Higher education ===
Toccoa is the home of Toccoa Falls College, a private Christian college. North Georgia Technical College has the Currahee campus just south of Toccoa.

== Infrastructure ==
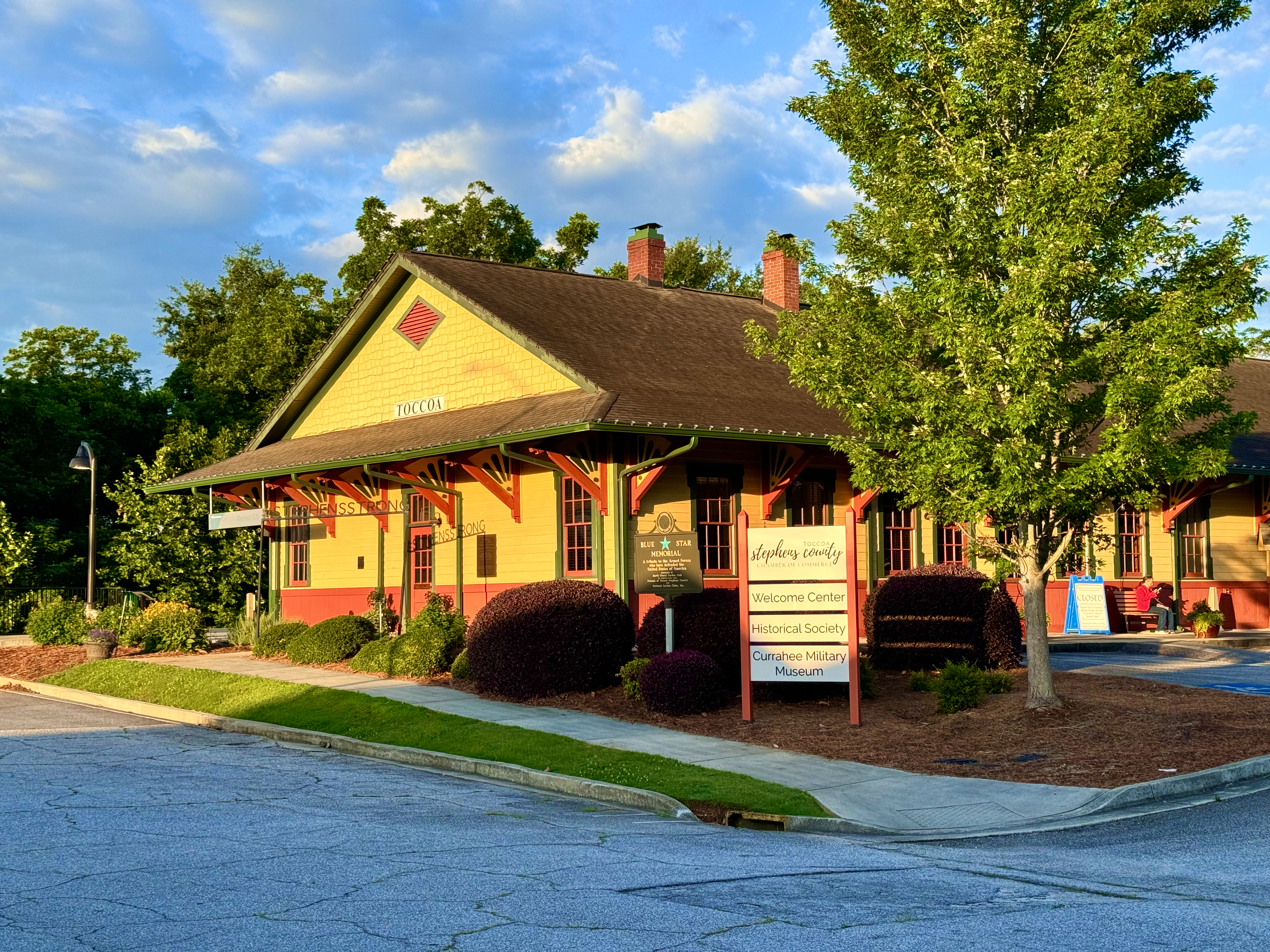
Toccoa Amtrak Station

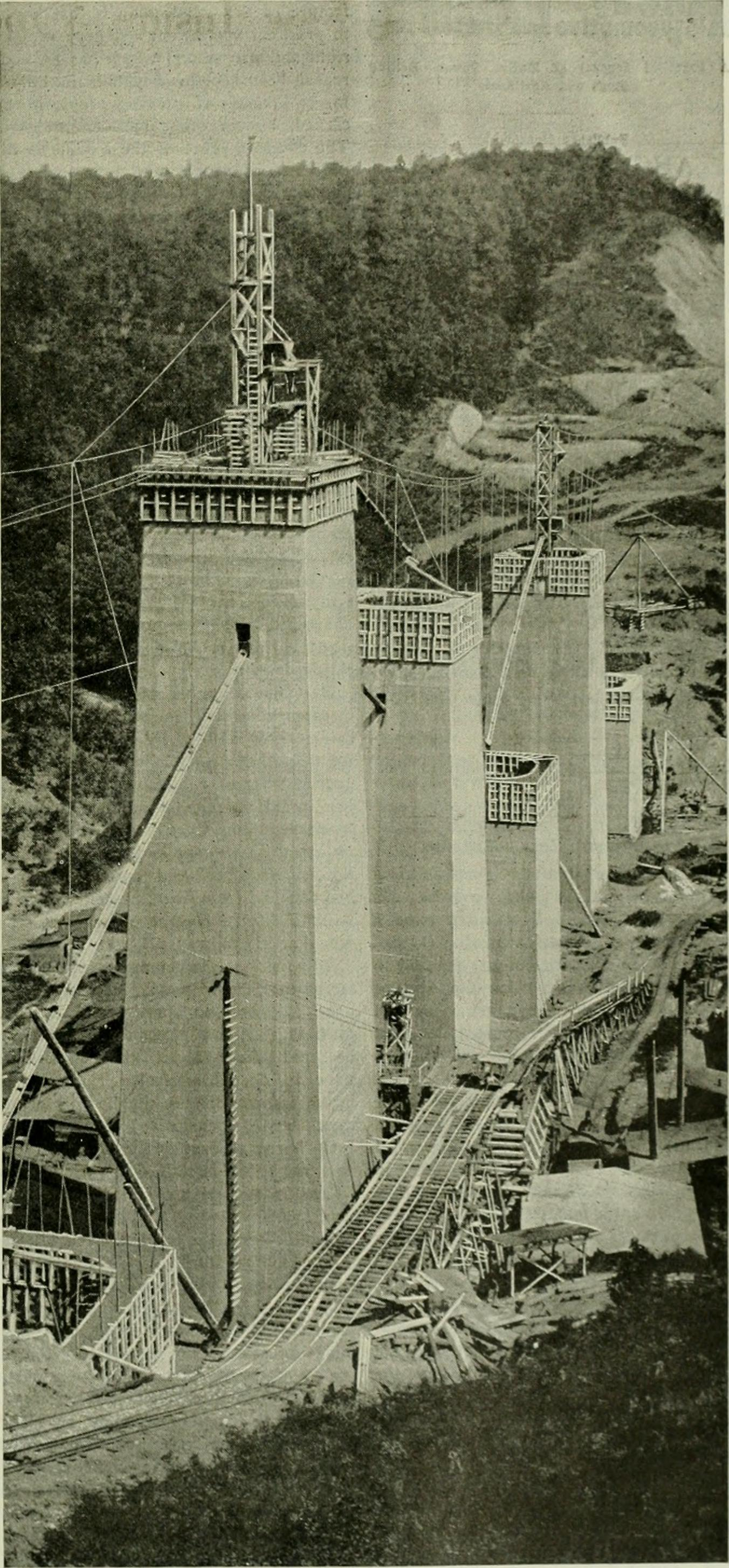
Construction of the Wells Viaduct over the North Broad River near Toccoa, 1901

=== Transportation ===
Amtrak's Crescent connects Toccoa with the cities of New York, Philadelphia, Baltimore, Washington, Charlotte, Atlanta, Birmingham, and New Orleans. The Amtrak station is at 47 North Alexander Street. The Amtrak line is shared with the Norfolk Southern Railway. Before Amtrak, Toccoa was a stop on the Airline Belle, a regional train of the Southern Railway from 1879 to 1931.

Toccoa is also home to the Toccoa Airport, a small executive airport to the northeast of town. The airport was built by R.G. LeTourneau and is sometimes referred to as R.G. LeTourneau Field.

The nearest interstate highway is Interstate 85. State Route 17 bypasses Toccoa, with an alternate route through the city. U.S. Route 123/State Route 365 runs through Toccoa as well.

== Media ==
The Toccoa Record newspaper was founded in 1873.

The WNEG (AM) and 93.1 FM radio station broadcasts from Toccoa. It first went on the air in 1956.

== Town mall ==
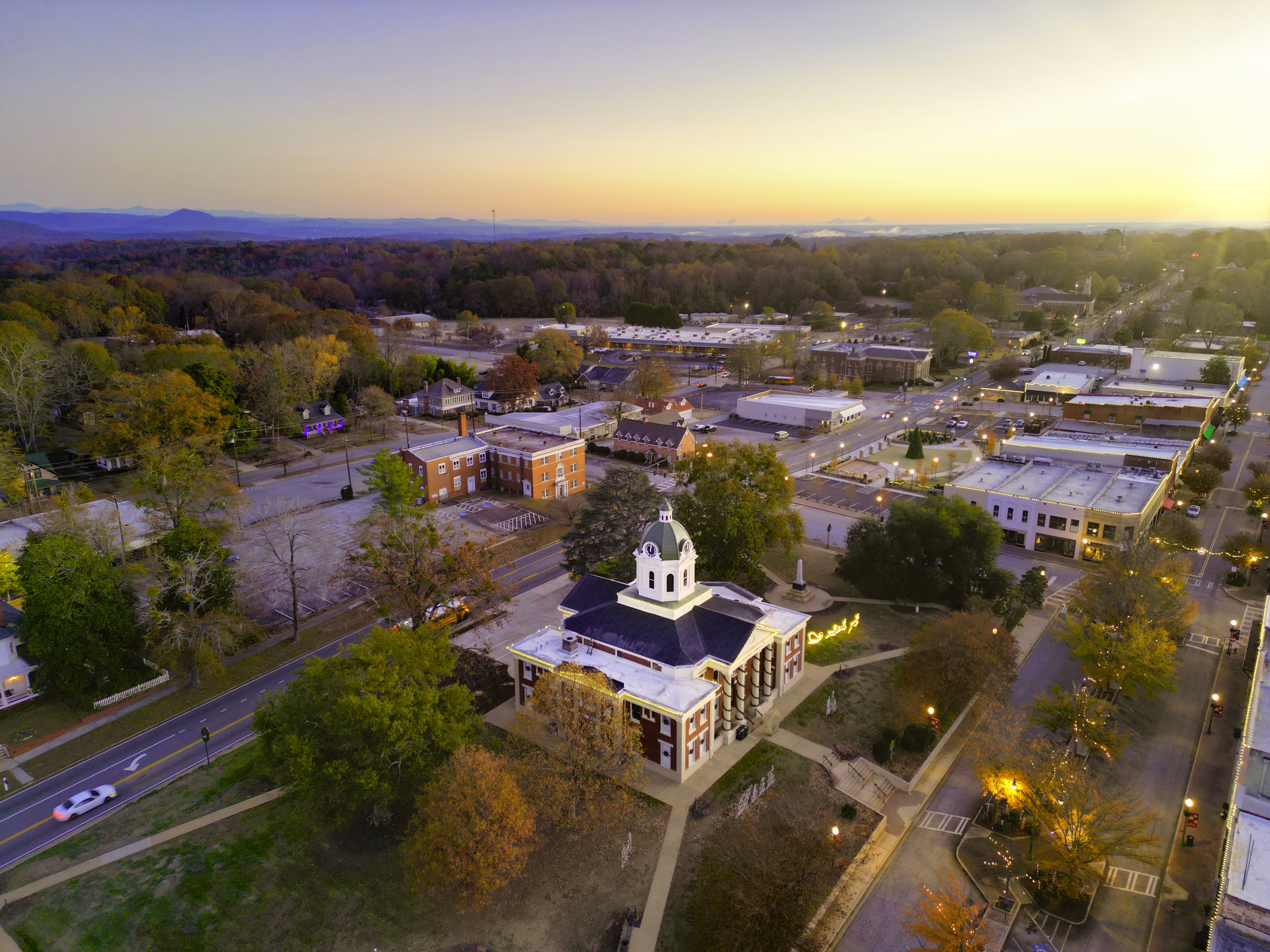
The Stephens County Courthouse in downtown Toccoa

Downtown Toccoa is located near the courthouse and the train depot, which connects to Atlanta. From the 1950s through the 1980s, business bustled in this "mall." Each day, people would flood to shop in downtown Toccoa. Several national retail outlets were then located in downtown Toccoa, including the Belk Gallant department store.

In the early 1960s, around the country, local downtown businesses faced competition with large shopping malls, and many began to fail. As an answer to the depressed conditions in downtowns, Toccoa and many other towns erected concrete canopies and closed streets to create a pedestrian mall. In less than ten years, it was evident that instead of enhancing businesses and creating a positive downtown image, these canopies actually accelerated the downtown's decline.

When the Belk Gallant department store announced it was going to move along a four lane road called Big A, community leaders organized Main Street Toccoa in 1990. In 1991, the Georgia Department of Community Affairs Resource Team recommended that the canopies be removed and that the street be opened once again to vehicular traffic. However, for many years, the project was not supported.

During that time, Main Street Toccoa implemented many changes and improvements to the downtown mall area. Brick pavers were installed and trees were planted. However, the canopies themselves began to deteriorate, and no support was found to repair them. During this time, businesses continued to flounder and many of the buildings were empty and in disrepair.

Over time, however, with growing support, approval was given to start the canopy removal project. Efforts that helped contribute community support for the project included county-wide public surveys, a University of Georgia market study, a UGA design charrette, and renderings of individual buildings without the canopies provided by the GA Trust for Historic Preservation and UGA Community Design Planning and Preservation. To gather the necessary funds for the project, Toccoa partnered with six state agencies (Appalachian Regional Commission, Georgia Department of Community Affairs, One Georgia Authority, United States Department of Agriculture, and Georgia Department of Transportation) that provided $1.3 million, with additional local funding of $552,000.

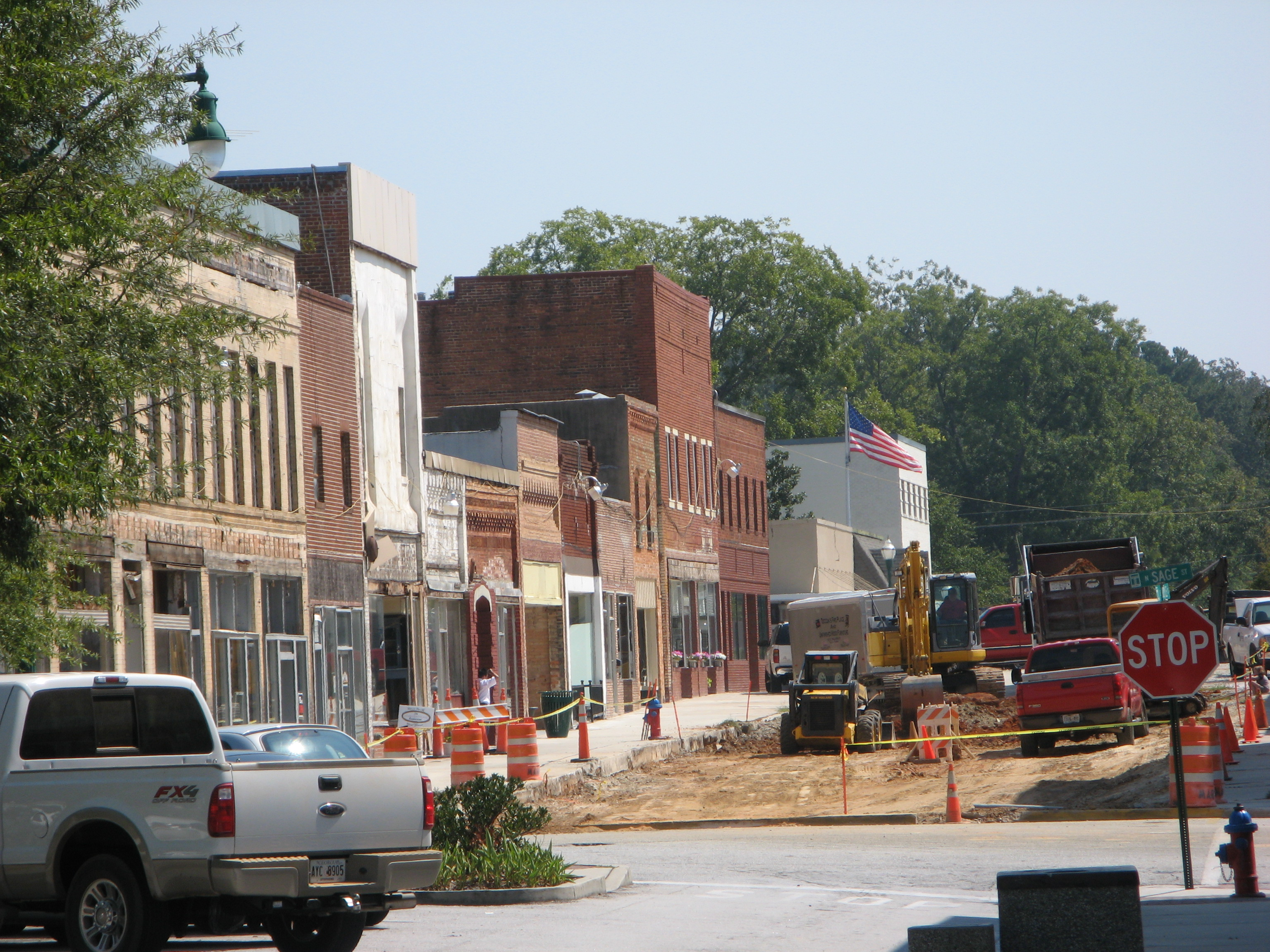
Downtown renovation construction phase, 2007

During the canopy removal and street re-opening project, private interest in downtown increased. In 2008, downtown saw 33 storefronts renovated, under the guidance of the Georgia Mountains Regional Development Center Historic Preservation Planner, 11 new business, 17 new jobs, 28 part-time jobs and 68 full-time equivalent jobs retained, and private investment of $3.5 million. Main Street was re-opened to vehicular traffic.

The Currahee Military Museum, featured in the PBS series GA Traveler, and named one of the best museums along the East Coast by the magazine Blue Ridge Mountain, is another attraction that continues downtown's resurgence. Located in the restored historic train depot, the museum features a massive exhibit of 506's Easy Company memorabilia. This World War II paratrooper company was popularized by the HBO miniseries Band of Brothers. The depot housing this museum was recently restored to its pre-1940s appearance.

Previously used as a maintenance and storage area for Norfolk Southern, the depot was transformed into a publicly owned building that is home to the Chamber, Welcome Center, Stephens County Historical Society Museum, the Currahee Military Museum, and Amtrak. Project funding was received through Transportation Enhancement Activity and GDOT funds of $400,000; local funding of $100,000, and private investment funds of over $500,000.

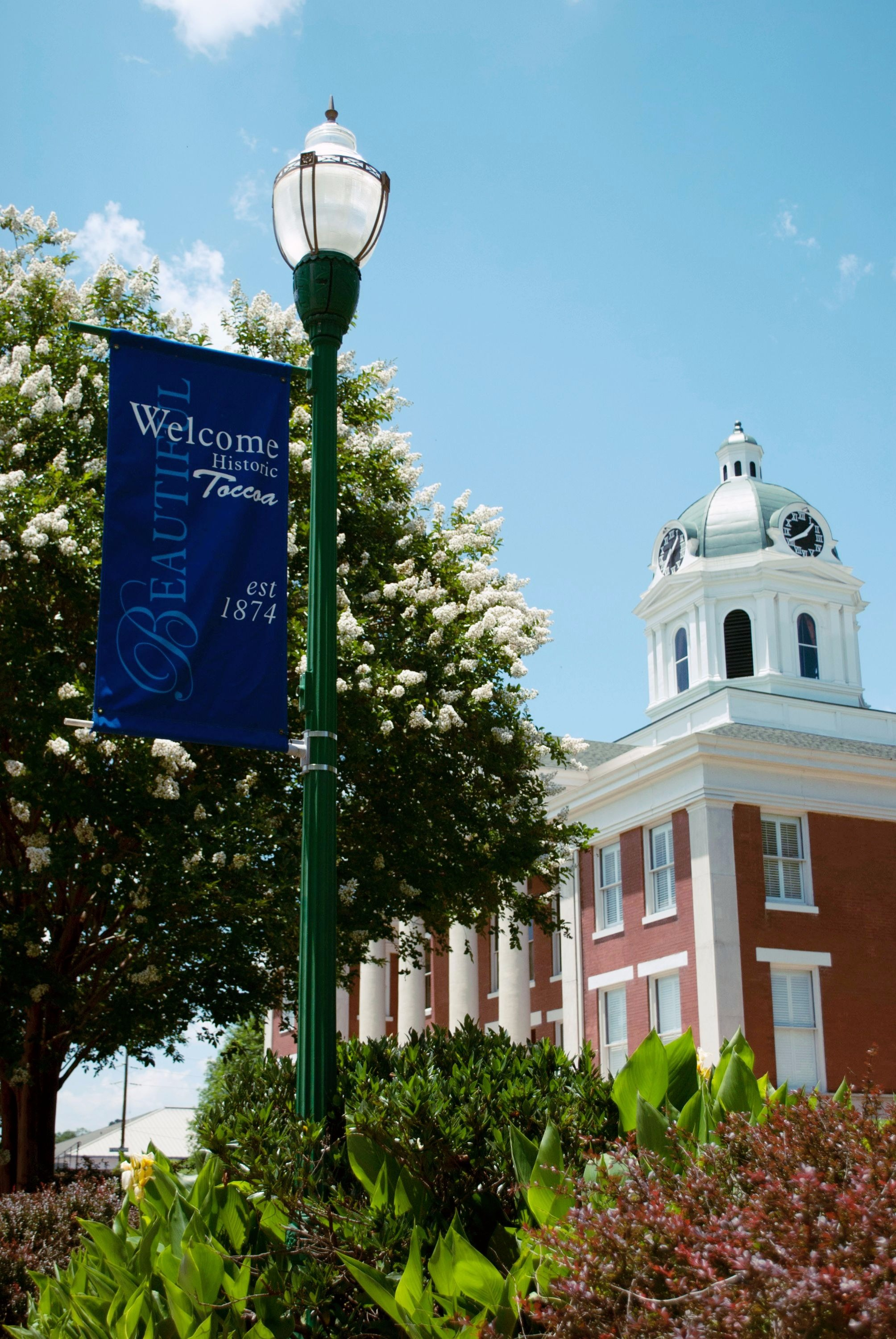
Stephens County Courthouse in downtown Toccoa

Enhancing Toccoa as a Northeast Georgia destination is the courthouse, which anchors the downtown district.

== Sister cities ==
Toccoa has no active sister city program. In the 1970s, a sister city relationship was established with Meßstetten, Germany, but the relationship has not been renewed.

== Notable people ==
The following list includes notable people who were born or have lived in Toccoa.

- Paul Anderson (1932–1994) – 1955 World weightlifting champion, 1956 gold medal winner in Olympic weightlifting; resident of Toccoa
- Howard "Doc" Ayers (1922–2020) - football coach at the University of Georgia
- Dan Biggers (1931–2011) – actor
- James Brown (1933–2006) – singer, songwriter, dancer, and bandleader
- Bobby Byrd (1934–2007) – musician, songwriter, and record producer
- Dee Clark (1938–1990) – singer
- McKenzie Coan (born 1996) - swimmer and 2016 gold medal winner in the 2016 Summer Paralympics
- Ida Cox (1896–1967) – blues singer and vaudeville performer
- Dale Davis (born 1969) – former professional basketball player
- The Famous Flames - R & B group
- Javin Gordon (born 2007) – college football player
- DeForest Kelley (1920–1999) – actor
- R. G. LeTourneau (1888–1969) – inventor and Christian philanthropist
- Herb Maffett (1907–1994) - All-American football player at the University of Georgia
- Ethan Martin (born 1989) – professional baseball player
- Evan Oglesby (born 1981) – professional football player
- Tauren Poole (born 1989) – professional football player
- Ralph E. Reed Jr. (born 1961) – political activist
- Oral Roberts (1918–2009) – pastor and televangelist
- Kimberly Schlapman (born 1969) – member of the country music band Little Big Town
- Ramblin' Tommy Scott (1917–2013) - country and rockabilly musician
- Billy Shaw (1938-2024) – former Georgia Tech and NFL football player; Pro Football Hall of Fame member
- Aaron Shust (born 1975) – Christian singer and three time Dove Award winner
- Jerry Kenneth "Ken" Swilling (born 1970) – football player and a safety on the Georgia Tech 1990 National Championship Team
- Pat Swilling (born 1964) – professional football player and politician
- The Watkins Family - Southern gospel/bluegrass music performers
- William T. Wofford (1824–1884) - Civil War general

== In literature and film ==
The novel Fireworks Over Toccoa by Jeffrey Stepakoff was published by St. Martin's Press and released nationwide on March 30, 2010. A day-long celebration was held in Toccoa culminating in a fireworks display at Boyd Field in the evening.

Several films have been shot in Toccoa:

- County Line (2017) - starring Tom Wopat, Jeff Fahey, and Grant Goodeve
- Heritage Falls (2016) - starring David Keith
- Legal Action (2018) - starring Eric Close, Nick Searcy, and Tommy Flanagan
- The Legend of 5 Mile Cave (2018) - starring Adam Baldwin and Jeremy Sumpter
- Southern Comfort (2001) - documentary about resident trans man Robert Eads
- The Warrant (2019) - starring Neal McDonough, Steven R. McQueen, Casper Van Dien, and Annabeth Gish
- When We Last Spoke (2018) - starring Cloris Leachman, Corbin Bernsen, and Melissa Gilbert

== In media ==
The Weather Channel remembered the 1977 Toccoa Falls dam break and flood.

On May 7, 2000, Mary Ann Stephens of Toccoa was shot to death outside a Ramada Inn in Jacksonville, Florida while on vacation with her husband. The incident received national attention and resulted in an Academy Award-winning French documentary, Murder on a Sunday Morning, on the arrest and acquittal of the original suspect.

== Awards ==
- 2008 Excellence in Downtown Development Award from the Georgia Downtown Association
- 2009 Great America Main Street Top Ten Semi-finalist from the National Trust for Historic Preservation
- 2009 Excellence in Rehabilitation Award from the Georgia Trust for Historic Preservation
- 2014 and again in 2021 Georgia Exceptional Main Street (GEMS) Community designation from the Georgia Department of Community Affairs, the highest designation awarded in the state
- 2017 Chairman's Award for Excellence in Historic Rehabilitation from the Georgia Trust for Historic Preservation
- 2018 Downtown Excellence Award in Promotions from the Georgia Downtown Association
- 2018 Community Grand Award from the Georgia Urban Forest Council
- 2019 Live, Work, Play Community award from GeorgiaTrend and the Georgia Municipal Association

== Kelly Barnes Dam failure ==
On November 6, 1977, the earthen Kelly Barnes Dam failed and released over 170 million gallons of water above the Toccoa Falls College campus. The failure killed 20 children and 19 adults. First Lady Rosalynn Carter visited Toccoa the next day.

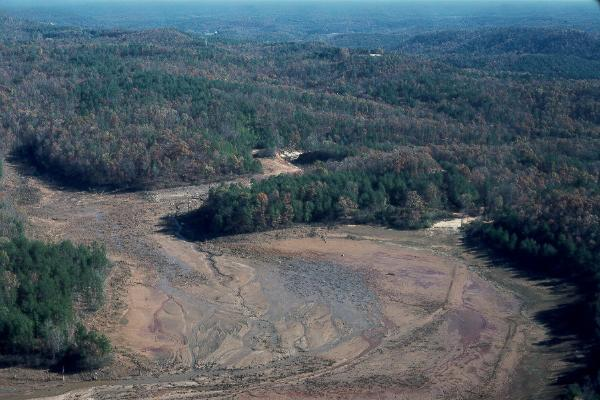
Kelly Barnes Lake after the dam break, 1977
