= Avalon, Georgia =

- Town
- Location in Stephens County and the state of Georgia

- Location in Georgia Avalon (the United States) Avalon (North America)
- Coordinates: 34°30′6″N 83°11′40″W
- Country: United States
- State: Georgia
- County: Stephens

Area
  - Total: 1.77 sq mi (4.58 km^{2})
  - Land: 1.76 sq mi (4.57 km^{2})
  - Water: 0 sq mi (0.00 km^{2})
- Elevation: 922 ft (281 m)

Population (2020)
  - Total: 233
  - Density: 131.9/sq mi (50.93/km^{2})
- Time zone: UTC-5 (Eastern (EST))
  - Summer (DST): UTC-4 (EDT)
- FIPS code: 13-04392
- GNIS feature ID: 0326981

Avalon is a town in Stephens County, Georgia, United States. As of the 2020 census, the city had a population of 233. Avalon was named for the Arthurian island of paradise. It was founded in 1882 by Richard Dempsey Yow, and incorporated in 1909. Yow and two brothers started a successful mercantile business there. Although it was at one time a self-contained village with a railway station, post office, school, and church, Avalon's tiny population now shares these functions with those dwelling in nearby towns.

== Geography ==
Avalon is located at 34°30′6″N 83°11′40″W (34.501609, -83.194322).

According to the United States Census Bureau, the town has a total area of 1.8 square miles (4.7 km^{2}), all land.

== Demographics ==
Historical population
Census	Pop.	Note	%±
1910	60		—
1920	100		66.7%
1930	59		−41.0%
1940	113		91.5%
1950	151		33.6%
1960	194		28.5%
1970	204		5.2%
1980	200		−2.0%
1990	159		−20.5%
2000	278		74.8%
2010	213		−23.4%
2020	233		9.4%
U.S. Decennial Census

As of the census of 2000, there were 278 people, 109 households, and 80 families residing in the town. The population density was 157.9 inhabitants per square mile (61.0/km^{2}). There were 116 housing units at an average density of 65.9 per square mile (25.4/km^{2}). The racial makeup of the town was 91.73% White, 7.91% African American and 0.36% Asian. Hispanic or Latino of any race were 2.52% of the population.

There were 109 households, out of which 34.9% had children under the age of 18 living with them, 60.6% were married couples living together, 11.9% had a female householder with no husband present, and 25.7% were non-families. 23.9% of all households were made up of individuals, and 5.5% had someone living alone who was 65 years of age or older. The average household size was 2.55 and the average family size was 3.02.

In the town, the population was spread out, with 29.1% under the age of 18, 5.0% from 18 to 24, 28.4% from 25 to 44, 27.0% from 45 to 64, and 10.4% who were 65 years of age or older. The median age was 36 years. For every 100 females, there were 94.4 males. For every 100 females age 18 and over, there were 91.3 males.

The median income for a household in the town was $31,000, and the median income for a family was $35,625. Males had a median income of $29,500 versus $16,042 for females. The per capita income for the town was $13,701. About 16.0% of families and 15.1% of the population were below the poverty line, including 14.3% of those under the age of eighteen and 38.7% of those 65 or over.
