= List of power stations in South Carolina =

Sources of South Carolina utility-scale electricity generation in gigawatt-hours, full-year 2025:
1. Nuclear: 56,671 (54.1%)
2. Natural gas: 22,490 (21.5%)
3. Coal: 18,178 (17.3%)
4. Solar: 3,312 (3.16%)
5. Hydroelectric: 2,497 (2.38%)
6. Biomass: 1,575 (1.50%)
7. Petroleum: 103 (0.10%)

This is a list of electricity-generating power stations in the U.S. state of South Carolina, sorted by type and name. In 2024, South Carolina had a total summer capacity of 24.7 GW through all of its power plants, and a net generation of 100,485 GWh. In 2025, the electrical energy generation mix was 54.1% nuclear, 21.5% natural gas, 17.3% coal, 3.2% solar, 2.4% hydroelectric, 1.5% biomass, and 0.1% petroleum.

South Carolina is the nation's third largest producer of nuclear power, with four nuclear plants. Natural gas has been the most rapidly growing source of generation; quadrupling over the decade starting 2010. Data from the U.S. Energy Information Administration serves as a general reference.

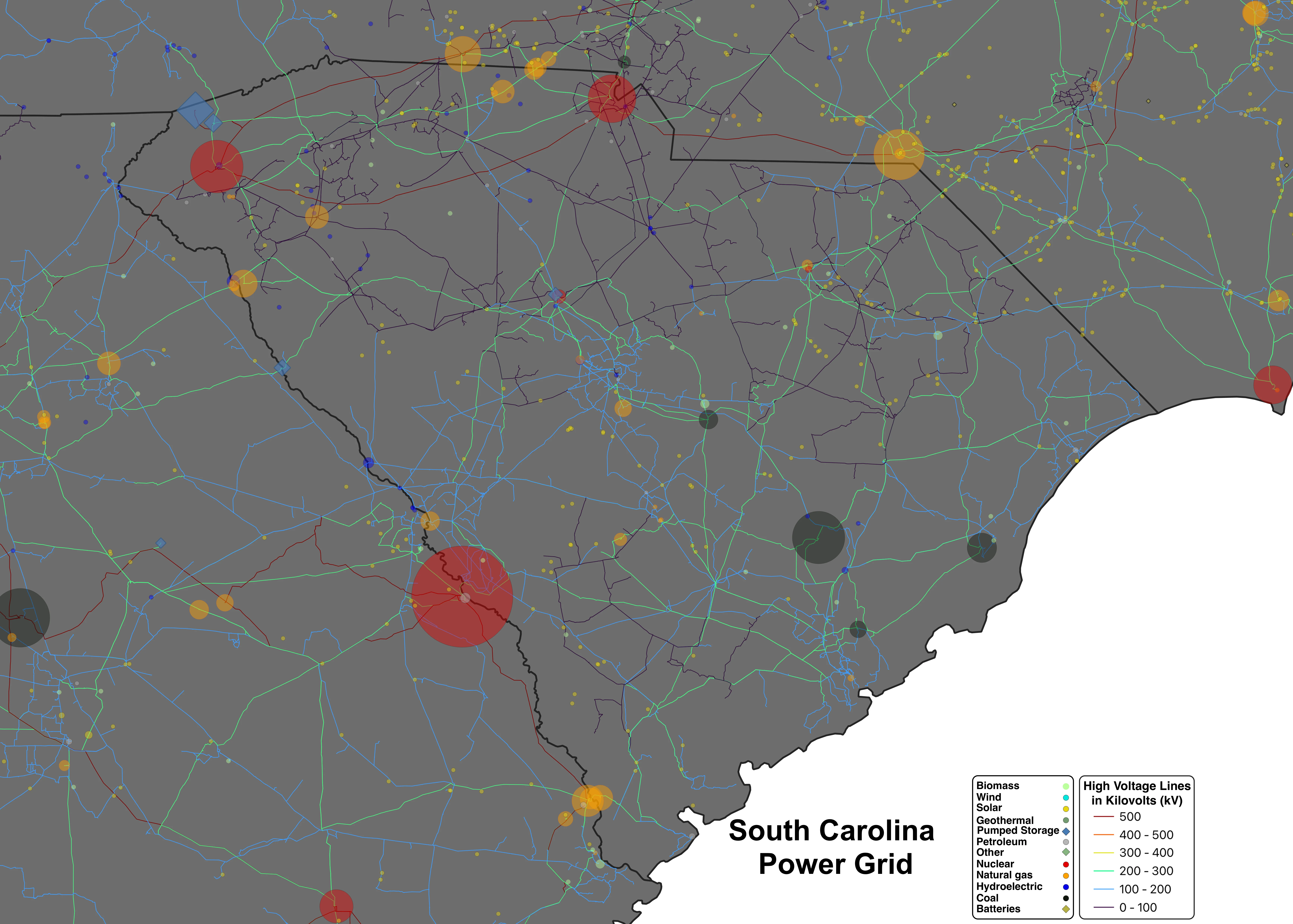
South Carolina power grid

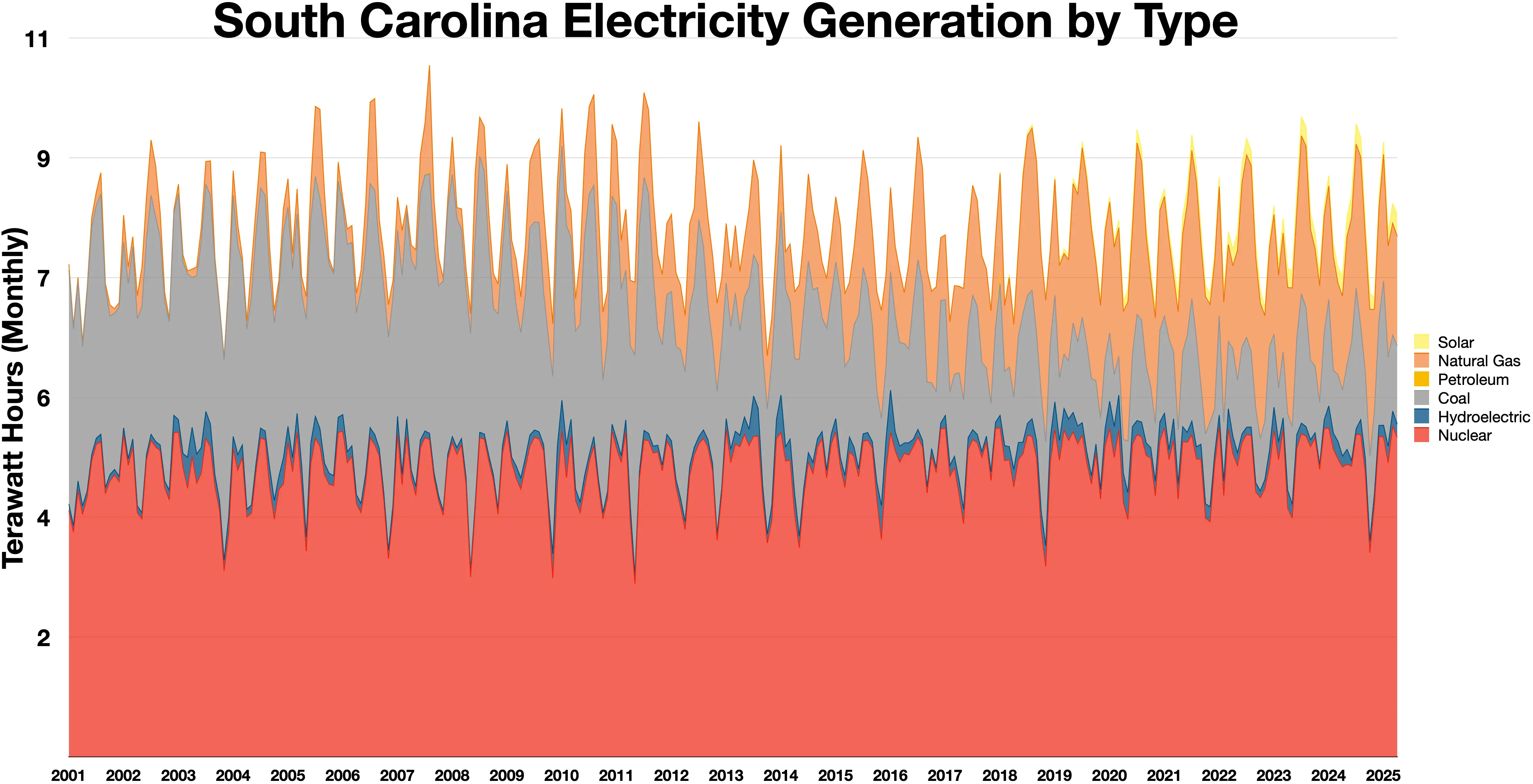
South Carolina electricity generation by type

== Nuclear power stations ==
Plant	Location	Capacity (MW)	Year opened	Refs
Catawba Nuclear Station	35°03′01″N 81°04′10″W	2,310	1985 (Unit 1 - 1160MW); 1986 (Unit 2 - 1150MW)	
H. B. Robinson Nuclear Generating Station	34°24′06″N 80°09′32″W	741	1971	
Oconee Nuclear Station	34°47′38″N 82°53′55″W	2,554	1973 (Unit 1 - 847MW); 1974 (Unit 2 - 848MW); 1974 (Unit 3 - 859MW)	
Virgil C. Summer Nuclear Generating Station	34°17′54″N 81°18′55″W	971	1984	

== Fossil-fuel power stations ==
=== Coal ===
Name	Location	Coordinates	Capacity (MW)	Coal type	Year opened	Operational/closure date	Refs
Canadys Station	Colleton County	33°03′52″N 80°37′25″W	490		1962 (Unit 1 - 136MW); 1964 (Unit 2 - 136MW); 1967 (Unit 3 - 218MW)	Closed; 2012 - Unit 1; 2017 - Units 2 & 3^{[A]}	
Cope Station	Orangeburg County	33°22′01″N 81°02′04″W	430	^{[B]}	1996 (Unit 1)	Operational; Coal use to cease in 2030	
Cross Generating Station	Berkeley County	33°22′19″N 80°06′20″W	2,390	^{[C]}	1984 (Unit 1 - 556MW); 1995 (Unit 2 - 591MW); 2007 (Unit 3 - 591MW); 2008 (Unit 4 - 652MW)	Operational	
Jefferies Generating Station	Berkeley County	33°14′40″N 79°59′27″W	346		1970 (Unit 1 - 173MW); 1970 (Unit 2 - 173MW)	Closed - 2012	
Wateree Station	Richland County	33°49′43″N 80°37′21″W	772		1970 (Unit 1 - 386MW); 1971 (Unit 2 - 386MW)	Operational; Plant to close in 2028	
Williams Station	Berkeley County	33°01′22″N 79°55′39″W	633		1973 (Unit 1)	Operational; Plant to close in 2028	
Winyah Generating Station	Georgetown County	33°19′49″N 79°21′27″W	1,260		1975 (Unit 1 - 315MW); 1977 (Unit 2 - 315MW); 1980 (Unit 3 - 315MW); 1981 (Unit 4 - 315MW)	Operational; Two units to close by 2023; Two units to close by 2027	

^{A} Units 2 and 3 were originally planned to be converted to natural gas as an interim step to closure, but those plans were abandoned.
^{B} Fueled by mix of coal and natural gas
^{C} Units 3 and 4 are permitted to fire up to 30% petcoke by weight on either boiler.

=== Natural gas ===
Plant	County	Location	Capacity (MW)	Year opened	Refs
Columbia Energy Center	Calhoun	33°52′11″N 81°01′04″W	543	2004	
Jasper	Jasper	32°21′34″N 81°07′27″W	852	2004	
John S. Rainey Generating Station	Anderson	34°20′52″N 82°46′28″W	460	2001	
Urquhart	Aiken	33°26′06″N 81°54′40″W	452	2002	
W.S. Lee Steam Station	Anderson	34°36′08″N 82°26′06″W	890	2018	

== Renewable power stations ==
=== Biomass ===
Name	Location	Capacity (MW)	Year opened	Refs
Florence Mill	34°08′59″N 79°33′38″W	98.8	1963/1974/1987	
International Paper Eastover	33°53′14″N 80°38′23″W	103.0	1984/1991	
International Paper Georgetown Mill	33°21′37″N 79°18′09″W	80.4	1966/1984	
Kapstone	32°54′00″N 79°58′00″W	85.0	1999	
Marlboro Mill	34°36′18″N 79°47′06″W	34.2	2010	
Sonoco Products	34°23′07″N 80°04′04″W	38.0	1947/1957	

=== Hydroelectric ===
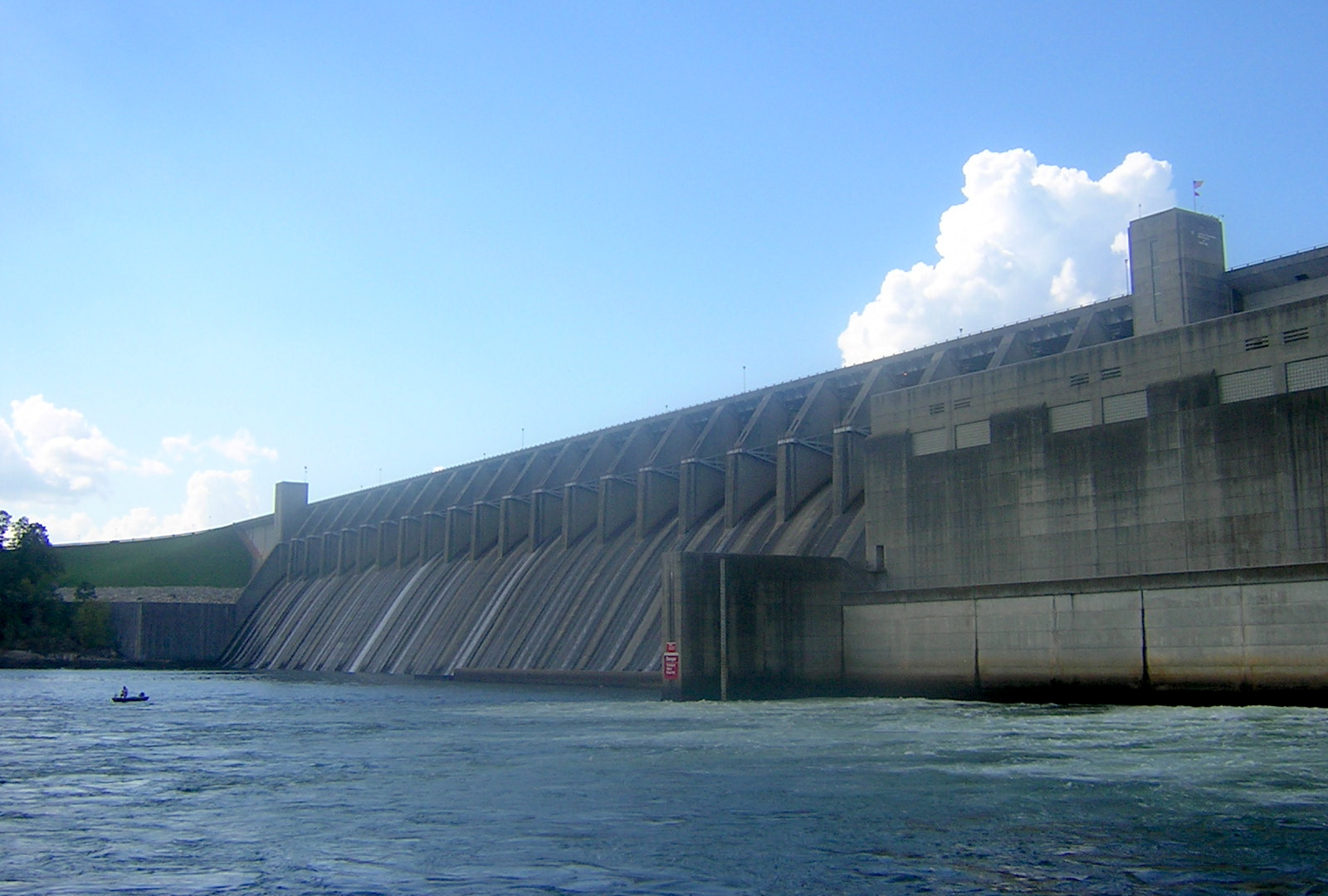
J. Strom Thurmond Dam

Name	Location	Capacity (MW)	Year opened	Refs
Hartwell Dam	34°21′28″N 82°49′17″W	421	1962	
J. Strom Thurmond Dam	33°39′39″N 82°11′59″W	361.9	1953/1954	
Jefferies Hydroelectric Station	33°14′40″N 79°59′27″W	145.2	1942	
Parr Hydro	34°15′41″N 81°19′51″W	15.0	1914/1921	
Richard B. Russell Dam power plant	34°01′30″N 82°35′39″W	300	1985	
Saluda Dam	34°03′12″N 81°13′04″W	207.3	1996	

=== Solar ===
Name	Location	Capacity (MW)	Year opened	Refs
Centerfield Solar	34°42′11″N 80°07′34″W	75.0	2020	
Moffett Solar	32°38′13″N 80°59′24″W	69.5	2017	
Palmetto Plains	33°20′25″N 80°41′50″W	75.0	2019	
Peony Solar	33°30′07″N 81°15′14″W	39.0	2018	
Seabrook Solar	32°33′52″N 80°44′31″W	72.5	2019	
Shaw Creek Solar	33°40′29″N 81°45′16″W	74.9	2019	

== Storage power stations ==
=== Pumped storage ===
Name	Location	Capacity (MW)	Year opened	Refs
Bad Creek Hydroelectric Station	35°00′42″N 83°01′16″W	1,060	1991	
Fairfield Pumped Storage	34°18′22″N 81°19′51″W	576	1978	
Lake Jocassee Power Station	34°57′34″N 82°54′53″W	780	1973/1975	
Richard B. Russell pumped storage	34°01′30″N 82°35′39″W	300	1996	

== See also ==
- List of power stations in the United States
- List of pumped-storage hydroelectric power stations
