= Nancy Hart =

American Revolutionary War spy (1741–1830)

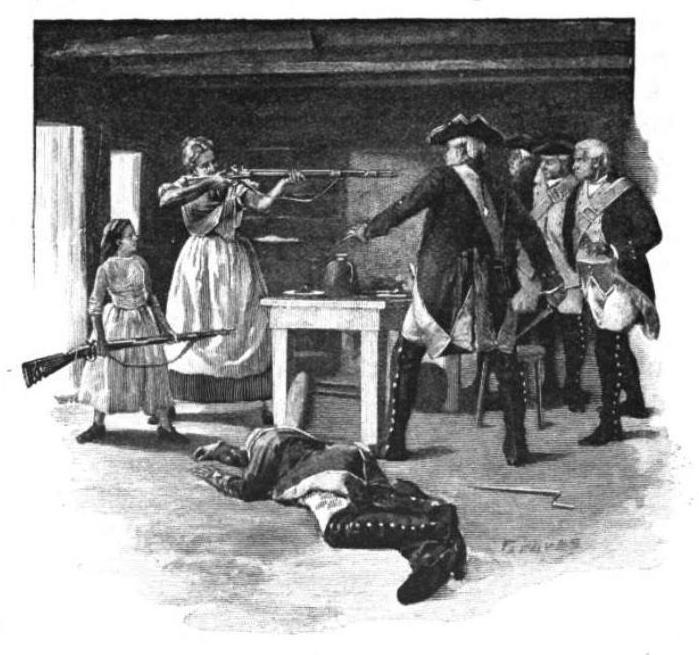
- Nancy Hart, as depicted in an 1865 book
- Born: Around 1741; Province of North Carolina, British America
- Died: 1830; Humphreys County, Tennessee, U.S.
- Occupations: Spy, housewife
- Spouse: Benjamin Hart
- Children: Six sons and two daughters
- Espionage activity
- Allegiance: United States of America

Nancy Morgan Hart (c. 1741–1830) was a rebel heroine of the American Revolutionary War, noted for her exploits against Loyalists in the northeast Georgia backcountry. She is characterized as a tough, strong and resourceful frontier woman who repeatedly outsmarted Tory soldiers, and killed some outright. Stories about her are mostly unsupported by contemporary documentation, and it has been impossible for researchers to entirely distinguish fact from folklore.

== Early life ==
Although explicit details concerning most of her life are unknown, Nancy Ann Morgan Hart is believed to have been born in North Carolina around 1741, in the Yadkin River valley, though some researchers think that she was born in Pennsylvania or New York state. She married Benjamin Hart of that area. His extended family's descendants included such famous later political figures as Missouri Senator Thomas Hart Benton and Kentucky Senator Henry Clay.

During the early 1770s, Nancy, Benjamin and their family left North Carolina and migrated to Georgia, settling in the extremely fertile Broad River valley of the northeast Piedmont area. There she drew on her many frontier skills, including herbalism, hunting and shooting.

Hart was well connected through family ties to other prominent figures in early American history. She was a cousin to Revolutionary War general Daniel Morgan, who commanded victorious American forces at the Battle of Cowpens in South Carolina on January 17, 1781.

According to contemporary accounts, "Aunt Nancy", as she was often called, was a tall, gangly woman. She was rough-hewn and rawboned, with red hair and a face scarred by smallpox. One early account said that Hart had "no share of beauty—a fact she herself would have readily acknowledged, had she ever enjoyed an opportunity of looking into a mirror."

Hart was said to have a feisty personal demeanor characterized by a hotheaded temper, a fearless spirit, and a penchant for exacting vengeance upon those who offended her or harmed her family and friends. Many remembered that she, rather than her husband, ran the Hart household. They had a total of six sons and two daughters. Although she was illiterate, Hart was amply blessed with the skills and knowledge necessary for frontier survival; she was an expert herbalist, a skilled hunter, and an excellent shooter.

== Revolutionary War accounts ==
According to one account, during the Revolution, a group of five or six Tory soldiers came by the Hart house sometime in 1779 looking either for food or a Whig they were pursuing (accounts vary). The soldiers demanded that Hart cook them one of her turkeys, and she agreed to feed them. As they entered the cabin, they placed their guns by the door before sitting at her table to eat. As they were drinking and eating, she pushed their guns outside through a hole in the wall of the cabin. After the soldiers had been drinking a sufficient time, she grabbed one of the remaining guns and ordered the men to stay still. One ignored her threat, so she shot and killed him. Another made a move toward the weapons, and she killed him as well. She held the remaining Tories captive until her husband and neighbors arrived. According to legend, her husband wanted to shoot the soldiers outright, but she demanded that they be hanged, which was accomplished from a nearby tree.

The various versions of this story provide different details, but in 1912 construction crews working on the Elberton and Eastern Railroad in the area found evidence that seemed to validate the legend. While grading a railroad site less than a mile from the old Hart Cabin, the workers found five or six skeletons buried neatly in a row. A few of the skeletons' necks were broken, which suggested they had been hanged. They were determined to have been buried for at least 100 years.

In her 1925 county history, Cook published a version based on an 1825 newspaper article. McIntosh quoted two such stories in a 1940 history of Elbert County.

== Other stories ==
Mrs. Louisa H. Kendall was the niece of John Hart, the son whom Nancy lived with in later life. Kendall wrote a letter in 1872 recalling some of the stories her uncle had heard from his mother. According to this letter, once when Nancy was taking a bag of grain to the mill, a band of Tories forced her off her horse and threw the grain to the ground. Undaunted, Hart picked up the heavy bag and walked the rest of the way to the mill. Nancy Hart was said to have acted as a sniper, killing Tories as they came across the Broad River.

McIntosh quotes a Mr. Snead, who was also related to the Harts. He said that one time during the war, Nancy was cooking lye soap in her cabin when her daughter discovered a spy looking through a crack in the wall. Hart threw a ladle of the boiling soap into the spy's eyes, went outside and tied him up, and turned him over to the local Patriot militia.

Two accounts say that Nancy dressed as a man in order to enter Tory camps, where she could overhear talk and observe the layouts and other elements of military value.

According to folklore, the local Native Americans referred to her as "Wahatche" which may translate to "War Woman", and named a creek for her. But many scholars dispute this, as there were records of the Cherokee name for the creek prior to the war. In addition, the late 19th-century ethnographer James Mooney noted, "Several cases of women acting the part of warriors are on record among the Cherokee."

== Life after the war ==
George Rockingham Gilmer, twice governor of Georgia before 1850, knew Hart personally. In an account of early settlers which he published in 1855, he wrote that she became "religious" after the war:

A Methodist society was formed in her neighborhood. She went to the house of worship in search of relief. She found the good people assembled in class meeting, and the door closed against intruders. She took out her knife, cut the fastening and stalked in. She heard how the wicked might work out their salvation; became a shouting Christian, fought the devil as manfully as she fought the Tories . . .

During the late 1780s, the Harts moved to Brunswick, Georgia. (Some accounts suggest that they may have spent time in Alabama and South Carolina as well). Benjamin Hart died shortly thereafter. Nancy Hart returned to the settlement on the Broad River but found that a flood had washed away their former cabin. Eventually, she settled with her son John Hart and his family along the Oconee River in Clarke County near Athens. Around 1803 John Hart took his mother and family to Henderson County, Kentucky, where they settled again near relatives. Hart spent the remaining years of her life there. She was buried in the Hart family cemetery a few miles outside of Henderson.

== Motivations ==
Patriot beliefs and her deep desire to rid her home area of Loyalist (Tory) and British forces. External Link

== Legacy ==
On the approximate site of Hart's frontier cabin along River Road in Elbert County, the Daughters of the American Revolution erected a replica cabin in the early 20th century. They used chimney stones recovered from the site of the original cabin, which had stood on the crest of a large hill overlooking Wahachee Creek.

Georgians have memorialized Nancy Hart in several place names:

- Hart County, organized to the north of Elbert County, was named for her, as was its county seat, Hartwell.
- During the American Civil War (1861–1865), a group of women in LaGrange, Georgia founded an all-female militia company, which they named the Nancy Harts, to defend the town from the Union Army. Most of the men of fighting age had been drawn off to war.
- In the 20th century, nearby Lake Hartwell and Hartwell Dam, Hart State Park, and the Nancy Hart Highway (Georgia Route 77) commemorate the legendary woman.
- In 1997 Hart was inducted into Georgia Women of Achievement.
- The Milledgeville, Georgia chapter of the National Society of the Daughters of the American Revolution was renamed in honor of Nancy Hart.
