= Lake Strom Thurmond =

Man-made lake in Georgia and South Carolina, United States

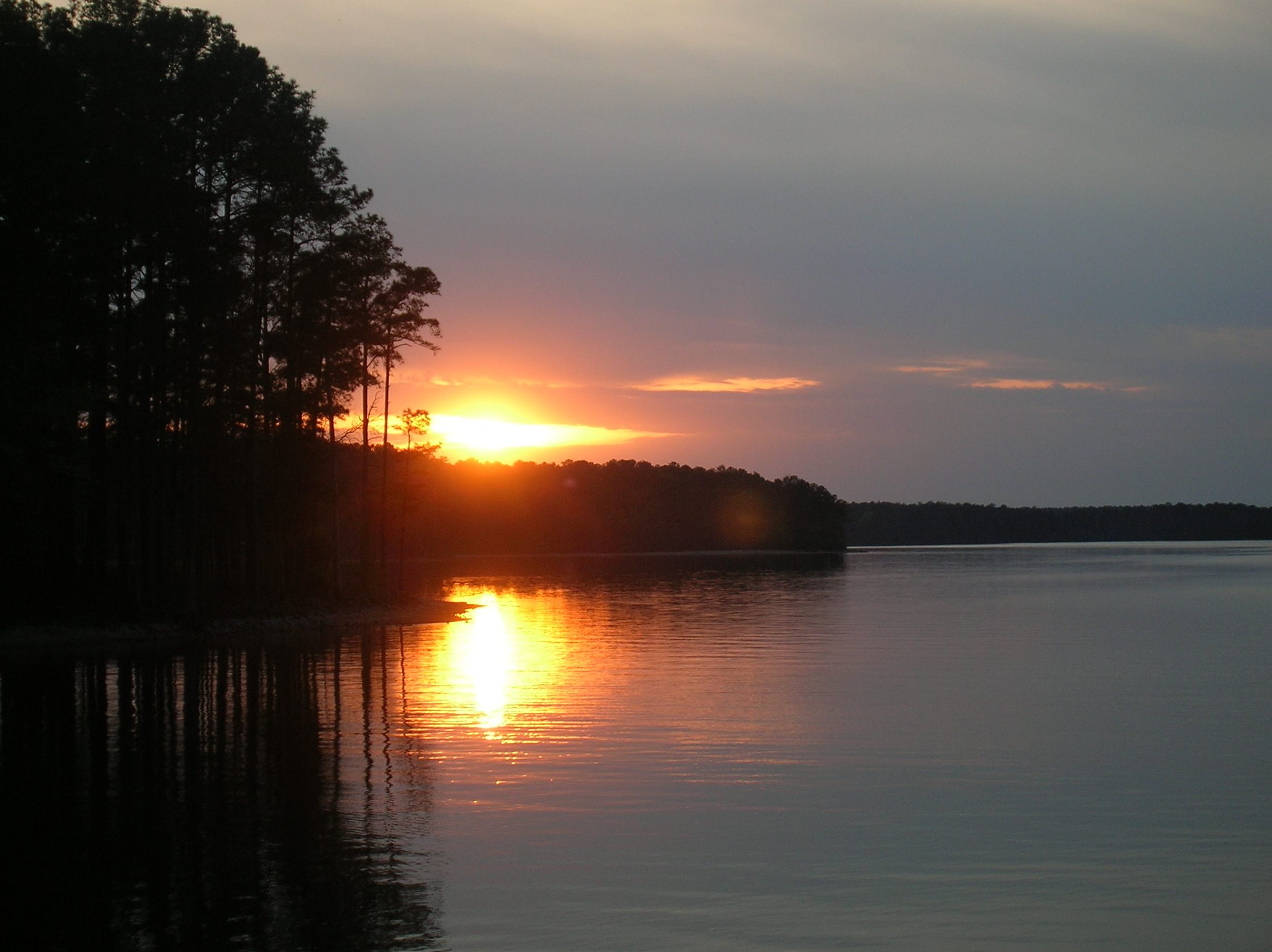
- Sunset on the Georgia side of Lake Strom Thurmond (Clarks Hill Lake), April 2006

- Location within Georgia Location within the United States
- Location: McCormick County, SC & Lincoln County, GA & Columbia County, GA McDuffie county Wilkes county
- Coordinates: 33°39′40″N 82°11′57″W
- Lake type: reservoir
- Primary inflows: Savannah River
- Primary outflows: Savannah River
- Basin countries: United States
- Surface area: 71,100 acres (288 km^{2})
- Max. depth: 180 ft (54.8 m)
- Surface elevation: 330 ft (100 m)

Lake Strom Thurmond, officially designated J. Strom Thurmond Reservoir at the federal level, and Clarks Hill Lake by the state of Georgia, is a man-made reservoir at the border between the U.S. states of Georgia and South Carolina in the Savannah River Basin.

== Description ==
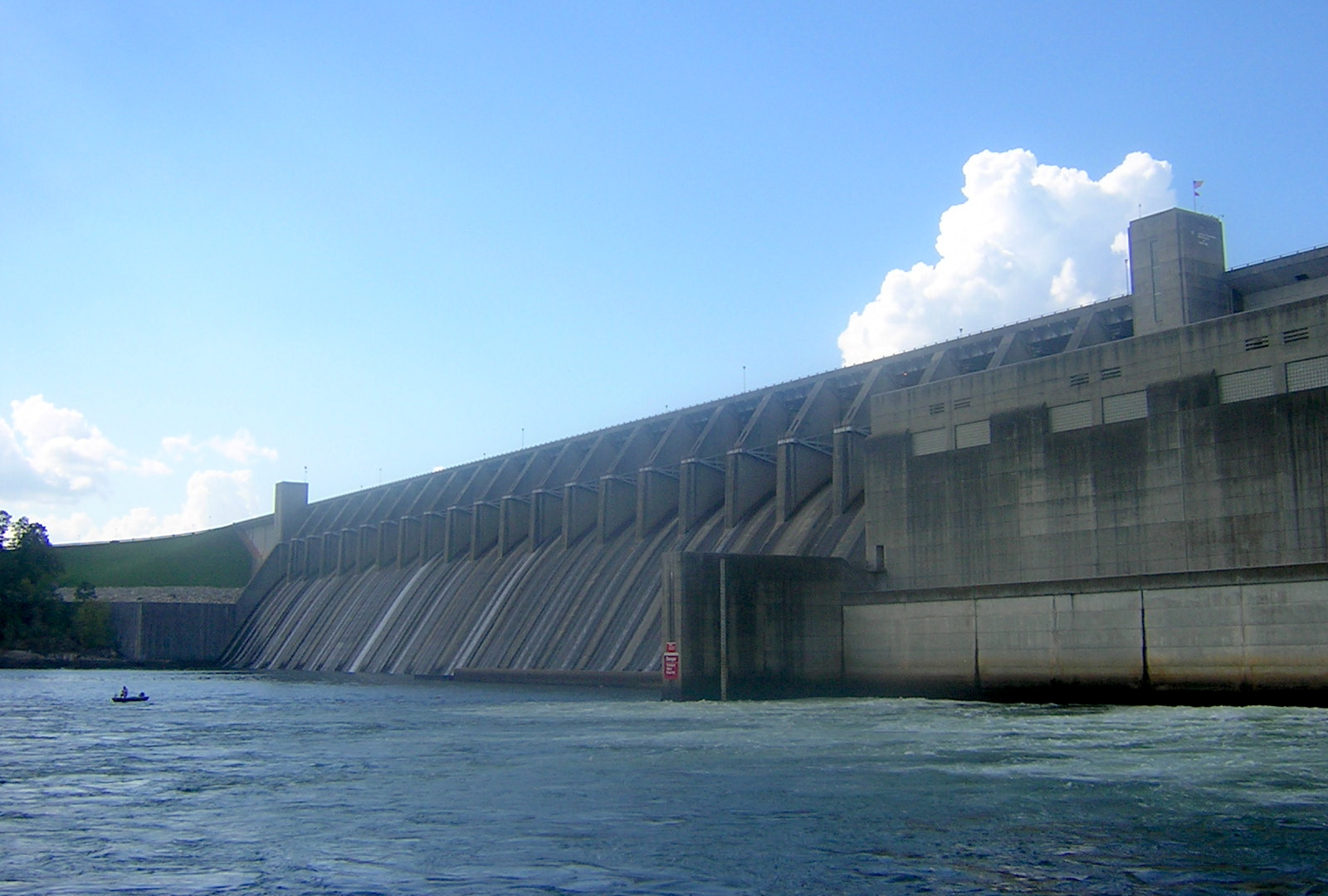
The J. Strom Thurmond Dam, as seen from the fishing pier below, September 2007

The reservoir was created by the J. Strom Thurmond Dam during 1951 and 1952 by the U.S. Army Corps of Engineers near the confluence of the Little River and the Savannah River. At 71,000 acres (290 km^{2}), it is the third-largest artificial lake east of the Mississippi River, behind the Kentucky Lake on the Tennessee River and Lake Marion on the Santee River. The J. Strom Thurmond Dam is located upstream from Augusta, Georgia.

The Thurmond Lake is one of the Southeast's largest and most popular public recreation lakes. The dam was built by the U.S. Army Corps of Engineers between 1946 and 1954, but the lake was filled during 1951 and 1952 as part of a flood control, hydropower, and navigation project. Its legally authorized purposes now include recreation, water quality, water supply, and fish and wildlife management. Each year, millions of people use the many public parks, marinas, and campgrounds conveniently located around Thurmond Lake for a variety of outdoor recreational experiences, making it one of the 10 most visited Corps lakes in the nation.

Thurmond Lake is a man-made lake bordering Georgia and South Carolina on the Savannah, Broad, and Little Rivers. The lake is created by the J. Strom Thurmond Dam located on the Savannah River 22 miles (35 km) above Augusta, Georgia and 239.5 miles (385.4 km) above the mouth of the Savannah River. The lake extends 39.4 miles (63.4 km) up the Savannah River, 29 miles (47 km) up the Little River in Georgia, and 6.5 miles (10.5 km) up the Broad River in Georgia, and 17 miles (27 km) up the Little River in South Carolina, at normal pool elevation of 330 mean sea level, Thurmond Lake comprises nearly 71,100 acres (287 km^{2}) of water with a shoreline of 1,200 miles (1,900 km). The entire Thurmond "project" contains 151,000 acres (611 km^{2}) of land and water.

J. Strom Thurmond Lake and Dam is the first Corps of Engineers project to be built in the Savannah River Basin. Hartwell Lake and Dam the second project built in the basin was completed in 1963, and a third project, Richard B. Russell Lake and Dam was completed in 1985. Together these three lakes form a chain of lakes that is 120 miles (190 km) long. Congress authorized Thurmond Lake in 1944 and construction began in 1946. The project was completed in 1954 at a cost of $79 million.

== History ==
Due to a clerical error in the original Congressional Authorization, the project was officially authorized to build "Clark Hill Dam", creating "Clark Hill Lake", with the "s" at the end of "Clarks" accidentally omitted. The authorization document outlined the plan of development for the basin with authorized purposes of power production, incidental flood control, and navigation. Later, recreation, water quality, water supply, and fish and wildlife management were added as authorized purposes. Twenty-six years after the construction of the dam, both the dam and lake were renamed to "Clarks Hill Dam" and "Clarks Hill Lake", respectively, in legislation sponsored by Strom Thurmond.

The 1966 Flood Control Act authorized the building of Trotters Shoals Lake and Dam on the Savannah River between Clarks Hill Lake and Hartwell Lake. This lake was later renamed to commemorate a late senator from Georgia, Richard B. Russell, who was an important supporter of building dams on the river. This created a movement to rename Clarks Hill Lake after J. Strom Thurmond, the longest-serving senator in US history, who was from Edgefield on the South Carolina side of the lake. This movement gained support due to the senator's popularity in the area, and in 1988 the project was congressionally renamed "J. Strom Thurmond Dam and Lake at Clarks Hill."

== Renaming of lake ==
Until 1987, the lake was called Clarks Hill Lake after the nearby South Carolina town of Clarks Hill named for Augusta businessman John Mulford Clark (1813–1880). (See "Years Gone By: Information on the Origin of the Names Clarks Hill," Reservoirs—Clarks II Subjects, DOC-1991, Georgia Archives, Morrow.) On December 3, 1987, two days before long-time South Carolina Senator Strom Thurmond's 85th birthday, Representative Butler Derrick of South Carolina introduced a bill before Congress to rename the lake after Thurmond.

The bill quickly passed through Congress and was signed into law by President Ronald Reagan on December 23, 1987. Many residents of both states were upset by the sudden change of name of the lake and the dam, which had not been open to public comment. In response, a group of Georgia legislators, led by Representative Doug Barnard, Jr. (who was the only Georgia co-sponsor of the original 1987 bill) introduced a federal bill to rename the lake as "Clarks Hill" once again. That bill, however, was unsuccessful, and the name remained unchanged.

On April 4, 1989, the State of Georgia legislature passed House Resolution No. 115 making "Clarks Hill" the official state name for both the dam and associated reservoir. Accordingly, Georgia's state map still refers to the lake as Clarks Hill. Many residents of Georgia as well as South Carolina still refer to the lake by its original name.

== See also ==
- List of dams and reservoirs in Georgia
- List of dams and reservoirs in South Carolina
