= Price–Legg Bridge =

- Coordinates: 33°41′35″N 82°20′19″W
- Carries: SR 47
- Crosses: Little River
- Locale: Lincoln–Columbia county line southeast of Lincolnton

The Price–Legg Bridge is a bridge over the Little River along the Lincoln–Columbia county line southeast of Lincolnton, in the U.S. state of Georgia. It carries SR 47.

A project to replace the original bridge, which was deemed "structurally deficient", was scheduled to be completed in April 2016. There is no indication as to whether the new bridge will retain the "Price–Legg Bridge" name.

The Price–Legg Bridge was built at about the same time as the reservoir, and much of the rock used in its causeway was quarried nearby.

== History ==
The bridge first opened in 1952, it was named after Homer Legg, a judge in Lincoln County and J.M. Price, who was a manager of a gristmill in the area. In September 2011, the Georgia Department of Transportation reported plans to replace the bridge in 2014 in favor of a newer one. The new bridge would be placed 50 feet (15 m) from the existing bridge.

== Dimensions ==
The bridge has a clearance height of 10 feet (3.0 m).

== Replacement plans ==
In the early part of the 21st century, the bridge, which is the only direct land-based connection between Columbia and Lincoln counties, was determined to have experienced deterioration due to meteorological conditions and heavy traffic loads. At that time, it was discovered to be "structurally deficient". However, the bridge was not found to be in danger of collapse; just that cracks were found during inspection. In 2014, the bridge's condition was revamped to only be "functionally obsolete". The replacement project has been tallied at a $24.1 million price tag. The new bridge was scheduled to be completed by August 21, 2016. As of February 24, 2015, construction was 18 percent complete.

A study that was conducted by the United States Army Corps of Engineers determined that the project would not have a significant effect on recreation activities. However, bank fishing would be hampered.

In February 2013, a GDOT report classified the old bridge as "fracture critical". This was after some boats that were too tall for its 14.5-foot-high (4.4 m) overhead clearance collided with the bridge. These collisions left only one bolt holding a torn connection plate in place. The bridge has been inspected on a regular basis. Traffic has been reduced from two lanes to one, from 7 a.m. to 5 p.m. to work on the new bridge The lane closures were expected to last about three months.

Four foundational piers have been built. The new bridge is planned to have two travel lanes, two emergency lanes, and a 30-foot-high (9.1 m) vertical clearance. This is compared to the current bridge's 10 feet (3.0 m). The new bridge is planned to be built only about a few hundred feet from the old one, and on the southwest side, nearer the Little River than Clarks Hill Lake.

The old bridge was scheduled to be demolished when the new one is completed.

== See also ==
- Central Savannah River Area
