= Richard B. Russell Dam =

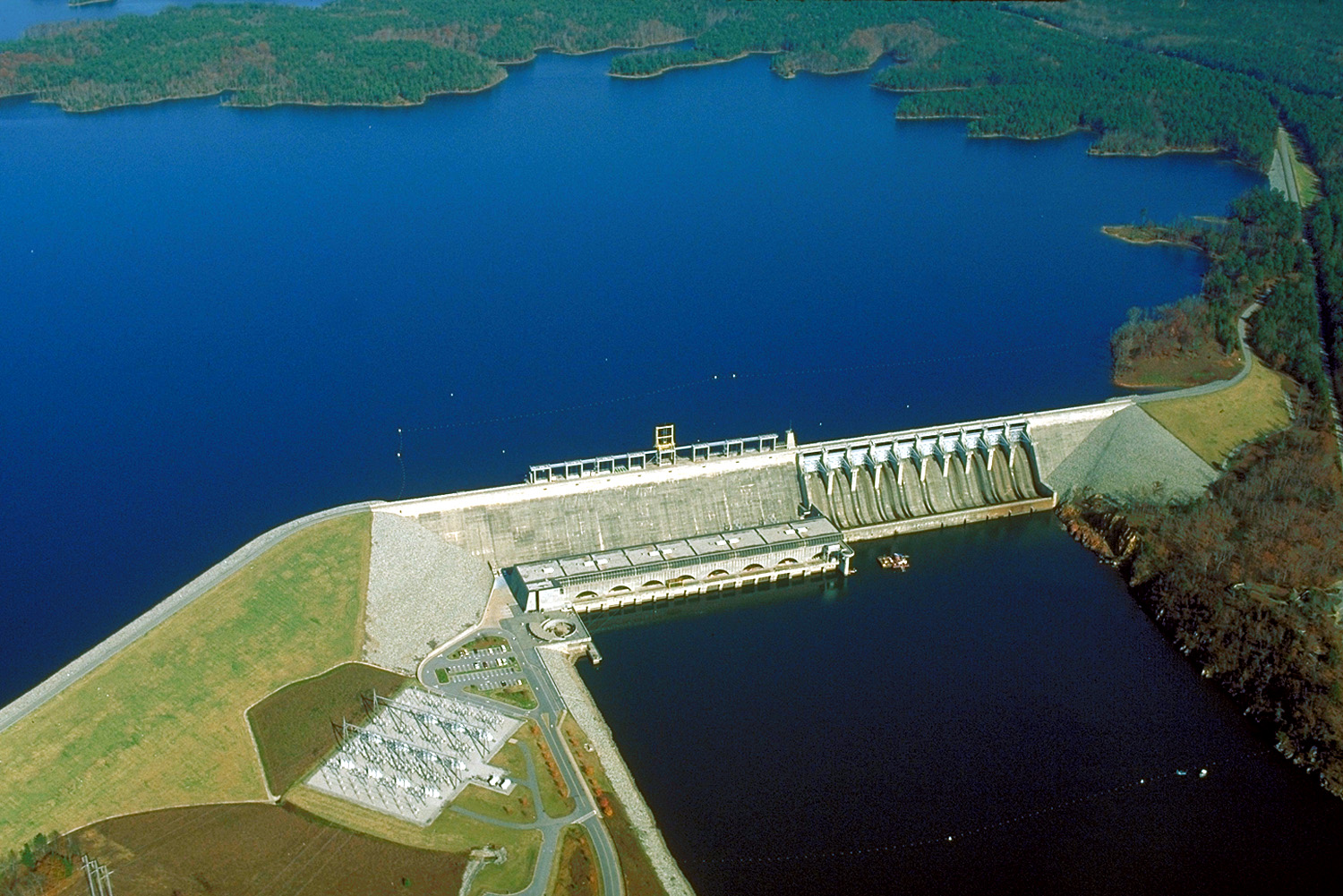
- Richard B. Russell Dam
- Location: Abbeville County, South Carolina / Elbert County, Georgia, USA
- Coordinates: 34°01′30″N 82°35′39″W
- Construction began: 1974
- Opening date: 1985
- Construction cost: $626 million USD
- Operator(s): U.S. Army Corps of Engineers

Dam and spillways
- Type of dam: Embankment, concrete-gravity
- Impounds: Savannah River
- Height: 210 ft (64 m) (thalweg)
- Length: .98 mi (1.58 km)

Reservoir
- Creates: Richard B. Russell Lake
- Catchment area: 2,890 sq mi (7,500 km^{2})
- Surface area: 26,650 acres (10,780 ha)

Power Station
- Type: Pumped-storage
- Turbines: 8 total: 4 x 75 MW (101,000 hp), 4 x 75 MW reversible
- Installed capacity: 600 MW (800,000 hp)
- Annual generation: 465.5 GWh (1,676 TJ)

Richard B. Russell Dam is a concrete-gravity and embankment dam located on the Savannah River at the border of South Carolina and Georgia, creating Richard B. Russell Lake. The dam was built by the U.S. Army Corps of Engineers between 1974 and 1985 for the purposes of flood control, hydroelectricity, recreation, additional stream flow regulation, water supply, and fish and wildlife management. The concrete structure of the dam spans 1,904 feet (580 m) and rises 210 feet (64 m) above the riverbed, housing a hydro-power plant with an installed 600 megawatts (800,000 hp) capacity. The Richard B. Russell Dam is the final large dam completed by the U.S. Army Corps in the Savannah River Basin and lies 30 miles downstream from the Hartwell Dam (1962) and 37 miles (60 km) upstream from the J. Strom Thurmond Dam (1954).

== History and construction ==
The Flood Control Act of 1966 authorized construction of a new reservoir on the Savannah River to be named Trotters Shoals Lake and Dam. The lake and dam were renamed in 1987 after Georgia senator Richard Brevard Russell Jr. in the same bill that also renamed Clarks Hill Lake to Lake Strom Thurmond. Construction on the new dam began in 1974 and filling of the lake began in October 1983. The lake reached full pool in December 1984 and the original power plant of four 75 megawatts (101,000 hp) conventional turbine-generators went online in January 1985. In 1992, the addition of four 75 MW reversible pump-turbine units was completed, giving the dam a pumped-storage hydroelectricity capability.

== Dam characteristics ==
The dam has a total length of 5,224 feet (1,592 m) with its concrete section making up 1,904 feet of that length. The concrete section is flanked on both sides by earthen-embankment dams that total 3,320 feet (1,010 m) long. The concrete section houses the power plant and spillway of the dam. The spillway contains ten-50 by 45 feet (15 m × 14 m) tainter gates that help regulate the reservoir level along with controlling flooding.

== Power plant ==
The powerhouse is 690 feet (210 m) long and contains eight 75 MW generators. Four generators are conventional turbines and another four are reversible turbines. With the four-reversible turbines, the dam can be used for pumped-storage hydroelectricity by pumping water that is discharged downstream back into the reservoir; essentially reusing water.

Since the Russell Dam is primarily a peaking facility, the reversible pump-turbines pump water from the backwaters of Lake Thurmond into Lake Russell during off-peak hours when electricity is cheap and demand is low. During periods of high power demand, the water is released to generate electricity. Power produced by the dam is managed by the Southeastern Power Administration.
