= Hartwell Lakeside Park =

Park in Hartwell, Georgia, United States

- Hart Park
- Location within Georgia Location within the United States
- Type: Natural park
- Location: 330 Hart Park Road, Hartwell, GA, 30643, US
- Coordinates: 34°22′35″N 82°54′38″W
- Area: 147 acres (59 ha)
- Designer: Army Corps of Engineers
- Operator: City of Hartwell
- Website: gastateparks.org/Hart

Hartwell Lakeside Park, formerly known as Hart State Park, is a 147 acres (59 ha) park in Hartwell, in northeast Georgia. The park is named after the American Revolutionary War heroine Nancy Hart, who lived in the Georgia frontier, and it was her devotion to freedom that has helped make her name commonplace in the Georgia upcountry.

This recreation area is used by the community for swimming, boating, water skiing and water sports in general, and fishing on Lake Hartwell, and for hiking and biking on a 1.5 miles (2.4 km) trail. Hart Park also offers a playground for children and a self-registration campground, which is opened seasonally from March 15 until September 15.

== History ==
In April 2020, management of the park passed from the Georgia Department of Natural Resources to the City of Hartwell. In June 2020, a groundbreaking ceremony was officially held for the renamed Hartwell Lakeside Park.

== Facilities ==
- 78 tent, trailer, RV campsites
- 16 walk-in campsites
- 5 cottages (closed)
- swimming beaches (seasonal)
- 3 picnic shelters
- cricket theater - music programs
