= Richard B. Russell Lake =

Man-made lake created by the construction of Richard B. Russell Dam in South Carolina

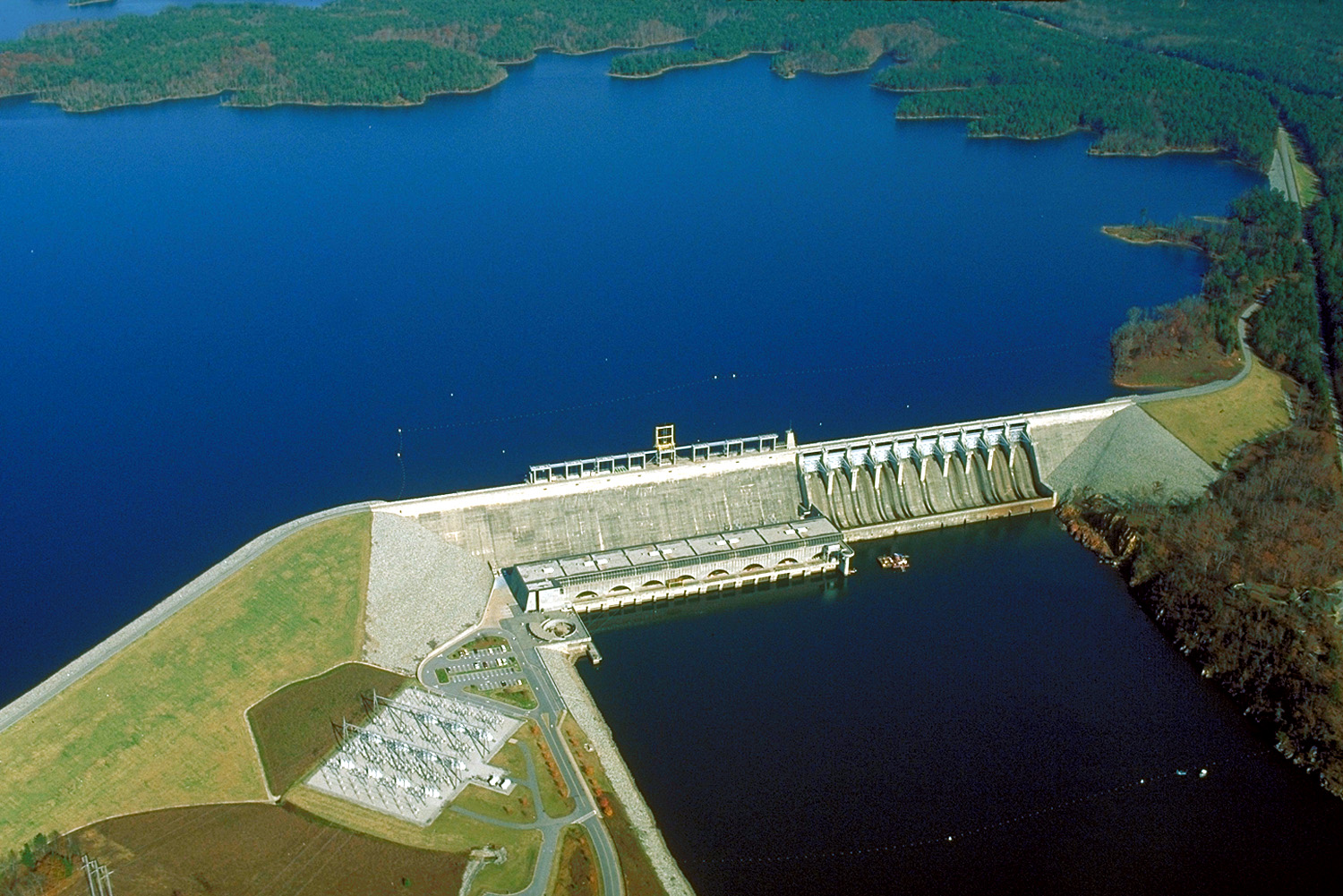
- Richard B. Russell Dam

- Location within Georgia Location within the United States
- Location: Georgia / South Carolina
- Coordinates: 34°05′30″N 82°37′48″W
- Type: reservoir
- Primary inflows: Savannah River
- Primary outflows: Savannah River
- Basin countries: United States
- Surface area: 26,650 acres (108 km^{2})
- Max. depth: 167 ft (51 m)
- Shore length^{1}: 540 mi (870 km)
- Surface elevation: 475 ft (145 m)
- ^{1} Shore length is not a well-defined measure.

Richard B. Russell Lake (known to locals as simply "Lake Russell") is a reservoir created by the U.S. Army Corps of Engineers by construction of Richard B. Russell Dam on the Savannah River bordering Elbert County, Georgia and Abbeville and Anderson counties in South Carolina. The lake impounds primarily the Savannah River but also includes Beaverdam Creek on the Georgia side and Rocky River on the South Carolina side. Filling of the lake began in October 1983, and was completed in December 1984 for a full pool elevation of 475 feet (145 m). Lake levels do not change much because the lake is designed to operate within 5 feet (1.5 m) of full pool compared to Hartwell and Thurmond, whose 35 feet (11 m) and 18 feet (5.5 m) of conservation storage respectively causes their levels to change more dramatically. This causes the lake to always look full.

Named for U.S. Senator Richard Brevard Russell, Jr., the lake consists of 26,650 acres (108 km^{2}) of water and 540 miles (870 km) of shoreline. Unlike its neighbors Lake Hartwell to the north and Lake Strom Thurmond to the south, federal regulations prohibit private use of the public lands surrounding Lake Russell.

== Archaeology ==
The area flooded by the lake covered several areas of archaeological significance. There was a significant effort to explore and excavate these sites before filling the lake. Sites include Millwood Plantation, Fort Independence and a Native American village and mound.

The lake also covered the historic Georgia-Carolina Memorial Bridge which was not demolished but remains intact beneath the lake.

== Recreation ==
Since it was constructed after 1974, the Corps of Engineers prohibits exclusive private use of the lake's shoreline. As a result, the shoreline of the lake is almost completely undeveloped with the exception of some state parks and day-use areas. The Corps owns a 300-foot (91 m) buffer zone all the way around the 540 miles (870 km) of shoreline to mitigate the loss of habitat due to the creation of the lake. The natural shoreline creates a strikingly different feel and look to the lake when compared to Thurmond and Hartwell which have highly developed shorelines.

== See also ==
- List of lakes in South Carolina
- Lake Hartwell
- Lake Strom Thurmond
