= J. Strom Thurmond Dam =

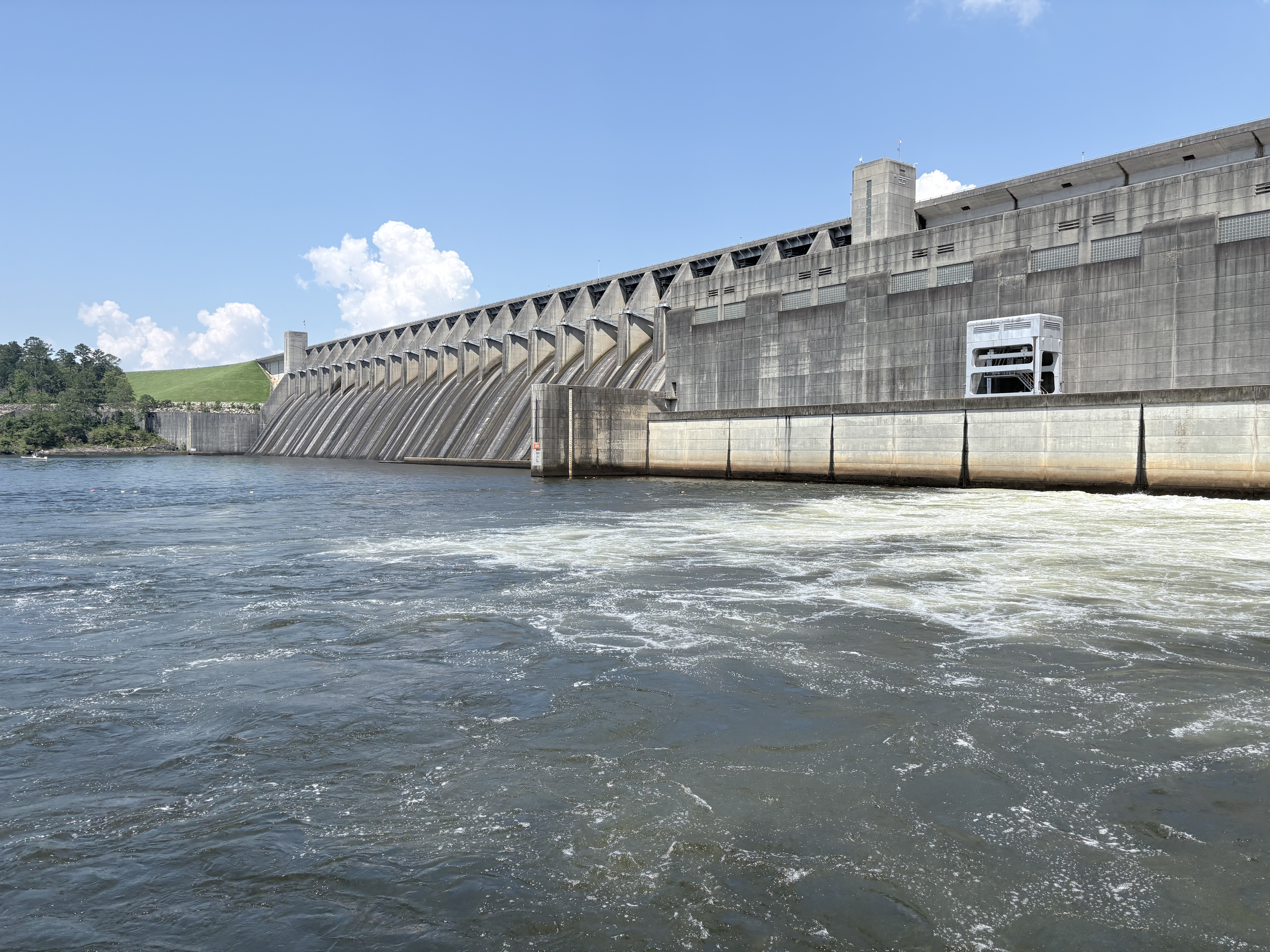
- J. Strom Thurmond Dam
- Interactive map of J. Strom Thurmond Dam
- Location: US 221 / SR 150, Columbia County, Georgia / McCormick County, South Carolina, USA
- Coordinates: 33°39′39″N 82°11′59″W
- Construction began: 1946
- Opening date: 1954
- Construction cost: $78.5 million
- Operator: U.S. Army Corps of Engineers

Dam and spillways
- Impounds: Savannah River
- Height: 200 feet (61 m) (thalweg)
- Length: 1 mile (1.73 km)

Reservoir
- Creates: Lake Strom Thurmond
- Catchment area: 6,144 mi^{2} (15,910 km^{2})
- Surface area: 71,100 acres (28,800 ha)

Power Station
- Turbines: 7
- Installed capacity: 380 MW
- Annual generation: 700,000,000 kWh annually

J. Strom Thurmond Dam, also known in Georgia as Clarks Hill Dam, is a concrete-gravity and embankment dam located 22 miles (35 km) north of Augusta, Georgia on the Savannah River at the border of South Carolina and Georgia, creating Lake Strom Thurmond. U.S. Route 221 (and Georgia State Route 150 on the Georgia side of the state line) cross it. The dam was built by the U.S. Army Corps of Engineers between 1946 and 1954 for the purposes of flood control, hydroelectricity and downstream navigation. The concrete structure of the dam spans 1,096 feet (334 m) and rises 204 feet (62 m) above the riverbed, housing a power plant with an installed 380 MW capacity. The Dam has prevented over $3.1 million in estimated flood damage annually and also provides recreation, water quality, water supply, along with fish and wildlife management.

Since 1988, the official name of the dam is after Strom Thurmond, a longtime Senator. Originally accepted in Georgia, the dam is named after revolutionary war hero, Elijah Clark, who is also buried on the western banks of the lake on acreage that is now Elijah Clark State Park and Recreation Area. The USACE developed the Christopher D. Spiller pollinator trail in the site of housing for workers during the construction of the dam. They are also helping restore the longleaf pine on the site and around the dam which includes Piedmont prairie and longleaf pine habitat.

== History and construction ==
In 1890, Lieutenant Oberlin M. Carter of the U.S. Army Corps of Engineers (USACE) Savannah Office issued a survey report that recommended the construction of dams on the Savannah River in order to prevent flooding in Augusta, Georgia. His report was overlooked until the 1927 Rivers and Harbors Act allowed the USACE to investigate development of the Savannah River for the purpose of hydroelectricity, navigation, flood control and irrigation. In 1933, the USACE completed the report for the entire Savannah River Basin that recommended against government flood control development of the basin but did propose two hydropower dams in the upper Savannah Basin, the Clark Hill and Hartwell Dams.

Construction on the Clarks Hill project was not authorized until 1944 by the 78th Congress and prior efforts by local leaders in Augusta were instrumental in gaining approval. Support from the USACE along with Georgia Senators Walter F. George and Richard Russell and Georgia Congressman Paul Brown were important towards getting President Franklin D. Roosevelt's blessing in a 1935 plan. Roosevelt ordered a feasibility study to be done on the Clark Hill Project amongst other dams in the plan. The results were sent back to the President in 1937 and other reviews were conducted until focus on the Second World War slowed the approval process. The next comprehensive study on the Upper Savannah Basin was not completed until 1943 but the project was authorized by Congress with Public Law 534 in 1944. A clerical error at the time named the project "Clark Hill" instead of "Clarks Hill". The final report on the Upper Savannah Basin was issued in 1946 and initial construction began soon thereafter on August 1.

Construction was at first ceased until November 1946 as President Harry S. Truman had halted funding for many government programs in order to handle a post-Second World War depressed economy. In 1947, diversion of the Savannah River and construction of a coffer dam began while the contract for the actual dam was awarded. The construction plant for the dam was also completed in 1947, containing equipment to create concrete that would be transported anywhere on the construction site via three-revolving gantry cranes with 124 ft. booms. In 1948, after the foundation was excavated, workers began to pour concrete on site for the spillway. In 1949, initial work on the concrete spillway was completed; the original coffer dam was removed and a second cofferdam was installed in order to restore the flow of the Savannah River to its original channel but now through eight-sluice gates in the spillway structure. Concrete operations on the main part of the dam had halted in 1949 because of a steel-strike but resumed in 1950 and much of the spillway was completed by the end of the year.

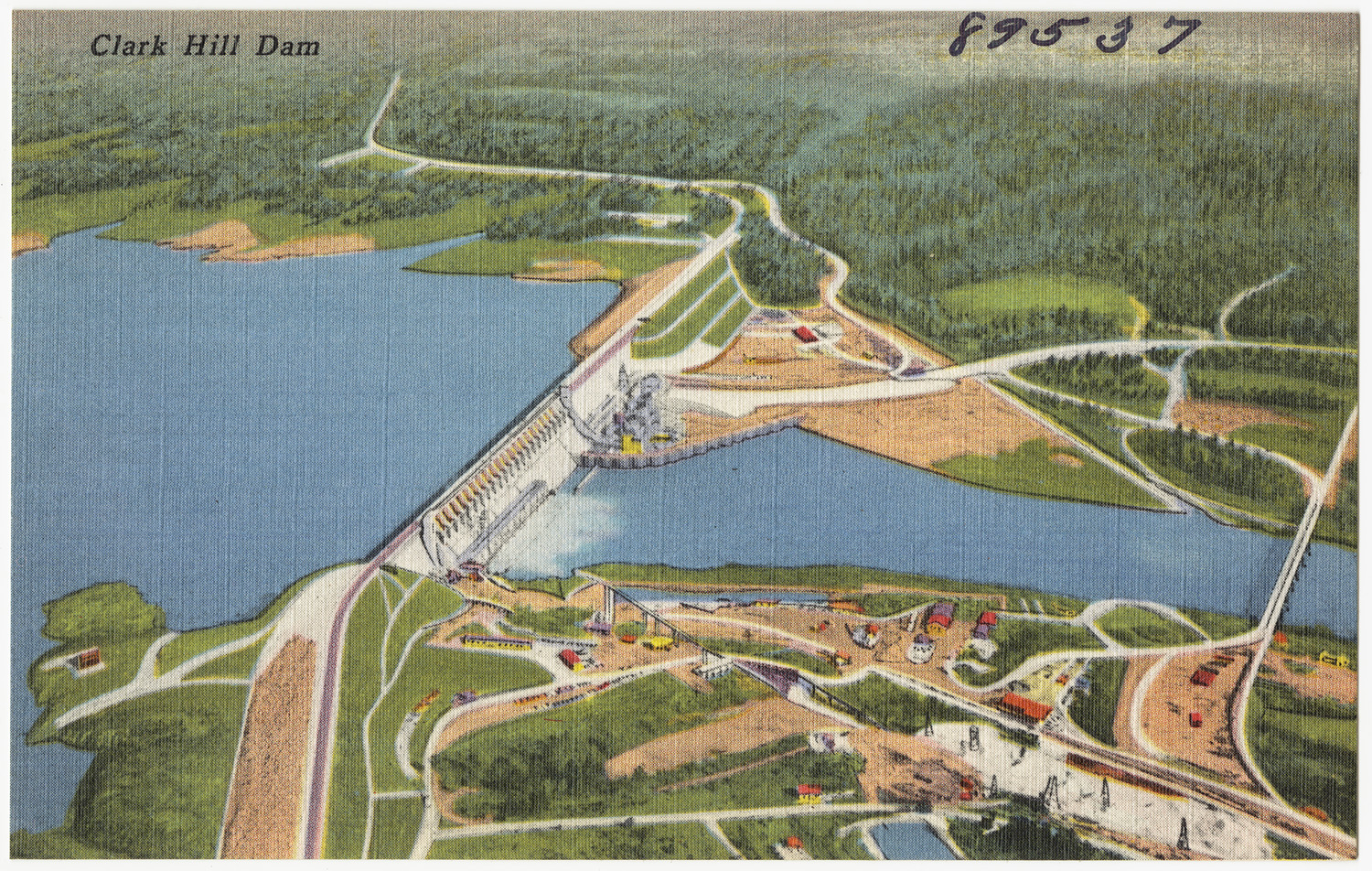
postcard of the (then) Clarks Hill Dam complex

In late 1950, contracts for construction of the powerhouse were awarded and the contracts for the 7 generators had been awarded a year prior. Construction on the powerhouse would lag initially because materials were needed for the Korean War but by July 1952, 60% of the powerhouse was complete. Each generator required for the power house needed 32 railcars to transport on site. By July 1951, the reservoir began to fill as most of the embankment part of the dam was complete and filling would finish in October 1952. By November 1952, the first generator was operating and began transferring power to South Carolina early the next year. The six remaining generators went online between 1953 and 1954. The project was completed at a cost of US $78.5 million compared to the estimated cost of US $35.3 million in 1944.

Since completion, the J. Strom Thurmond dam has prevented an estimated $185,000 annually in flood damages. In one specific case, the dam decreased the height of the March 1964 flood from 38 feet (12 m) to 25 feet (7.6 m) at Augusta, where the flood stage is 32 feet (9.8 m). The dam also helps maintain the 9-foot (2.7 m) navigation channel near Augusta along with reducing silt in the channel by 22%.

=== Construction obstacles ===
The USACE encountered several problems when constructing the Clark Hill project. The most serious was a conflict with the Savannah River Electric Company (SREC) over the power rights of the Clark Hill project. The SREC had acquired a permit from the Federal Power Commission in 1928 to construct, own and operate a hydroelectricity dam at the Clark Hill site. In 1932, the SREC surrendered the license because of conditions imposed by the Great Depression and a subsequent low-demand for electricity. While the USACE and officials from Georgia were negotiating a plan for the dam in the mid-to-late 1930s, the SREC assured them that they would not interfere. However, during the short construction halt in late 1946, the SREC did in fact reapply for the license. In 1947, the Federal Power Commission denied the SREC the license but the company gained support from Michigan Representative George A. Dondero who was the chairman of the U.S. House Committee on Public Works and Transportation. Dondero introduced a bill that would allow the USACE to build the dam's embankment and allow SREC to build, own and operate the powerhouse. The bill was defeated and SREC announced it would no longer fight for the Clark Hill project or any other Savannah River Basin projects.

=== Dam naming controversy ===
Until 1988, the dam was called Clarks Hill Dam. In 1987, however, the U.S. Congress passed a South Carolina-sponsored bill to rename the dam and lake after Strom Thurmond, a long-time segregationist Senator from South Carolina. In response, a group of Georgia legislators introduced an eventually unsuccessful bill to rename the lake as "Clarks Hill" once again. On April 4, 1989 the State of Georgia legislature passed House Resolution No. 115 making "Clarks Hill" the official state name for both the dam and associated reservoir.

== Dam and power plant characteristics ==
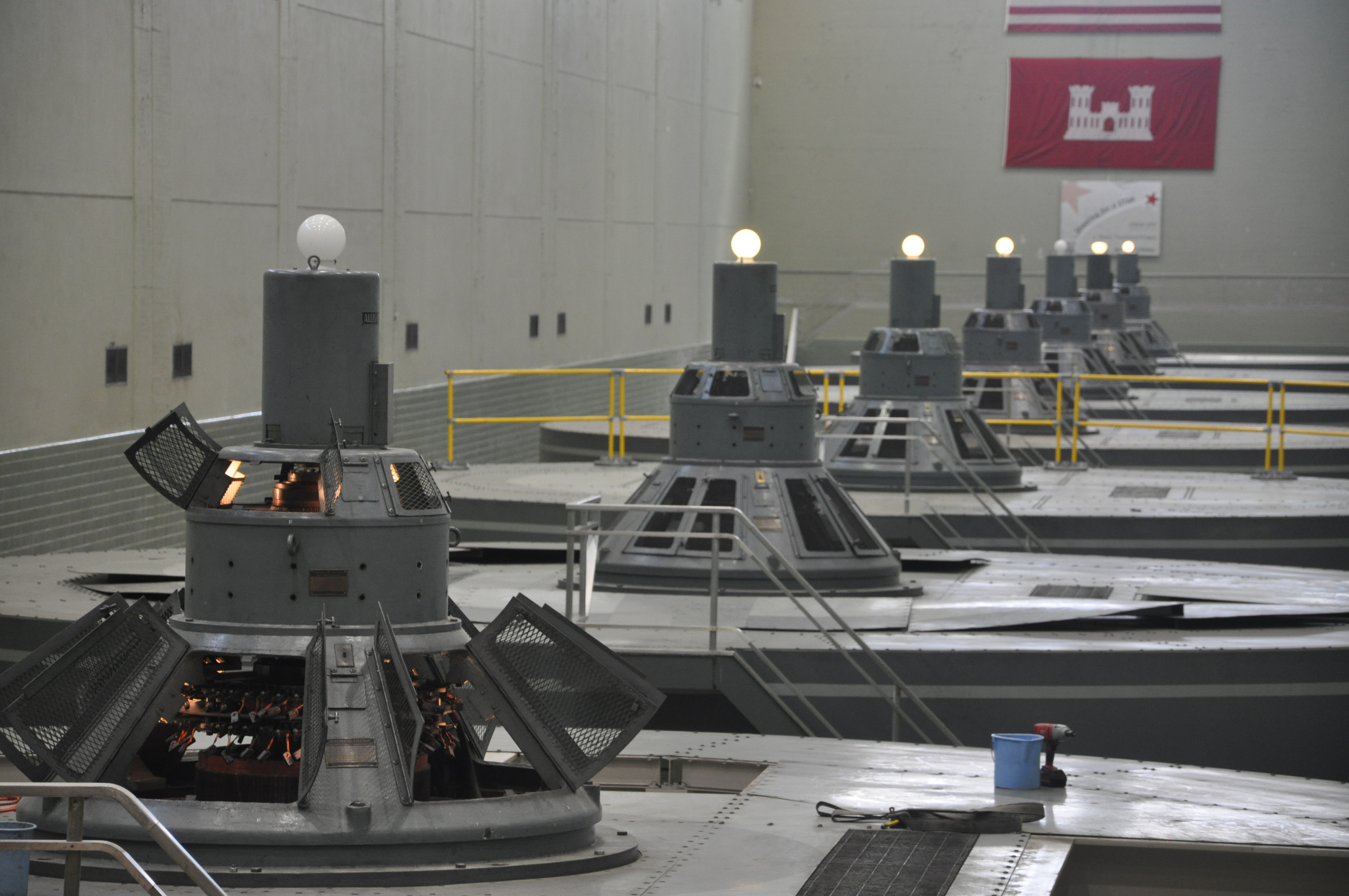
Power plant

The J. Strom Thurmond Dam's power-house is a concrete-gravity structure that is flanked by embankment dams for a total length of one mile. The concrete section is 1,096 feet (334 m) long and is 200 feet (61 m) high from the Savannah's thalweg. The dam created the 71,000-acre (29,000 ha) Lake Strom Thurmond which stretches 29.4 miles (47.3 km) up the Savannah River and 17 miles (27 km) up the Little River. The dam is 239.5 miles (385.4 km) upstream of the Savannah's mouth and combines with the Hartwell Dam (1962) and the Richard B. Russell Dam (1985) in order to form over 120 miles (190 km) of lakes.

The dam helps provide electricity during peak-hours with seven 40-MW hydroelectricity generators. Each turbine weighs 300 tons and has a 30-foot (9.1 m) diameter. The generators are fed with water by seven 214-foot (65 m), 20-inch-wide (510 mm) penstocks, and the dam's spillway contains 23 tainter gates that help maintaining a normal 330 ft MSL lake elevation and flooding. The dam's 700,000,000 kW·h annual production of electricity is managed by the Southeastern Power Administration

Electricity from the dam is marketed by the Southeastern Power Administration.

== In popular culture ==
The dam was featured in multiple films of the Hunger Games franchise.

== See also ==
- List of dams and reservoirs in Georgia
- List of dams and reservoirs in South Carolina
