= Southeastern Power Administration =

Regional power administration of the U.S. Department of Energy

The Southeastern Power Administration is a United States Power Marketing Administration with responsibility for marketing hydroelectric power from 22 water projects operated by the U.S. Army Corps of Engineers in the states of West Virginia, Virginia, North Carolina, South Carolina, Georgia, Florida, Alabama, Mississippi, Tennessee and Kentucky.

Southeastern was created in 1950 by the Secretary of the Interior to carry out functions assigned to the Secretary by the Flood Control Act of 1944. In 1977, it was transferred to the United States Department of Energy when that department was created.

The agency is headquartered in Elberton, Georgia. It markets electric power to nearly 500 wholesale customers, including electrical cooperatives, government-operated electric distributors and investor-owned utilities in Virginia, North Carolina, South Carolina, Georgia, Florida, Alabama, Mississippi, Tennessee, Kentucky, and southern Illinois.

The objectives of Southeastern are to market electric power and energy generated by the Corps projects at the lowest possible cost to consumers, while recovering the Federal government's costs. Public bodies and cooperatives receive preference in the sale of power. One of the agency's main responsibilities is to design, formulate, and justify rate schedules that are sufficient to repay the Federal government's costs for power production and transmission, including amortization of the Federal investment. Southeastern does not own transmission facilities and must contract with other utilities to provide transmission.

Southeastern's annual revenue from the sale of hydroelectric power is about US$200 million, as of 2009.

== Dams ==
Mobile District

- Allatoona Dam, Buford Dam, Carters Dam, West Point Dam, Walter F. George Dam, Robert F. Henry Dam, Jim Woodruff Dam, and Millers Ferry Dam

Nashville District

- Barkley Dam, Cheatham, Old Hickory Dam, J. Percy Priest Dam, Center Hill Dam, Dale Hollow Dam, Wolf Creek Dam, Laurel Dam

Savannah District

- Hartwell Dam, Richard B. Russell Dam, J. Strom Thurmond Dam

Wilmington District

- John H. Kerr Dam and Philpott Dam

== See also ==
- Power Marketing Administration
