= Lake Hartwell =

Reservoir on the Georgia/South Carolina border, United States

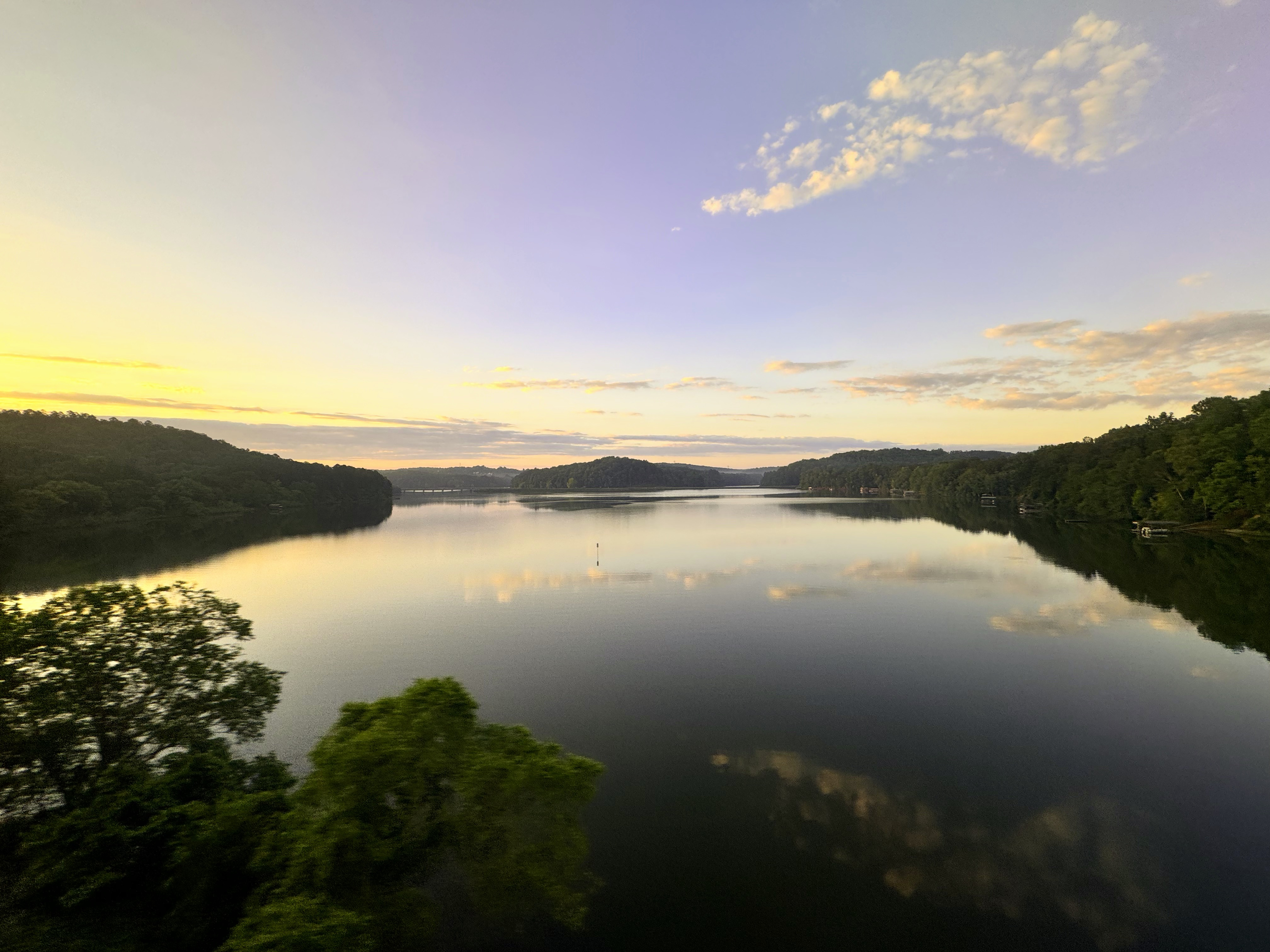
- The lake as seen from Amtrak's Crescent

- Location within South Carolina
- Location: Georgia / South Carolina
- Coordinates: 34.45°N 82.85°W
- Type: Reservoir
- Primary inflows: Savannah, Tugaloo, and Seneca Rivers
- Primary outflows: Savannah River to Lake Russell
- Basin countries: United States
- Surface area: 56,000 acres (23,000 ha)
- Average depth: 45 ft (14 m)
- Max. depth: 185 ft (56 m)
- Water volume: 2,550,000 acre⋅ft (3.15 km^{3})
- Shore length^{1}: 962 mi (1,548 km)
- Surface elevation: 660 ft (201 m)
- ^{1} Shore length is not a well-defined measure.

Lake Hartwell is a man-made reservoir bordering Georgia and South Carolina and encompassing parts of the Savannah, Tugaloo, and Seneca Rivers. Lake Hartwell is one of the largest recreation lakes in the Southeastern United States. It was created by the construction of the Hartwell Dam, completed in 1962 and located on the Savannah River seven miles (11 km) below the point where the Tugaloo and Seneca Rivers join to form the Savannah. Extending 49 miles (79 km) up the Tugaloo and 45 miles (72 km) up the Seneca at normal pool elevation, the lake comprises nearly 56,000 acres (230 km^{2}) of water with a shoreline of 962 miles (1,548 km). The entire Hartwell reservoir project contains 76,450 acres (309.4 km^{2}) of land and water. Interstate highway 85 bisects Lake Hartwell, making the area easily accessible to visitors.

== Background ==
The Flood Control Act of May 17, 1950, authorized the Hartwell Dam and Reservoir as the second unit in the comprehensive development of the Savannah River Basin. Its estimated cost was $68.4 million based on 1948 price levels and preliminary designs. The original project provided for a gravity-type concrete dam 2,415 feet (736 m) long with earth embankments at either end, which would be 6,050 feet (1,840 m) long on the Georgia side and 3,935 feet (1,199 m) long on the South Carolina side. The 12,400-foot-long (3,800 m long) dam was to be topped with a roadway 24 feet (7.3 m) wide. The main dam was to consist of two non-overflow concrete sections on the right and left banks 887 feet (270 m) and 940 feet (290 m) long, respectively; a gravity-type concrete spillway 588 feet (179 m) long equipped with 12 tainter gates 26 by 40 feet (7.9 by 12.2 m) in the channel; and a powerhouse on the South Carolina side of the river. Full-power pool was designed to be 660 feet (200 m) above mean sea level.

At this elevation, the reservoir would extend 7.1 miles (11.4 km) up the Savannah River to the confluence of the Tugaloo and Seneca Rivers; 41 miles (66 km) up the Tugaloo to within about 2 miles (3.2 km) of the existing Yonah Dam; 27 miles (43 km) up the Seneca to the mouth of the Little River, South Carolina; 2 miles (3.2 km) up the Little River to the Newry site; and 7 miles (11 km) up the Keowee to the Old Pickens site. The reservoir would cover 56,500 acres (22,900 ha) and would involve the relocation of three sections of railroad totaling 2 miles (3.2 km), the raising of two railroad bridges, construction of six sections of new state highways, totaling 19.6 miles (31.5 km), and 9 sections of county roads totaling 12.7 miles (20.4 km); the construction of 9 new bridges and the raising of four existing bridges, and the relocation of two power transmission lines.

Construction of the Hartwell project started in 1955 and was completed in 1963. Construction of the dam started in 1955 and was finished in 1959. Salvage archeological excavations were conducted at several sites in an effort to recover artifacts and information from prehistoric and historic sites that would be inundated by the lake. Joseph Caldwell led a team from the University of Georgia in this work, especially from 1957 to 1959. Lake Hartwell is named for the American Revolutionary War figure Nancy Hart. Nancy Hart lived in the Georgia frontier, and was known for her devotion to freedom. A county, city, lake, state park, and highway among others, bear her name.

=== Droughts and water levels of Lake Hartwell ===
In 1989, the lake first hit level 3, dropping to its lowest level during the drought that year; 2008 was the second time the lake hit level 3. In December 2008, due to severe drought in the Southeastern United States, the lake dropped to more than 22 feet (6.7 m) below its normal water level. This revealed old highways that were typically under water, exposed islands that are usually topped with buoys to warn boaters, and left some boat shells sitting on dry land.

The lake reached its lowest level, 637.49 feet (194.31 m), on December 9, 2008. The highest lake elevation was 665.4 feet (202.8 m), reached on April 8, 1964. Overall, the average lake elevation is 657.5 feet (200.4 m). As of October 1, 2010, the lake had returned to just over 654 feet (199 m). This rebound in lake level is due to releases from the lake being suspended for a month ending April 10, 2009, in an effort to return Lake Hartwell to normal elevations.

=== Early lake history ===
The area around Lake Hartwell has a rich history of indigenous settlement, dating to before the Mississippian culture period, which began about 800 CE. Numerous villages and platform mounds were built by people of that culture, along the upper tributaries of the Savannah River, such as the Chauga, Tugaloo, and Seneca Rivers.

The Cherokee Indians settled throughout much of this Piedmont and mountainous area, declaring it their homeland. Initial relations with colonists were through trading, but after the Revolutionary War, European-American settlers increasingly encroached on Cherokee territory. They have since named many streams, rivers, and recreation areas after the historic Cherokee and Muscogee Creek, who were among the Five Civilized Tribes removed from the Southeast under President Andrew Jackson in the 1830s.

Other historic figures who lived around this area were Andrew Pickens and John C. Calhoun, both statesmen from South Carolina. Botanist William Bartram traveled the area recording vegetation types and plant species.

=== Challenges to construction ===
In August 1956, Eliza Brock and her daughter refused to allow workmen to come on their property to begin clearing for the reservoir area. The government had gained ownership of 103 acres (42 ha) of land in June 1956, but apparently Brock never received the offer for her land. After an October 1956 federal ruling, Brock settled on accepting $6,850 (equivalent to $81,118 in 2025) for her property.

In late 1956, Clemson College objected to damage that would be done to its property as a result of the impounded water in the reservoir. For instance, plans would cause the flooding of their Memorial Stadium. After countless meetings, Clemson finally settled with the government, agreeing to two diversion dams to be built in the vicinity of Clemson College to rechannel the Seneca River around its property.

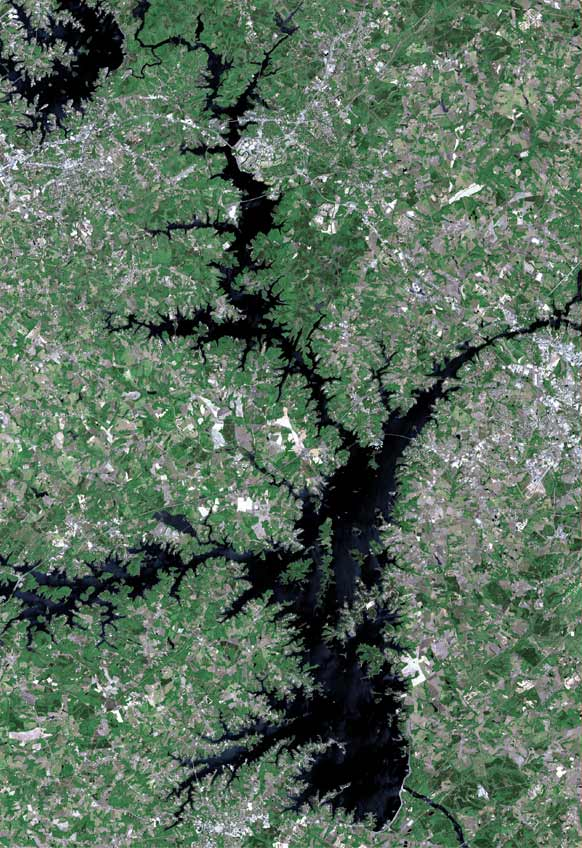
Hartwell Lake map

== Fishing ==
Since its construction, Hartwell Reservoir has provided good fishing habitat for many species. Bluegill, catfish, smallmouth bass, walleye, and largemouth bass are naturally occurring species in the lake, with quality fishing available for those species. The most popular fishing on Lake Hartwell, however, has been of striped bass which are also known as rock fish and normally a saltwater fish, were discovered able to survive in fresh water after the construction of a dam on the Santee-Cooper system in lower South Carolina trapped many striped bass. Striped bass were eventually introduced to the three lower Savannah River System lakes: Hartwell, Russel, and Thurmond. Fish heavier than 60 pounds (27 kg) have been caught on Lake Hartwell, with 20-pound (9.1 kg) fish being common. The majority of striped bass caught on the lake will range from 5 to 12 pounds (2.3 to 5.4 kg).

== Recreation ==
- Camping: Nine campgrounds at Lake Hartwell have a total of 524 campsites.
- Trails: A 7.6-mile (12.2 km) trail is in the Paynes Creek Campground area.
- Fishing: Many fish species inhabit Lake Hartwell, making recreational fishing popular.
- Swimming: the lake is considered suitable for swimming despite over 200 deaths occurring on the lake.
- Water sports: Activities such as wake boarding and water skiing are permitted on the lake.
- Boating: Five marinas are along the lake, with many public boat ramps.
- Wildlife: More than 250 species of birds and 40 different mammals are found around Lake Hartwell.

== Places to visit ==
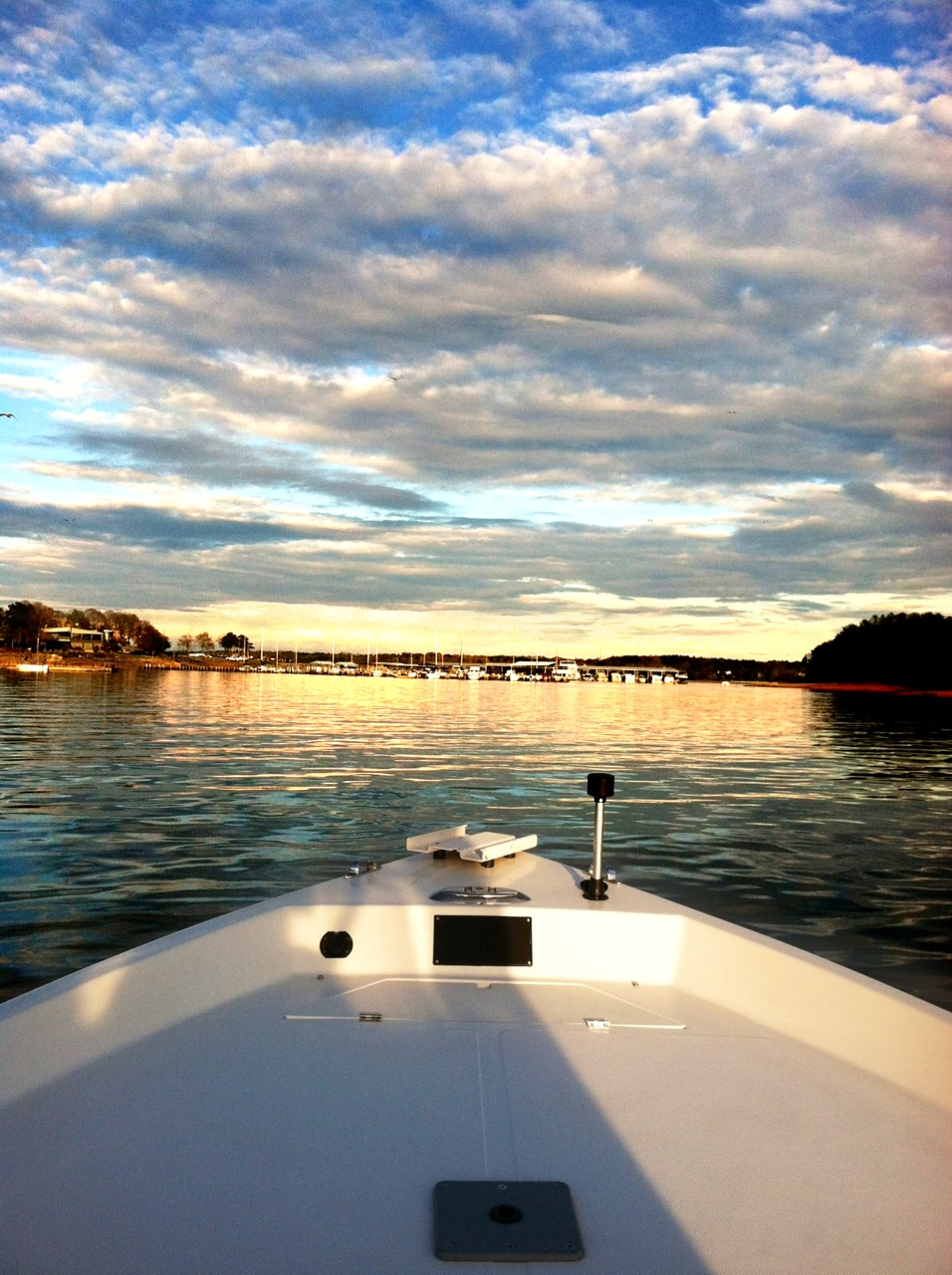
Sunset on the Lake with Portman Shoals Marina in the distance

- Issaqueena Dam, located along the Keowee River past Clemson, has a scenic waterfall about 25 feet tall and 150 feet wide, carrying overflow from Lake Issaqueena into Lake Hartwell. The waterfall is posted with danger signs, as some deaths have occurred here.
- Eighteen Mile Creek is a curvy and narrow waterway off the Seneca River at buoy marker S-42. It is well known by fishermen and birders. The creek extends about five miles, ending in a big shallow area with an old bridge. It is a site of many birds and wildlife.
- Rock Quarry has many overhanging rocks, whose height seems to change with varying lake levels. Some areas within this cove are shallower than others.
- Ghost Island, at its center high point, has 50 old grave headstones; some cannot be read. Some above-ground concrete vaults are marked, identifying the graves from the War of 1812. Others are from the 1700s. Many people camp on this island unaware of their "company".
- Andersonville Island: Andersonville, South Carolina was once a well-known port and resort town. It had a barge system with daily service to Savannah, Georgia. It flourished for years, attracting both industry and tourists. Andersonville was said to be as large as Anderson or Pendleton, both also in South Carolina. Today, it survived only as a large island, nearly 400 acres. It is the largest island on the lake, and is between two and three miles long. A paved road across the island is overgrown. Visitors can explore building ruins, artifacts, rare plants, and wildlife.

== See also ==
- List of lakes in South Carolina
