= Wahachee Creek =

Stream in Georgia, U.S.

Coordinates: 33°58′47.43″N 82°44′33.50″W

Wahachee Creek is a stream in the U.S. state of Georgia. It is a tributary to the Broad River.

Wahachee is a name derived from the Muskogean language meaning "mighty wolf". A variant name is "Wahatchee Creek".
