= Savannah River =

River in the southeastern United States

Savannah River Tugaloo River
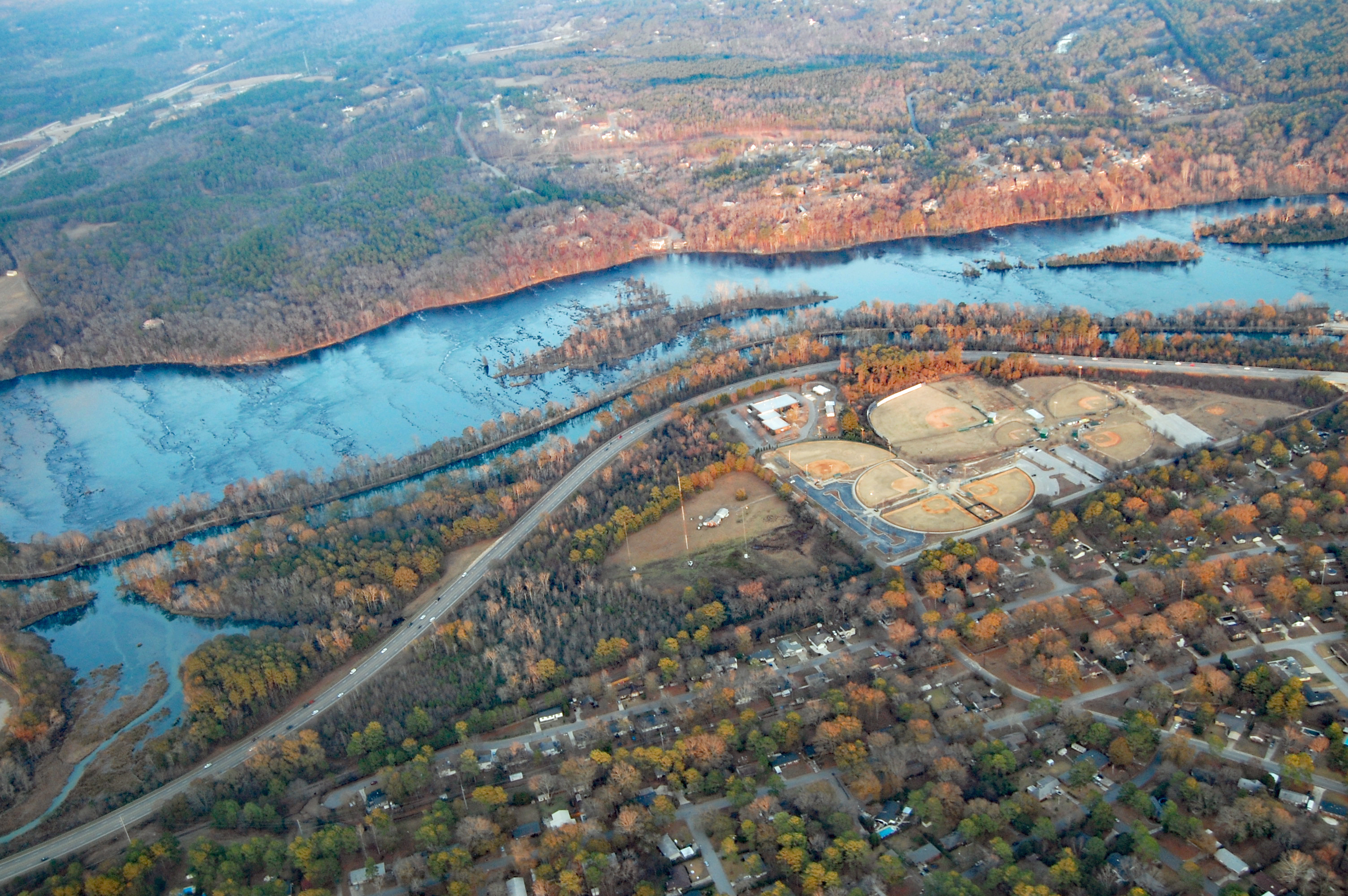
- Savannah River at Augusta, with the Augusta Canal running alongside

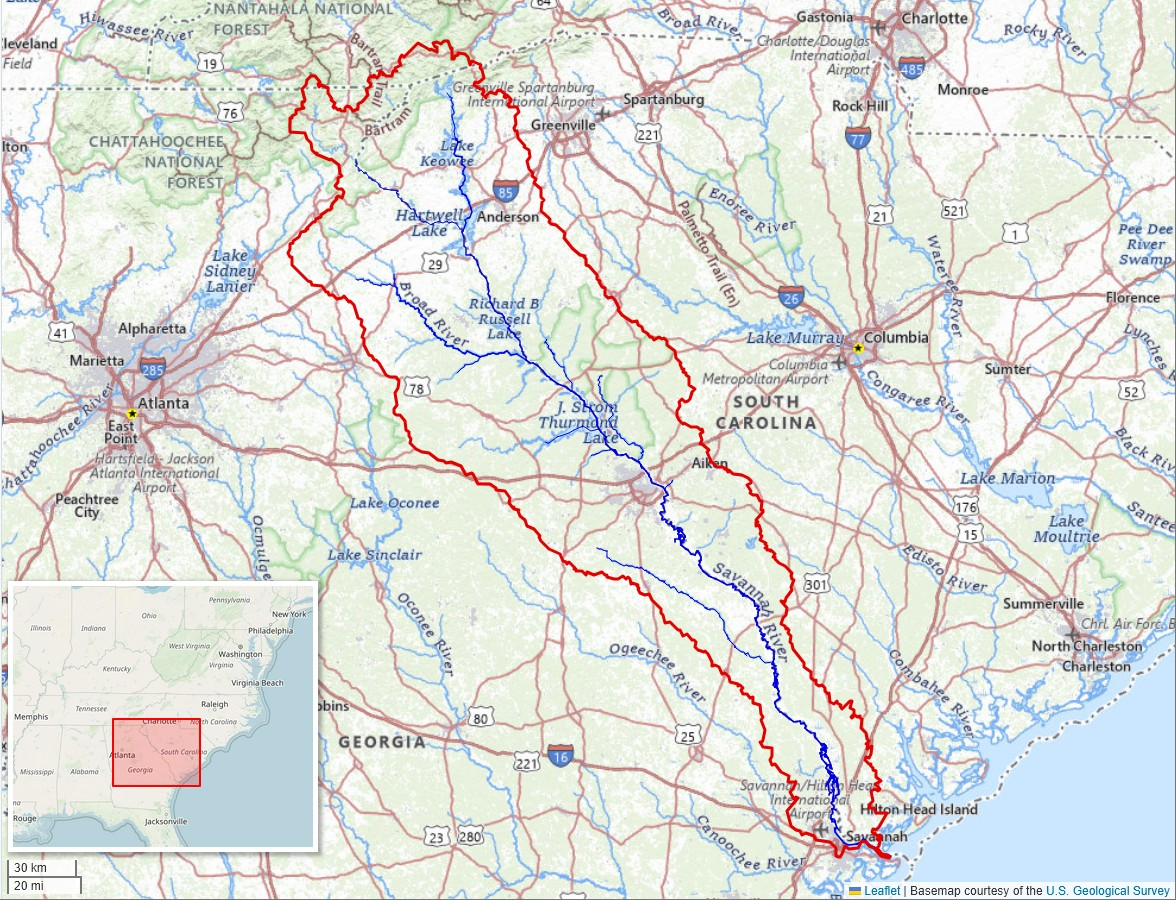
- Savannah River watershed (Interactive map)

Location
- Country: United States
- State: North Carolina, South Carolina, Georgia
- Cities: Savannah, Augusta

Physical characteristics
- Source: Lake Hartwell
  - coordinates: 34°26′37″N 82°51′22″W
  - elevation: 655 ft (200 m)
- Mouth: Atlantic Ocean
  - location: Tybee Roads
  - coordinates: 32°2′16″N 80°51′0″W
  - elevation: 0 ft (0 m)
- Length: 301 mi (484 km)
- Basin size: 9,850 sq mi (25,500 km^{2})
- Discharge
  - location: near Clyo, GA
  - average: 11,720 cu ft/s (332 m^{3}/s)

Basin features
- Tributaries
  - left: Seneca River
  - right: Tugaloo River

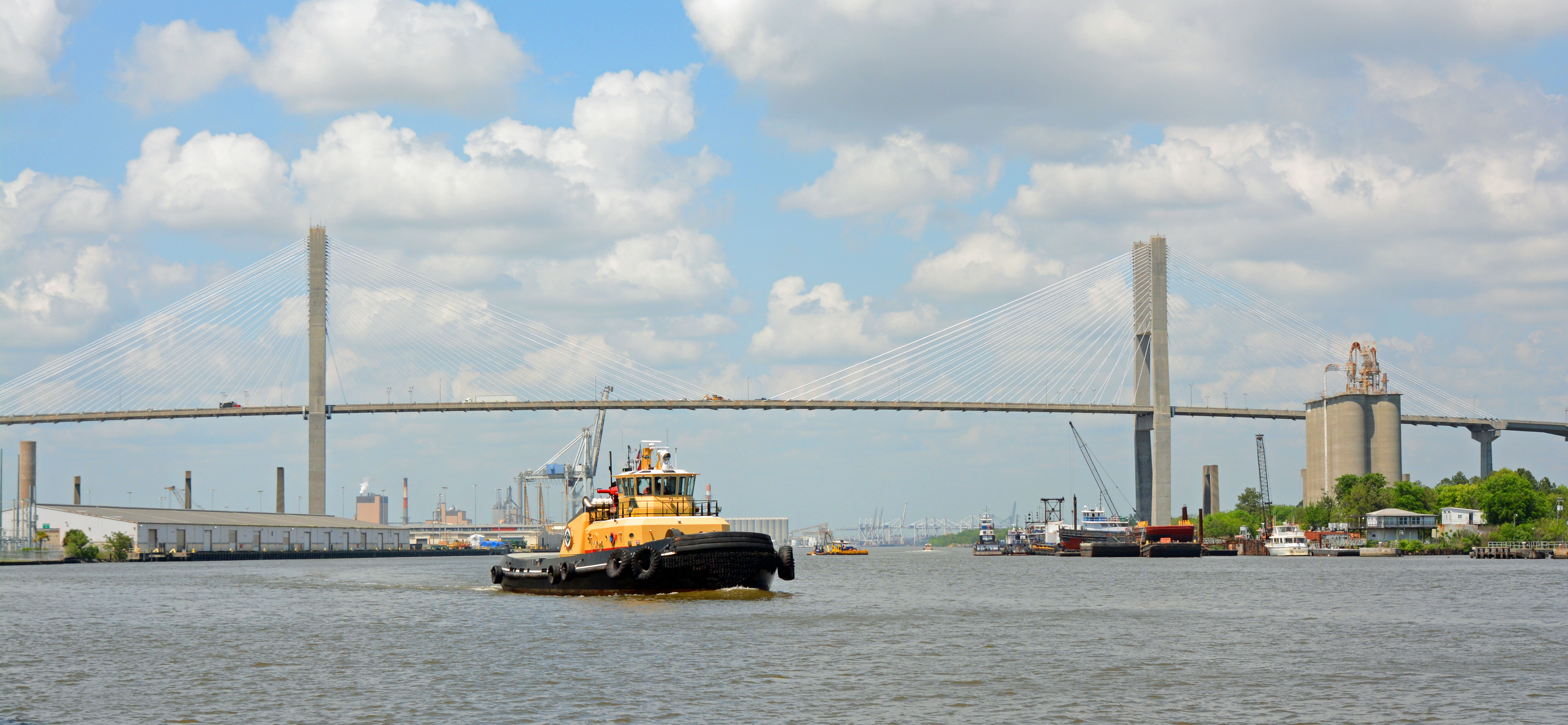
Talmadge Memorial Bridge in Savannah

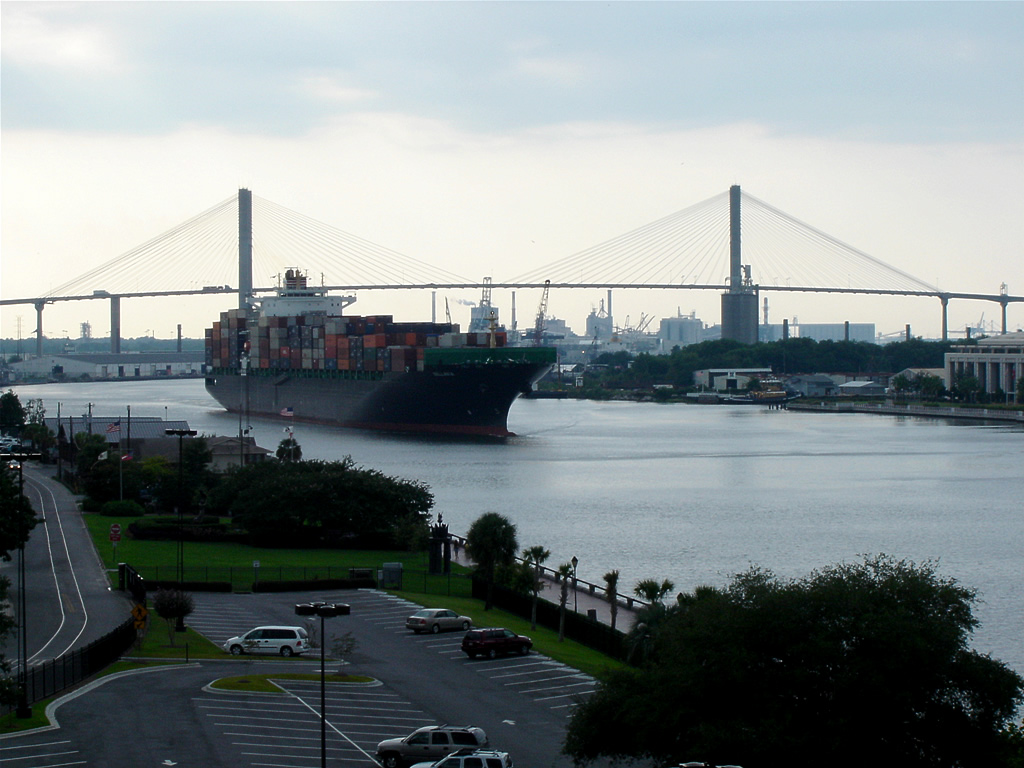
A cargo ship navigates the narrow channel at Savannah

The Savannah River is a major river in the Southeastern United States, forming most of the border between the states of Georgia and South Carolina. The river flows from the Appalachian Mountains to the Atlantic Ocean, for a total distance of about 301 miles (484 km). The Savannah was formed by the confluence of the Tugaloo River and the Seneca River. Today this confluence is part of Lake Hartwell, a man-made reservoir constructed between 1955 and 1964.

Two tributaries of the Savannah, the Tugaloo River and the Chattooga River, form Georgia's northernmost border with South Carolina. A tributary of the Tugaloo, the Tallulah River, forms the northwest branch of the Savannah and features the two-mile-long (3 km) and almost 1,000-foot-deep (300 m) Tallulah Gorge. The Savannah River's drainage basin extends into the southeastern Appalachian Mountains and the state of North Carolina, and is bounded by the Eastern Continental Divide.

Two major cities in Georgia are located along the Savannah River: Savannah and Augusta. Founded in 1733 and 1736, respectively, they were nuclei of early English settlements during the colonial period of American history.

The Savannah River is tidal at the city of Savannah. Downstream from the city, the river broadens into an estuary before flowing into the Atlantic Ocean. The area where the river's estuary meets the ocean is known as Tybee Roads. The U.S. Intracoastal Waterway flows through a section of the Savannah River near the city proper.

== Name ==
The name "Savannah" comes from a group of Shawnee who migrated to the Piedmont region in the 1680s. They destroyed the Westo and occupied established Westo lands at the Savannah River's head of navigation on the Fall Line. Present-day Augusta developed nearby. These Shawnee were called by several variant names, which all derive from their native name, Ša·wano·ki (literally, "southerners"). The local variants included Shawano, Savano, Savana, and Savannah.

Another theory is that the name was derived from the English term "savanna", a kind of tropical grassland, which was borrowed by the English from Spanish sabana and used in the colonial southeast. The Spanish word was borrowed from the Taíno word zabana. Other theories interpret the name Savannah to have come from Atlantic coastal tribes, who spoke Algonquian languages. These have similar terms meaning "southerner" or perhaps "salt".

Historical and variant names of the Savannah River, as listed by the U.S. Geological Survey, include May River, Westobou River (for the Westo tribe), Kosalu River, Isundiga River, and Girande River, among others.

== History ==
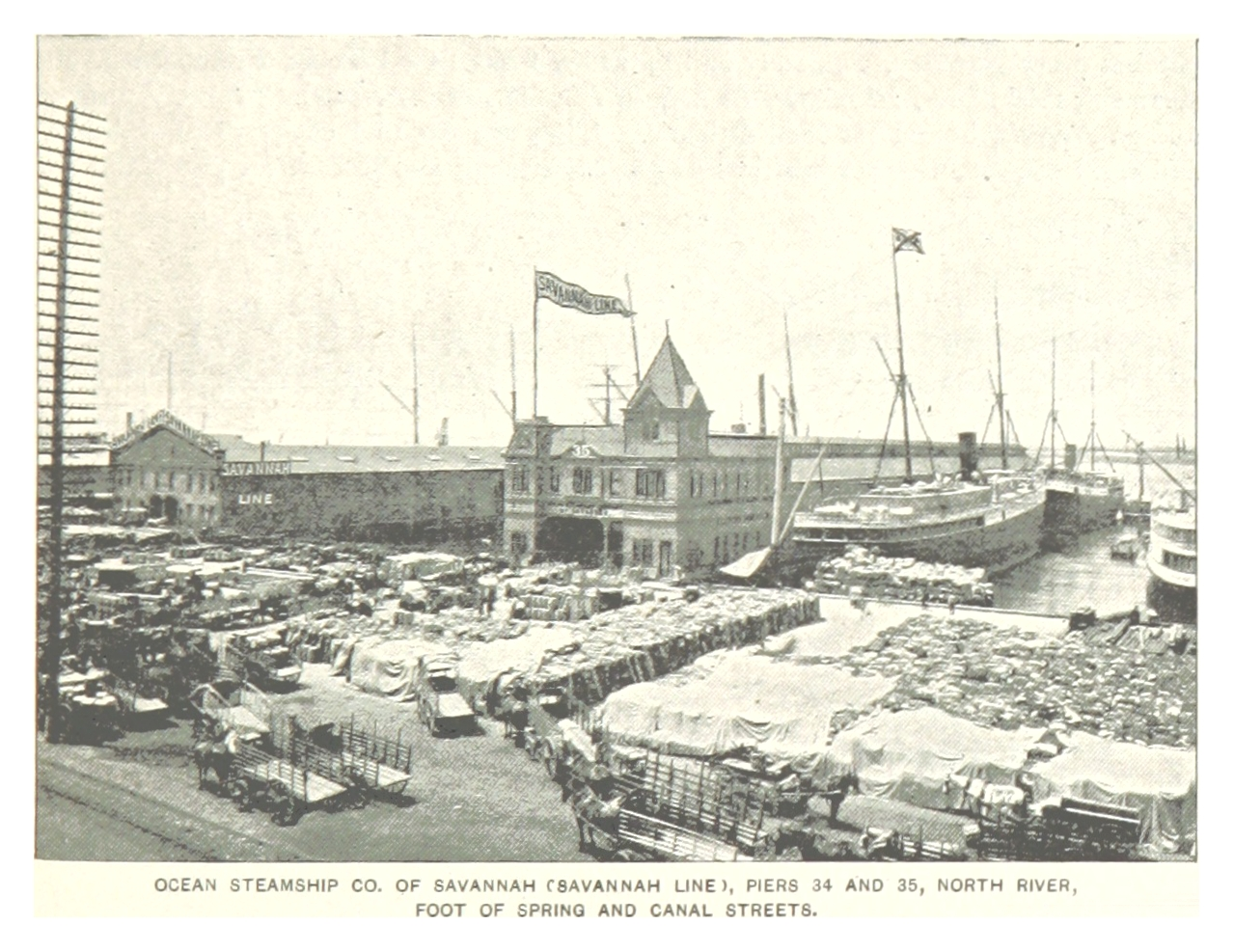
Ocean Steamship Company (Savannah Line), piers 34 and 35, at the foot of Spring and Canal Streets, 1893.

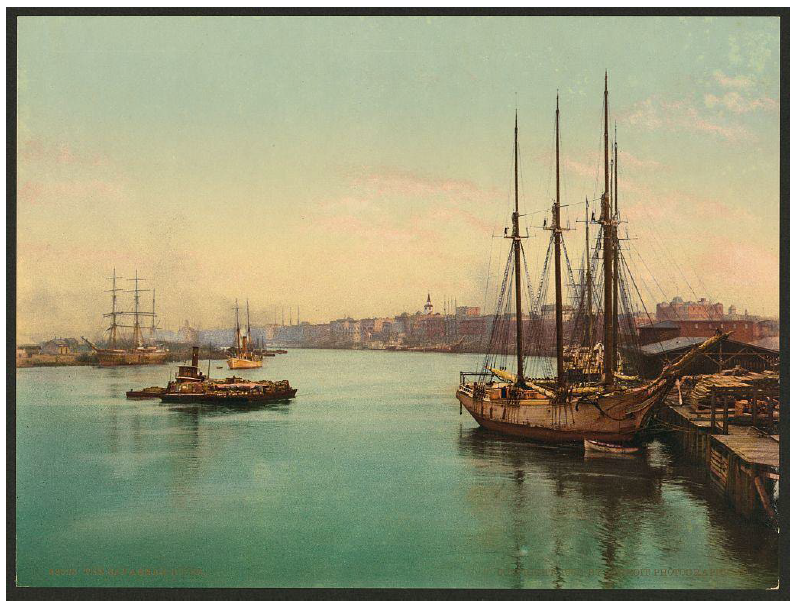
A post card of the Savannah River, ca. 1900.

=== Early history ===
The river's banks have long been inhabited by various Native American nations and during the Mississippian period it was one of the most densely populated regions. However, due to escalating conflict between the Micoships of Ocute and Cofitachequi the river and surrounding areas became so depopulated it became known as the Wilderness of Ocute. In the 1600s the Westo are thought to have migrated from the northeast, pushed out by the Haudenosaunee Confederacy, who were engaging in their own expansionist campaign. This migration, beginning in the late 16th century, resulted in the Westo Indians reaching the present area of Augusta, Georgia, in the late 17th century. Their slave raids combined with outbreaks of European diseases from Spanish expeditions such as those of Hernando de Soto destroyed the already declining polities of Ocute and Cofitachequi creating a regional power vacuum.

The Westo used the river for fishing and water supplies, for transportation, and for trade. They were strong enough to hold off the Spanish colonists making incursions from Spanish Florida. The Carolina Colony needed the Westo alliance during its early years. When Carolinians desired to expand their trade to Charleston, they viewed the Westo tribe as an obstacle. In order to remove the tribe, they sent a group called the Goose Creek Men to arm the Savanna (also known as the Savannah) Indians, a Shawnee tribe, who defeated the Westo in 1680.

Following this, the English colonists renamed the river as the Savannah; it was integral to early development. They founded two major cities on the river during the colonial era: Savannah was established in 1733 as a seaport on the Atlantic Ocean, and Augusta is located where the river crosses the Fall Line of the Piedmont, at the headwaters of the navigable portion of the river downstream to the ocean. The two cities on the Savannah served as Georgia's first two state capitals. In the 19th century, the sandy river channel changed frequently, causing numerous steamboat accidents.

During the American Civil War, President Abraham Lincoln proclaimed a blockade around the Confederate States of America, forcing merchantmen to use specific ports along the coast best suited for this purpose. The harbor at Savannah became one of the busiest ports for blockade runners bringing in supplies for the Confederacy until it was cut off by the reduction of Fort Pulaski and Union capture of Cockspur Island.

The South Carolina-Georgia border was originally defined in the Treaty of Beaufort in 1787, which, among other things, "[reserved] all islands in [the river] to Georgia". Over time, new islands were created. Some, namely the Barnwell islands, are on the South Carolina side of the original line. In 1990, the U.S. Supreme Court decided that the new islands on the South Carolina side of the border belong to South Carolina.

=== 20th century to present ===
Between 1946 and 1985, the U.S. Army Corps of Engineers built three major dams on the Savannah for hydroelectricity, flood control, and navigation. The J. Strom Thurmond Dam (1954), the Hartwell Dam (1962), and the Richard B. Russell Dam (1985) and their reservoirs combine in order to form over 120 miles (190 km) of lakes. In December 1986, an oil spill caused by an oil tanker docked at the port of Savannah resulted in approximately 500,000 US gallons (1,900,000 L) of fuel oil leaking into the river.

During the 1950s, the Savannah River Plant was constructed across 310 square miles of land on the South Carolina bank of the river northeast of Augusta, Georgia, displacing the residents of several small towns near the Savannah River. The site produced plutonium, tritium, and heavy water for the United States Atomic Energy Commission's nuclear weapons program. The facility, now called the Savannah River Site and operated by the U.S. Department of Energy, still plays an important role in the economy of the Augusta metropolitan area. Three of the site's five production reactors as well as its coal power plant discharged waste heat to the Savannah River via Pen Branch, Steel Creek, and Beaver Creek while two reactors discharged heat to the man made PAR Pond on Lower Three Runs Creek. The Savannah River Plant also produced the majority of the Atomic Energy Commission's heavy water supply by processing water from the Savannah River via the Girdler sulfide process. Heavy water was used as the moderator for the site's production reactors. In 1956 Clyde L. Cowan and Frederick Reines first detected neutrinos with an experiment carried out at the Savannah River Plant P-Reactor.

During their operating lifetimes, the Savannah River Plant's reactors significantly elevated the temperatures of several Savannah River tributaries. Since these reactors predate nuclear power generation and were some of the earliest large reactors in the world, this offered unique opportunities for the Savannah River Ecology Laboratory to study the impact of large-scale thermal discharge and other effects of the site's operation. Efforts to remediate the thermal discharge directly to the river, such as the construction of a lake to receive the discharge of L-Reactor and cooling tower to dissipate the discharge of K-Reactor had been recently implemented by the time the reactors were shut down at the end of the Cold War. The Savannah River Site now extracts tritium, but using targets irradiated at the Watts Bar Nuclear Plant in Tennessee, so the heat discharge associated with tritium production is no longer in the Savannah River basin.

The Vogtle Electric Generating Plant was constructed across the river from the Savannah River Plant, with units 1 and 2 completed in mid 1980s and units 3 and 4 completed in the early 2020s. This plant also requires water from the river, but all four units use large natural draft cooling towers to avoid large scale withdrawals or discharge. The McIntosh Combined Cycle Power Plant and Jasper Generating Station are situated further down the Savannah River which provides feed water for the mechanical draft cooling towers for their combined cycle natural gas plants.

== Course ==
The Savannah River flows through a variety of climates and ecosystems during its course. It is considered an alluvial river, draining a 10,577-square-mile (27,390 km^{2}) drainage basin and carrying large amounts of sediment to the ocean. At its headwaters in the Blue Ridge Mountains, the climate is quite temperate. The river's tributaries receive a small amount of snow-melt runoff in the winter. The majority of the river's flow through the Piedmont region is dominated by large reservoirs. Below the Fall Line, the river slows and is surrounded by large blackwater bald cypress swamps. Numerous oxbow lakes mark the locations of old river channels, which have shifted course because of earthquakes and silting.

Another prominent feature are the numerous large bluffs that line the river in some locations. Most notable of these is Yamacraw Bluff, the location selected to build the city of Savannah. The river becomes a large estuary at the coast, where fresh- and saltwater mix. River dredging operations to maintain the Port of Savannah have caused the estuary zone to move further upstream than its historical home. This is causing the rare freshwater marshland to be taken over by saltwater spartina marsh.

Tributaries include:

- Black Creek
- Brier Creek
- Broad River
- Chattooga River
- Ebenezer Creek
- Knoxboro Creek
- Little River
- Rocky River
- Seneca River
- Tugaloo River

== Ecology ==
The Savannah River Basin in the Southeast region of the U.S. has been experiencing environmental change from anthropocentric activities. The Savannah River has the fourth-highest toxic discharge in the country, according to a 2009 report by Environment America. The conversion of the vegetation cover, including the urban growth, agriculture expansion, and deforestation and reforestation take place throughout the basin, especially near the lakes and tributary waters in the middle and lower Savannah Basin. The continuous change of land use such as the conversion of forest areas to other types of land cover and vice versa can significantly lead to increasing threats to the environmental systems of the region.

The river supports a large variety of native and introduced aquatic species:

- Upper section - yellow perch, brook trout, brown trout, rainbow trout, smallmouth bass, largemouth bass, crappie, striped bass, hybrid striped bass, white bass, bluegill, North American river otter, American mink, North American beaver, catfish
- Middle section - largemouth bass, crappie, striped bass, spotted bass, bluegill, redbreast sunfish, catfish, American eel, North American river otter, American mink, North American beaver, shortnose sturgeon, chain pickerel, bowfin, longnose gar, snapping turtles, American alligator, water moccasin
- Lower section, estuary - largemouth bass, crappie, striped bass, spotted bass, bluegill, redbreast sunfish, catfish, American eel, North American river otter, American mink, North American beaver, shortnose sturgeon, Atlantic sturgeon, chain pickerel, bowfin, longnose gar, snapping turtles, American alligator, snakes, red drum, flounder, spotted seatrout, bull shark, tarpon, common bottlenose dolphin, West Indian manatee, diamondback terrapin

The river is one of only four in the southeast with significant populations of Hymenocallis coronaria, the shoals spider-lily. It has three populations in the primary river basin and one each in the tributaries of Stevens Creek in South Carolina and the Broad River in Georgia.

== Navigation ==
Through the building of several locks and dams in the first half of the 20th century (such as the New Savannah Bluff Lock and Dam, completed in 1937 during the Great Depression), and upstream reservoirs like Lake Hartwell, the Savannah River was once navigable by freight barges between Augusta, Georgia (on the Fall Line) and the Atlantic Ocean. Maintenance of this channel for commercial shipping ended in 1979, and the one lock below Augusta has been deactivated.

When a large piece of equipment (a deaerator) needed to be delivered to the Vogtle Electric Generating Plant construction site in 2013, the barge travelled upstream from the Port of Savannah only to the Georgia Power's Plant McIntosh site, near Rincon, Georgia; from there, the cargo was moved by a road transporter.

=== Crossings ===
This is a list of crossings of the Savannah River.

Crossing	Carries	Location	Image
=== Front River ===
Talmadge Memorial Bridge	US 17 / SR 404 Spur	Savannah, Georgia and South Carolina	
Houlihan Bridge	SC 170 / SR 25	Port Wentworth, Georgia and South Carolina	
=== Back River ===			
=== Savannah River ===			
Seaboard Coastline Railroad Bridge	CSX Transportation	Savannah, Georgia and South Carolina	
Interstate 95 Bridge	I-95	Savannah, Georgia and Hardeeville, South Carolina	
Georgia Highway 119 Bridge	SC 119 / SR 119	Clyo, Georgia and Garnett, South Carolina	
Old Burtons Ferry Swing Bridge	Formerly US 301/SR 73	Sylvania, Georgia and Allendale, South Carolina	
Burtons Ferry Bridge	US 301 / SR 73	Sylvania, Georgia and Allendale, South Carolina	
Sand Bar Ferry Bridge	SC 28 / SR 28	Augusta, Georgia and Beech Island, South Carolina	
Bobby Jones Expressway/Palmetto Parkway Bridge	I-520	Augusta, Georgia and North Augusta, South Carolina	
James U. Jackson Memorial Bridge	US 25 Bus. / SR 4 (13th Street / Georgia Avenue)	Augusta, Georgia and North Augusta, South Carolina	
Jefferson Davis Highway Bridge	US 1 / US 25 / US 78 / US 278 / SC 121 / SR 10 / SR 121 (Gordon Highway / Jefferson Davis Highway)	Augusta, Georgia and North Augusta, South Carolina	
Jefferson Davis Memorial Bridge	5th Street / Rivernorth Drive	Augusta, Georgia and North Augusta, South Carolina	
Interstate 20 Bridge	I-20	Augusta, Georgia and North Augusta, South Carolina	
Furys Ferry Bridge (Furys Ferry Road)	SR 28/SC 28	Evans, Georgia and South Carolina	
J. Strom Thurmond Dam	US 221 / SR 150	Rosemont, Georgia and Clarks Hill, South Carolina	
McCormick Highway Dam	US 378 / SR 43	Lincolnton, Georgia and McCormick, South Carolina	
Calhoun Falls Highway Bridge over Lake Richard B. Russell	SC 72 / SR 72	Elberton, Georgia and Calhoun Falls, South Carolina	
Sgt. Fred M. Newton Bridge over Lake Richard B. Russell	SC 184 / SR 368	Elberton, Georgia and Iva, South Carolina	
Smith McGee Bridge	SC 181 / SR 181	Hartwell, Georgia and Starr, South Carolina	
Hartwell Dam Bridge	US 29 / SR 8	Hartwell, Georgia and Anderson, South Carolina	
Lake Hartwell Bridge	I-85	Lavonia, Georgia and Fair Play, South Carolina	
Toccoa Highway Bridge (old and new)	US 123 / SR 365	Toccoa, Georgia and Westminster, South Carolina	
Cleveland Pike Bridge	SR 184	Toccoa, Georgia and Westminster, South Carolina	

=== Dams ===
- Hartwell Dam
- Richard B. Russell Dam
- J. Strom Thurmond Dam (Clarks Hill Dam)
- Stevens Creek Dam
- Augusta City Dam
- New Savannah Bluff Lock and Dam

== See also ==
- List of Georgia rivers
- List of South Carolina rivers
- South Atlantic-Gulf Water Resource Region
