= Little River (Columbia County, Georgia) =

Coordinates: 33.68596°N 82.21845°W

Location
- Country: United States

Physical characteristics
- Source
  - location: Georgia

The Little River is a 72-mile-long (116 km) tributary of the Savannah River in the U.S. state of Georgia. It is formed by the juncture of its North and South forks 5 miles (8 km) north of Crawfordville, and it flows generally east to Clark Hill Lake, where it joins the Savannah River 2 miles (3 km) north of the dam.

== See also ==
- List of rivers of Georgia
