= Hartwell Dam =

Coordinates: 34°21′28″N 82°49′17″W

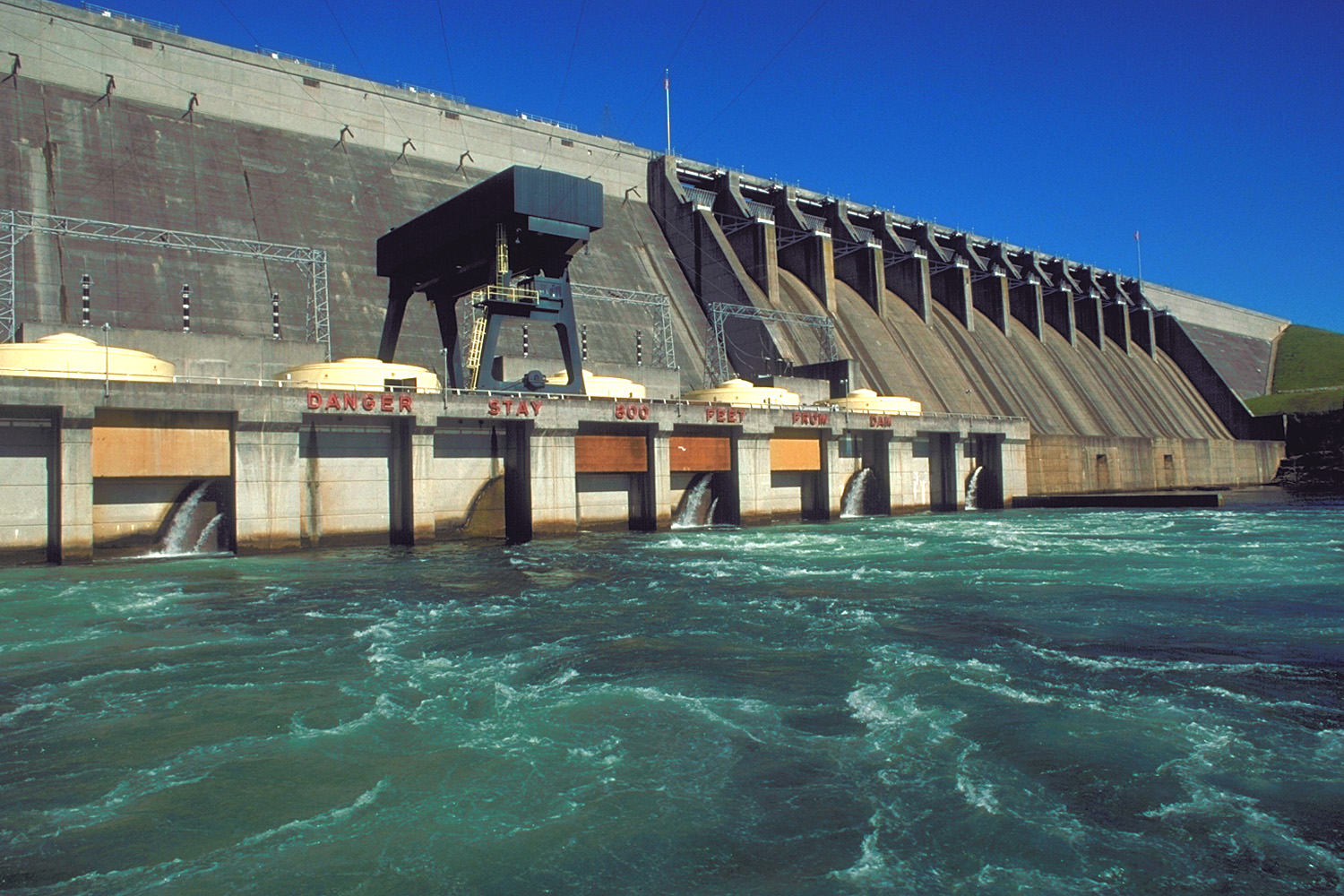
- Hartwell Dam water-control and power-generation structure
- Location: Anderson County, South Carolina / Hart County, Georgia, USA
- Construction began: 1955
- Opening date: 1962
- Construction cost: USD $89,240,000
- Operator(s): U.S. Army Corps of Engineers

Dam and spillways
- Impounds: Savannah River
- Height: 204 feet (62 m)
- Length: 3 miles (4,828 m)

Reservoir
- Surface area: 55,900 acres (22,600 ha)

Power Station
- Turbines: 5
- Installed capacity: 421 MW
- Annual generation: 468,000,000 KWh annually

Hartwell Dam is a concrete and embankment dam located on the Savannah River at the border of South Carolina and Georgia, creating Lake Hartwell. The dam was built by the U.S. Army Corps of Engineers between 1955 and 1962 for the purposes of flood control, hydropower and navigation. The concrete and earthen structure spans 15,840 feet (4,828 m). The concrete section is 1,900 feet (579 m) long and rises 204 feet (62 m) above the riverbed at its apex. The Hartwell Dam currently produces 468 million KWh of electricity annually, has prevented over $40 million in flood damage since completion and also provides recreation, water quality, water supply, along with fish and wildlife management.

== Construction ==
In 1890, Lieutenant Oberlin M. Carter of the U.S. Army Corps of Engineers (USACE) Savannah Office issued a survey report that recommended the construction of dams on the Savannah River in order to prevent flooding in Augusta, Georgia. His report was overlooked until the 1927 Rivers and Harbors Act allowed the USACE to investigate development of the Savannah River for the purpose of hydroelectricity, navigation, flood control, and irrigation. In 1933, the USACE completed its report for the entire Savannah River Basin and recommended against government flood control development of the basin but proposed two hydropower dams in the upper Savannah Basin, the Hartwell and Clark Hill dams.

The Flood Control Act of 1950 authorized the Hartwell Dam and Reservoir as a development project of the Savannah River Basin. Construction on the dam began in 1955 and the plan called for a three-mile long structure containing four hydroelectric generators with a combined 264 MW capacity. Predicting future demand requirements, the ability to install a fifth generator in the future was provided. Of the dam's length, 1,900 ft is a concrete gravity dam, the rest being compacted earth.

A year before its completion, in February 1961, the dam began to inundate a portion of the Savannah River to create the reservoir. In March 1962, the reservoir was complete behind the dam and the four original hydro-power generators went online in April. The original projected cost of the dam was US$68.4 million but when completed was just over US$89.2 million. In 1983, the fifth generator was installed on the dam, raising the generation capacity to 344 MW.

== Hydro-power plant rehabilitation ==
By 1997, the four original generators had exceeded their 30-year life expectancy by seven years and underwent a rehabilitation. Phase 1 began in 1997 and consisted of generator rewinding/turbine refurbishment, replacing and upgrading circuit breakers, and replacing and upgrading the transformers. Phase II consisted of replacing all of the switch-yard breakers and bus-work and updating the powerhouse and Clemson Pumping Station. Upon completion of the rehabilitation, generation capacity was increased to 422 MW, a 22.7% increase.

Electricity from the dam is marketed by the Southeastern Power Administration.

== 2007-2009 drought and controversy ==
In June 2007, drought triggered Level 1 conditions, resulting in reduced flows of 4,200 cubic feet per second (120 m^{3}/s). 2 months later in August, Level 2 was triggered, resulting in a 4,000 cu ft/s (110 m^{3}/s) release. After receiving federal and state agency authorization, the flow was again reduced to 3,600 cu ft/s (100 m^{3}/s) in October 2007. In August 2008, to maintain mid-term hydroelectric output and reservoir levels, releases below 3,600 cu ft/s (100 m^{3}/s) (a goal of 3,100 cu ft/s (88 m^{3}/s)) were explored and temporarily implemented. The flows were increased back to 3600 feet sec in February 2009 to prevent environmental damage. In October 2009, the Savannah River Basin transitioned out of drought and normal flows should soon resume.

The 2007-2009 drought raised controversy over the Southeastern Power Association's (SEPA) role of controlling the Hartwell Dam. Complaints arose that the dam was releasing excess water in order to provide cheap power to communities. In addition, environmental controversy arose as to whether the releases and subsequent draining of the reservoir during a severe drought was necessary.

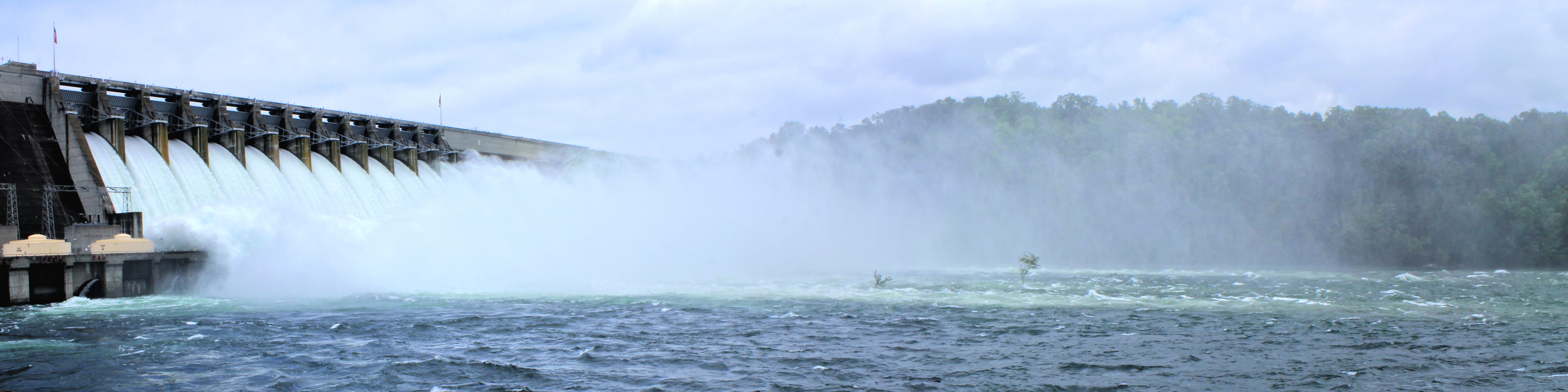
Spillway Gate Test - 2013
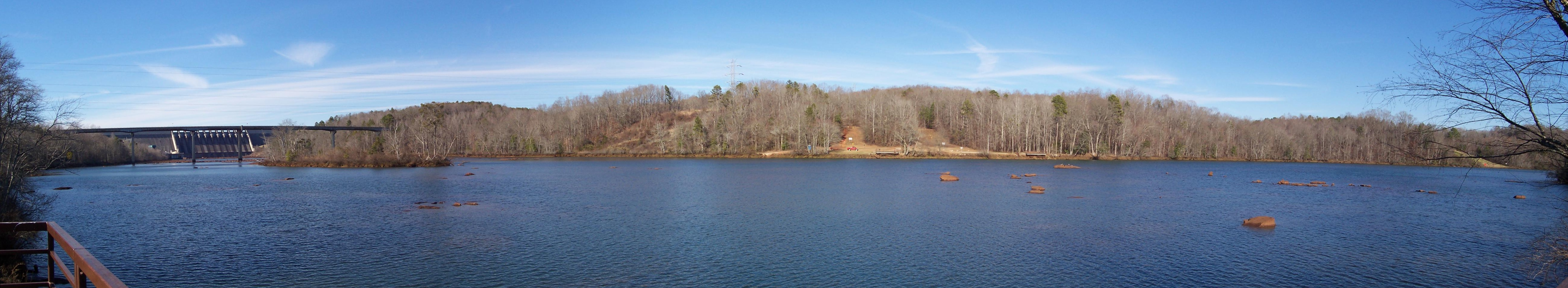
Savannah River below Hartwell Dam
