= List of Georgia state parks =

Location of Georgia’s state parks and historic sites

This is a list of state parks in Georgia. The park system of the US state of Georgia was founded in 1931 with Indian Springs State Park and Vogel State Park. Indian Springs has been operated by the state as a public park since 1825, making it perhaps the oldest state park in the United States. The newest state park is Don Carter State Park.

Since the Great Recession, Georgia has halved the budget for the Division of State Parks and Historic Sites and turned over the management of five of the parks to Coral Hospitality, a Florida-based hotel and resort management company. The five parks are Amicalola Falls State Park & Lodge, Unicoi State Park & Lodge, Little Ocmulgee State Park & Lodge, Georgia Veterans State Park, and George T. Bagby State Park.

== State parks ==
Park name	County or counties	Size		Year established	Location	Water body(s)	Image	Remarks
Park name	County or counties	acres	ha	Year established	Location	Water body(s)	Image	Remarks
A.H. Stephens State Park	Taliaferro	1,177	476	1933	33°33′44.16″N 82°53′44.56″W	Alexander Stevens State Park Lake		
Amicalola Falls State Park & Lodge	Dawson	829	335	1940	34°34′34.11″N 84°14′10.5″W	Amicalola Falls		
Black Rock Mountain State Park	Rabun	1,743	705	1952	34°54′34″N 83°24′55″W	Black Rock Lake		
Chattahoochee Bend State Park	Coweta	2,910	1,180	2011	33°25′58.05″N 84°59′10.13″W	Chattahoochee River		
Cloudland Canyon State Park	Dade	3,488	1,412	1938	34°48′57.96″N 85°29′21.12″W	Hemlock Falls		
Crooked River State Park	Camden	500	200	1939	30°50′35″N 81°33′29″W	Intracoastal Waterway		
Don Carter State Park	Hall	1,316	533	2013	34°23′5.44″N 83°44′35.68″W	Lake Lanier		
Elijah Clark State Park	Lincoln	447	181	1953	33°51′16.2″N 82°25′10.54″W	Clarks Hill Lake		
F. D. Roosevelt State Park	Harris, Meriwether	9,049	3,662	1938	32°49′55″N 84°48′29″W			
Florence Marina State Park	Stewart	173	70	1985	32°5′26.88″N 85°2′35.99″W	Walter F. George Lake		
Fort McAllister State Park	Bryan	1,725	698	1980	31°53′28″N 81°11′46″W	Ogeechee River & Atlantic Ocean		
Fort Mountain State Park	Murray	3,712	1,502	1938	34°45′39.3″N 84°42′25.8″W	Fort Mountain Lake		
Fort Yargo State Park	Barrow	1,816	735	1954	33°58′10.64″N 83°43′46.6″W	Fort Yargo Lake		
General Coffee State Park	Coffee	1,511	611	1970	31°31′26.4″N 82°46′1.2″W			
George L. Smith State Park	Emanuel	1,634	661	1975	32°33′43.2″N 82°6′46.8″W	Parish Pond		
George T. Bagby State Park	Clay	700	280	1970	31°39′57.6″N 85°3′25.2″W	Walter F. George Lake		
Georgia Veterans State Park	Crisp	1,308	529	1946	31°57′23″N 83°54′58″W	Lake Blackshear		
Jack Hill State Park	Tattnall	662	268	1956	32°5′31.51″N 82°8′9.61″W	Altamaha River		
Hamburg State Park	Warren	741	300	1968	33°12′28.37″N 82°47′20.05″W	Hamburg Mill Pond		
Hard Labor Creek State Park	Morgan	5,804	2,349	1946	33°39′49.88″N 83°36′22.15″W	Hard Labor Creek		
High Falls State Park	Monroe	1,050	420	1966	33°10′44.31″N 84°1′10.73″W	Towaliga River		
Indian Springs State Park	Butts	528	214	1825	33°14′38″N 83°55′52″W	Sandy Creek		
James H. Floyd State Park	Chattooga	561	227	1973	34°26′13.83″N 85°20′22.47″W	Sloppy Floyd Lake		
Kolomoki Mounds State Park	Early	1,293	523	1938	31°28′17.28″N 84°55′45.72″W	Yahola & Kolomoki Lakes		
Laura S. Walker State Park	Ware	626	253	1941	31°8′10.67″N 82°12′36.3″W	Laura S. Walker Lake	Laura S Walker State Park	
Little Ocmulgee State Park & Lodge	Telfair	1,360	550	1935	32°5′32.17″N 82°53′49.11″W	Little Ocmulgee Lake		
Magnolia Springs State Park	Jenkins	1,070	430	1939	32°53′12″N 81°57′20″W	Magnolia Springs State Park Lake		
Mistletoe State Park	Columbia	1,920	780	1965	33°38′37.56″N 82°23′2.7″W	Clarks Hill Lake		
Moccasin Creek State Park	Rabun	32	13	1966	34°49′36.84″N 83°33′18.36″W	Lake Burton		
Panola Mountain State Park	Rockdale	1,635	662	1974	33°38′7″N 84°10′13″W	Alexander Lake & South River		
Providence Canyon State Outdoor Recreation Area	Stewart	1,003	406	1971	32°3′47.44″N 84°55′11.58″W			
Red Top Mountain State Park	Bartow	1,776	719	1950	34°9′5.4″N 84°42′55.8″W	Lake Allatoona		
Reed Bingham State Park	Colquitt	1,613	653	1958	31°10′14.49″N 83°33′16.98″W	Reed Bingham Lake		
Richard B. Russell State Park	Elbert	2,508	1,015	1987	34°10′41.09″N 82°45′40.89″W	Russell Lake		
Seminole State Park	Seminole	604	244	1956	30°48′18.61″N 84°52′44.2″W	Lake Seminole		
Skidaway Island State Park	Chatham	588	238	1975	31°56′13.41″N 81°3′7.98″W	Intracoastal Waterway		
Smithgall Woods State Park	White	5,664	2,292	1994	34°41′30.57″N 83°46′4.71″W	Dukes Creek		
Stephen C. Foster State Park	Charlton	80	32	1954	30°49′35.86″N 82°22′45.9″W	Suwannee River		
Sweetwater Creek State Park	Douglas	2,549	1,032	1972	33°45′30″N 84°38′10″W	Sweetwater Creek		
Tallulah Gorge State Park	Rabun, Habersham	2,739	1,108	1993	34°43′30″N 83°22′13″W	Tallulah River		
Tugaloo State Park	Franklin	393	159	1965	34°29′41.37″N 83°4′4.54″W	Lake Hartwell		
Unicoi State Park & Lodge	White	1,050	420	1954	34°43′22.92″N 83°43′20.28″W	Unicoi Lake		
Victoria Bryant State Park	Franklin	502	203	1952	34°18′4.23″N 83°9′35.52″W	North Fork of the Broad River		
Vogel State Park	Union	233	94	1927	34°45′46″N 83°55′40″W	Lake Trahlyta		
Watson Mill Bridge State Park	Madison	1,118	452	1969	34°1′34″N 83°4′23″W	South Fork of the Broad River		

== Historic sites ==
Park name	County or Counties	Size		Year established	Location	Image	Remarks
Park name	County or Counties	acres	ha	Year established	Location	Image	Remarks
Chief Vann House State Historic Site	Murray	137	55	1952	34°45′47.21″N 84°49′19.14″W		
Dahlonega Gold Museum State Historic Site	Lumpkin	.264	0.107	1966	34°31′57.62″N 83°59′5.46″W		
Etowah Indian Mounds State Historic Site	Bartow	54	22	1953	34°7′40.83″N 84°48′25.42″W		
Fort King George State Historic Site	McIntosh	12	4.9	1940	31°21′59.18″N 81°24′57.13″W		
Fort Morris State Historic Site	Liberty	67	27	1968	31°45′36.2″N 81°17′22.14″W		
Hardman Farm State Historic Site	White	173	70	2014	34°41′5.97″N 83°42′29.73″W		
Hofwyl-Broadfield Plantation State Historic Site	Glynn	1,286	520	1974	31°18′18.09″N 81°27′19.83″W		
Jarrell Plantation State Historic Site	Monroe	200	81	1974	33°2′53.29″N 83°43′9.93″W		
Jefferson Davis Memorial State Historic Site	Irwin	13	5.3	1997	31°39′52.38″N 83°23′12.07″W		
Lapham-Patterson House State Historic Site	Thomas	1	0.40	1971	30°50′44.2″N 83°58′58.45″W		
Little White House State Historic Site	Meriwether	163	66	1948	32°52′52.99″N 84°41′15.48″W		
New Echota State Historic Site	Gordon	200	81	1962	34°32′27.55″N 84°54′33.59″W		
Pickett's Mill Battlefield State Historic Site	Paulding	765	310	1974	33°58′26.41″N 84°45′32.93″W		
Reynolds Mansion on Sapelo Island	McIntosh	6,110	2,470		31°23′49.57″N 81°16′37.38″W		
Robert Toombs House State Historic Site	Wilkes	4.34	1.76	1982	33°44′10.07″N 82°44′1.91″W		
Traveler's Rest State Historic Site	Stephens	5.1	2.1	1955	34°36′33.26″N 83°14′19.73″W		
Wormsloe State Historic Site	Chatham	1,232	499	1973	31°58′48.69″N 81°4′9.26″W		

== Former state parks ==
Park name	County or Counties	Size		Year established	Year disestablished	Location	Image	Remarks
Park name	County or Counties	acres	ha	Year established	Year disestablished	Location	Image	Remarks
Chehaw State Park	Dougherty	800	320	1937	1977	31°37′3.44″N 84°8′17.17″W		In 1974, the city of Albany leased 100 acres (40 ha) of unused land in Chehaw Park from the state of Georgia to develop a wild animal park where exotic and indigenous animals would be displayed in their natural habitats. With the inception of the wild animal habitat, the State donated the entire Chehaw Park acreage to the city to further develop.
Bobby Brown State Park	Elbert	665	269	1950s	2015	33°58′26.93″N 82°34′43.6″W		The park was established on the waters of the newly constructed Clark Hills Lake in the 1950s. It was downgraded to Bobby Brown State Outdoor Recreation Area in 2009. In 2015, a lease agreement was reached with the United States Army Corps of Engineers. The park is now operated by the government of Elbert County, Georgia.
George Washington Carver State Park	Bartow	345	140	1950	1975	34°8′20.86″N 84°40′1.06″W		It was established during segregation on land adjacent to Red Top Mountain State Park and billed as Georgia's first state park for African Americans. It was removed from the state park system due to budget cuts, turned over to Bartow County, and renamed Bartow Carver Park. It returned to its original name in 2017.
Hart State Park	Hart	147	59	1968	2020	34°22′35.16″N 82°54′38.4″W		In April 2020, management of the park passed from the Georgia Department of Natural Resources to the City of Hartwell. In June 2020, a groundbreaking ceremony was officially held for the renamed Hartwell Lakeside Park.
Jekyll Island State Park	Glynn	5,700	2,300	1947	1950	31°4′12″N 81°25′13″W		It was formerly a state park, but since 1951 it has been managed by the Jekyll Island Authority, a self-supporting state agency.
John Tanner State Park	Carroll	138	56	1971	2013	33°36′7.92″N 85°10′3.72″W		Operated from 1954 to 1971 as Tanner's Beach, it was purchased by the state in 1971, and opened in 1972. It became managed by Carroll County in 2010 and was purchased by Carroll County in 2013.
Santo Domingo State Park	Glynn			1934	1946	31°19′37.28″N 81°29′13.13″W		The state of Georgia conveyed the Santo Domingo State Park property to J. Ardell Nation in 1946. Ardell established the Boys Estate, an orphanage for homeless boys modeled upon Boys Town, Nebraska. The former property of the Boys Estate is now run by Morningstar Children and Family Services.
Sprewell Bluff State Park	Upson	1,372	555	1993	2013	31°52′15.85″N 84°28′26.15″W		It was a state park leased from Georgia Power. In 2013, Upson County, Georgia took over management of the property and it was de-listed.
Standing Boy Creek Park	Muscogee	1,579	639	2004	2022	32°34′20.33″N 85°2′10.77″W		Transferred to the City of Columbus for funding purposes

== Other ==
- Lake Lanier Islands were leased from the US Army Corps of Engineers by the Georgia Department of State Parks for a recreation resort. The islands are now managed by a private company.
- Stone Mountain Park is owned by the state and managed by the self-sufficient state agency, the Stone Mountain Memorial Association. It is operated as an amusement park under a contract with the Herschend Family Entertainment Corporation.

== Images ==
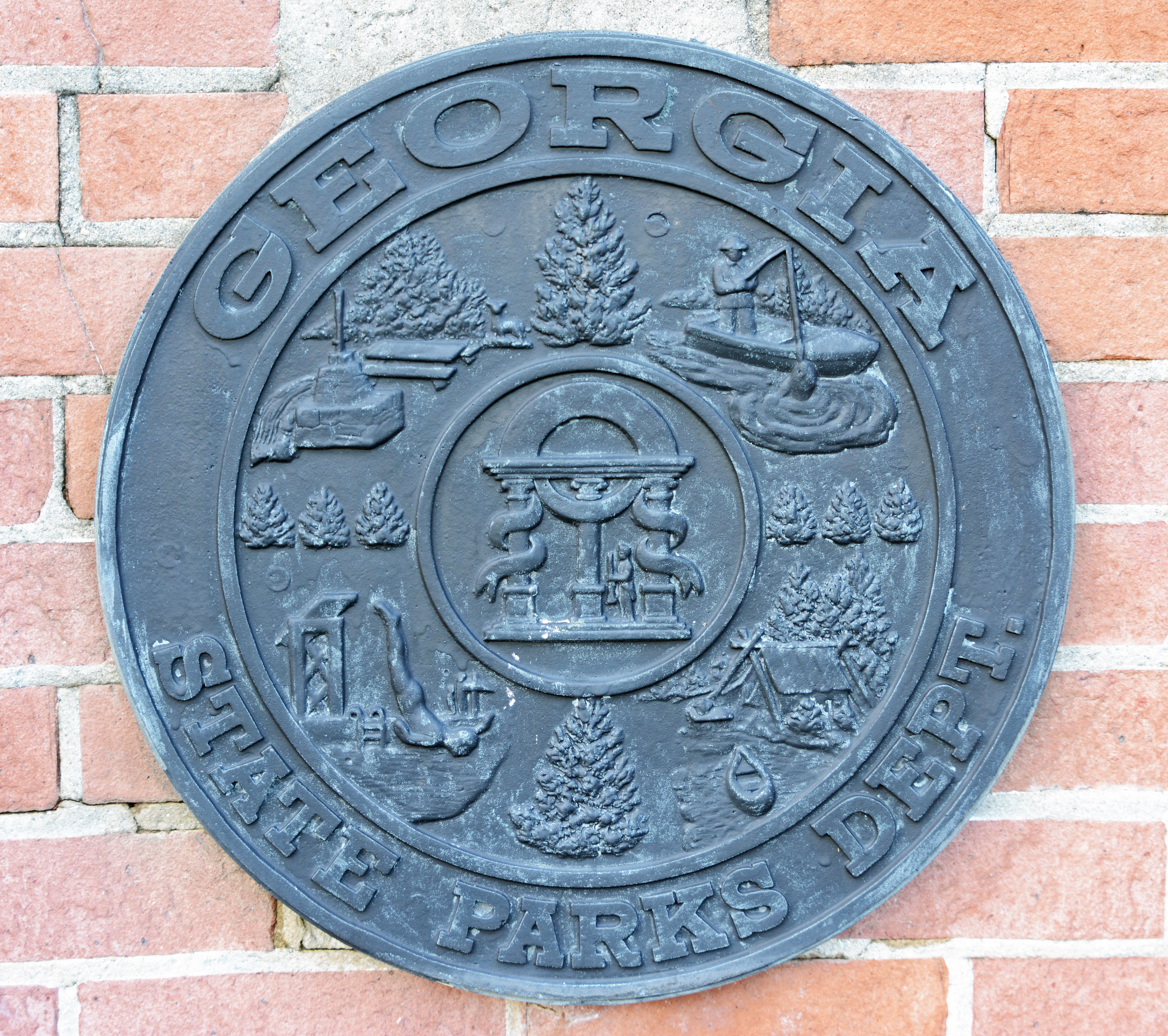
Georgia State Parks Dept. seal, ca. 1939

Enjoy Yourself in Georgia We Have Variety

Georgia's state parks

== See also ==
- List of U.S. national parks
