= Dining room =

Room dedicated to consuming food

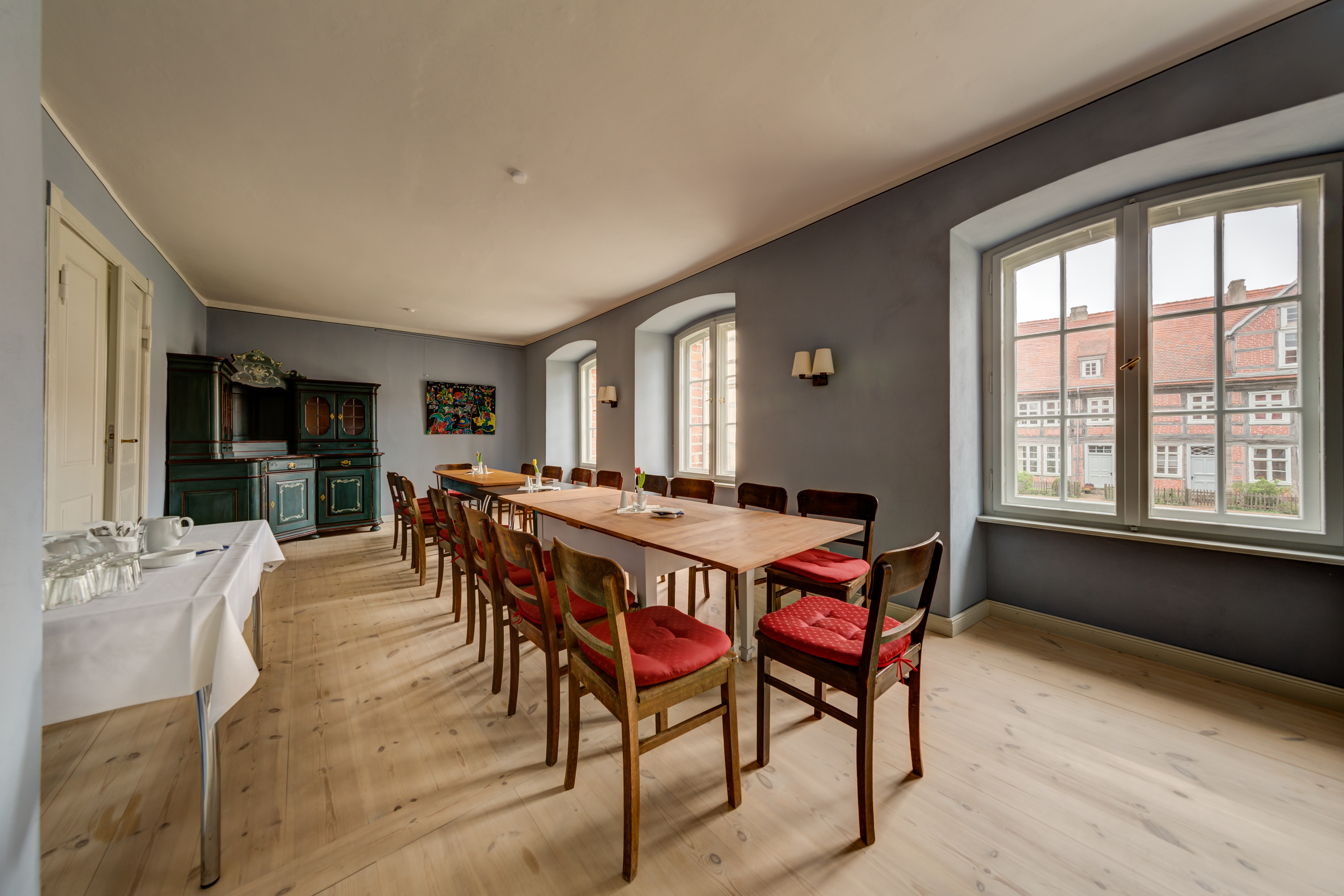
A dining room

A dining room is a room for consuming food. In modern times it is usually next to the kitchen for convenience in serving, though in medieval times it was often on an entirely different floor level. Historically the dining room is furnished with a rather large dining table and several dining chairs. The most common shape is generally rectangular with two armed end chairs and an even number of unarmed side chairs on the long sides.

== History ==
In the Middle Ages, Britons and other European nobility in castles or large manor houses dined in the great hall. This was a large multi-function room capable of seating the bulk of the population of the house. The family would sit at the head table on a raised dais, with the rest of the population arrayed in order of diminishing rank away from them. Tables in the great hall would tend to be long trestle tables with benches. The sheer number of people in a Great Hall meant it would probably have had a busy, bustling atmosphere. Suggestions that it would also have been quite smelly and smoky are probably, by the standards of the time, unfounded. These rooms had large chimneys and high ceilings and there would have been a free flow of air through the numerous door and window openings.

It is true that the owners of such properties began to develop a taste for more intimate gatherings in smaller 'parlers' or 'privee parlers' off the main hall, but this is thought to be due as much to political and social changes as to the greater comfort afforded by such rooms. Over time, the nobility took more of their meals in the parlour, which became, functionally, a dining room (or was split into two separate rooms). It also migrated further from the Great Hall, often accessed via grand ceremonial staircases from the dais in the Great Hall. Eventually dining in the Great Hall became something that was done primarily on special occasions.

Towards the beginning of the 18th century, a pattern emerged where the ladies of the house would withdraw after dinner from the dining room to the drawing room. The gentlemen would remain in the dining room having drinks. The dining room tended to take on a more masculine tenor as a result.

In the 1930s and 40s, dining rooms continued to be separate from kitchens even as servant's rooms became less common in middle-class houses. In the 1950s and 60s, dining and kitchen areas were merged, and living rooms were merged with the kitchen-dining rooms.

During the COVID-19 pandemic, dining rooms that still existed were used as home offices or classrooms and were valuable for their seclusion.

== Contemporary usage ==
A typical North American dining room will contain a table with chairs arranged along the sides and ends of the table, as well as other pieces of furniture such as sideboards and china cabinets, as space permits. Tables in modern dining rooms will often have a removable leaf to allow for the larger number of people present on those special occasions without taking up extra space when not in use. Although the "typical" family dining experience is at a wooden table or some sort of kitchen area, some choose to make their dining rooms more comfortable by using couches or cushioned chairs.

In modern American and Canadian homes, the dining room is typically adjacent to the living room, being increasingly used only for formal dining with guests or on special occasions. For informal daily meals, most medium size houses and larger will have a space adjacent to the kitchen where a table and chairs can be placed. Larger spaces are often known as a dinette while a smaller one is called a breakfast nook. Smaller houses and condos may have a breakfast bar instead, typically of a different height than the regular kitchen counter (either raised for stools or lowered for chairs). If a home lacks a dinette, breakfast nook, or breakfast bar, then the kitchen or family room will be used for day-to-day eating.

In Britain, many families would traditionally use the dining room only on Sundays, eating other meals in the kitchen.

In Australia, the use of a dining room is still prevalent, yet not an essential part of modern home design. For most, it is considered a space to be used during formal occasions or celebrations. Smaller homes may use a breakfast bar or table placed within a kitchen or living space for meals.

== Gallery ==
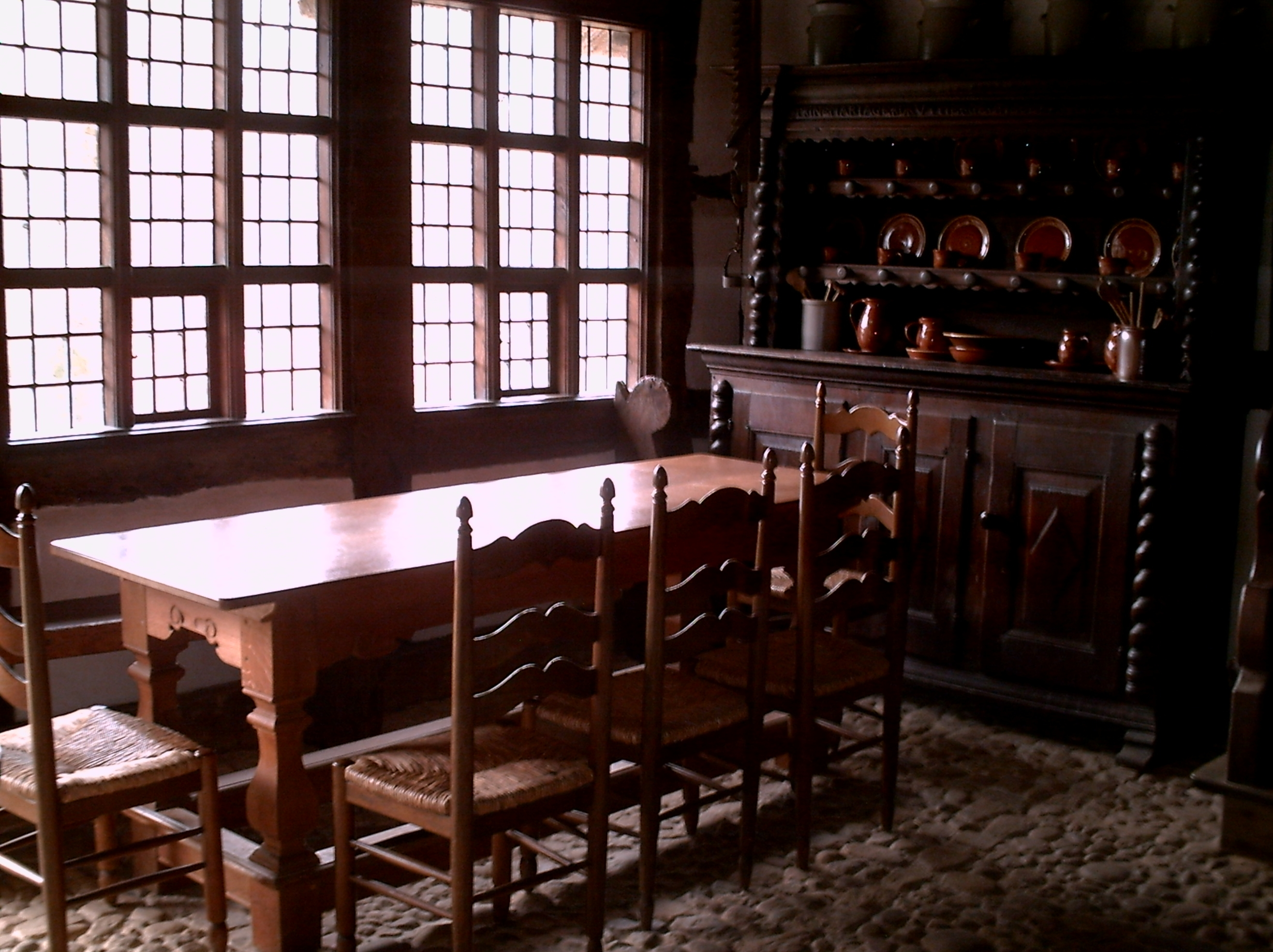
Historical example of a domestic dining room in Germany.

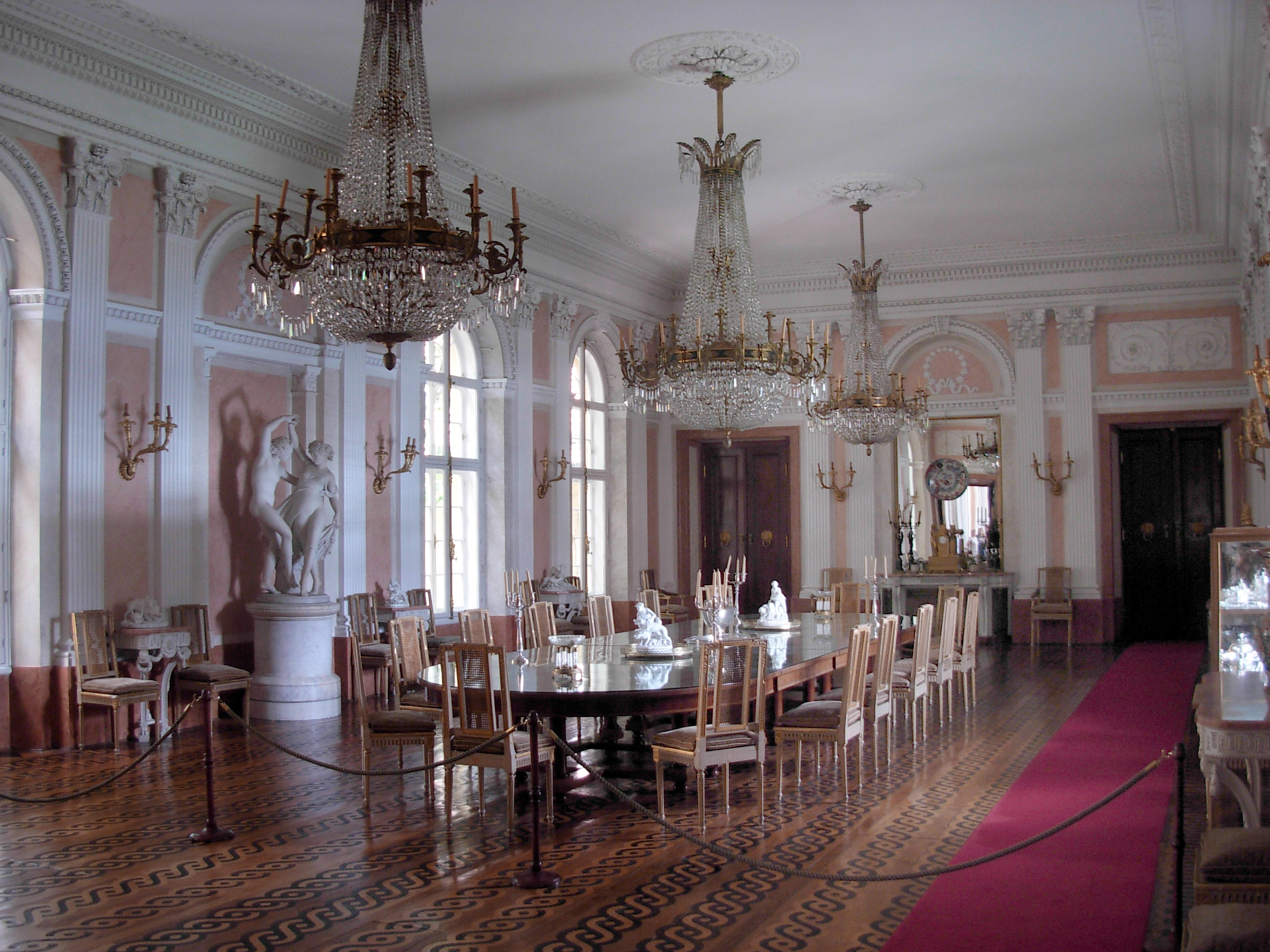
Dining Room in the Łańcut Castle, Poland

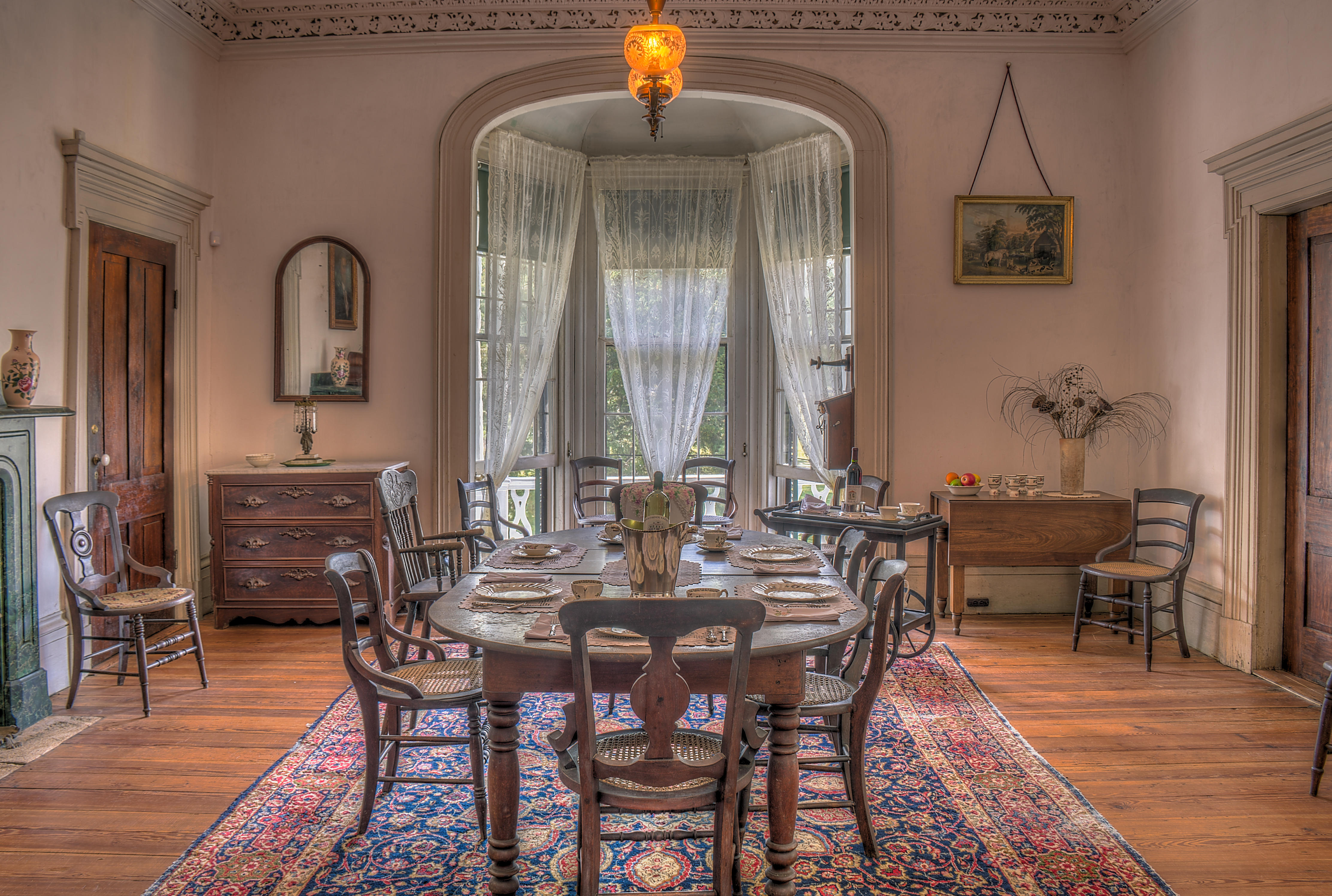
Dining room of West End mansion at Hardman Farm near Helen, GA

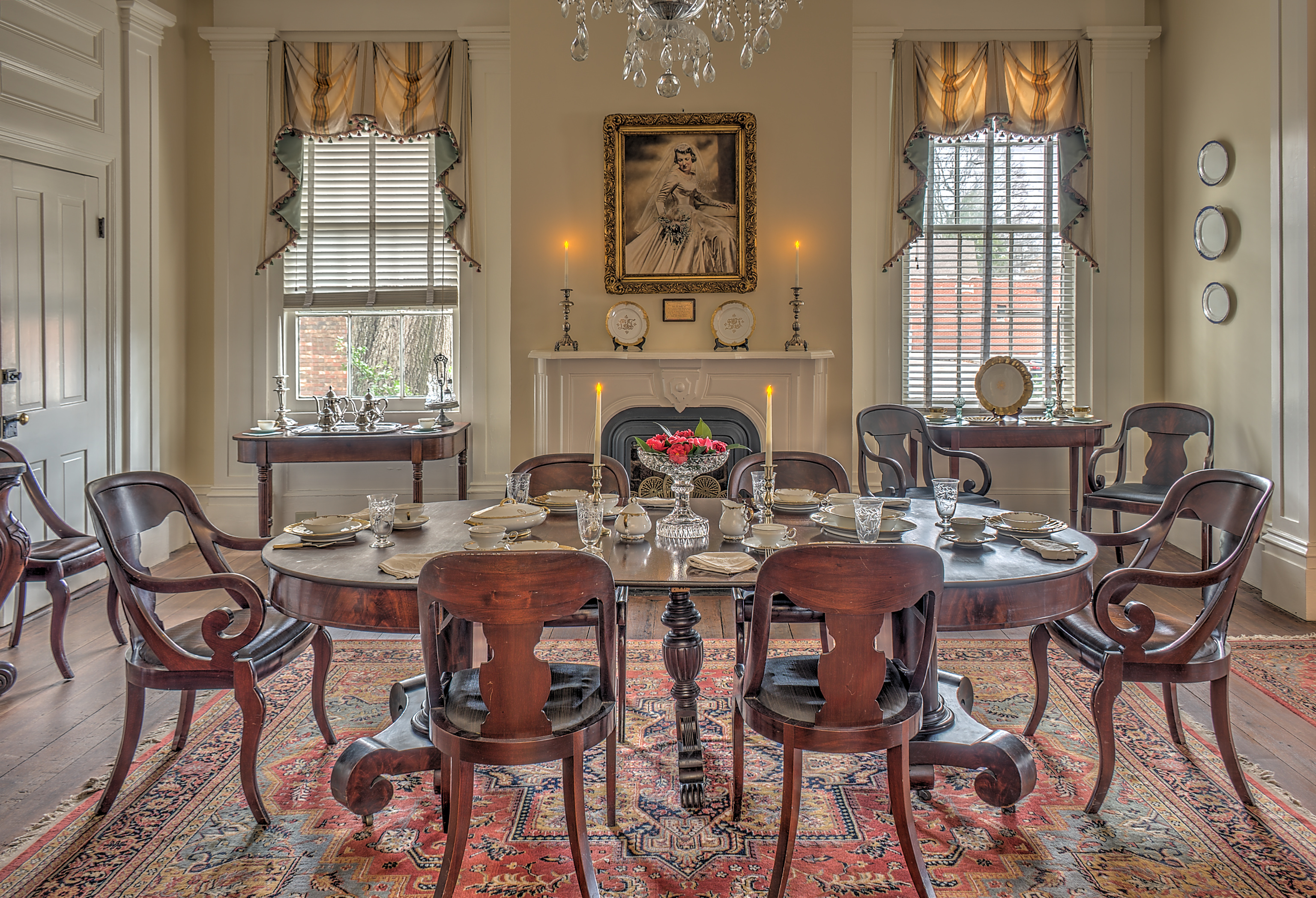
Dining room at Heritage Hall in Madison, GA

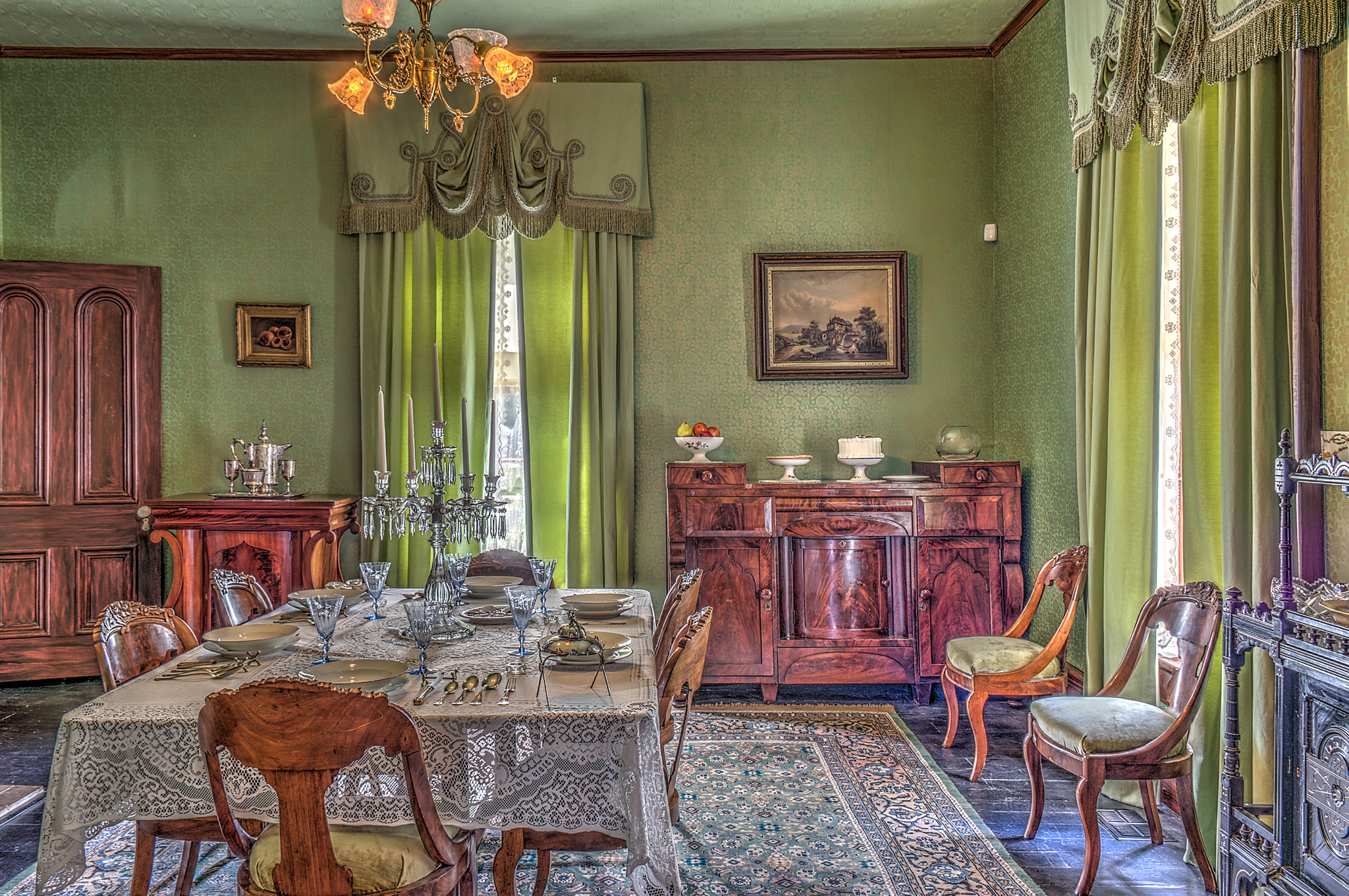
Dining room at Sam Bell Maxey House in Paris, TX

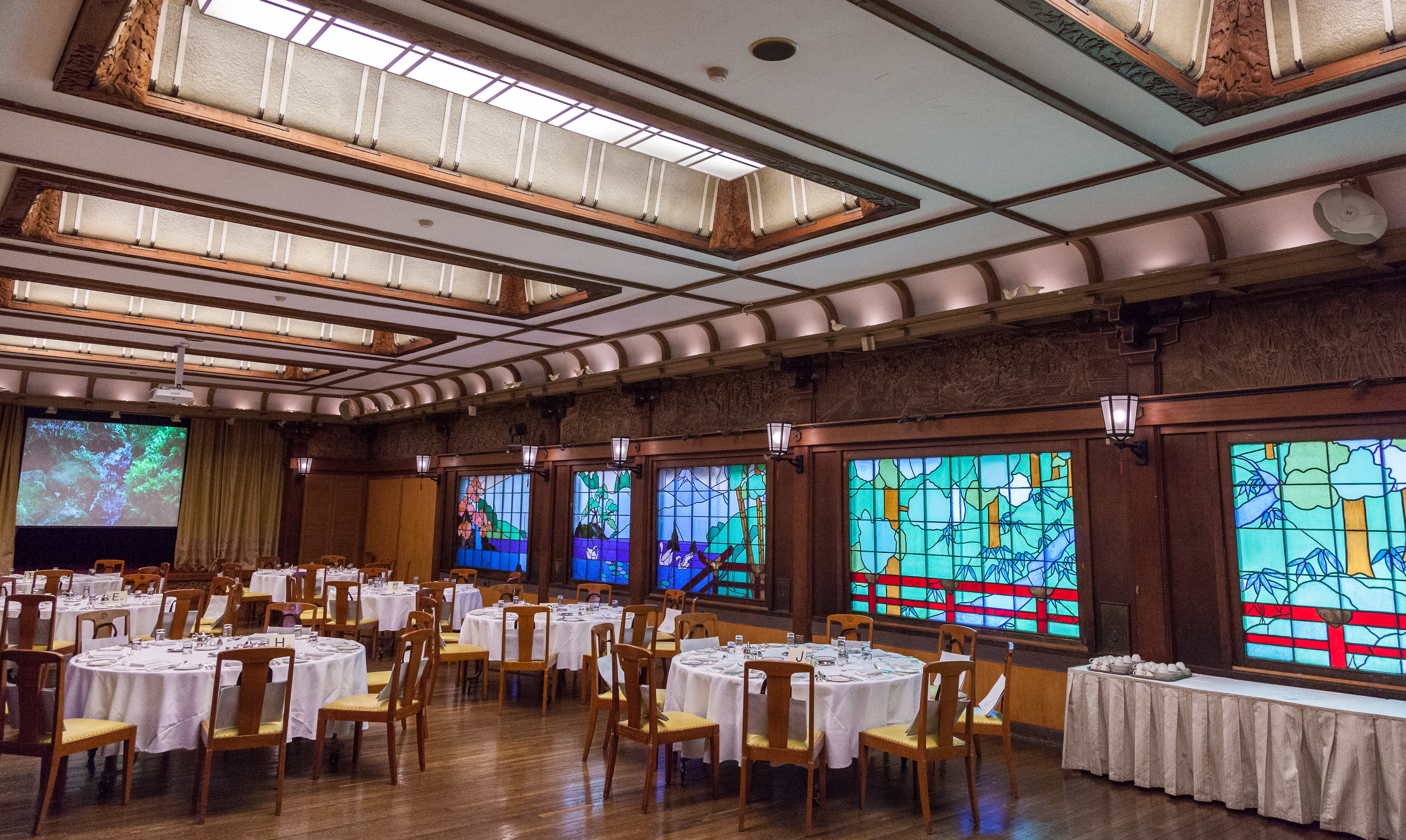
A Japanese example: the dining room of the Fujiya Hotel in Hakone

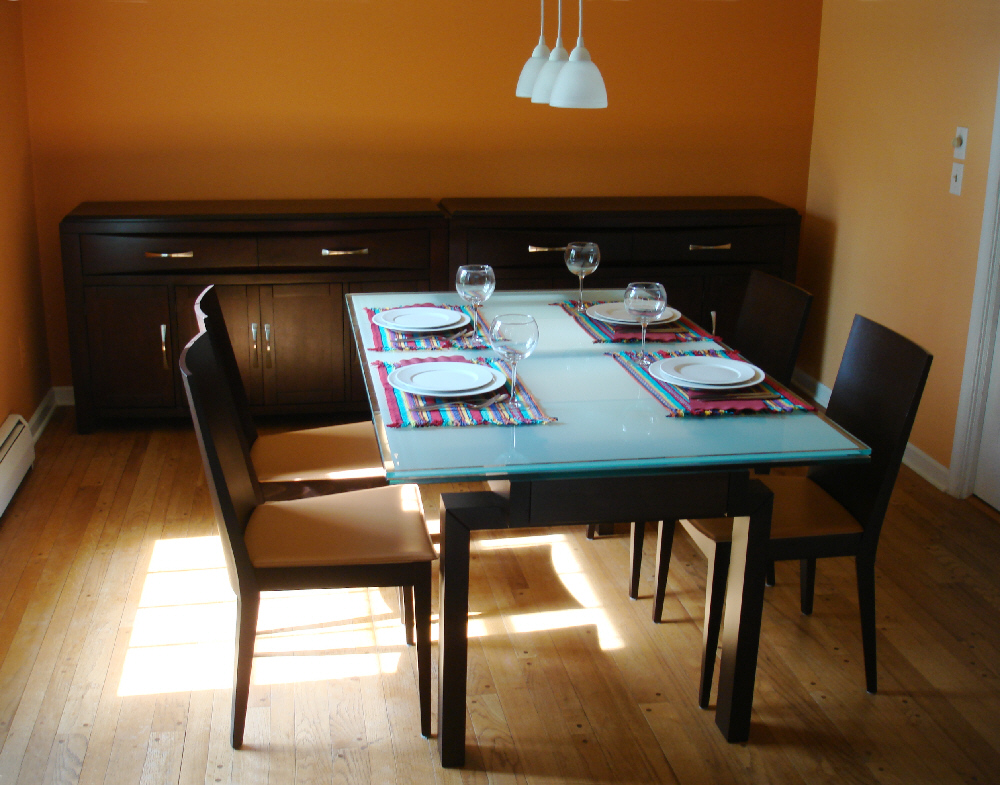
Example of a modern-day dining room from the United States.

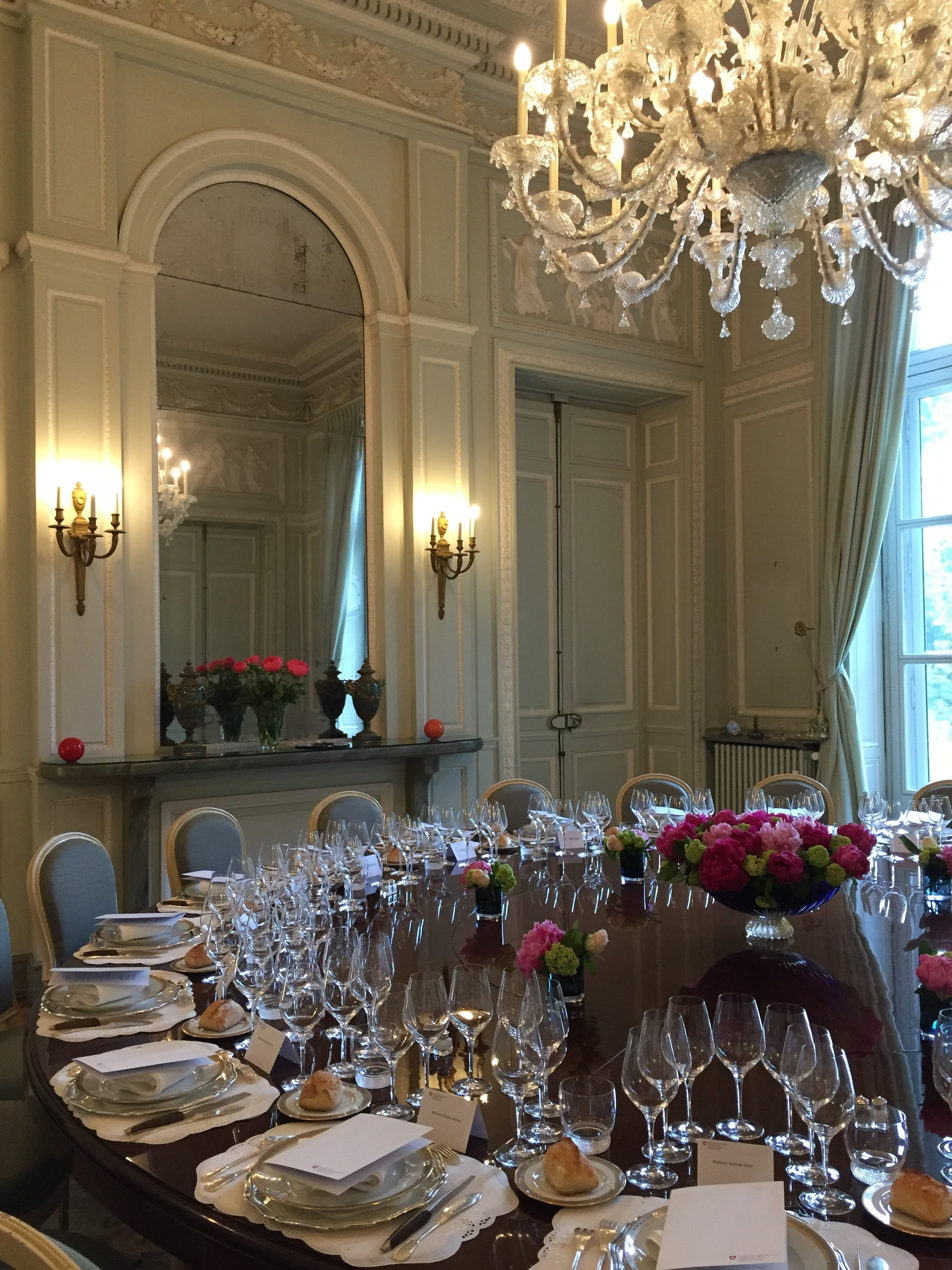
Dining room at the Embassy of Switzerland in Paris, built in 1782

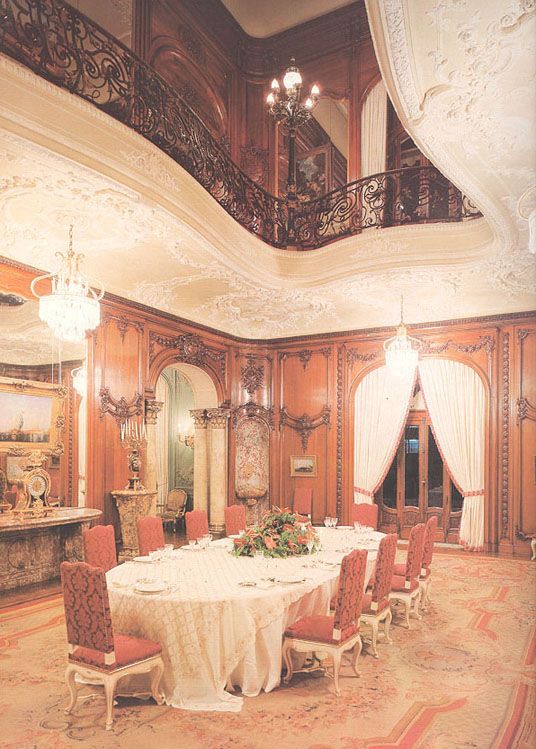
Dining room in the Laranjeiras Palace, the official residence of the governor of the Brazilian state of Rio de Janeiro

== See also ==
- Cafeteria
- Refectory
