= Mistletoe State Park =

State park in Georgia, United States

- Location within Georgia Location within the United States
- Location: Columbia County, Georgia
- Nearest city: Augusta, Georgia
- Coordinates: 33.65037°N 82.37261°W
- Area: 1,972 acres (7.98 km^{2})
- Established: 1970
- Governing body: Georgia Department of Natural Resources

Mistletoe State Park is a 1,972 acre (7.98 km^{2}) Georgia state park located northwest of Augusta, Georgia on the southern shore of Lake Strom Thurmond. The park gets its name from Mistletoe Corners, a local area where people gather to pick mistletoe during the winter holiday season. Its strategic location on the lake makes it one of the finest bass fishing spots in the nation. The park also offers public beaches and 8 miles of nature trails. The land on which the park is located is leased to Georgia by the United States Army Corps of Engineers.

== Facilities ==
- 84 Tent/Trailer/RV Sites
- 10 Cottages
- 1 Fisherman's Cabin
- 1 Tent Cabin
- 1 Beachhouse
- Sand Beach
- 3 Boat Ramps
- 4 Walk-In Campsites
- 1 Pioneer Campground
- 5 Picnic Shelters
- 1 Group Shelter
- 3 Backcountry Campsites
