= Mistletoe Corners, Georgia =

Unincorporated community in Georgia, U.S.

Coordinates: 33°37′58″N 82°23′56″W

Mistletoe Corners is an unincorporated community in Columbia County, in the U.S. state of Georgia. The community lends its name to nearby Mistletoe State Park.

== History ==
A variant name is "Mistletoe". A post office called Mistletoe was established in 1894, and remained in operation until 1916.
