= Indian Springs State Park =

State park in Georgia, United States

Coordinates: 33°14′38″N 83°55′52″W

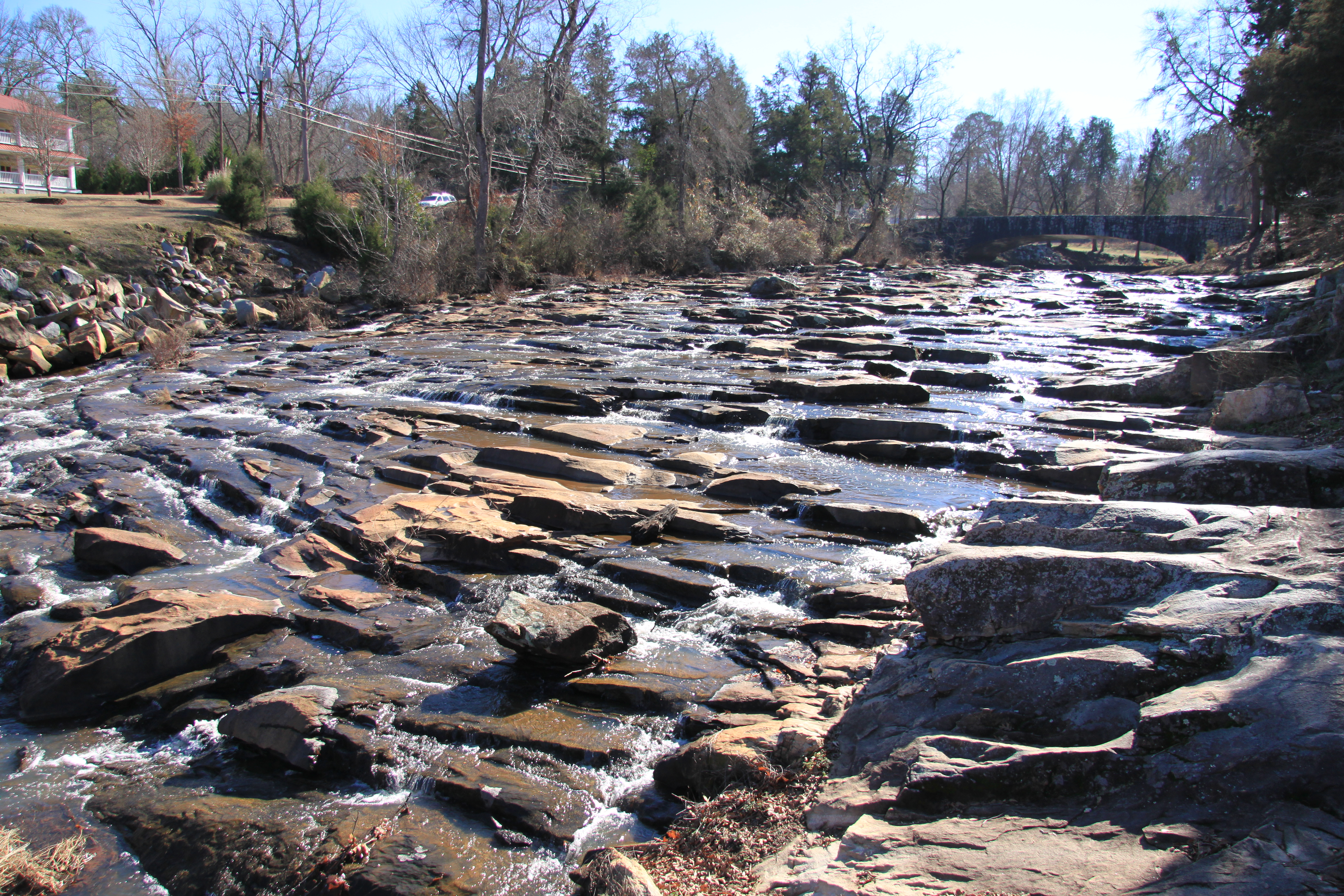
- Indian Springs State Park, January 2015
- Interactive map of Indian Springs State Park
- Location: Butts County, Georgia, US
- Nearest city: Jackson, Georgia
- Area: 528 acres (2.14 km^{2}; 0.83 sq mi)
- Established: 1826 (officially in 1931)
- Governing body: Georgia Department of Natural Resources Division of State Parks & Historic Sites
- Website: Official website

Indian Springs State Park is a 528-acre (2.14 km^{2}) Georgia state park located near Jackson and Flovilla that is one of the oldest state parks in the nation. The park is named for its several springs, which the Creek Indians used for centuries to heal the sick. The water from these springs is said to have a sulfur smell and taste. It was acquired from the Creek Indians by the state through the Treaty of Indian Springs (1825) and the Treaty of Washington (1826). Thereafter, Indian Springs has been operated continuously by the state as a public park, although it did not gain the title "State Park" until 1931. The area became a resort town in the 19th century. It became an official "State Forest Park" in 1927. In 1931, along with Vogel State Park, it became a founding unit of Georgia's state park system.

Visitors are still allowed to sample the park's spring water, all the while enjoying swimming, fishing, and boating. Several structures within the park were built during the Great Depression by members of the Civilian Conservation Corps. The park also contains a 105-acre (0.42 km^{2}) lake consistently stocked with fish, as well as a 3/4 mile (1.2 km) nature trail. A 3.25 miles (5.23 km) trail connects the park to Dauset Trails.

The park features a small museum that is open seasonally. Exhibits include the park's natural history, the resort era, activities of the CCC, and the history and culture of the Creek Indians.

== Facilities ==
- 62 Tent/Trailer/RV Campsites
- 10 Cottages
- 5 Picnic Shelters
- 1 Group Shelter
- 1 Group Camp
- 1 Stone Pavilion
- 1 Pioneer Campground
- Miniature Golf Course
- Boat Rental
- Idlewilde Event Center

== Annual events ==
- Southeastern Indian Celebration (June)
- Astronomy Program (August)
- Christmas at Idelwilde (December)

== Images ==
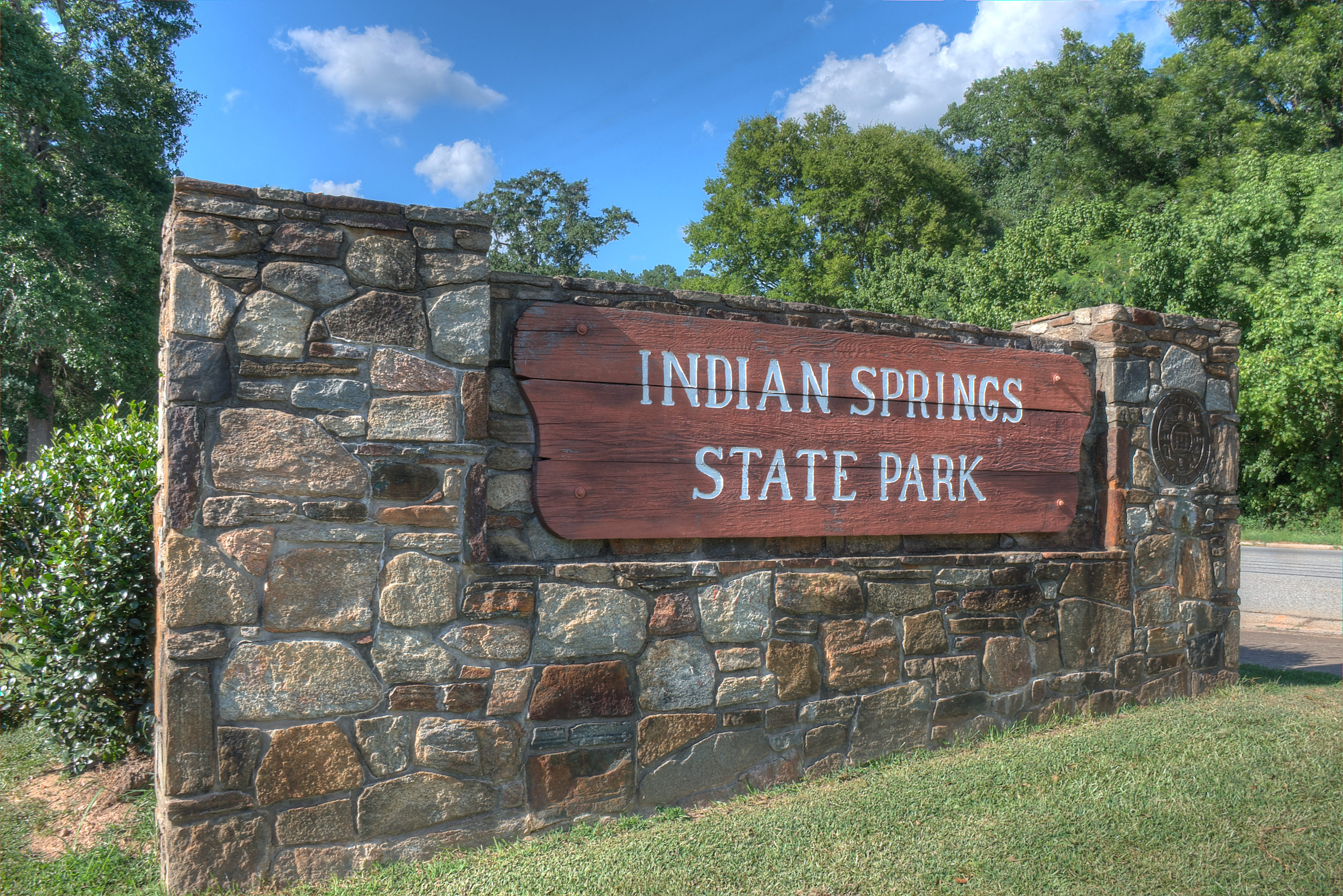
Entrance sign

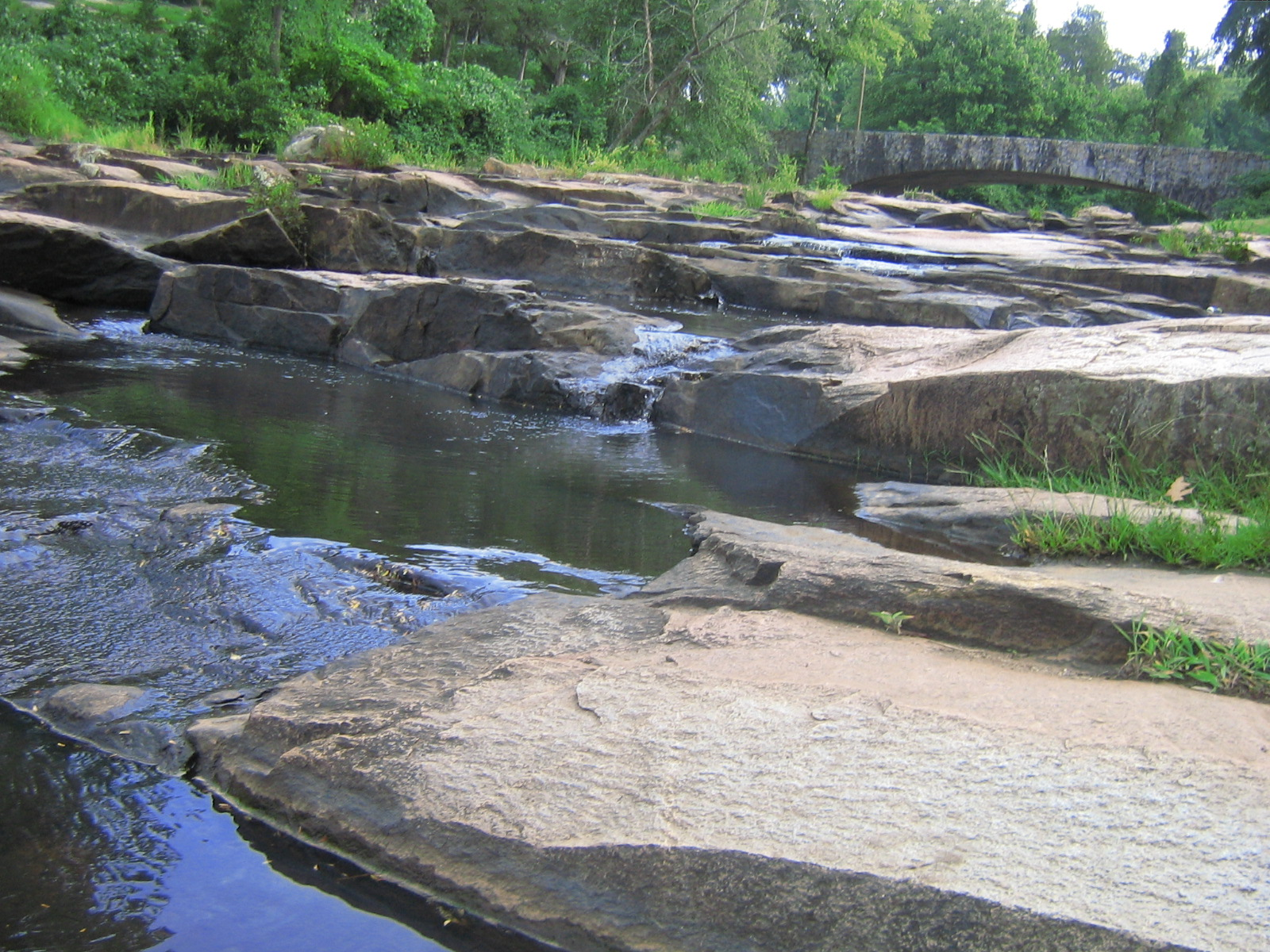
Creek at Indian Springs State Park

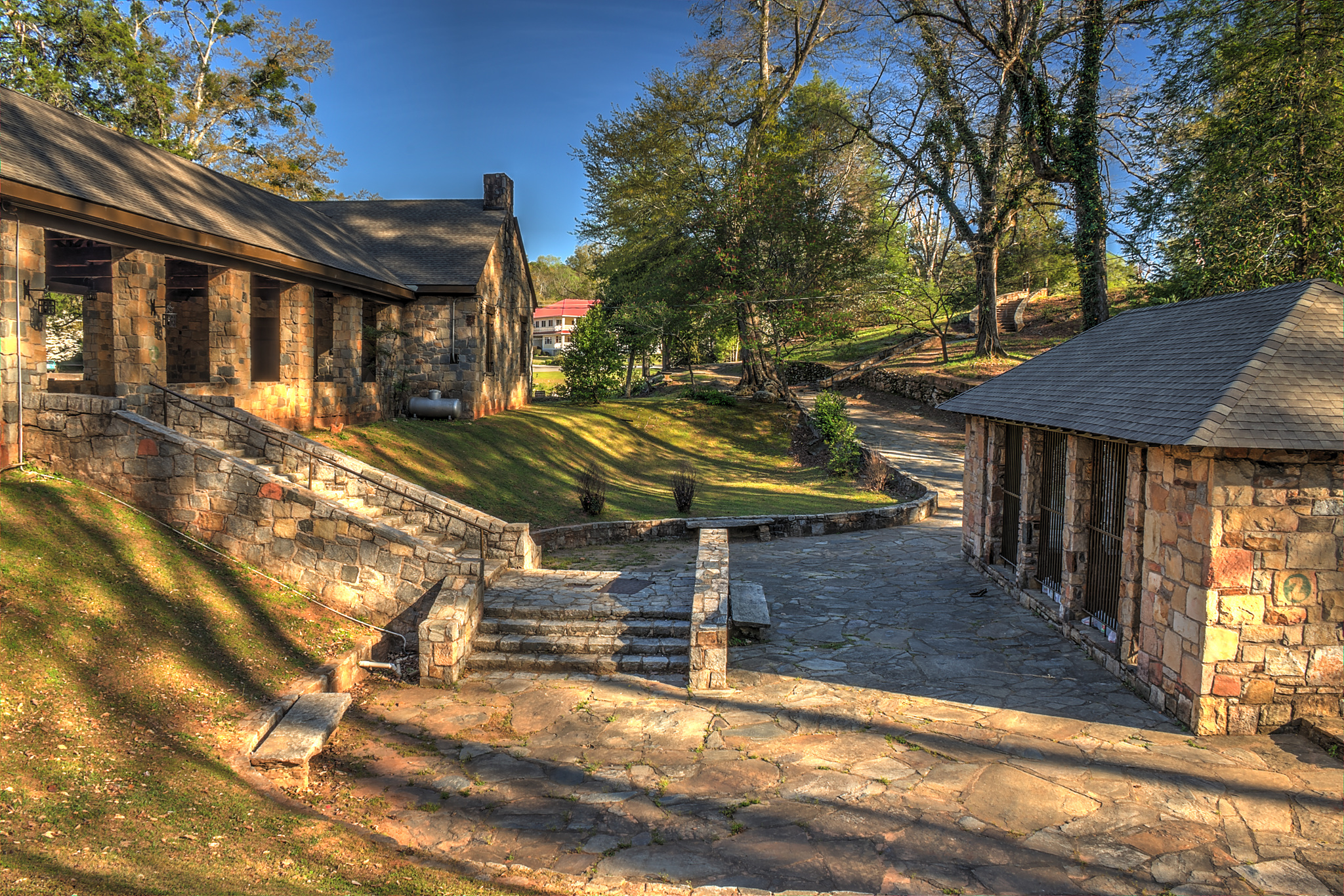
stone pavilion and spring house

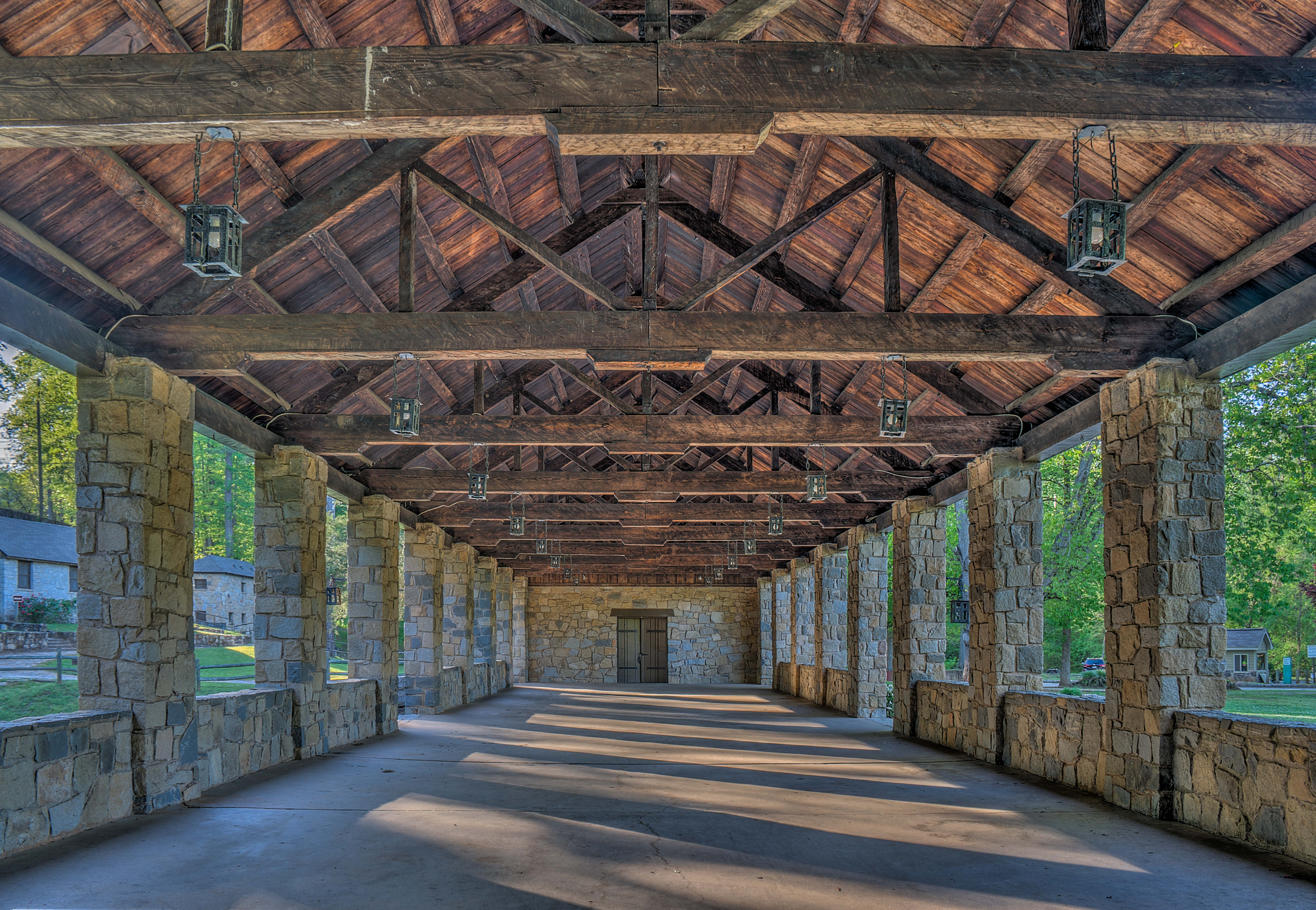
Stone Pavilion (interior)

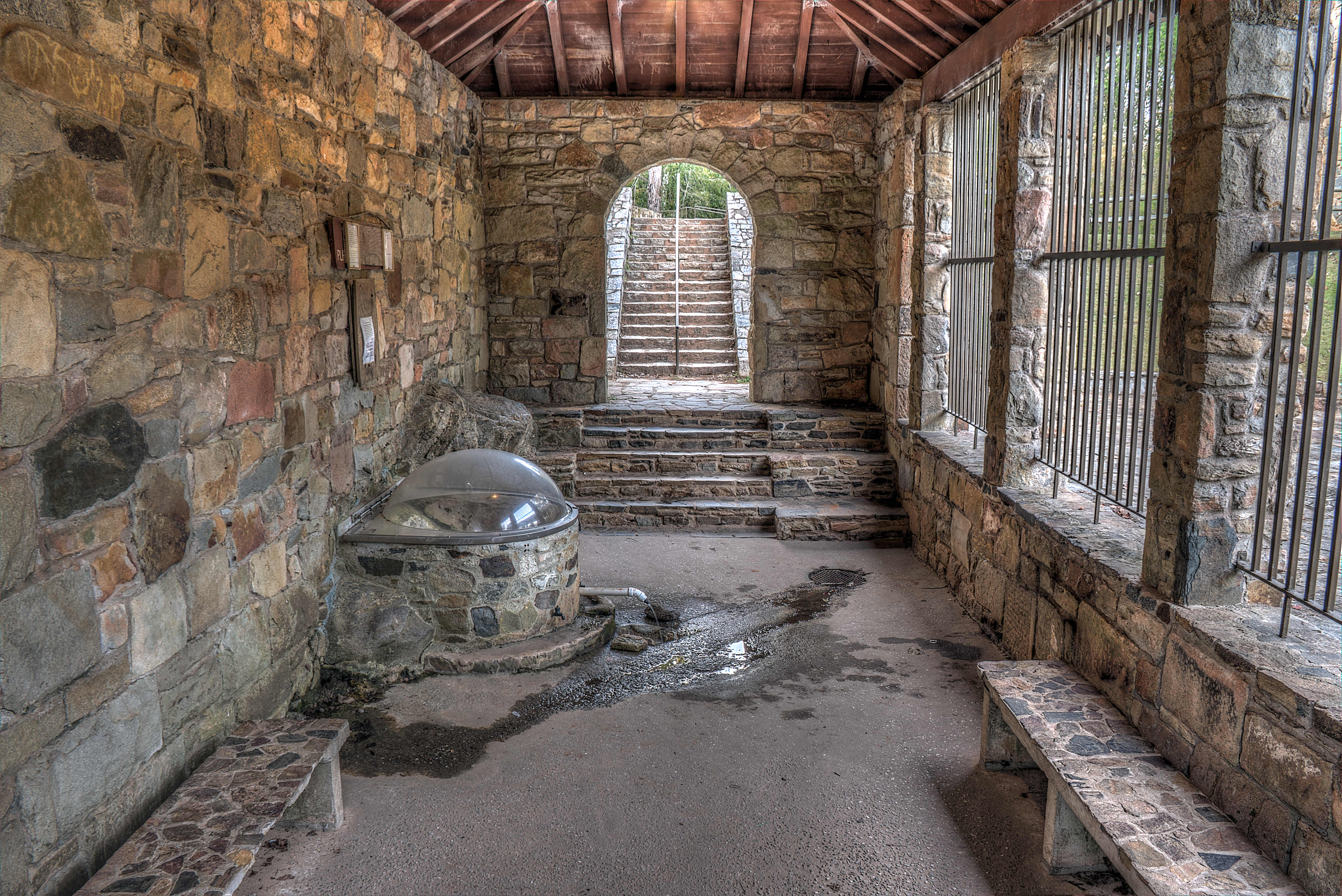
Spring House (interior)

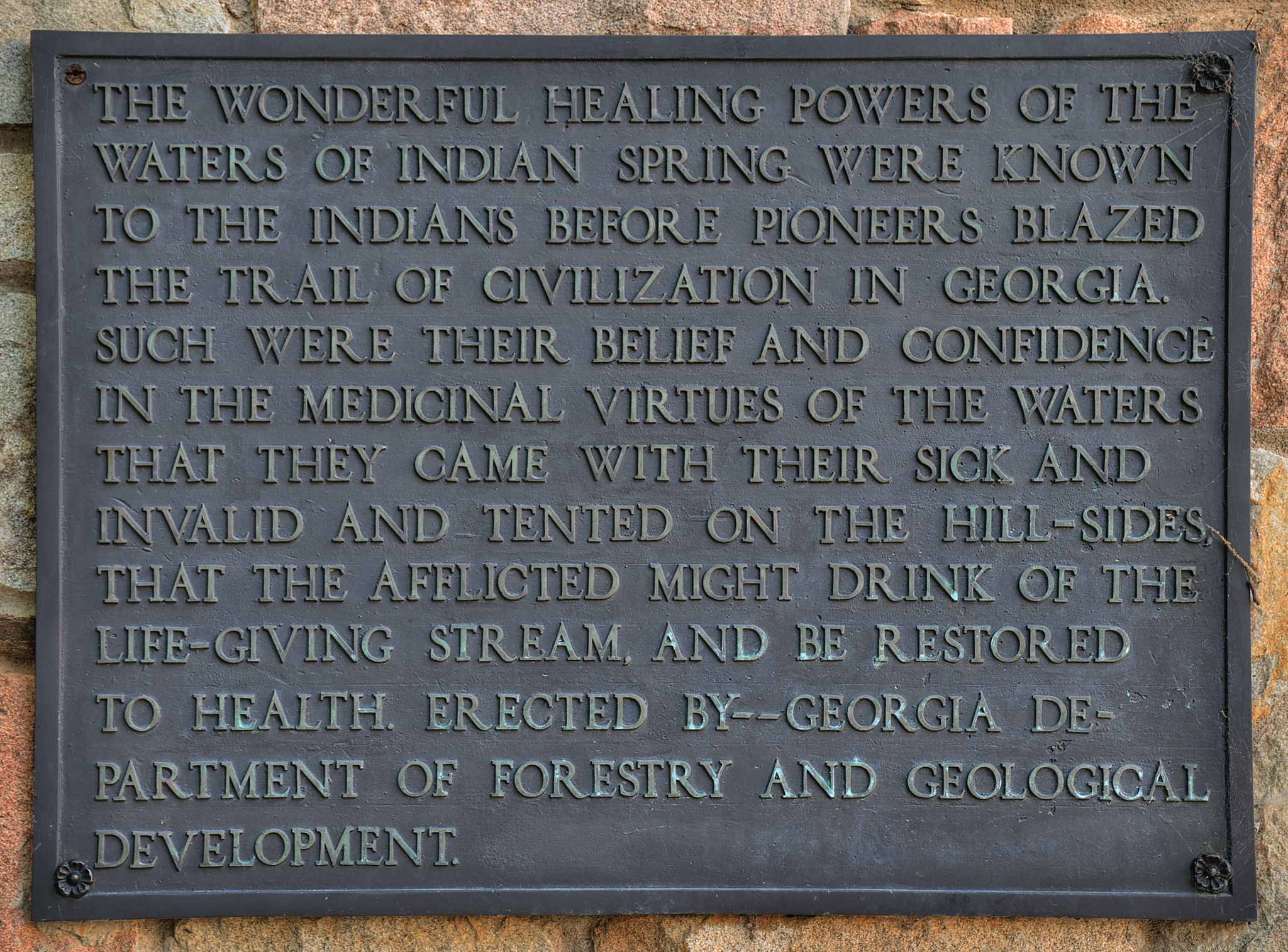
informational sign for Spring House

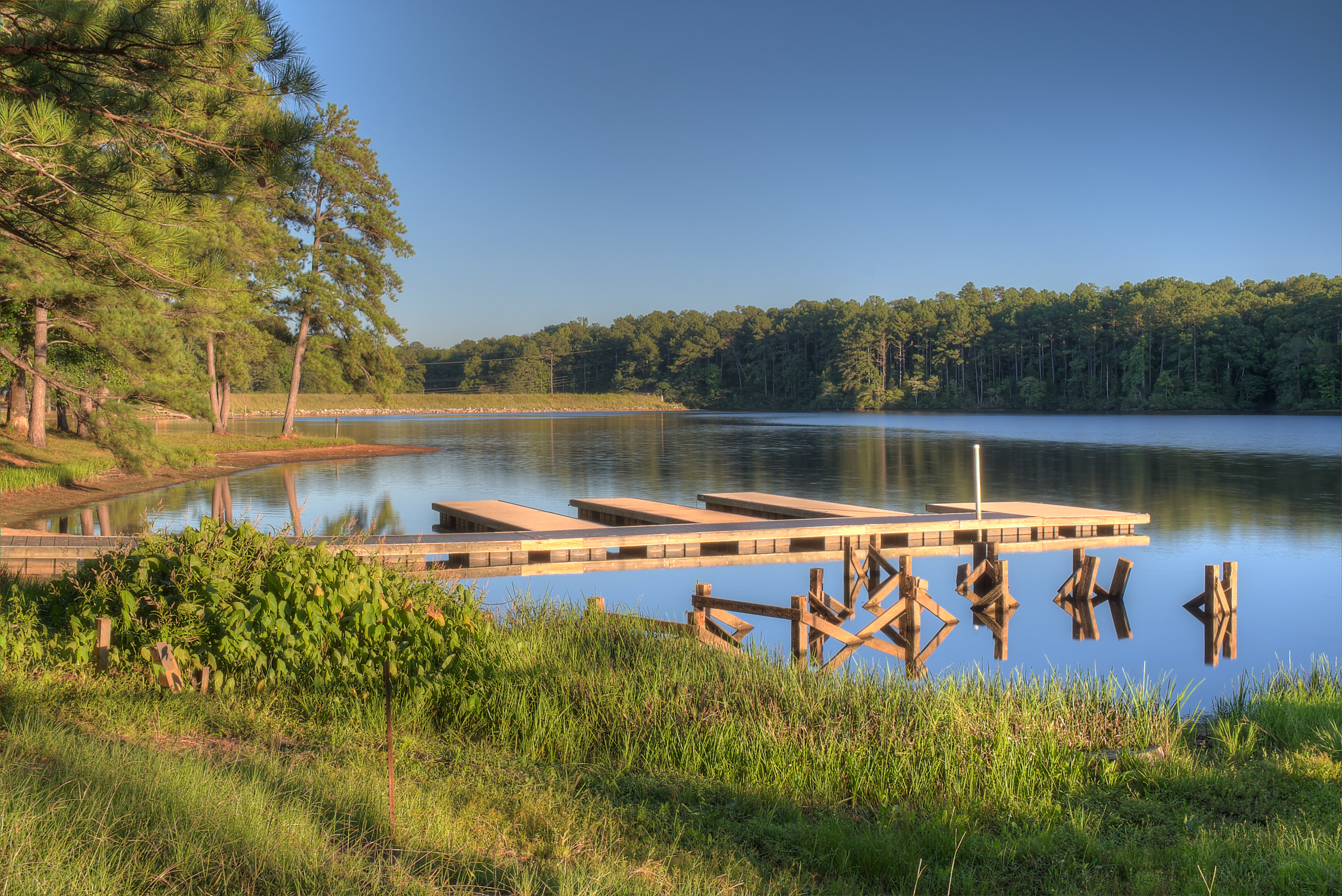
McIntosh Lake

=== Indian Springs State Park Museum ===
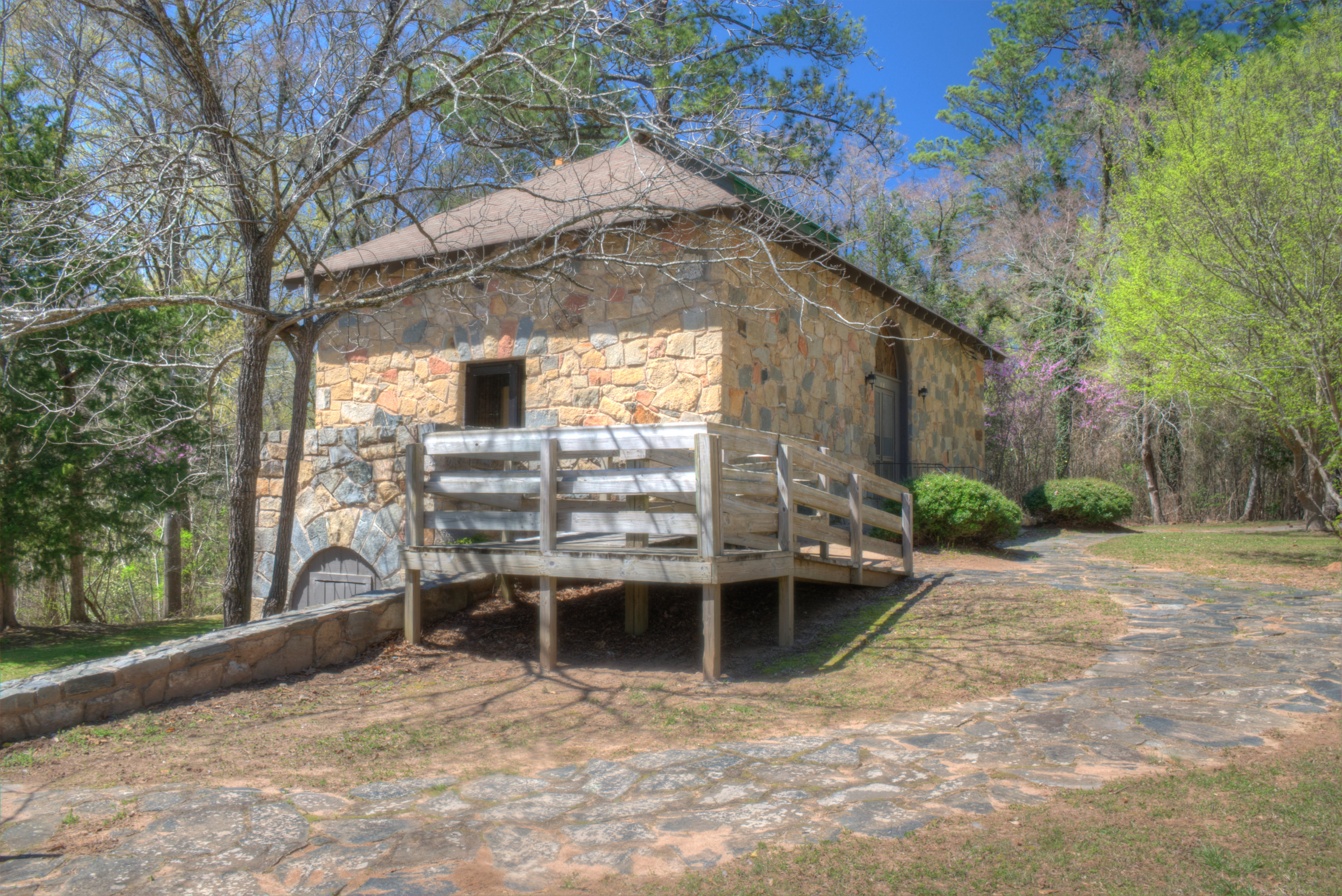
museum

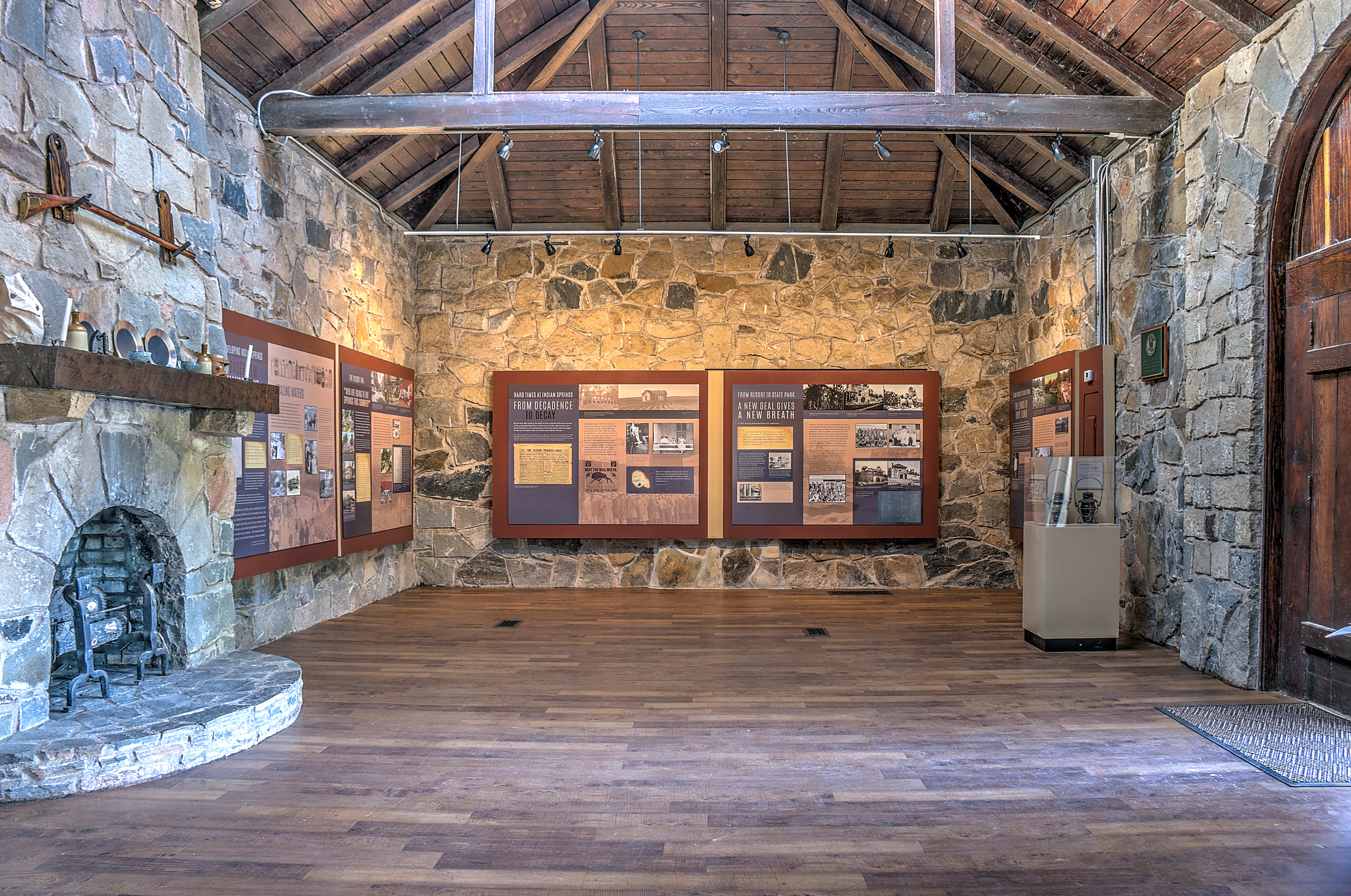
interior of museum

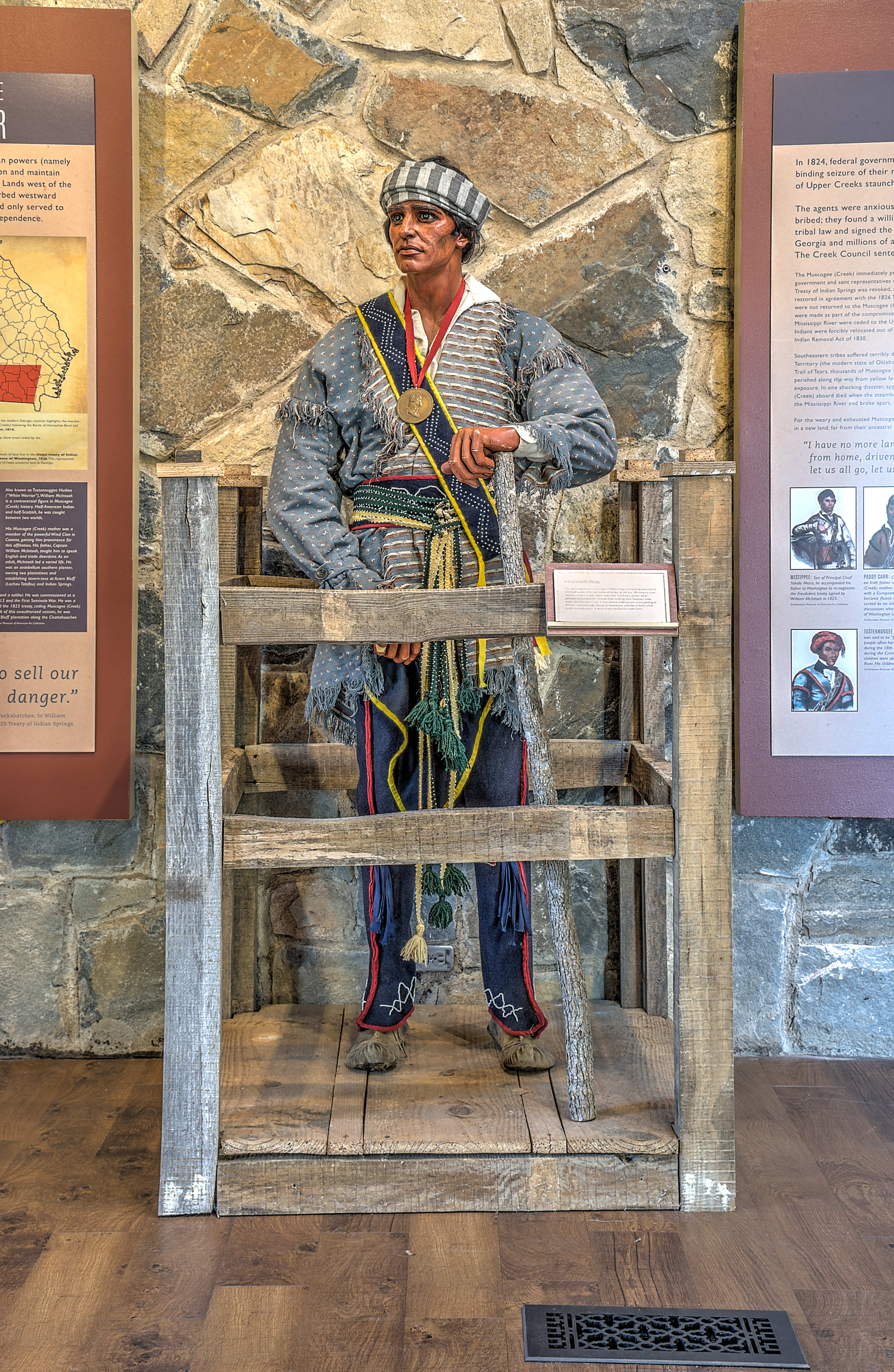
museum exhibit
