= Chattahoochee Bend State Park =

State park in Georgia, United States

- Location within Georgia Location within the United States
- Location: Coweta County, Georgia
- Nearest city: Newnan, Georgia
- Coordinates: 33°25′58″N 84°59′02″W
- Area: 2,910 acres (4.55 sq mi)
- Established: July 1, 2011
- Governing body: Georgia State Park

Chattahoochee Bend State Park is a state park located in Coweta County, Georgia. At 2,910 acres, is one of the state's largest state parks.

== History ==
The state of Georgia first purchased the land for the park in 1999. In 2006, the state approved $7 million for the first phase of park development. Beginning in 2008, the Friends of Chattahoochee Bend organization began hosting work days to aid in the development of the park. The park was opened to the public on July 1, 2011. It was the first new state park to open since Tallulah Gorge State Park in 1993.

== Area ==
The park was named for its location along a bend in the Chattahoochee River. The park includes seven miles of property along the river.

== Facilities and activities ==
As of 2022, the park offers the following facilities and activities for visitors.

- Biking trails (3.2 miles)
- Boat ramp
- Cottages
- Campsites
- Hiking trails (12 miles)
- Paddling
