= Don Carter State Park =

State park located in Hall County, Georgia

- Location within Georgia Location within the United States
- Location: Hall County, Georgia
- Nearest city: Gainesville, Georgia
- Coordinates: 34°23′15″N 83°44′53″W
- Area: 1,316 acres (2.056 sq mi)
- Governing body: Georgia State Park

Don Carter State Park is a state park located in Hall County, Georgia, along the shores of Lake Lanier. It is the only state park along the shores of Lake Lanier. The park offers camping, hiking, and access to the adjacent lake, among other amenities. It was officially opened to the public in 2013. As of 2022, it is Georgia's newest state park.

== History ==
In 1994, the Georgia Department of Natural Resources began the process of land acquisition that would eventually lead to the creation of the park. In 2009, Governor Sonny Perdue signed a budget including $14 million for the construction of the park. Construction officially began in November 2011. The park opened to the public on July 15, 2013. The park is named for Don Carter, a local businessman who served on the Georgia Department of Natural Resources board for 29 years.

== Area ==
Don Carter State Park is the only state park on the shores of Lake Lanier. It is located on the north side of the reservoir.

== Facilities and activities ==
As of 2022, the park offers the following facilities and activities for visitors.

- Boat Ramps
- Cottages
- Campsites
- Docks
- Equestrian trails (14.5 miles)
- Hiking trails (14.5 miles)
- Paddling trails (6 miles)
