= List of parks in Columbus, Georgia =

Below is the list of parks in Columbus, Georgia, United States (this list includes parks, as well as recreation centers, senior centers, and state parks):

== Parks ==
- Anderson Village Park
- Beallwood Park
- Belvedeer Park
- Benning Hills Park
- Bibb Soccer Field Park
- Boxwood Park
- Britt David Park
- Carver Park
- Chattahoochee Promenade Park
- Cooper Creek Park
- Crystal Valley Park
- Dinglewood Park
- Double Churches Park
- Edgewood Park
- Ewart Park
- Flat Rock Park
- Heath Park
- Hemlock Park
- Heritage Park
- Little Wildwood Park
- Michael Fluellen Park
- Ninth Street Park
- North Columbus Park
- Old Dominion Park
- Plez Johnson Park
- Pop Austin Park
- Primus King Park
- Psalmond Road Park
- Rigdon Park
- Roadside Park
- Rosehill Heights Park
- Rotary Park
- Sherwood Park
- Shirley Winston Park
- South Lawyers Lane Park
- South Lumpkin Park
- Theo McGee Park
- Weracoba Park
- Williamsburg Park
- Woodruff Farm Road Park
- Woodruff Park
- Standing Boy Trails

== Recreation centers ==
- 29th Street Recreation Center
- Ardahlia Mack Recreation Center
- Frank D. Chester Recreation Center
- Northside Park Recreation Center

== Senior parks/centers ==
- Edgewood Senior Park
- Fox Senior Center
- Gallops Senior Park
- South Columbus Senior Center
