= Standing Boy Trails =

Park in Columbus, Georgia, United States

- IUCN category III (natural monument or feature)
- Location within Georgia Location within the United States
- Location: Columbus, Georgia, United States
- Coordinates: 32°34′20.33″N 85°2′10.77″W
- Area: 1,579 acres (6.39 km^{2})
- Established: January 21, 2004

Standing Boy Trails is a 1,579 acres (6.39 km^{2}) is a city park and former Georgia state park located in Columbus. The executive order creating the state park was issued by then-Governor Sonny Perdue on January 21, 2004.

== About ==
Standing Boy Trails is located in north Columbus on the shores of the Chattahoochee.

The trail system consists of nearly 30 miles of natural surface trails for hiking, trail running, and mountain biking.

The trails were constructed with over two million dollars of private donations (no government funding or grants) and thousands of volunteer hours. The trails, along with the parking areas and trailheads, are maintained and managed by Standing Boy, Inc., a nonprofit devoted to the property.

Trail Map:https://www.standingboy.org/wp-content/uploads/2024/09/Kiosk_Map_2023_Gravity_coming_soon-2.pdf
