= George Washington Carver Park =

Recreational park in Bartow County, Georgia, US

George Washington Carver State Park
- IUCN category V (protected landscape/seascape)
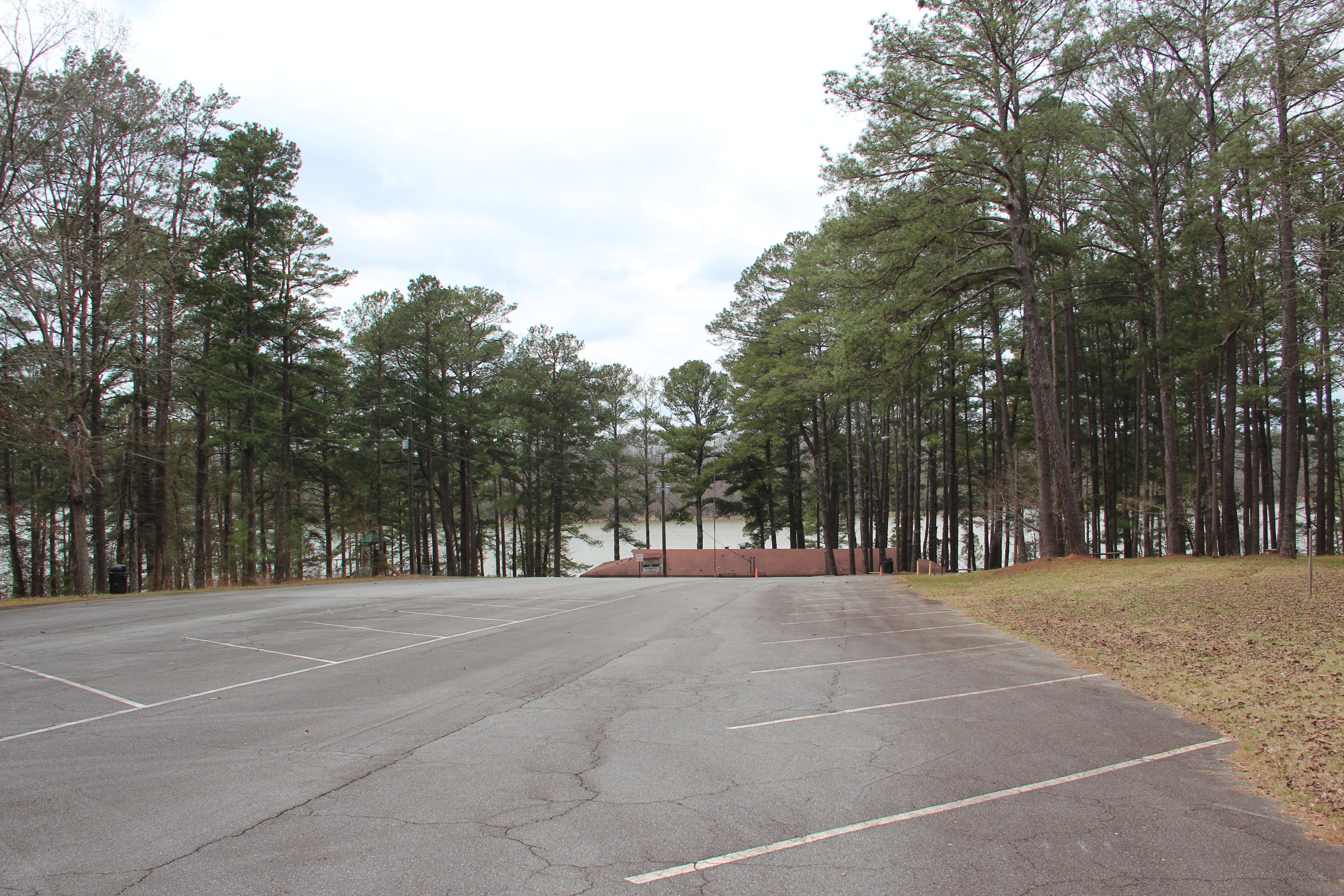
- George Washington Carver State Park (currently known as George Washington Carver Park)
- Interactive map of George Washington Carver State Park
- Location: Bartow County, Georgia, U.S.
- Coordinates: 34°08′21″N 84°40′01″W
- Area: 345 acres (1.4 km^{2})
- Established: 1950
- Disestablished: 1975
- Operator: Bartow County (as George Washington Carver Park)

George Washington Carver State Park was a state park in the U.S. state of Georgia. It existed from 1950 to 1975, when it was then leased to Bartow County as a county park known as Bartow Carver Park, and since 2017 as George Washington Carver Park. Red Top Mountain, located on Lake Allatoona, consists of 1,553 acres (6 km^{2}) and derives its name from the rich red color of the soil that comes from the high iron content in the ground. In 1950, the state initially leased the land for 25 years from the U.S. Army Corps of Engineers. The park served not only to preserve the area's history, but also boost Bartow County's growth and agricultural economy.

== History ==
In 1950, Atlanta resident and former Tuskegee Airman John Loyd Atkinson Sr. was instrumental in establishing George Washington Carver State Park (1950–1975), the state's only park ever named for an African American.

Atkinson had leased the 345 acres (1.4 km^{2}) adjacent to Red Top Mountain State Park from the Corps of Engineers with the intention of establishing a private resort for blacks, like American Beach, Florida. Georgia Governor Herman Talmadge helped establish the park and open it next to Red Top Mountain State Park, although operated and maintained separately. Atkinson became the park superintendent, the first African-American park manager in the state, serving from 1950 to 1958. James Clarence Benham, father of Georgia Supreme Court Justice Robert Benham, became Carver Park's second park manager, serving for three years.
