= Hardman Farm State Historic Site =

Historic site in Georgia state, US

Hardman Farm
- Location in Georgia Location in United States
- 34°41′05″N 83°42′29″W
- Nearest city: Helen, Georgia

History
- Built: 1870
- Built by: Captain James Nichols

Site notes
- Area: 173 acres (70 ha)
- Governing body: Georgia Department of Natural Resources

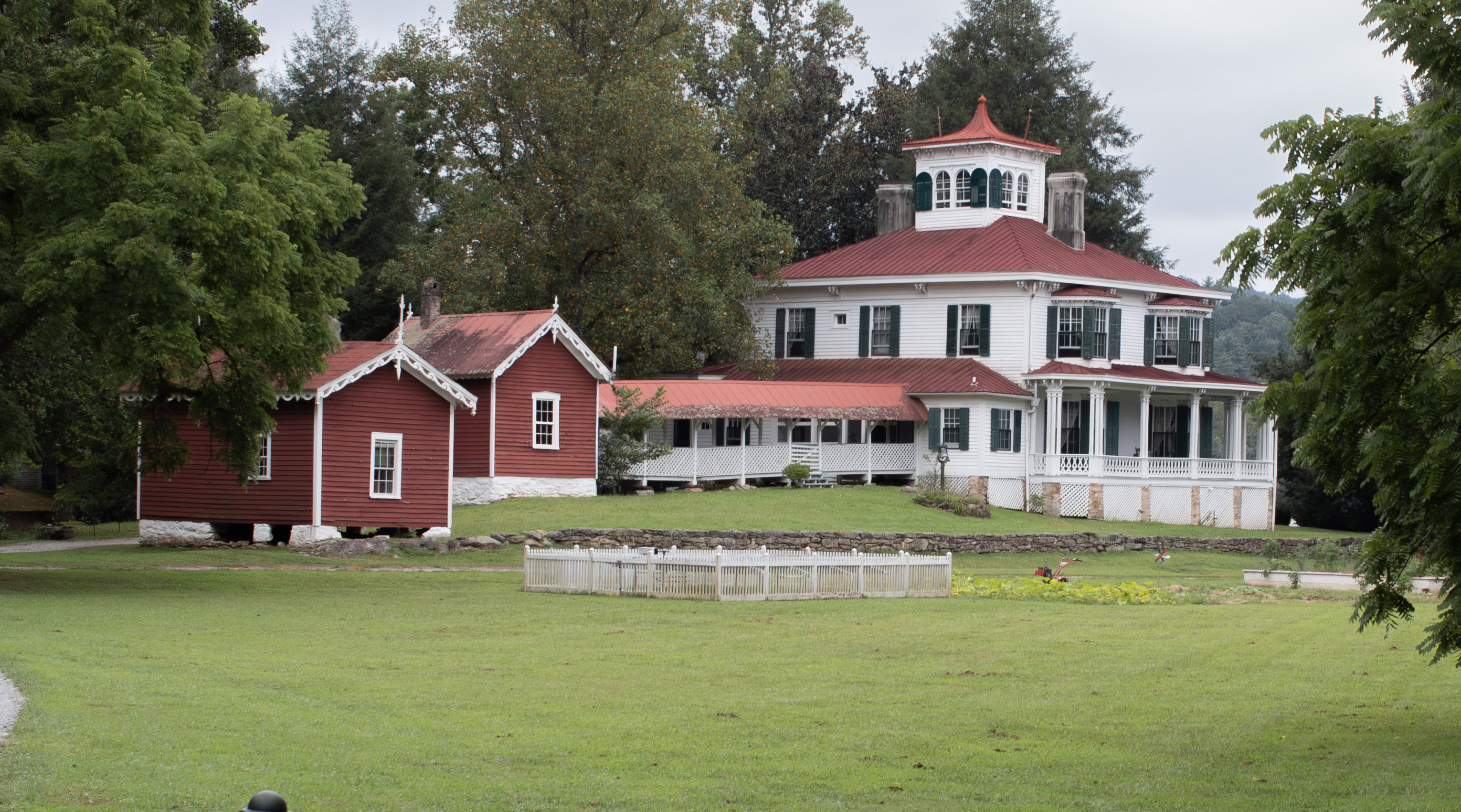
A picture of the Hardman mansion in Nacoochee, Georgia.

Hardman Farm State Historic Site is a Georgia state historic site near Helen, Georgia. The historic site includes an 1870 Italianate mansion and a gazebo-topped Native American burial mound. Other structures include a kitchen, horse barn, dairy barn, and spring house. Capt. James Nichols built the main house in 1870 and the gazebo atop Nacoochee Mound in 1890. His daughter Anna Ruby Nichols is the namesake of Anna Ruby Falls.

In 1893 the home was purchased by Calvin Hunnicutt, a businessman from Atlanta.

Lamartine Griffin Hardman purchased the property in 1903. The property remained in the Hardman family, and was donated to the state of Georgia in 1999.

== Facilities ==
- Sautee Nacoochee Indian Mound
- 1-mile Nature Trail from Hardman Farm to Helen.
- Visitor Center
- Guided mansion tour
