= Weracoba Park =

Park in Columbus, Georgia, United States

- Lakebottom Park
- Interactive map of Weracoba Park
- Location: Columbus, Georgia
- Coordinates: 32.475148°N 84.966222°W
- Manager: Columbus Georgia Parks and Recreation Department
- Open: Year round

Weracoba Park is a public park in Columbus, Georgia. The park is located in Midtown, Columbus, within the Weracoba-St. Elmo Historic District.

== History ==
In 1890, the Columbus Railroad Company first built the park in order to enhance the nearby housing development. The park consisted of a man-made lake containing four islands adorned with picnic shelters surrounded by grassy fields. The railroad company made the lake by damming Weracoba creek. The islands were connected back to shore by way of tall "Japanese-like" bridges adorned with small electric lights. A dance pavilion was also constructed and hosted local bands and orchestras. The park was initially called "Wildwood Park" but was renamed to "Weracoba Park" after the land was purchased by the city government in 1924. The Muscogee word "Weracoba" translates to "Big Water". As a result of the purchase,16 acres of the park was separated in order to construct Columbus High School. In 1926, the park's lake was drained, giving the park the nickname "Lakebottom." The park has been renovated many times since its purchase.

== Amenities ==
The park includes amenities such as Tennis Courts, a Baseball Field, a Soccer Field, a Playground, Walking Trails, and Basketball Courts.
