= Red Top Mountain State Park =

State park in Georgia, United States

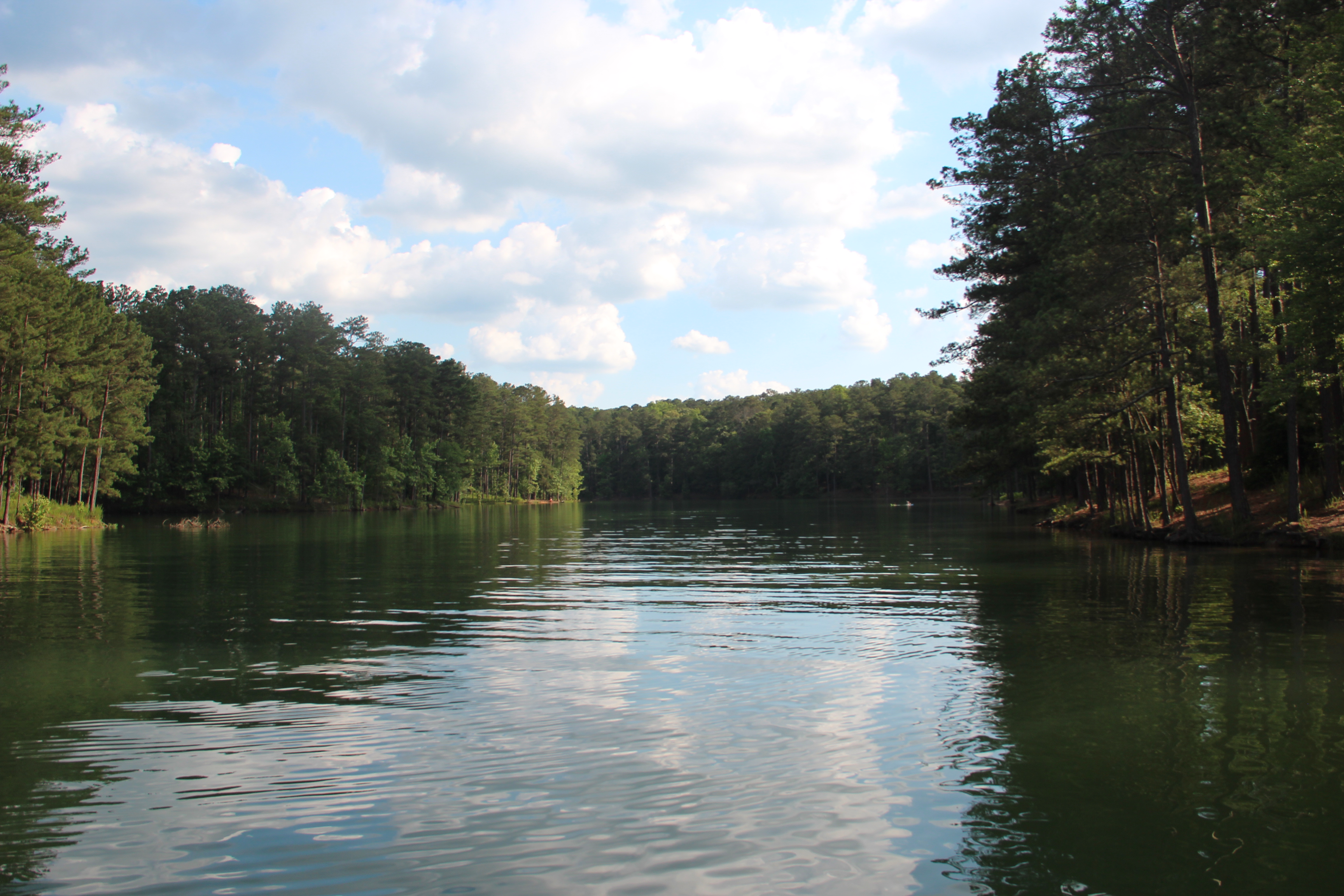
- Lake Allatoona inside Red Top Mountain State Park

- Location within Georgia Location within the United States
- Location: Bartow County, Georgia, USA
- Nearest city: Emerson, Georgia
- Coordinates: 34°09′05″N 84°42′56″W
- Area: 1,776 acres (7.19 km^{2})
- Governing body: Georgia State Park

Red Top Mountain State Park is a state park in the U.S. state of Georgia. It is located in the Northwestern part of the state, on the northwestern edge of metro Atlanta, in Southeastern Bartow County near Cartersville. Named for iron-rich Red Top Mountain, the park covers 1,776 acres (6.32 km^{2}) on a peninsula jutting north into Lake Allatoona, formed on the park's north and east sides by the Etowah River arm and on the west by Allatoona Creek arm.

During the 1864 Atlanta campaign of the American Civil War, the Battle of Allatoona Pass was fought on a battlefield near the park. (The battle of Allatoona Pass National Historical Registry Marker is across Lake Allatoona on the south side, off Allatoona Road, or the Emerson exit off Interstate 75.) The park's main popularity however comes from being near Atlanta, and just off Interstate 75. It is one of the most-visited parks in the state. A modern lodge was constructed in 1985, but closed on June 30, 2010, along with the restaurant and conference rooms due to statewide budget cuts.

== Facilities ==
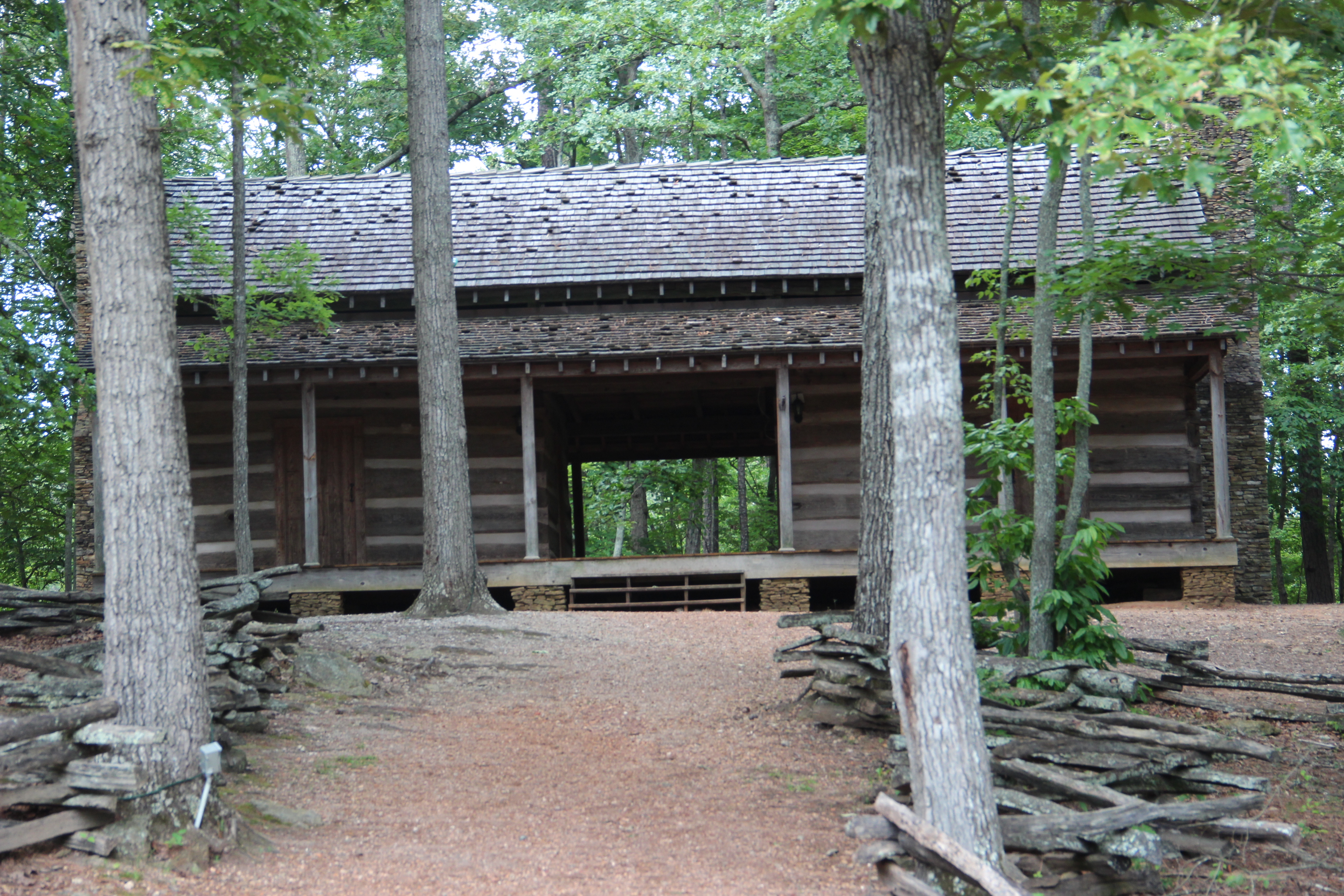
Homestead log cabin

- 36 tent/trailer/RV sites
- 52 Walk-In Campsites
- 6 Yurts
- 18 cottages (sleep 8, available in one-bath or two-bath, 2 dog-friendly cottages available)
- Swimming beach (seasonal)
- Tennis courts
- 7 Picnic shelters
- Two group shelters (seat 100 and 250)
- 1 Pioneer campground

== Annual events ==
- Hills of Iron (March)
- Springtime at the Homestead (April)
- Mountain Music Series (May - July)
- Harvest Time at the Homestead (September)
- Battle of Allatoona Pass (October)

== See also ==
- George Washington Carver State Park
