= National Register of Historic Places listings in Elbert County, Georgia =

This is a list of properties and districts in Elbert County, Georgia that are listed on the National Register of Historic Places (NRHP).

This National Park Service list is complete through NPS recent listings posted March 21, 2025.

== Current listings ==
	Name on the Register	Image	Date listed	Location	City or town	Description
1	Alexander-Cleveland House	Alexander-Cleveland House	September 15, 1977 (#77000423)	3.5 mi. NE of Ruckersville; 34°11′14″N 82°44′12″W	Ruckersville	
2	Ralph Banks Place	Ralph Banks Place	May 22, 1978 (#78000978)	N of Elberton off GA 77; 34°13′37″N 82°51′39″W	Elberton	
3	Bowman Commercial Historic District		April 5, 2016 (#16000128)	Public Square on GA 17; 34°12′18″N 83°01′53″W	Bowman	
4	Building at 6 and 7 Public Square		September 24, 2009 (#09000750)	6 and 7 Public Square; 34°12′18″N 83°01′54″W	Bowman	
5	Asa Chandler House	Asa Chandler House	June 22, 1982 (#82002409)	1003 Old Petersburg Rd. 34°05′41″N 82°50′47″W	Elberton	
6	Dove Creek Baptist Church		July 9, 1987 (#87001154)	GA 72; 34°04′20″N 82°57′05″W	Elberton	demolished
7	Elbert County Courthouse	Elbert County Courthouse	September 18, 1980 (#80001017)	Courthouse Sq. 34°06′36″N 82°52′08″W	Elberton	
8	Elberton Commercial Historic District	Elberton Commercial Historic District	May 20, 1982 (#82002410)	Church, Elbert, Oliver, and McIntosh Sts., and Public Sq.; also N. McIntosh, Thomas, Church, & S. Oliver Sts. 34°06′35″N 82°52′04″W	Elberton	Second set of addresses represents a boundary increase July 14, 2015.
9	Elberton Depot	Elberton Depot	September 11, 1986 (#86002399)	N. Oliver and Deadwyler Sts. 34°06′47″N 82°51′59″W	Elberton	
10	Elberton Residential Historic District	Elberton Residential Historic District	August 11, 1982 (#82002411)	Roughly bounded by Elbert, Oliver, Adams, Thomas, Edwards, and Heard Sts. 34°06′22″N 82°51′55″W	Elberton	
11	Forest Avenue Historic District	Forest Avenue Historic District	March 24, 2015 (#15000102)	Roughly bounded by Jones, Chestnut & W. Church Sts., Laurel & Oak Drs., Brookwood & Lake Forest Cirs., Forest & College; 34°06′42″N 82°52′19″W	Elberton	
12	Ralph Gaines House		October 5, 1977 (#77000422)	N of Elberton on GA 368; 34°12′09″N 82°48′32″W	Elberton	
13	Rock Gym	Rock Gym	December 31, 1998 (#98001559)	45 Forest Ave. 34°06′39″N 82°52′19″W	Elberton	
14	Rucker House		June 23, 1978 (#78000979)	GA 985; 34°09′49″N 82°47′22″W	Ruckersville	

== Former listing ==
	Name on the Register	Image	Date listed	Date removed	Location	City or town	Description
1	William Allen House		June 5, 1975 (#75000591)	September 17, 2015	9 mi. E of Elberton on SR 6; 34°05′49″N 82°43′55″W	Elberton	
