= Ruckersville =

Ruckersville or Ruckerville may refer to:

- Ruckersville, Georgia
- Ruckerville, Kentucky
- Ruckersville, Virginia
