= Huguenot (disambiguation) =

Huguenots was a name given to French Calvinists from the 16th to the 18th century.

Huguenot may also refer to:

- Huguenot, Georgia, a ghost town
- Huguenot, Orange County, New York, a hamlet in the town of Deerpark
- Huguenot, Staten Island, a neighborhood on Staten Island, New York
  - Huguenot (Staten Island Railway station)
- Huguenot, Virginia, an unincorporated community in Powhatan County
- Huguenot, Western Cape, an area in the town of Paarl in South Africa
  - Huguenot railway station (South Africa)
- Les Huguenots, an opera by Giacomo Meyerbeer
