= Gaines House =

Gaines House or Gaines Farm may refer to:

in the United States

(by state then city/town)

- Ralph Gaines House, Elberton, Georgia, listed on the National Register of Historic Places (NRHP) in Elbert County
- Benjamin R. Gaines Farm, Burlington, Kentucky, listed on the NRHP in Boone County
- James Gaines House, Georgetown, Kentucky, listed on the NRHP in Scott County
- Wingate-Gaines Farm District, Petersburg, Kentucky, listed on the NRHP in Boone County
- Col. Abner Gaines House, Walton, Kentucky, listed on the NRHP in Boone County
- McGavock-Gaines House, Franklin, Tennessee, NRHP-listed
- Craig-Beasley House, also known as Gaines House, listed on the NRHP in Williamson County
