= Rock Gym =

Rock Gym may refer to:

- Climbing wall
- Rock Gym (Elberton, Georgia), US, listed on the National Register of Historic Places in Georgia
