= Richard B. Russell State Park =

Park in Elbert County, Georgia, United States

- IUCN category V (protected landscape/seascape)
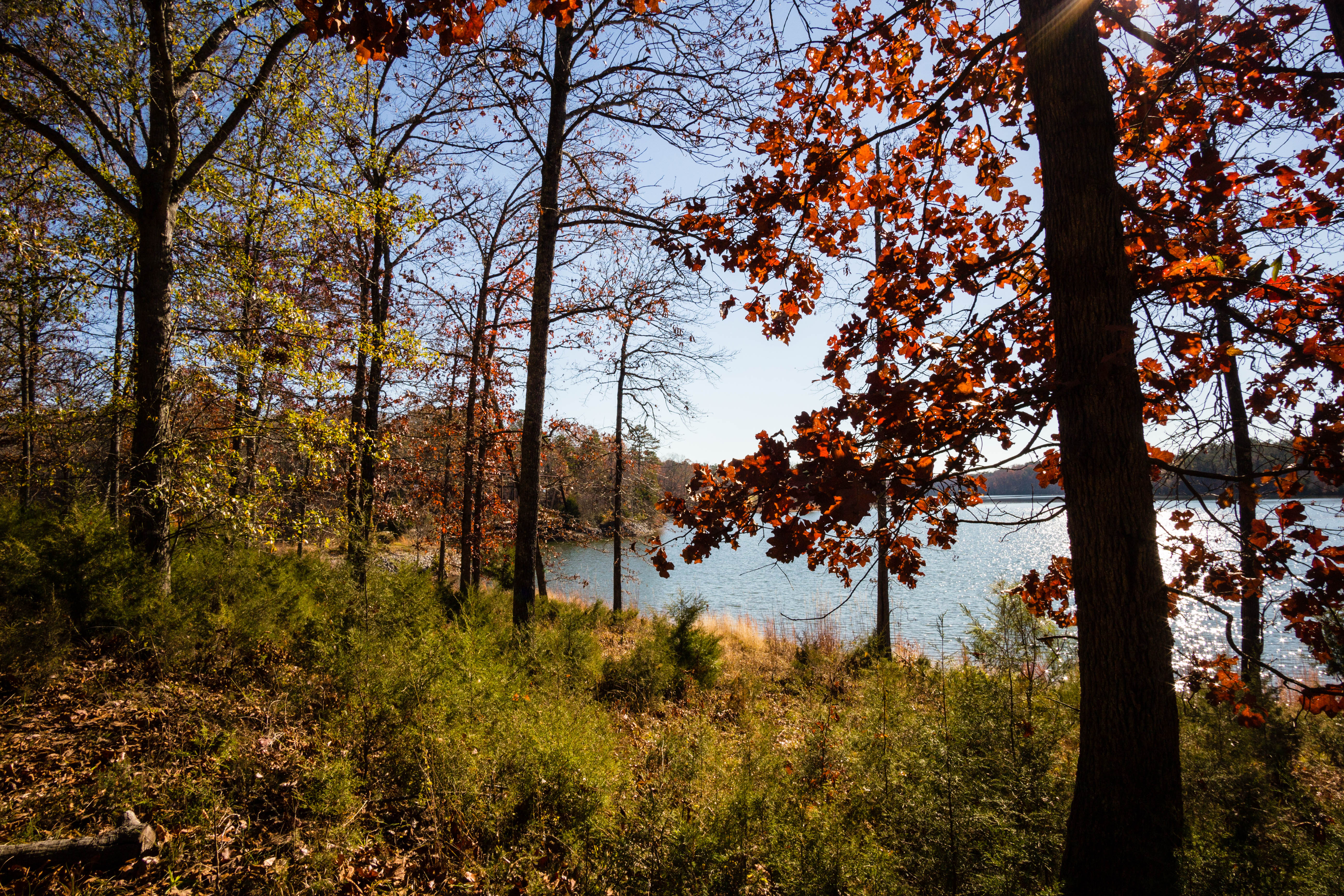
- Richard B. Russell State Park
- Interactive map of Richard B. Russell State Park
- Location: Elbert County, Georgia, U.S.
- Coordinates: 34°10′17″N 82°44′48″W
- Area: 2,508 acres (10.15 km^{2})
- Operator: Georgia State Parks & Historic Sites
- Website: gastateparks.org/RichardBRussell

Richard B. Russell State Park is a 2,508 acres (10.15 km^{2}) state park located on the shore of Richard B. Russell Lake in Elbert County, Georgia. The park features the 18-hole Arrowhead Golf Course, as well as picnic shelters and a swimming beach.

== Facilities ==
- 2,508 Acres
- 28 Tent, Trailer, RV Campsites – cable TV hookups
- 17 Cottages
- Lake and Swimming Beach
- Rowing Area
- 3 Picnic Shelters
- Group Shelter
- 18-Hole Arrowhead Pointe Golf Course and Pro Shop
- 27-Hole Disc Golf Course

== 1996 Summer Olympics ==
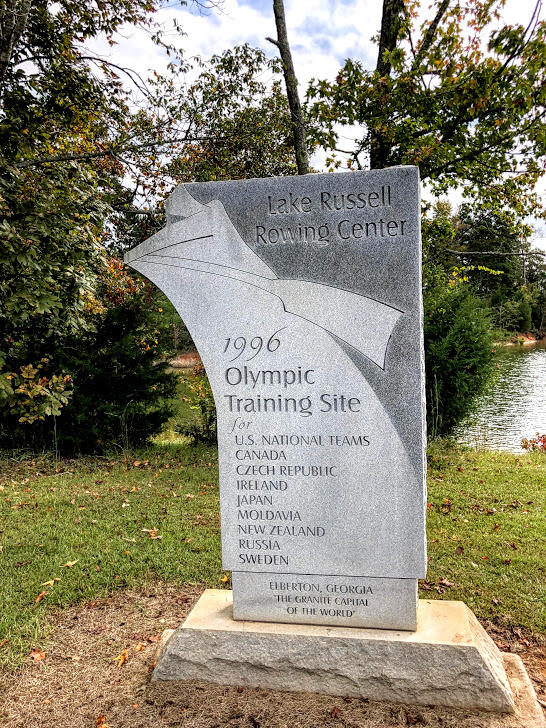
Memorial for 1996 Olympic Training Facility at Richard B. Russell State Park, Elberton, GA.

The town of Elberton, Georgia and Elbert County contributed to the 1996 Summer Olympics by developing a facility to train at Lake Russell for athletes from Canada, the Czech Republic, Ireland, Japan, Moldavia, New Zealand, Russia, Sweden and the United States. Walter McNeely spear-headed the effort and was an Olympic Torchbearer in the 1996 Summer Olympics torch relay. A Pavilion at the Park is named in his memory.
