= Joseph Rucker =

Joseph Rucker may refer to:

- Joseph Rucker (1788–1864), American landholder and slaver, owner of the Rucker House (Ruckersville, Georgia)
- Joseph T. Rucker (1887–1957), American cinematographer
