= Elberton station =

- Elberton Depot
- U.S. National Register of Historic Places
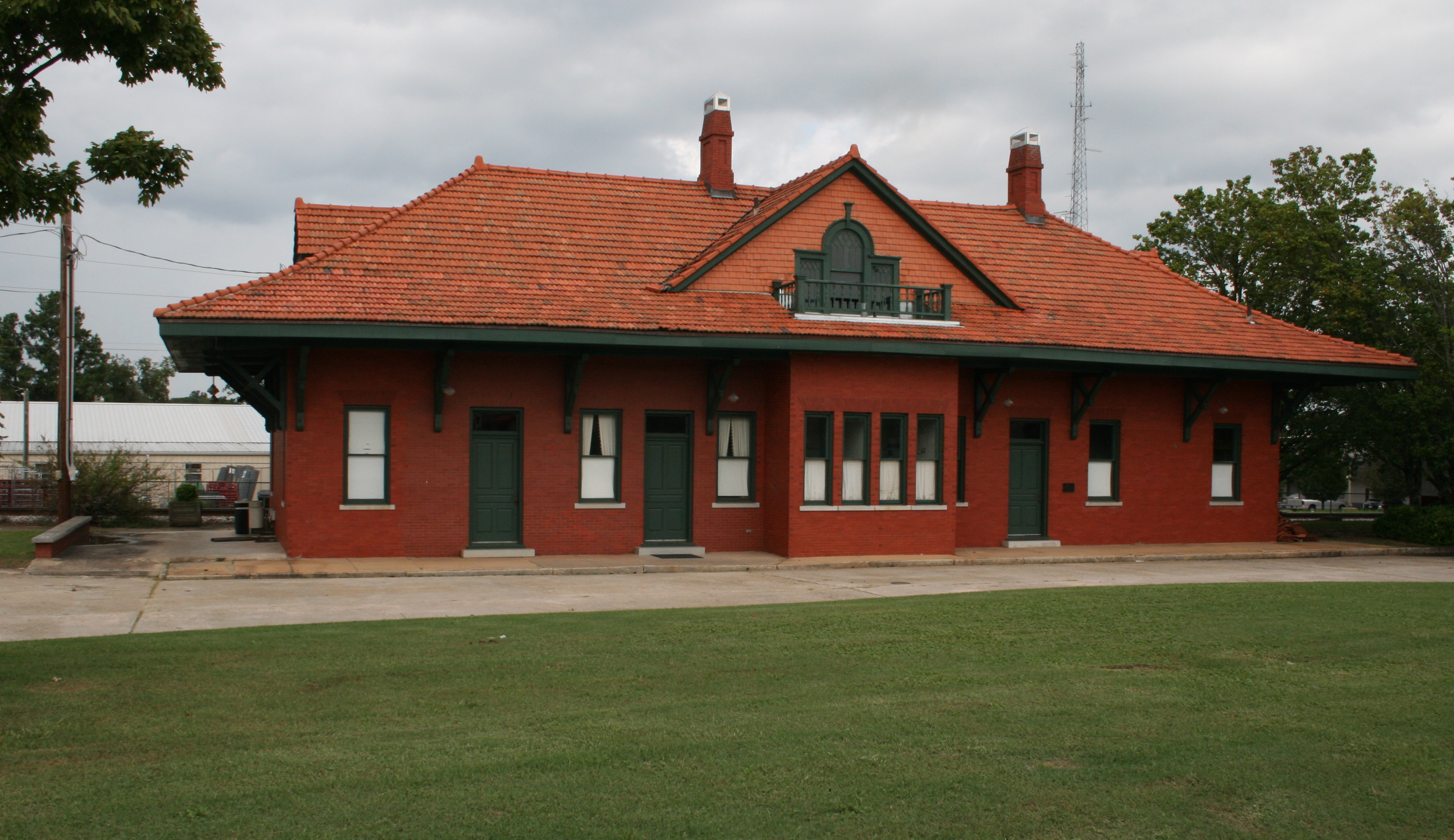
- Elberton Depot

- Location within Georgia
- Location: N. Oliver and Deadwyler Streets; Elberton, Georgia
- Coordinates: 34°6′47″N 82°51′59″W
- Area: less than one acre
- Built: 1910
- Architect: Gathaway Engineering
- NRHP reference No.: 86002399
- Added to NRHP: September 11, 1986

Seaboard Air Line Railway Depot is an historic train depot in Elberton, Georgia. It was added to the National Register of Historic Places in 1986.

It is located at North Oliver Street and Deadwyler Street. It was built in 1910 and served as a Seaboard Air Line passenger station. The station has overhanging eaves supported by large Stick style-brackets.

The station served the SAL's Silver Comet and some passenger, mail and express trains. The last train was the Silver Comet, which was discontinued in 1969. It is now home to the Elbert County Historical Society, and is well preserved.

== See also ==
- National Register of Historic Places listings in Elbert County, Georgia

Preceding station	Seaboard Air Line Railroad	Following station
Oglesby toward Birmingham	Birmingham – Monroe	Middleton toward Monroe
