= Governor Wells =

Governor Wells may refer to:

- Heber Manning Wells (1859–1938), 1st Governor of Utah
- Henry H. Wells (1823–1900), Provisional Governor of Virginia from 1868 to 1869
- Humphrey Wells (fl. 1770s–1780s), Governor of Georgia for two days in 1780
- James Madison Wells (1808–1899), 20th Governor of Louisiana
- Samuel Wells (1801–1868), 25th Governor of Maine

== See also ==
- Thomas Welles (1590–1660), 17th and 20th Governor of the Colony of Connecticut
