= Elbert County High School =

Public comprehensive high school in Elbert County, Georgia, United States

Location
- 600 Abernathy Circle; Elberton, Elbert County, Georgia 30635; United States; 34°6′29″N 82°53′5″W

Information
- Type: Public high school
- School district: Elbert County School District
- Superintendent: Robert Wheeler
- Principal: Josh Rider
- Teaching staff: 57.30 (FTE)
- Grades: 9–12
- Enrollment: 945 (2023–2024)
- Student to teacher ratio: 16.49
- Campus type: Rural
- Colors: Navy and white
- Mascot: Blue Devil
- Newspaper: The BluePrint
- Feeder schools: Elbert County Middle School
- Website: School website

Elbert County High School is a four-year public comprehensive high school located in Elbert County, Georgia, United States. It serves the students of Elberton and Elbert County. The school colors are navy and white. The Blue Devils compete in GHSA Region 8-A. The school's operation hours are 7:55 am–2:55 pm.

== Notable alumni ==
- Clark Gaines, NFL running back
- Mecole Hardman, NFL wide receiver
