= Governor Davis =

Governor Davis may refer to:

- Adrian Davis (governor), Governor of Montserrat from 2011 to 2015
- Cushman Kellogg Davis (1838–1900), Governor of Minnesota
- D. W. Davis (1873–1959), Governor of Idaho
- Daniel F. Davis (1843–1897), Governor of Maine
- Deane C. Davis (1900–1990), Governor of Vermont
- Dwight F. Davis (1879–1945), Governor-General of the Philippines
- Ed Davis (Royal Marines officer) (born 1963), Governor of Gibraltar (2016–2020)
- Edmund J. Davis (1827–1883), Governor of Texas
- George Whitefield Davis (1839–1918), Military Governor of Puerto Rico, Military Governor of Panama Canal Zone
- Gray Davis (born 1942), Governor of California
- Harry L. Davis (1878–1950), Governor of Ohio
- Jeff Davis (Arkansas governor) (1862–1913), Governor of Arkansas
- Jimmie Davis (1899–2000), Governor of Louisiana
- John E. Davis (North Dakota politician) (1913–1990), Governor of North Dakota
- John Francis Davis (1795–1890), 2nd Governor of Hong Kong from 1844 to 1848
- John W. Davis (governor) (1826–1907), Governor of Rhode Island
- John Wesley Davis (1799–1859), 4th Governor of Oregon Territory
- John Davis (Massachusetts governor) (1787–1854), Governor of Massachusetts
- Jonathan M. Davis (1871–1943), Governor of Kansas
- Westmoreland Davis (1859–1942), Governor of Virginia

== See also ==
- Jehu Davis (1738–1802), President of Delaware
- Myrick Davies (died 1781), Governor of Georgia
