= Hard Cash =

Hard Cash may refer to:

- Hard Cash (novel), 1863 novel by Charles Reade about the poor treatment of patients in private insane asylums
  - Hard Cash, a 2-reel 1913 American silent film based on the Reade novel, directed by Charles M. Seay
  - Hard Cash, a 1921 British silent film based on the Reade novel, directed by Edwin J. Collins
- Hard Cash (2002 film), an action film about an armed robbery
- Hard Cash, Georgia, an unincorporated community in Elbert County, Georgia, United States
- hard cash, a term referring to money in the form of coins or banknotes.

== See also ==
- Hardcash Productions, a current affairs TV production company
