= Jake Lowery =

American baseball player and coach (born 1990)

- Catcher/Manager
- Born: July 21, 1990 (age 35); Midlothian, Virginia, U.S.
- Bats: Left Throws: Right
- Stats at Baseball Reference

Career highlights and awards
- Johnny Bench Award (2011)

Mark Jacob Lowery (born July 21, 1990) is an American professional baseball coach and former baseball catcher who is the manager for the Wilmington Blue Rocks. Prior to playing professionally, Lowery played college baseball for James Madison University.

== Amateur career ==
Lowery played Little League Baseball in Huguenot, Virginia. At the age of 13, he began playing for travel baseball teams during the summer.

Lowery attended Cosby High School in Midlothian, Virginia, and played for the school's baseball team. In his senior year, he had a .381 batting average with seven home runs, 28 runs batted in (RBIs), and 40% caught stealing percentage. He enrolled at James Madison University, where he played college baseball for the James Madison Dukes in the Colonial Athletic Association (CAA). He was named a second team All-CAA catcher as a sophomore. In 2011, his junior year, Lowery batted .359 with 24 home runs and 91 RBIs. Lowery was named the CAA Player of the Year and a first team All-CAA catcher, while he was named an All-American by Collegiate Baseball and Baseball America. In 2011, Lowery won the Johnny Bench Award, given to the best catcher in college baseball.

== Professional career ==
=== Cleveland Indians ===
The Cleveland Indians selected Lowery in the fourth round of the 2011 Major League Baseball draft. After he signed with the Indians, Lowery was assigned to the Mahoning Valley Scrappers of the Low–A New York–Penn League, where he batted .245 with six home runs and 43 RBI in 69 games. He was the 17th best prospect according to Baseball America. In 2012, Lowery played for the Lake County Captains of the Single–A Midwest League and the Carolina Mudcats of the High–A Carolina League, where he combined to hit nine home runs with 53 RBI. He began the 2013 season with Carolina, and was promoted to the Akron RubberDucks of the Double–A Eastern League in late April. The Indians invited Lowery to spring training in 2014, and assigned him Akron. The Indians invited Lowery to spring training in 2015. Lowery was released by the Indians on March 28, 2016.

=== Washington Nationals ===
On April 14, 2016, Lowery signed a minor league contract with the Washington Nationals organization.

Lowery split the 2018 campaign between the Double–A Harrisburg Senators and Triple–A Syracuse Chiefs, batting .244/.359/.397 with three home runs and 16 RBI. He elected free agency following the season on November 2, 2018.

On March 14, 2019, Lowery re–signed with Washington on a minor league pact. He spent the year with Double–A Harrisburg, batting .222/.364/.333 with two RBI across 12 appearances. Lowery elected free agency following the season on November 4.

On November 7, 2019, Lowery once more re-signed with the Nationals organization on a new minor league contract. He did not play in a game in 2020 due to the cancellation of the minor league season because of the COVID-19 pandemic. Lowery became a free agent on November 2, 2020.

== Coaching career ==
In 2021, Lowery served as the manager of the Florida Complex League Nationals. In 2022, he was promoted to manager of the Fredericksburg Nationals of the Low-A Carolina League. On December 19, 2024, he was promoted to serve as the manager of the High-A Wilmington Blue Rocks.

On January 29, 2026, Lowery was announced as a catching and game play coordinator within the Washington Nationals' player development department.

== Personal life ==
Lowery's younger brother, Luke, played college baseball for East Carolina University. Their father, Tim, is the baseball coach at Cosby High School. Their mother, Lori, is a high school Spanish teacher.
