= Bobby Brown Park =

Recreation area in Georgia, United States

- Location within Georgia Location within the United States
- Location: Elbert County, Georgia
- Nearest city: Chennault, Georgia
- Coordinates: 33°58′27″N 82°34′44″W
- Area: 665 acres (1.039 sq mi)
- Governing body: Elbert County, Georgia local government

Bobby Brown Park, formerly known as Bobby Brown State Outdoor Recreation Area and prior to that Bobby Brown State Park, is a 665-acre (2.69 km^{2}) park located near Elbert County and Middleton. The park's name is a memorial to Robert T. Brown a lieutenant in the United States Navy who was killed during World War II aboard the submarine USS Scorpion. He was the son of Paul Brown (Georgia politician) of Elberton, Ga.

The park is located on a plot of land that was once Petersburg, a small town that thrived during the 1790s due to its location where the Broad River and Savannah River met. The park is now located next to both Lake Strom Thurmond and Richard B. Russell Lake, two manmade reservoirs. When water levels are low, however, the old town of Petersburg can once again be glimpsed by visitors. The park's strategic location near so much water provides much fishing and water recreation.

== History ==
Bobby Brown State Park was downgraded to Bobby Brown State Outdoor Recreation Area in 2009. In 2015, a lease agreement was reached with the Georgia Department of Natural Resources. The park is now operated by the government of Elbert County, Georgia.

== Facilities ==
- 61 Tent/Trailer/RV Sites
- Pioneer Camping
- Boat Ramp and Dock
- 2 Picnic Shelters
