= Governor Heard =

Governor Heard may refer to:

- Stephen Heard (1740–1815), Governor of Georgia from 1780 to 1781
- William Wright Heard (1853–1926), 32nd Governor of Louisiana
