= Coldwater, Georgia =

Unincorporated community in Georgia, U.S.

Coordinates: 34°13′23″N 82°47′50″W

Coldwater is an unincorporated community in Elbert County, in the U.S. state of Georgia.

== History ==
The community took its name from a local Methodist church, which in turn was named after Coldwater Creek.
