= William Crawford (judge) =

American judge (1784–1849)

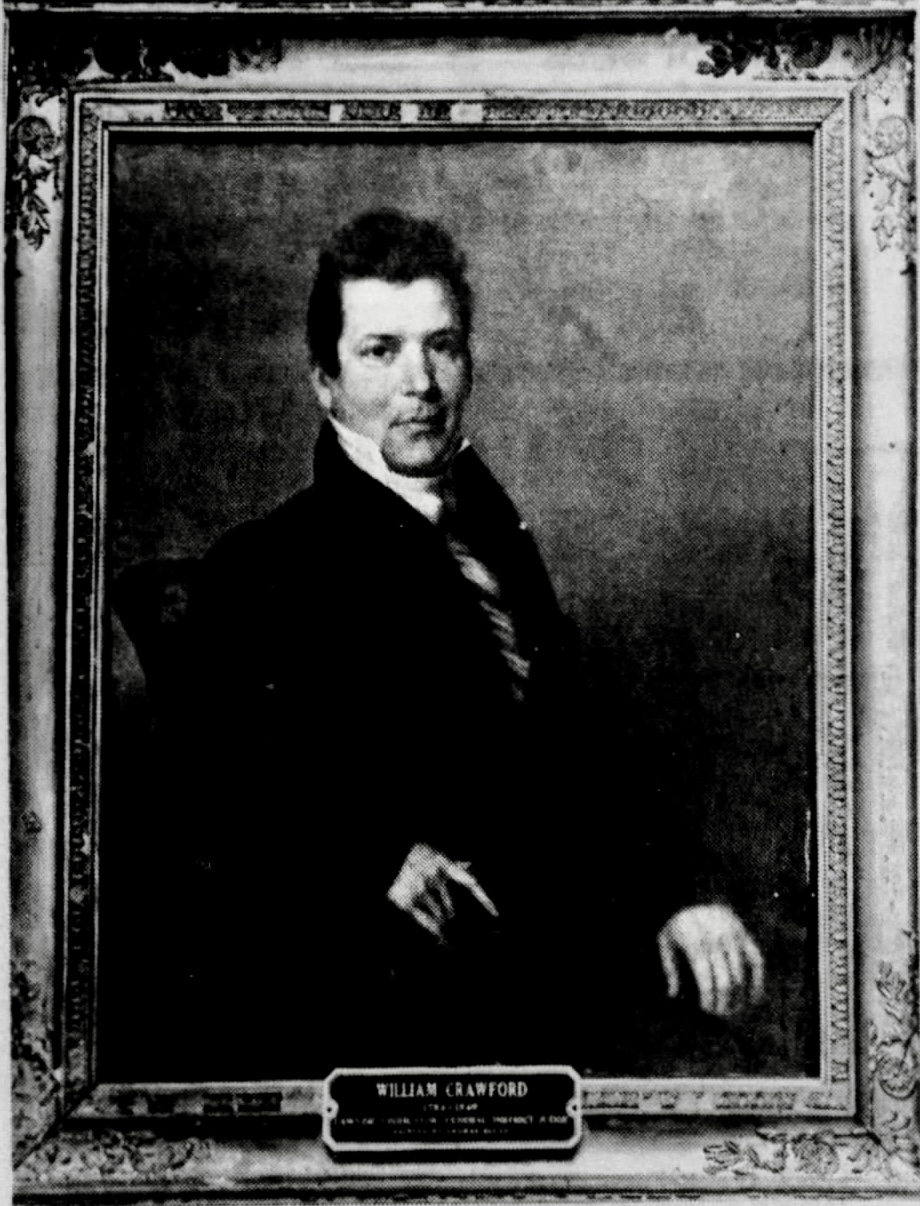

Judge of the United States District Court for the Middle District of Alabama
- In office February 6, 1839 – February 28, 1849
- Appointed by: operation of law
- Preceded by: Seat established by 5 Stat. 315
- Succeeded by: John Gayle

Judge of the United States District Court for the Northern District of Alabama Judge of the United States District Court for the Southern District of Alabama
- In office May 22, 1826 – February 28, 1849
- Appointed by: John Quincy Adams
- Preceded by: Charles Tait
- Succeeded by: John Gayle

Personal details
- Born: William Crawford; 1784 Louisa County, Virginia
- Died: February 28, 1849 (aged 64–65) Mobile, Alabama
- Education: Hampden–Sydney College read law

William Crawford (1784 – February 28, 1849) was a United States district judge of the United States District Court for the Middle District of Alabama, the United States District Court for the Northern District of Alabama and the United States District Court for the Southern District of Alabama.

== Education and career ==
Born in 1784 in Louisa County, Virginia, Crawford attended Hampden–Sydney College and read law. He entered private practice, then served as a land commissioner in Florida. He was a Virginia militia lieutenant from 1812 to 1814, during the War of 1812. He was a land commissioner in Louisiana starting in 1812. He was United States Attorney for the District of Mississippi Territory starting in 1814. He was United States Attorney for the District of Alabama from 1817 to 1824. He was United States Attorney for the Southern District of Alabama from 1824 to 1826. He resumed private practice in St. Stephens, Alabama. He was clerk of the United States District Court for the District of Alabama. He was a member of the Alabama Senate from 1825 to 1826.

== Federal judicial service ==
Crawford was nominated by President John Quincy Adams on May 5, 1826, to a joint seat on the United States District Court for the Northern District of Alabama and the United States District Court for the Southern District of Alabama vacated by Judge Charles Tait. He was confirmed by the United States Senate on May 22, 1826, and received his commission the same day. Crawford was assigned by operation of law to additional and concurrent service on the United States District Court for the Middle District of Alabama on February 6, 1839, to a new seat authorized by 5 Stat. 315. His service terminated on February 28, 1849, due to his death in Mobile, Alabama.

== Sources ==
Legal offices
Preceded by Charles Tait	Judge of the United States District Court for the Northern District of Alabama; Judge of the United States District Court for the Southern District of Alabama; 1826–1849	Succeeded by John Gayle
Preceded by Seat established by 5 Stat. 315	Judge of the United States District Court for the Middle District of Alabama; 1839–1849	Succeeded by John Gayle
