= Mammy Kate =

Mammy Kate was a woman enslaved by Stephen Heard (1740–1815), the future Governor of Georgia. She lived in what was then Wilkes County, Georgia, now Elbert County, Georgia.

In an 1820 letter, she was said to be the "biggest and tallest" Black woman the writer had ever seen and had "proven herself to be a strong, a kindly, a never failing friend to Colonel Heard and his family." Of pure African descent, she claimed to be the daughter of a great king.

Heard suffered a great deal at the hands of the Loyalists. They forced his wife out into a snowstorm, and she and their young, adopted daughter died from exposure. Then he was captured by the Loyalists and sentenced to death.

Ostensibly to care for his needs, Kate followed him to his prison. One morning, she presented herself with a large covered basket on her head. Telling the sentry on duty that she was there to pick up Heard's soiled linen, she was admitted to his cell. There, she put Heard, a small man, in the basket and calmly sauntered past the guard with him in the basket balanced on her head.

The previous night, she had secreted two of Heard's Arabian horses—Lightfoot and Silverheels—on the outskirts of Augusta, Georgia, where he was imprisoned. She carried Heard to where she had hidden the horses, and she and Heard rode away. On the ride, he offered to set her free, but she told him that he could set her free, but she would never set him free.

Heard gave Kate freedom and a deed to a small tract of land and a four-roomed house, but she continued to work for the Heard family, turning over on her death-bed her children to his family.
