= Elbert County, Georgia =

County in Georgia, United States

- County
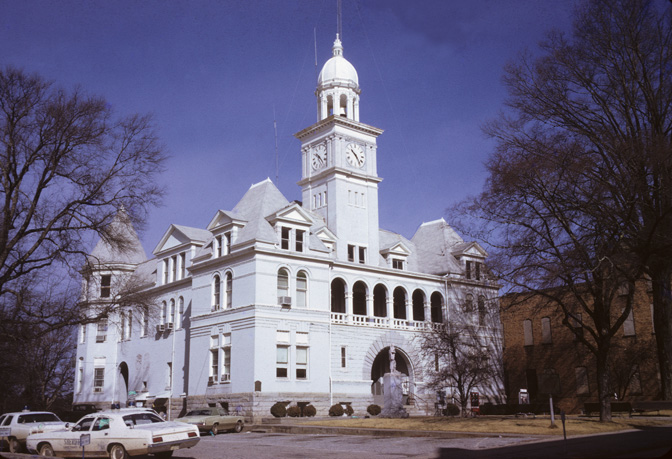
- Elbert County courthouse in Elberton, 1973

- Location within the U.S. state of Georgia
- Coordinates: 34°07′N 82°50′W
- Country: United States
- State: Georgia
- Founded: 1790; 236 years ago
- Named for: Samuel Elbert
- Seat: Elberton
- Largest city: Elberton

Area
  - Total: 374 sq mi (970 km^{2})
  - Land: 351 sq mi (910 km^{2})
  - Water: 23 sq mi (60 km^{2}) 6.2%

Population (2020)
  - Total: 19,637
  - Estimate (2025): 20,072 ▲
  - Density: 56/sq mi (22/km^{2})
- Time zone: UTC−5 (Eastern)
  - Summer (DST): UTC−4 (EDT)
- Congressional district: 9th
- Website: www.elbertga.us

Elbert County is a county located in the northeastern part of the U.S. state of Georgia. As of the 2020 census, the population was 19,637. The county seat is Elberton. The county was established on December 10, 1790, and was named for Samuel Elbert.

== Geography ==
According to the U.S. Census Bureau, the county has a total area of 374 square miles (970 km^{2}), of which 351 square miles (910 km^{2}) is land and 23 square miles (60 km^{2}) (6.2%) is water. The county is located in the Piedmont region of the state.

The northern half of Elbert County, north of a line made by following State Route 17 from Bowman southeast to Elberton, and then following State Route 72 east to just before the South Carolina border, and then heading south along the shores of Lake Richard B. Russell & Clarkes Hill to the county's southeastern tip, is located in the Upper Savannah River sub-basin of the larger Savannah River basin. The portion of the county south of this line is located in the Broad River sub-basin of the Savannah River basin.

=== Major highways ===
- State Route 17
- State Route 72
- State Route 77
  - State Route 77 Connector
- State Route 79
- State Route 172
- State Route 368

=== Adjacent counties ===
- Anderson County, South Carolina (northeast)
- Abbeville County, South Carolina (east)
- McCormick County, South Carolina (southeast)
- Lincoln County (southeast)
- Wilkes County (south)
- Oglethorpe County (southwest)
- Madison County (west)
- Hart County (north)

== Communities ==
=== Cities ===
- Bowman
- Elberton

=== Census-designated place ===
- Dewy Rose

=== Unincorporated communities ===
- Beverly
- Centerville
- Coldwater
- Hard Cash
- Heardmont
- Montevideo
- Rice Town
- Rock Branch
- Ruckersville

=== Ghost town ===
- Huguenot
- Petersburg

== Demographics ==
Historical population
Census	Pop.	Note	%±
1800	10,094		—
1810	12,156		20.4%
1820	11,788		−3.0%
1830	12,354		4.8%
1840	11,125		−9.9%
1850	12,959		16.5%
1860	10,433		−19.5%
1870	9,249		−11.3%
1880	12,957		40.1%
1890	15,376		18.7%
1900	19,729		28.3%
1910	24,125		22.3%
1920	23,905		−0.9%
1930	18,485		−22.7%
1940	19,618		6.1%
1950	18,585		−5.3%
1960	17,835		−4.0%
1970	17,262		−3.2%
1980	18,758		8.7%
1990	18,949		1.0%
2000	20,511		8.2%
2010	20,166		−1.7%
2020	19,637		−2.6%
2025 (est.)	20,072	▲	2.2%
U.S. Decennial Census; 1790–1880 1890–1910; 1920–1930 1930–1940; 1940–1950 1960–1980; 1980–2000 2010

=== 2020 census ===
As of the 2020 census, there were 19,637 people and 5,065 families residing in the county. The median age was 44.8 years; 21.1% of residents were under the age of 18 and 22.1% of residents were 65 years of age or older.

For every 100 females there were 91.9 males, and for every 100 females age 18 and over there were 88.3 males age 18 and over. 29.0% of residents lived in urban areas, while 71.0% lived in rural areas.

The racial makeup of the county was 65.3% White, 26.9% Black or African American, 0.3% American Indian and Alaska Native, 0.9% Asian, 0.0% Native Hawaiian and Pacific Islander, 2.6% from some other race, and 3.9% from two or more races. Hispanic or Latino residents of any race comprised 5.1% of the population.

There were 8,016 households in the county, of which 28.7% had children under the age of 18 living with them and 31.4% had a female householder with no spouse or partner present. About 28.8% of all households were made up of individuals and 14.6% had someone living alone who was 65 years of age or older.

There were 9,248 housing units, of which 13.3% were vacant. Among occupied housing units, 71.5% were owner-occupied and 28.5% were renter-occupied. The homeowner vacancy rate was 1.3% and the rental vacancy rate was 6.3%.

Elbert County, Georgia – Racial and ethnic composition Note: the US Census treats Hispanic/Latino as an ethnic category. This table excludes Latinos from the racial categories and assigns them to a separate category. Hispanics/Latinos may be of any race.
Race / Ethnicity (NH = Non-Hispanic)	Pop 1980	Pop 1990	Pop 2000	Pop 2010	Pop 2020	% 1980	% 1990	% 2000	% 2010	% 2020
White alone (NH)	12,855	13,058	13,505	12,956	12,610	68.53%	68.91%	65.84%	64.25%	64.22%
Black or African American alone (NH)	5,681	5,702	6,305	5,906	5,253	30.29%	30.09%	30.74%	29.29%	26.75%
Native American or Alaska Native alone (NH)	13	8	39	37	26	0.07%	0.04%	0.19%	0.18%	0.13%
Asian alone (NH)	21	45	50	121	182	0.11%	0.24%	0.24%	0.60%	0.93%
Native Hawaiian or Pacific Islander alone (NH)	x	x	6	5	3	x	x	0.03%	0.02%	0.02%
Other race alone (NH)	20	2	6	15	53	0.11%	0.01%	0.03%	0.07%	0.27%
Mixed race or Multiracial (NH)	x	x	111	159	514	x	x	0.54%	0.79%	2.62%
Hispanic or Latino (any race)	168	134	489	967	996	0.90%	0.71%	2.38%	4.80%	5.07%
Total	18,758	18,949	20,511	20,166	19,637	100.00%	100.00%	100.00%	100.00%	100.00%

== Judiciary and government ==
Elbert County is part of the Northern Judicial Circuit of Georgia, which also includes the counties of Hart, Franklin, Madison, and Oglethorpe. Elbert County's governing authority, the Elbert County Board of Commissioners, has five Commissioners elected in districts, a Chairperson elected County-wide, and an appointed County Administrator.

=== Politics ===
As of the 2020s, Elbert County is a Republican voting county, voting 71% for Donald Trump in 2024. For elections to the United States House of Representatives, Elbert County is part of Georgia's 10th congressional district, currently represented by Mike Collins. For elections to the Georgia State Senate, Elbert County is part of District 24. For elections to the Georgia House of Representatives, Elbert County is part of district District 123.

United States presidential election results for Elbert County, Georgia
Year	Republican		Democratic		Third party(ies)	
Year	No.	%	No.	%	No.	%
1912	13	1.15%	882	77.85%	238	21.01%
1916	0	0.00%	1,756	90.56%	183	9.44%
1920	187	13.04%	1,247	86.96%	0	0.00%
1924	72	5.59%	1,024	79.56%	191	14.84%
1928	931	46.95%	1,052	53.05%	0	0.00%
1932	77	3.63%	2,023	95.47%	19	0.90%
1936	438	19.62%	1,772	79.39%	22	0.99%
1940	357	14.70%	2,052	84.48%	20	0.82%
1944	370	19.11%	1,564	80.79%	2	0.10%
1948	152	7.16%	1,617	76.17%	354	16.67%
1952	552	14.41%	3,279	85.59%	0	0.00%
1956	447	10.95%	3,635	89.05%	0	0.00%
1960	609	14.23%	3,672	85.77%	0	0.00%
1964	1,887	37.30%	3,172	62.70%	0	0.00%
1968	914	16.98%	1,216	22.59%	3,252	60.42%
1972	2,875	76.48%	884	23.52%	0	0.00%
1976	961	16.89%	4,730	83.11%	0	0.00%
1980	1,967	32.45%	4,014	66.23%	80	1.32%
1984	3,366	55.77%	2,670	44.23%	0	0.00%
1988	2,796	56.77%	2,118	43.01%	11	0.22%
1992	2,372	38.46%	3,025	49.05%	770	12.49%
1996	2,393	40.86%	2,900	49.51%	564	9.63%
2000	3,262	55.73%	2,527	43.17%	64	1.09%
2004	4,626	60.33%	2,984	38.91%	58	0.76%
2008	4,868	58.43%	3,366	40.40%	98	1.18%
2012	4,859	59.58%	3,181	39.00%	116	1.42%
2016	5,292	65.93%	2,539	31.63%	196	2.44%
2020	6,226	67.85%	2,879	31.38%	71	0.77%
2024	6,860	71.54%	2,700	28.16%	29	0.30%

United States Senate election results for Elbert County, Georgia2
Year	Republican		Democratic		Third party(ies)	
Year	No.	%	No.	%	No.	%
2020	6,225	68.60%	2,717	29.94%	133	1.47%
2020	5,521	68.89%	2,493	31.11%	0	0.00%

United States Senate election results for Elbert County, Georgia3
Year	Republican		Democratic		Third party(ies)	
Year	No.	%	No.	%	No.	%
2020	4,223	48.98%	1,237	14.35%	3,162	36.67%
2020	5,531	69.03%	2,482	30.97%	0	0.00%
2022	5,135	70.32%	2,077	28.44%	90	1.23%
2022	4,713	70.80%	1,944	29.20%	0	0.00%

Georgia Gubernatorial election results for Elbert County
Year	Republican		Democratic		Third party(ies)	
Year	No.	%	No.	%	No.	%
2022	5,369	73.31%	1,916	26.16%	39	0.53%

== Education ==
The Elbert County School District has six schools, including the Elbert County High School.

== Historical and cultural sites ==
Historical and cultural sites in Elbert County include the Nancy Hart cabin, the Dan Tucker gravesite, the Stephen Heard Cemetery, the Petersburg Township site, Vans Creek Church, the Elbert County Courthouse, the Elberton Seaboard-Airline Depot, the Rock Gym, the Granite Bowl, the Elberton Granite Museum and Exhibit, the Richard B. Russell Dam, the Elbert Theatre, Richard B. Russell State Park, and Bobby Brown Park. The Georgia Guidestones stood in Elbert County from 1980 until their destruction in 2022.

== Notable people ==
- Warren Akin Sr., member of the Georgia House of Representatives and Confederate States Congress
- Milton Alexander, brigadier general during the Black Hawk War
- William J. Alston, U.S. House of Representatives, Alabama House of Representatives, and Alabama Senate
- Richard E. Banks, physician and surgeon
- William Barnett, U.S. House of Representatives
- William Augustus Bell, academic and president of Miles College
- Fred Bond Jr., tobacco industry representative and mayor Cary, North Carolina
- Nathaniel J. Hammond, United States House of Representatives and Georgia Attorney General
- Mecole Hardman, professional football player
- Derek Harper, professional basketball player
- Corra Mae Harris, journalist and war correspondent
- Sampson Willis Harris, U.S. House of Representatives and Georgia House of Representatives
- Nancy Hart, rebel heroine of the American Revolutionary War
- William Henry Heard, clergyman and diplomat
- R. H. Hunt, architect
- Mammy Kate, enslaved women
- Joseph Rucker Lamar, US Supreme Court justice
- Otis Leavill, R&B singer, songwriter and record company executive
- Daniel Parker, leader in the Primitive Baptist Church
- Charles Tait, United States Senator and a United States district judge
- Horace Tate, educator, activist, scholar, and politician
- Daniel Tucker, Methodist minister, farmer, and ferryman as well as a captain during the American Revolution
- Matthias Ward, lawyer and United States Senator from Texas.
- William J. White, civil rights leader, minister, educator, and journalist
- Thomas Simpson Woodward, brigadier general in the Georgia militia

== See also ==
- National Register of Historic Places listings in Elbert County, Georgia
- Georgia Guidestones
