= Elbert County School District =

School district in Georgia (U.S. state)

Address
- 50 Laurel Drive Elberton, Georgia, 30635-1842; United States
- Coordinates: 34.115034°N 82.873635°W

District information
- Grades: Pre-school - 12
- Superintendent: Jon Jarvis
- Accreditations: Southern Association of Colleges and Schools; Georgia Accrediting Commission

Students and staff
- Enrollment: 3,046
- Faculty: 244

Other information
- Telephone: (706) 213-4000
- Website: www.elbert.k12.ga.us

The Elbert County School District is a public school district in Elbert County, Georgia, United States. It serves the communities of Bowman and Elberton.

== Schools ==
The Elbert County School District has three elementary schools, one middle school, one high school, and one alternative school.

=== Elementary schools ===
- Blackwell Learning Centre (Head Start and Pre-Kindergarten)
- Elbert County Primary School (Grades K-2)
- Elbert County Elementary School (Grades 3-5)

=== Middle school ===
- Elbert County Middle School (Grades 6-8)

=== High school ===
- Elbert County High School

=== Alternative school ===
- Elberton Education Center (Grades 6-12)
