= John Martin (Georgia politician) =

American politician

Governor John Martin

Governor of Georgia
- In office January 3, 1782 – January 8, 1783
- Preceded by: Nathan Brownson
- Succeeded by: Lyman Hall

Personal details
- Born: John Martin; August 6, 1732 Providence, Rhode Island, U.S.
- Died: January 1786 (aged 53)

John Martin (August 6, 1732 – January 1786) was an American planter, soldier, and politician.

== Early life ==
Little is known of Martin's early life. He was born in Providence, Rhode Island and moved to St. Philip's Parish, Savannah, Georgia in 1767 with his brother James, where they bought adjoining plantations.

== Revolutionary War ==
Martin was active during the American Revolution, serving as a delegate to the provincial congress in July 1775, as well as a member of the local Committee of Safety. In the War of Independence he was appointed lieutenant of the 7th company of the Georgia Regiment in the Continental Army in January 1776, and rose to the rank of lieutenant colonel in 1777. He was made lieutenant colonel for Chatham County in 1781.

== Political career ==
His political service includes mayor of Savannah, Georgia (1778), sheriff of Chatham County, Georgia, member of the Georgia House of Representatives, State Treasurer, and revolutionary governor of Georgia from 1782 to 1783. Martin took the office of governor on January 2, 1782, from Sir James Wright, who said, "The rebel Governor Martin, now at Ebenezer, has issued three proclamations, one to the King’s troops, one to the Hessians, and another to the militia, inviting them all to revolt and join the virtuous Americans against the tyranny of the British government." Wright also referred to Martin as "Black Jack from the Northward."

When Martin began his term as governor, the British held Savannah as part of the southern theater of the American Revolution which, though near an end, was still being fought in Georgia. Martin wrote to General Anthony Wayne, "Nothing but the present deplorable situation of this country, & the starving condition of the greatest part of the inhabitants, many of whom have not tasted bread kind for more than a month past, could have induced me to trouble your Excellency on this occasion; but impressed with the idea that our distresses, which have been owing to the accumulated horrors of war this country has experienced for this four years past, might entitle us to hope for some small relief for the present from our sister State, has encouraged me to make this application."

During Martin's term as governor, Georgia adopted several important laws and proclamations. He offered protection to citizens from Creek and Seminole Indians, preferring to fight over peace. Martin declared that Georgians would not hesitate "a moment respecting which you would prefer--the sword, or olive branch." He offered full pardons to all Loyalists who surrendered to General Wayne, as well as offering land to Hessians who left the British. These actions increased desertions from the British forces. With Georgia in a state of financial ruin at the end of the war, he also passed a Confiscation and Banishment Act in 1782 which seized the property of 342 Loyalists identified by name.

Regarding the Revolutionary War in Georgia, Martin wrote on January 11, 1782: "It is true, this war has made us poor, and we are not ashamed to own it; because our cause is just; but we shall soon be rich and happy." Georgia then retook Savannah from the British on July 11, 1782, and the Revolutionary War in Georgia came to an end.

On January 9, 1783, Lyman Hall was elected governor, and Martin's term as governor of Georgia ended. After the war, Martin served as a commissioner in meetings with Creek and Cherokee Indians. He negotiated for the assistance of the governor of British Florida in stopping the bands of plunderers, and he worked to restore peace with the Creek Indians.

On January 31, 1783, Martin was elected treasurer of the state, a position he held until his retirement on March 17, 1784.

== Death and legacy ==
The Georgia Gazette of February 2, 1786, contained this record: "Last week died, on his way to the Westward, whither he was bound for the recovery of his health, the Hon. John Martin, Esq."

The town of Martin, in Stephens County, is named in his honor.

Political offices
Preceded by Nathan Brownson	Governor of Georgia; 1782 - 1783	Succeeded by Lyman Hall
