= Nathan Brownson =

American continental congressman and governor (1742–1796)

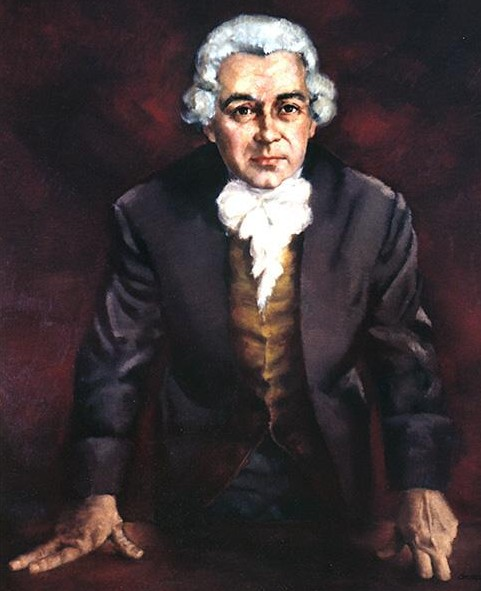

Governor of Georgia
- In office August 18, 1781 – January 3, 1782
- Preceded by: Myrick Davies
- Succeeded by: John Martin

Delegate from Georgia to the Continental Congress
- In office 1781–1781

Personal details
- Born: May 14, 1742 Woodbury, Connecticut
- Died: November 6, 1796 (aged 54) Riceboro, Georgia
- Party: None
- Children: 2

Nathan Brownson (May 14, 1742 – November 6, 1796) was an American physician and statesman. He served Georgia as a delegate to the Continental Congress in 1777 and as the Governor of Georgia in 1781. Nathan Brownson was a member of the Society of the Cincinnati of the State of Georgia.

== Early life ==
Brownson was born in Woodbury, Connecticut, the sixth of ten children born to Timothy (1701–1766) and Abgail Jenner (1707–1784). He graduated from Yale in 1761 and practiced medicine in his hometown. In 1769 he married Elizabeth Lewis. The couple moved to St. John Parish, Georgia, in 1774 and began working a 500-acre plantation near Savannah. He settled in Liberty County, Georgia, in 1764 and began his medical practice. Brownson’s wife died in 1775, and the following year he married Elizabeth McLean, with whom he had two children.

== Revolutionary War ==
In 1774, St. John Parish was a hotbed of revolutionary activity; many of its people were New England Congregationalists by way of Dorchester, South Carolina, a settlement on the Ashley River above Charlestown that had been founded by Puritans from Massachusetts. Brownson and another transplanted Connecticut physician, Lyman Hall, were among the eleven delegates chosen to represent the parish at the provincial congress, which met in Savannah in July 1775. Both men were elected to represent Georgia in the Second Continental Congress; Brownson served from January to May 1777 and again from late August to early October of the same year.

The British invasion of Georgia in the final days of 1778 was part of the southern theater of the revolution, but with the expulsion of the king’s troops from Augusta in June 1781, factional disputes threatened to spoil the victory. At this critical moment Brownson, then acting as deputy purveyor of hospitals in the South, was dispatched to Georgia with a brigadier’s commission from Congress. He initially served as Speaker of the House of Representatives, before a compromise was worked out whereby Brownson became governor and John Twiggs was promoted to brigadier general. Brownson congratulated General Nathanael Greene for his efforts to restore civil government in Georgia.

Brownson's term as governor during the last few months of 1781 was filled with dealing with hostile Creek Indians and bands of Tories that roamed the countryside. Commandant of Spanish Pensacola, Florida, Arturo O'Neill wrote to Gov. Brownson on November 18, 1781, indicating his suspicions regarding attempts of British traders in the area to gain favor with the Indians by securing presents for them. Brownson talked to the upper and lower Creek Nation and accused them of making an unsuccessful attack against American soldiers and of holding American traders, commissaries, and property. He told them that the Americans desire friendship, and threatened them with reprisal if they did not submit.

During the decade following the war, Brownson served the public almost continuously as justice of the peace, as a commissioner for erecting a new capital in Louisville, as a member of the convention that ratified the federal constitution, as a delegate to the convention that drafted the state constitution in 1788, and as the first president of the Georgia Senate. He was appointed by Congress as deputy purveyor of hospitals and later to the charge of the southern hospitals. He was one of the trustees for the establishment of Franklin College, later called the University of Georgia.

== Death and legacy ==
Brownson died at his plantation in 1796 in Riceboro, Georgia, and was buried in Midway Cemetery in Midway, Georgia. Although his career was not as distinguished as some others of Georgia’s founding fathers, Brownson’s service at crucial periods helped the state transcend factional bickering and focus on the improvement of society.

== See also ==
- List of speakers of the Georgia House of Representatives

Political offices
Preceded by Myrick Davies	Governor of Georgia; 1781–1782	Succeeded by John Martin
