= Heardmont, Georgia =

Unincorporated community in Georgia, U.S.

Coordinates: 34°06′38″N 82°41′43″W

Heardmont is an unincorporated community in Elbert County, in the U.S. state of Georgia.

== History ==
A post office called Heardmont was established in 1871, and remained in operation until 1953. The community was named for Stephen Heard, an early Governor of Georgia, who lived at Heardmont.
