= Petersburg, Georgia =

Upriver market town located in Wilkes County, Georgia

Coordinates: 33°57′48″N 82°34′13″W

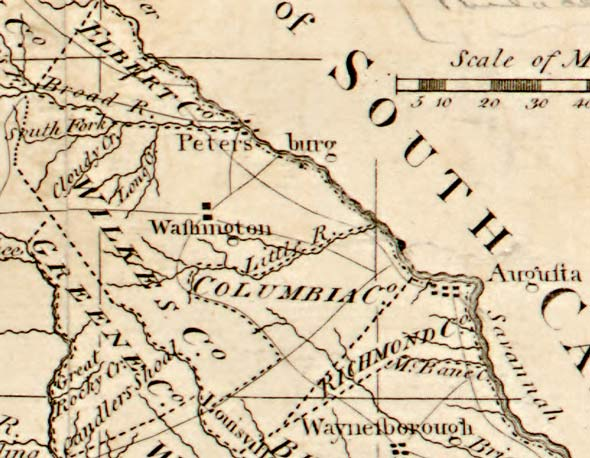
Upper Savannah River showing Augusta and Petersburg, Georgia in 1795

Petersburg, Georgia was an upriver market town located in Wilkes County, Georgia, United States (now Elbert County). Now defunct, it was named after Petersburg, Virginia, and founded by Dionysius Oliver in 1786 to serve the rapidly growing Broad River Valley region of Georgia.

== History ==
Petersburg enjoyed connection via pole boat with Augusta, Georgia, following the Savannah River. Petersburg gained importance as a tobacco inspection station, vital to local planters in obtaining good prices for their casked produce. During the peak of its prosperity, from 1800 to 1810, it was the third-largest city in Georgia, after Savannah and Augusta .

Sibbald described the town in his 1801 Pinelands of Georgia:

PETERSBURG, in point of situation and commercial consequence is second only to Augusta. It is situated on a point of Land, formed by Broad river, where it empties into Savannah river; is a handsome well built Town and presents to the view of the astonished traveller, a Town which has risen out of the Woods in a few years, as if by enchantment: It has two Warehouses for the Inspection of Tobacco: Is fifty miles North west from Augusta. On another point of land on the opposite side of Broad river is the town of Lincoln [Lisbon?], which has an Inspection for Tobacco, some Stores, &c. On the opposite shore in South-Carolina, is the town of Vienna, which has a number of houses, Stores, a tobacco-inspection, &c.'

Longstreet described the town ca. 1806 to 1809 in connection with an annual exhibition at Moses Waddel's nearby Willington Academy.

Petersburg was quite an active, busy, commercial little town. It was situated in the fork of the Savannah and Broad Rivers, and contained some eight or ten stores, with the usual supplement of grog shops, and the very unusual supplement of a billiard-table. Notwithstanding these last, the citizens of the place were generally remarkable for their refinement, respectability, intelligence and hospitality. The dwelling houses far outnumbered the stores and shops. It was separated from Lisbon by Broad River, and from Vienna by the Savannah. Lisbon we believe could never boast of more than two stores and a groggery, and as many dwellings. Vienna surpassed Lisbon in everything, but exactly how far, and in what we are not able to say, except in John Glover's house and store, which had no match in Lisbon.

Notable persons from the Broad River Valley area included William Wyatt Bibb, who practiced medicine in Petersburg, and was elected as a U. S. Representative from Georgia. He went on to serve in the U.S. Senate (1813–1816), moved to Alabama when appointed by the President as the Territorial Governor, and in 1819 was elected as the first Governor of that state. Charles Tait was brought with his family to the area in 1783 and served in the U.S. Senate (1809–1818), making Petersburg the home of concurrent Senators. George Rockingham Gilmer, born in Wilkes County and a pupil of Waddel's Academy, was elected U. S. Representative in the 1820s and Governor of Georgia 1829-1831 and 1837–1839.

'Petersburg Boat' extensively used along Upper Savannah River until the late 19th century

The town had a brief life; it was not developed until after the American Revolutionary War and after 1810 its population started declining, until it was abandoned. After the last person left, the buildings deteriorated, and the area finally reverted to agricultural land. The last known sale of a numbered lot occurred in 1837. Several reasons have been advanced for the decline. The tobacco monopoly was squeezed out by cotton, which was 'thrown upon boats all along the river without being inspected'. Other reasons given were the advent of steamboats (which were not practicable above Augusta). Later, the rivers proved to be obstacles to construction of railroads through the area, considered essential for the economic life of towns after 1850. But above all, the opportunity of new land to the west available for development attracted its inhabitants to keep moving west. The Petersburg post office was moved to nearby Lisbon, Georgia in 1844, and closed in 1855. The town of Vienna, South Carolina also declined and disappeared.

The town is best remembered today for its 'Petersburg boats', a pole boat of ten tons' carrying capacity well suited for the stretch of river between Petersburg and Augusta. It was in common use until well after the American Civil War.

== Geography ==
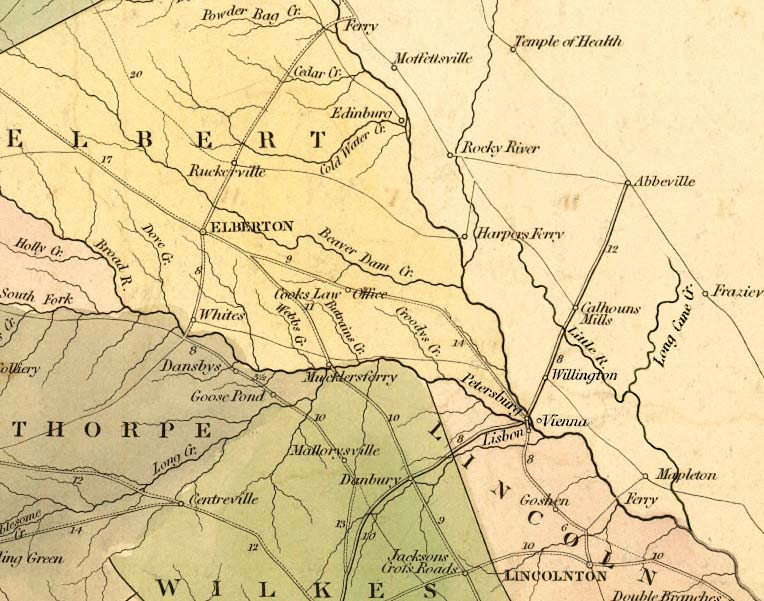
Broad River Valley of Georgia, 1839

Petersburg was located at 33°57'48"N, 82°34'13"W (WGS84/NAD83), at the confluence of the Broad and Savannah Rivers, 75 river miles above Augusta, and 305 river miles above Savannah. The 86 lots first laid out by Oliver occupied an area of about 40 acres. Population as reported by the U.S. Census of 1810 was 332, including slaves, and earlier may have numbered twice as many.

The site is now mostly submerged by Clarks Hill Lake, but visitors to Bobby Brown State Park can see foundations during low water (Augusta Chronicle, February 3, 2013). Maritime historians and archaeologists conducted a multidisciplinary investigation on the submerged ruins of the town in 1988.

== See also ==
- List of ghost towns in Georgia

== Bibliography ==
- Coulter, Ellis Merton (1965). Old Petersburg and The Broad River Valley of Georgia. University of Georgia Press, Boyd Publishing company (1994 reprint). ISBN 0-8203-0133-7.
- Elliott, Rita Folse (1988). The Pulse of Petersburg: A Multidisciplinary Investigation of a Submerged Tobacco Town. Thesis, East Carolina University.
- Elliott, Daniel T. (1995). Clark Hill River Basin Survey. Savannah River Archaeological Research Papers 7 and Occasional Papers of the Savannah River Archaeological Research Program and LAMAR Institute Publication Series Report Number 26 (PDF). The LAMAR Institute.
- Jones Jr., Charles Colcock (1878). The Dead Towns of Georgia. Morning News Steam Printing House, Savannah, GA. pp. 233–239. ISBN 0-87797-212-5.
- Krakow, Kenneth K. (1999). Georgia Place-Names. Winship Press, Macon, GA. ISBN 0-915430-00-2.
- Longstreet, Augustus Baldwin (1864). Master William Mitten. Burke, Boykin & Company, Macon, GA.
- Pavey, Rob (February 3, 2013). "Ruins of lost city resurface". Augusta Chronicle.
- Sherwood, Adiel (1837). Gazetteer of the State of Georgia. Reprint by Clearfield Company 2003. ISBN 0-8063-5154-3.
- Sibbald, George (1801). Notes and Observations on the Pinelands of Georgia. William J. Bunce, Augusta, GA. Digital library of Georgia gb0385.
- Henry Schenk Tanner, A New Map of South Carolina with its Canals, Roads & Distances from Place to Place along the Stage & Steam Boat Routes, 1833, Library of Congress
