= Beverly, Georgia =

Unincorporated community in Georgia, U.S.

Coordinates: 34°05′44″N 82°43′43″W

Beverly is an unincorporated community in Elbert County, in the U.S. state of Georgia.

== History ==
A post office called Beverly was established in 1897, and remained in operation until 1908. The community was named after Beverly Allen, the proprietor of a local tavern. An act of the Georgia General Assembly to incorporate Beverly in 1907 was repealed in 1919.
