= Cokesbury College =

Defunct college in Maryland, US

Cokesbury College was a college in Abingdon, Maryland, and later Baltimore, Maryland, that existed from 1787 until 1796.

Cokesbury College was founded as the first Methodist college in the United States. Its name was a combination of the names of Thomas Coke and Francis Asbury, who were ordained the first two Methodist bishops in America at the meeting held on Christmas Day, 1784 at which it was also decided to found the college.

In December 1787 a Mr. Heath was inaugurated as the first president of the college. The college opened at that time with three instructors (including Heath) and 25 students. By September 1788 Jacob Hall was appointed the third president of the college. Due to the heavy turnover in both teachers and presidents, Francis Asbury's constant work on finding new people to fill these positions was key to the college continuing to operate. Among the professors at the college was Charles Tait, who later was a U.S. senator from Georgia and a federal judge.

In December 1788, there was an attempt to burn down the college. However the fire was put out by some of the students before it caused significant damage. In 1794, the college was granted a charter by the state of Maryland. It burned down on 4 December 1795. A large vacant building was then obtained in Baltimore which became the new home of the college. On 4 December 1796, the new college building burned down, and Cokesbury College ceased to exist.

The church that served as the chapel to the college did however survive. Cokesbury United Methodist Church (as it is now known) was first called the Abingdon Methodist Chapel. It was built on land purchased in 1782 from John Paca, the brother of the governor of Maryland. By 1784, it was open for worship.

== Chapel fire ==
The original church of 1784, a partially brick, mostly wooden structure, burned in 1896. Immediately, upon its original foundation, the present little brick church was erected. Services were held in the autumn of 1896; concern for the community at no time was interrupted; and the church today serves the needs of the extended Abingdon community. In July 2009 Cokesbury Memorial United Methodist Church welcomed its first full-time Pastor, Frankie Allen Revell.
