= Rucker House (Ruckersville, Georgia) =

Historic house in Georgia, United States

- U.S. National Register of Historic Places
- Location within Georgia Location within the United States
- Location: GA 985, Ruckersville, Georgia
- Coordinates: 34°9′49″N 82°47′22″W
- Area: 11 acres (4.5 ha)
- Built: 1815
- Architectural style: Greek Revival, Plantation plain
- NRHP reference No.: 78000979
- Added to NRHP: June 23, 1978

The Rucker House is a historic residence in Ruckersville, Georgia. It was added to the National Register of Historic Places on June 23, 1978. It is located on GA 985. Joseph Rucker (January 12, 1788 - April 27th 1864) was a large landholder and slaver. He died shortly after the American Civil War. His family established Ruckersville, Virginia and Ruckersville, Georgia.

== See also ==
- National Register of Historic Places listings in Elbert County, Georgia
