= Dewy Rose, Georgia =

- Unincorporated community Census-designated place
- Location within Georgia
- Coordinates: 34°10′11″N 82°57′11″W
- Country: United States
- State: Georgia
- County: Elbert

Area
  - Total: 1.68 sq mi (4.34 km^{2})
  - Land: 1.67 sq mi (4.32 km^{2})
  - Water: 0.0077 sq mi (0.02 km^{2})
- Elevation: 732 ft (223 m)

Population (2020)
  - Total: 161
  - Density: 96.5/sq mi (37.24/km^{2})
- Time zone: UTC-5 (Eastern (EST))
  - Summer (DST): UTC-4 (EDT)
- ZIP code: 30634
- Area codes: 706 & 762
- GNIS feature ID: 355485

Dewy Rose is an unincorporated community and census-designated place (CDP) in Elbert County, Georgia, United States. Its population was 161 as of the 2020 census. Dewy Rose has a post office with ZIP code 30634. Georgia State Route 17 passes through the community.

== History ==
A post office called Dewy Rose has been in operation since 1882. According to tradition, the community was named for the dewy rose the postmaster's daughter found.

== Demographics ==
Historical population
Census	Pop.	Note	%±
2010	154		—
2020	161		4.5%
U.S. Decennial Census; 2010 2020

Dewy Rose was first listed as a census designated place in the 2010 U.S. census.

Dewy Rose, Georgia – Racial and ethnic composition Note: the US Census treats Hispanic/Latino as an ethnic category. This table excludes Latinos from the racial categories and assigns them to a separate category. Hispanics/Latinos may be of any race.
Race / Ethnicity (NH = Non-Hispanic)	Pop 2010	Pop 2020	% 2010	% 2020
White alone (NH)	105	110	68.18%	68.32%
Black or African American alone (NH)	42	22	27.27%	13.66%
Native American or Alaska Native alone (NH)	0	1	0.00%	0.62%
Asian alone (NH)	5	6	3.25%	3.73%
Pacific Islander alone (NH)	0	0	0.00%	0.00%
Some Other Race alone (NH)	0	0	0.00%	0.00%
Mixed Race or Multi-Racial (NH)	0	8	0.00%	4.97%
Hispanic or Latino (any race)	2	14	1.30%	8.70%
Total	154	161	100.00%	100.00%
