= Rock Branch, Georgia =

Unincorporated community in Georgia, U.S.

Coordinates: 34°14′23″N 82°47′59″W

Rock Branch is an unincorporated community in Elbert County, in the U.S. state of Georgia.

== History ==
The community takes its name from nearby Rock Branch creek.
