= Granite Bowl =

Coordinates: 34.11064°N 82.87022°W

The Granite Bowl is the off-campus playing venue for the football and soccer sports teams for the Elbert County Blue Devils in Elberton, Georgia, in the United States. It is located between College Avenue and West Church Street and is near the city of Elberton's downtown square. The stadium can hold up to 20,000 people and is made almost entirely out of granite. The Granite Bowl has been listed as an important historic site by the Georgia Trust for Historic Preservation and is considered by many to be the jewel of Elbert County.

== History ==
Originally, the site of the Granite Bowl was used as a town dump. It was built in 1952 by Athletic Boosters and many of the businesses involved in Elberton's Granite Industry. The stadium was named the Granite Bowl for being made out of over 100,000 tons of blue granite. The only expense in the new stadium came with materials for the press box and concrete. Everything else was volunteered or provided free-of-charge by local businesses. In 1995, the Blue Devils won their one and only football state championship in the Class AA against Washington-Wilkes of Wilkes County, GA. The Blue Devils won the game 27-0 at Washington-Wilkes. In 2003, the stadium celebrated its 50th season since opening in 1952.

== The Scoreboard ==
The Granite bowl's score board is the same scoreboard that the University of Georgia used in Sanford Stadium. It was the scoreboard that was used before the stadium was enclosed and renovated. This scoreboard is also the same one that was used during Georgia's 1980 national championship season.

== The Spirit Rock ==
One of the many traditions involved with the Granite Bowl Stadium is touching the spirit rock atop the closed end of the stadium before each game. Hudson Cone, a spokesman for the Granite Association, states that the rock is not from a local source but from Spirit Lake in South Dakota., where legend has it that it was taken from an Indian battlefield.
