= Georgia State Treasurer =

The Georgia state treasurer is a financial office of the state of Georgia. Established as an appointed state constitutional office in 1781, the office was directly elected from the enactment of the 1877 constitution until 1972, when a constitutional amendment removed the office from the list of constitutional officers. The office was restored as an appointed office under Zell Miller in 1993.

== List of treasurers ==
=== Appointed treasurers (prior to 1877) ===
#	Image	Name	Term	Party
		William O'Bryen	1778	
		James Bryan	1781	
		John Lindsay	1782	
		Joseph Clay	1782	
		John Martin	1783-1784	
		Seth John Cuthbert	1785-86	
		George Jones	1787	
		John Meals	1788-91	
		John Gibbons	1792-95	
		John Berrien	1796-1800	
		Edwin Mounger	1801-05	
		George R. Clayton	1806-1825	
		James Bozeman	1826-28	
		Hines Holt	1829-1832	
		John Williams	1833	
		Thomas Haynes	1834-1841	
		Benjamin B. Smith	1842	
		Walter H. Mitchell	1843-1846	
		William B. Tinsley	1847-1850	
		J. M. Patton	1851	
		Walter H. Mitchell	1851-1852	
		John B. Trippe	1853-1860	
		John Jones	1861-1867	
		Nedom L. Angier	1868-1872	
		John Jones	1872-1876	

=== Elected treasurers (1877-1972) ===
#	Image	Name	Term	Party
		J. W. Renfroe	1876-1880	
		D. N. Speer	1880-1884	
		Robert Ulla Hardeman	1884-1896	
		W. J. Speer	1896-1900	
		R. E. Park	1900-1909	
		J. Pope Brown	1909-1911	
		W. J. Speer	1911-1931	
		M. L. Ledford	1931-1933	
		George B. Hamilton	1933-1961	
		Jack B. Ray	1961-1971	
		Bill Burson	1971-1972	

=== Appointed treasurers (1993-present) ===
#	Image	Name	Term	Party
		Steve McCoy	1993-1997	
		Dan Ebersole	1997-2010	
		Steve McCoy	2011 - 2019	
		Lynne Riley	2019-2020	
		Steve McCoy	2020-present	
