= Rock Gym (Elberton, Georgia) =

- U.S. National Register of Historic Places
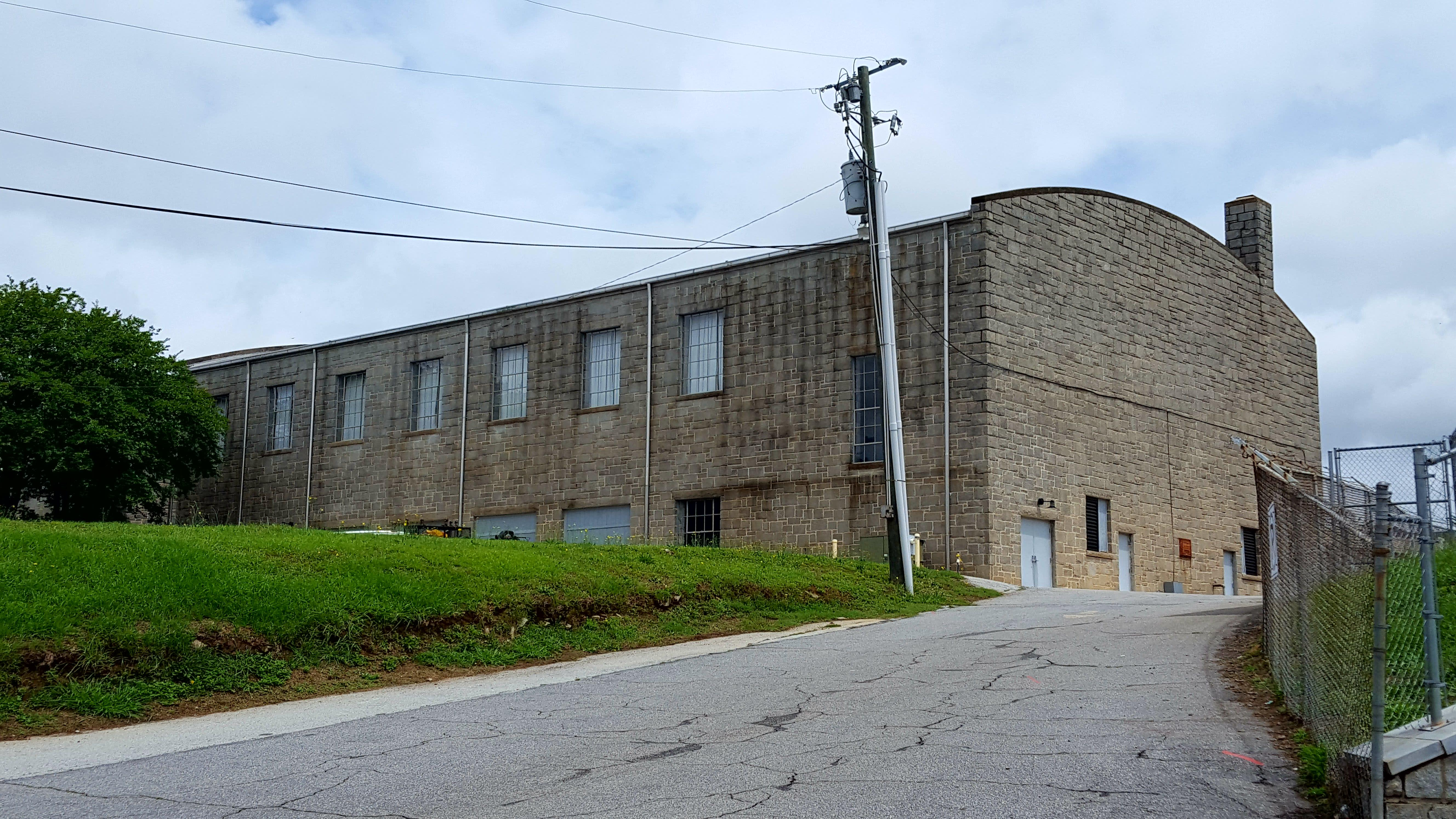
- Rock Gym - May 2018

- Location within Georgia Location within the United States
- Location: 45 Forest Ave., Elberton, Georgia
- Coordinates: 34°6′39″N 82°52′19″W
- Built: 1940
- Architect: Price, Hunter J.; et al.
- Architectural style: Moderne, Stripped Classical
- NRHP reference No.: 98001559
- Added to NRHP: December 31, 1998

The Rock Gym is a historic gym located at 45 Forest Avenue in Elberton, Georgia, United States. The gym was built in 1941 and initially served as a National Guard armory. The Elbert County School System also occupied the building and used it for high school basketball games, commencement ceremonies, school dances, and other events. The school system closed the gym in the 1990s, and it was vacant until 2003, when the city considered demolishing the building. The Elbert County Historical Society spent the next nine years restoring the building, and it reopened in 2012 as the Elberton-Elbert County Conference Center and Museum.

The gym was listed on the National Register of Historic Places in 1998.
