= Humphrey Wells =

American politician

Governor of Georgia
- In office February 5, 1780 – February 16, 1780
- Preceded by: George Wells
- Succeeded by: Stephen Heard

Personal details
- Born: Humphrey Wells

Humphrey Wells was an American politician who served as the governor of Georgia for only two days, from February 16, 1780, to February 18, 1780. He resigned the office to Stephen Heard. Before that, he served as a member of the Executive Council of Georgia, to which he was named in July 1779.
