= Ralph Gaines House =

- U.S. National Register of Historic Places
- Location within Georgia
- Nearest city: Elberton, Georgia
- Coordinates: 34°12′09″N 82°48′32″W
- Area: 24 acres (9.7 ha)
- Built: 1825
- Architectural style: Log construction
- NRHP reference No.: 77000422
- Added to NRHP: October 5, 1977

The Ralph Gaines House, near Elberton, Georgia, was built in 1825. It was listed on the National Register of Historic Places in 1977. The listing included three contributing buildings on 24 acres (9.7 ha).

It is a log cabin and frame cottage built by Ralph Gaines around 1820 and expanded around 1840. The northwest room and hall of the cottage is the original log cabin. It has a veranda across three-fourths of its front facade.

According to the 1976 National Register nomination, it was important architecturally for the original log cabin portion of the house, mostly hidden, and for the nearby log shed barns. Most of the log cabin is enclosed within later framing or covered by weatherboarding; the only visible portion of it is its chimney with a "diaper pattern of glazed headers." In 1977, it was home of direct descendants of Ralph Gaines.

It is located north of Elberton on Georgia State Route 368.
