= Myrick Davies =

American politician

Governor of Georgia
- In office August 1780 – August 16, 1781
- Preceded by: Stephen Heard
- Succeeded by: Nathan Brownson

Personal details
- Born: Myrick Davies
- Died: 1781

Myrick Davies ( ? – 1781) was an American politician. He served as the governor of Georgia from 1780 to 1781 after Stephen Heard moved to North Carolina. Following his death in 1781, Nathan Brownson became governor. Davies was killed by Loyalists.

Political offices
Preceded by Stephen Heard	Governor of Georgia; 1780–1781	Succeeded by Nathan Brownson
