= Hard Cash, Georgia =

Hard Cash
- Unincorporated community
- Location within the state of Georgia
- Coordinates: 34°11′05″N 82°58′16″W
- Country: United States
- State: Georgia
- County: Elbert
- Elevation: 718 ft (219 m)
- Time zone: UTC-4 (EST)
  - Summer (DST): UTC-4 (EDT)
- GNIS feature ID: 356166

Hard Cash is an unincorporated community in Elbert County, Georgia, United States.

In 1894, the settlement was noted as a stop on the Southern Railway.
