= Stephen Heard =

American politician

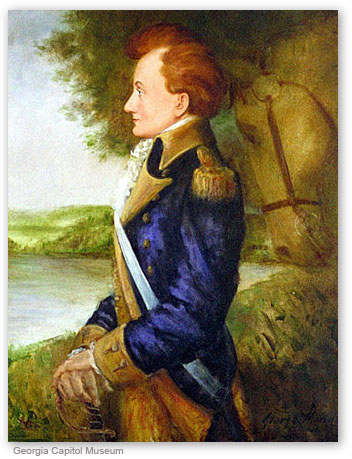
- Portrait of Heard

Governor of Georgia
- In office May 24, 1780 – August 18, 1781
- Preceded by: Humphrey Wells
- Succeeded by: Myrick Davies

Member of the Georgia House of Representatives
- In office 1779–1795

Personal details
- Born: Stephen Heard; November 1, 1740 Hanover County, Virginia
- Died: November 15, 1815 (aged 75) Heardmont, Elbert County, Georgia
- Spouse(s): Jane Germany (–1778); Elizabeth Darden Heard (August 25, 1785 – November 11, 1815)

Military service
- Allegiance: Province of Georgia (1754–1763); United Colonies (1775–1776); United States (1776–1779)
- Branch/service: Georgia Militia; Continental Army
- Rank: Captain (Georgia Militia); Lieutenant Colonel (Continental Army)

Stephen Heard (November 1, 1740 – November 15, 1815) was an American planter, politician and military officer who briefly served as president of Georgia and was sometimes called "governor". Born in Virginia, Heard fought in the French and Indian War in the Virginia militia under George Washington, then with his father and brother moved to the Georgia colony based on a land grant for such service, and built two forts in Wilkes County called "Fort Heard". During the American Revolutionary War Heard served as a lieutenant colonel in the Georgia Militia under Colonel John Dooly.

He fought with Gen. Elijah Clarke at the Battle of Kettle Creek where he was captured but escaped. Voters elected Heard to the Georgia House of Representatives, where he served from 1779 to 1795 (the war officially ending in 1783). Heard's Fort was designated the seat of government for Georgia on February 3, 1780 and remained such until 1781, then developed into the town of Washington, Georgia (still the county seat). Fellow legislators elected Heard as the state's executive, where he served from May 24, 1780, until August 18, 1781. One source records Heard as resigning as president in 1782.

== Early life ==
Stephen Heard was born in Hanover County, Virginia on November 1, 1740, to John Heard Jr. and his wife Bridgett Carol Heard, wealthy tobacco planters. Heard's paternal grandfather, John Sr., was his immigrant ancestor on that side, arriving about 1720 in Virginia from Ireland. Heard's parents were each born and raised in Virginia, where their families were planters. All four of Heard's grandparents were part of the Anglo-Irish Protestant Ascendancy of Ireland. Stephen was brought up in Virginia and received his primary education there. This was the limit of his formal education.

== French and Indian War ==
With the outbreak of the French and Indian War in 1754, Heard left school in search of honor and adventure in the army. Along with some of his brothers, Heard enlisted in the Virginia colonial regiment under the command of George Washington, then a colonel. Heard drew from this experience of warfare in the frontier in his later military service. During the war, Heard was promoted by Washington to the rank of captain. Heard served with Washington at the Battle of Jumonville Glen, Battle of Fort Necessity, Braddock Expedition, and the Battle of the Monongahela. Heard also served under Washington on the Virginia frontier (in what is today the state of West Virginia from August 1755 until early 1757 as part of the Virginia regiment's war against Native American forces in that region.

Heard also served directly under Washington during the Forbes expedition. This military collaboration led to a lifetime friendship between the two men. Heard named one of his sons George Washington Heard in his commander's honor. Heard was one of few Virginians to take part in the Battle of the Plains of Abraham and the only (known) Virginian to take part in the Battle of Signal Hill.

== Between wars ==
Following the war, the Heard family received a land grant of 150 acres for their service in what is today Wilkes County, Georgia. Stephen, his brother Barnard, and their father John, moved there with their families. This land was near the mouth of the Little River in an area that Britain had not yet acquired from the Muscogee and Cherokee Indians. Because of this, the family constructed Heard's Fort as a defensive post for travelers from Native American attacks and the wilderness. The Heards also built a second fort about eight miles north of the first fort, which was also named after the family.

Heard's Fort was completely finished in 1774. Others settled near it and in 1780 it was designated as the city of Washington, Georgia. For a time during the Revolutionary War, Heard's Fort served as the temporary capitol of Georgia.

== Revolutionary War ==
When the Revolutionary War broke out, Heard immediately joined the patriot cause. He was joined by fellow Georgians Elijah Clarke, Nancy Hart, and John Dooly, who also lived in Wilkes County. Georgia residents were very divided on the issue of independence. Throughout the war, the patriots faced a strong Loyalist resistance. In the winter of 1778 while Heard was away fighting, a group of Tories stormed his house and burned it down. They forced his wife Jane, and their adopted daughter out into a snow storm; the women died from cold exposure.

Despite the death of his family, Heard continued to fight in the revolution. He participated in the Battle of Kettle Creek, where he was involved in the most violent and dangerous part of the fight. According to one source, Heard set himself apart by "encouraging his men and leading them to points of danger and vantage." Heard was captured by Loyalists at the Battle of Kettle Creek in what was his last battle of the war. Although scheduled to be executed, he was freed through a ruse by Mammy Kate, whom he subsequently freed.

After the war, Heard became a politician as well as planter. The new state of Georgia House of Representatives elected him as president; the position was later known as governor. He served from May 24, 1780, until August 18, 1781. One source records Heard as resigning as president in 1782.

Heard had been elected to the Georgia House of Representatives, serving from 1779 to 1795. As their terms were short, he was allowed to keep his position while serving the short period as governor.

As partial payment for his patriotic service, Heard received a land grant of more than 6,000 acres inland near the Upper Savannah River and the Georgia/South Carolina border and about 30 miles from what had been Fort Heard, but had become Washington, Georgia. He established a plantation he called "Heardmont". In 1790, Wilkes County was split and Heardmont was in Elbert County, Georgia, across the river from Abbeville, South Carolina. At the Georgia Constitutional Convention in 1795, Heard was one of Elbert County's delegates. Heard and two other men decided on the location of Elberton, the county seat in 1803. Although Heardmont disappeared long ago, the Stephen A. Heard Chapter of the Daughters of the American Revolution obtained ten acres, which includes the former house site as well as the cemetery.

== Family life ==
Heard's first wife and daughter died during the American Revolutionary War. He remarried, to Virginia-born Elizabeth Darden, who bore five daughters and four sons. One of his sons, Thomas Jefferson Heard, was probably the biological father of George Heard, who was in turn the father of Bishop William Henry Heard

Heard became a leading advocate for educating women, on the board of trustees for Salem College in North Carolina, dedicated to educating women.

== Death and legacy ==
Heard died at his home, Heardmont, in Elbert County, Georgia, in 1815, at the age of 75. A historical marker commemorates his former home near Middleton, near Elberton. Heard's death was not otherwise publicly recorded, with no known obituaries or death notices. Heard County, Georgia was named for him.

== See also ==
- Mammy Kate

== Sources ==
- National Governors Association
- New Georgia Encyclopedia

Political offices
Preceded by Humphrey Wells	Governor of Georgia; 1780–1781	Succeeded by Myrick Davies
