= Ruckerville, Kentucky =

Unincorporated community in Kentucky, United States

Coordinates: 37°56′01″N 84°05′40″W

Ruckerville is an unincorporated community in Clark County, in the U.S. state of Kentucky.

== History ==
A post office called Ruckerville was established in 1850, and remained in operation until 1909. The community derives its name from Reuben Rucker, an original owner of the town site.
