= Huguenot, Georgia =

Coordinates: 33°59′22.43″N 82°38′18.49″W

Huguenot (/hjudʒnɑːt/) is an extinct town in Elbert County, in the U.S. state of Georgia.

== History ==
A post office called Huguenot was established in 1894, and remained in operation until 1908. The community most likely was named for the fact a share of the first settlers were descended from the Huguenots.
