= Ruckersville, Georgia =

Unincorporated community in Georgia, US

Coordinates: 34°09′53″N 82°47′17″W

Ruckersville is an unincorporated community in Elbert County, Georgia.

== History ==
Ruckersville was founded in northeastern Georgia in 1773, and named after Ruckersville, Virginia. The pioneering Rucker family maintained the Rucker House at the site, which still stands today. The White family, also from the Ruckersville region in then Orange County, Virginia, migrated five miles south of the new town, east of Elberton on the Calhoun Falls Highway, to Farm Hill, a plantation and the birthplace of Corra Mae White Harris, the journalist and author.

John Rucker (1759-1827) and John White (1696-1787) took up the first grants in 1773. White likely never lived here though his son and heir Thomas White came here with his wife and children on November 11, 1792, four years after his father's estate was settled. There are descendants of Rucker and Whites in the county today. White descendants migrated to north of Round Oak in Jones County, Georgia, to Jasper County, to Como in Panola County, Mississippi, to Whitehaven, Shelby County, Tennessee, to Hernando in DeSoto County, Mississippi.

John Rucker made a trip back to his old home in the year 1777 and returned to Georgia with Elizabeth Tinsley as his bride. It was his son Joseph Whitner Rucker (1788-1864) who became Elbert County's largest slaveowner, first millionaire and one of Georgia’s most prominent citizens.

The Elberton Star, on September 19, 1929, wrote: "In the northern section of Elbert county, on Van’s Creek, and near an old Indian trail, is the town of Ruckersville, once a flourishing city of 600 or 700 people. Around it cluster the memories of much of Georgia’s history. Once it had fifty stores, two banks and a newspaper, and was the home of Georgia’s first millionaire. It was the depot for distribution of freight for all points above Petersburg, the freight being brought up the Savannah river by pole-boats. It had two schools, and an academy of which a Princeton graduate was principal..."

A post office called Ruckersville was established in 1823, and remained in operation until 1901. The Georgia General Assembly incorporated Ruckersville as a town in 1822. The town's municipal charter was repealed in 1995.

== Notable people ==
- Joseph Rucker Lamar (1857–1916), an associate justice of the Supreme Court of the United States, was born in Ruckersville.
