= Charles Tait (politician) =

American judge

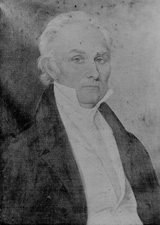

Judge of the United States District Court for the Northern District of Alabama Judge of the United States District Court for the Southern District of Alabama
- In office March 10, 1824 – February 1, 1826
- Appointed by: operation of law
- Preceded by: Seat established by 4 Stat. 9
- Succeeded by: William Crawford

Judge of the United States District Court for the District of Alabama
- In office May 13, 1820 – March 10, 1824
- Appointed by: James Monroe
- Preceded by: Seat established by 3 Stat. 564
- Succeeded by: Seat abolished

United States Senator from Georgia
- In office November 27, 1809 – March 3, 1819
- Preceded by: John Milledge
- Succeeded by: John Elliott

Personal details
- Born: Charles Tait; February 1, 1768 Hanover, Colony of Virginia, British America
- Died: October 7, 1835 (aged 67) Claiborne, Alabama
- Resting place: Dry Forks Cemetery; Wilcox County, Alabama
- Party: Democratic-Republican
- Education: read law

Charles Tait (February 1, 1768 – October 7, 1835) was a United States senator from Georgia and a United States district judge of the United States District Court for the District of Alabama, the United States District Court for the Northern District of Alabama and the United States District Court for the Southern District of Alabama.

== Education and career ==
Born on February 1, 1768, near Hanover, Hanover County, Colony of Virginia, British America, Tait moved to Georgia in 1783 with his parents, who settled near Petersburg. He completed preparatory studies, then attended Wilkes Academy in Washington, Georgia from 1786 to 1787, and Cokesbury College in Abingdon, Maryland in 1788. He was a Professor of French at Cokebury College from 1789 to 1794. He read law in 1795 and was admitted to the Georgia bar. He was rector and professor at Richmond Academy in Augusta, Georgia from 1795 to 1798. He entered private practice in Elbert County and in Lexington, Georgia from 1798 to 1803. He owned slaves. He was a Judge of the Superior Court of Georgia for the Western Judicial Circuit from 1803 to 1809.

== Congressional service ==
Tait was elected as a Democratic-Republican to the United States Senate from Georgia to fill the vacancy caused by the resignation of United States Senator John Milledge, winning election by one vote. He was reelected in 1813 and served from November 27, 1809, to March 3, 1819. He was Chairman of the United States Senate Committee on Naval Affairs for the 14th and 15th United States Congresses. Following his departure from Congress, he moved to Wilcox County, Alabama in 1819.

== Federal judicial service ==
Tait was nominated by President James Monroe on May 10, 1820, to the United States District Court for the District of Alabama, to a new seat authorized by 3 Stat. 564. He was confirmed by the United States Senate on May 13, 1820, and received his commission the same day. Tait was reassigned by operation of law to the United States District Court for the Northern District of Alabama and the United States District Court for the Southern District of Alabama on March 10, 1824, to a new joint seat authorized by 4 Stat. 9. His service terminated on February 1, 1826, due to his resignation.

== Later career and death ==
In 1827, Tait was elected to the American Philosophical Society. Following his resignation from the federal bench, Tait was engaged as a planter near Claiborne, Alabama. He declined a mission to Great Britain in 1828. He died on October 7, 1835, near Claiborne. He was interred in Dry Forks Cemetery on his country estate in Wilcox County.

== Sources ==
- United States Congress. "Charles Tait (id: T000015)". Biographical Directory of the United States Congress.
- Charles Tait at the Biographical Directory of Federal Judges, a publication of the Federal Judicial Center.

U.S. Senate
Preceded by John Milledge	U.S. senator (Class 3) from Georgia; 1809–1819	Succeeded by John Elliott
Legal offices
Preceded by Seat established by 3 Stat. 564	Judge of the United States District Court for the District of Alabama; 1820–1824	Succeeded by Seat abolished
Preceded by Seat established by 4 Stat. 9	Judge of the United States District Court for the Northern District of Alabama; Judge of the United States District Court for the Southern District of Alabama; 1824–1826	Succeeded by William Crawford
