= Building at 6 and 7 Public Square =

- U.S. National Register of Historic Places
- Location within Georgia
- Location: 6 & 7 Public Sq., Bowman, Georgia
- Coordinates: 34°12′18″N 83°01′54″W
- Area: less than one acre
- Built: 1908
- Architectural style: Italianate
- NRHP reference No.: 09000750
- Added to NRHP: September 24, 2009

The Building at 6 and 7 Public Square, in Bowman, Georgia, was built in 1908. It was listed on the National Register of Historic Places in 2009.

It is a one-story commercial building, Italianate in style, with two commercial spaces.

Contributing to its significance is that "Its facade retains not only its decorative brickwork but also its cast-iron columns, recessed entrance, plate-glass windows, and its interior retains its coved pressed-metal ceilings—architectural features often lost or obscured on many other commercial buildings of this period."
