= Huguenot, Virginia =

Unincorporated community in Virginia, US

Coordinates: 37°34′06″N 77°42′42″W

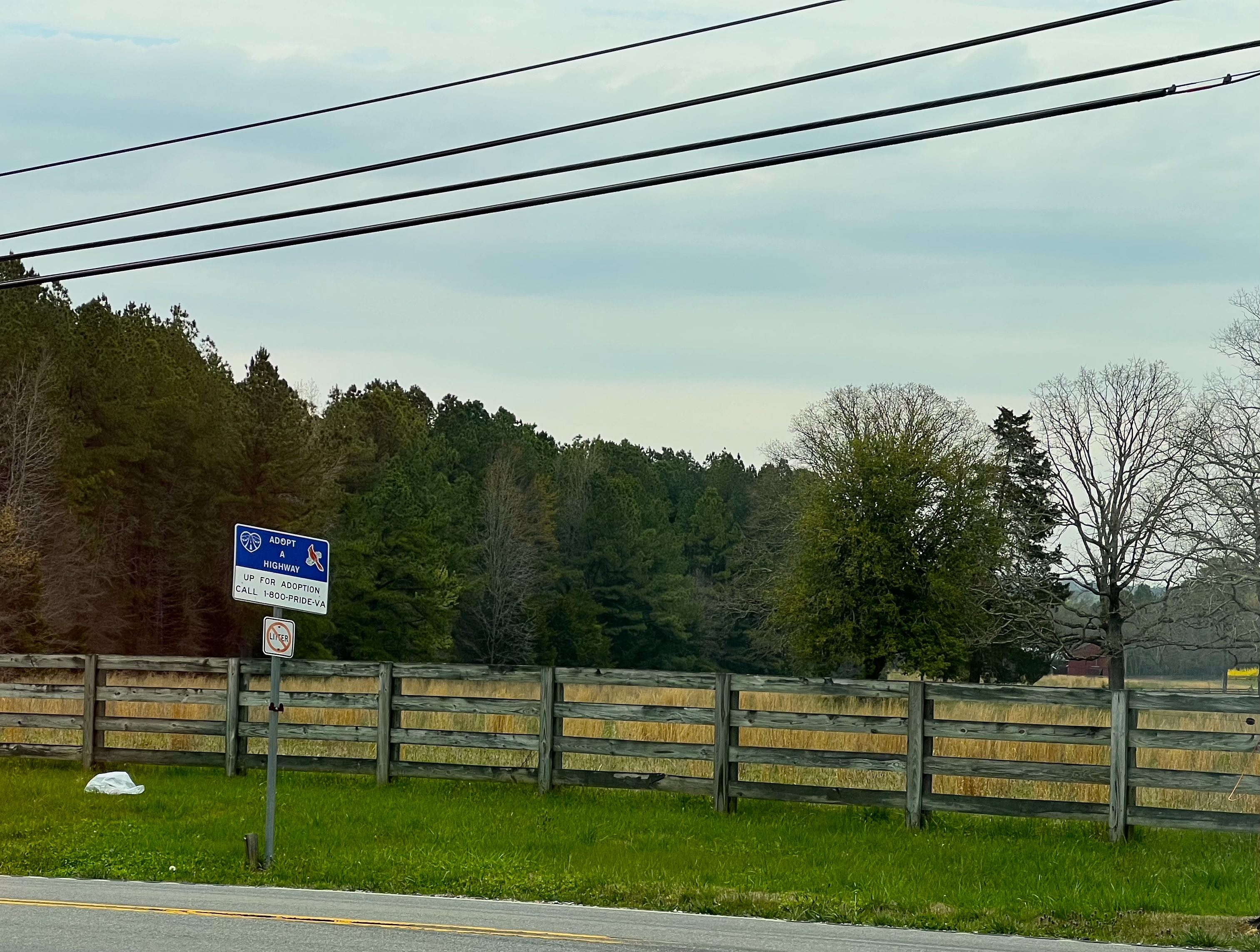

Huguenot is an unincorporated community in Powhatan County, in the U.S. state of Virginia.
