= Ruckersville, Virginia =

- Census-designated place
- Karte Location of the Ruckersville CDP within Greene County

- Location within Virginia Location within the United States
- Coordinates: 38°13′59″N 78°22′09″W
- Country: United States
- State: Virginia
- County: Greene
- Founded: 1732

Area
  - Total: 2.78 sq mi (7.19 km^{2})
  - Land: 2.75 sq mi (7.13 km^{2})
  - Water: 0.023 sq mi (0.06 km^{2})
- Elevation: 594 ft (181 m)

Population (2010)
  - Total: 1,141
  - Estimate (2020): 1,321
  - Density: 415/sq mi (160.1/km^{2})
- Time zone: UTC-5 (EST)
  - Summer (DST): UTC-4 (EDT)
- ZIP code: 22968
- Area code: 434
- FIPS code: 51-69360
- GNIS feature ID: 1498463

Ruckersville is a census-designated place (CDP) in Greene County, Virginia, United States, located in a rural area north of Charlottesville.

The population as of the 2020 estimate was 1,321, a 17.7% increase from the 2010 census with 1,141. The community lies amidst hills, mountain views, trees, and farmland. It is located at the intersection of two major highways, north–south U.S. Route 29 and east–west U.S. Route 33. It was founded in 1732, by the same family that established Ruckersville, Georgia.

== History ==
Ruckersville was originally founded by John Rucker in what was then Orange County. He settled east of here on Rippin's Run and named the village for his uncle, Captain John Rucker, who helped choose the site for St. Mark's Parish Church in 1732.

Several early families settled here, including that of John White (1696–1787), the emigrant of Leicestershire who, in 1739, received a land grant from George II of Great Britain for bringing four convicts to the Colonies to work as indentured servants as he reportedly had done himself. The 235 acres was near the storied Swift Run Gap. Six years on, in 1745, White leased and later purchased land just north of Ruckersville, on the north side of the south branch of the Rapidan River.

White Run, a creek named for the family, begins at Ruckersville and joins Rippin's Run, east of Burtonsville. A ford on the Rapidan River, north of Scuffletown in today's Orange County, is believed to have been named for this family. It was the site of regimental crossings and scuffles during the American Civil War.

Ruckersville became part of Greene County when it was organized in the western portion of Orange County in 1838.

== Geography ==
Ruckersville is located in southeastern Greene County.

According to the U.S. Census Bureau, the Ruckersville CDP has a total area of 2.8 square miles (7.2 km^{2}), of which 0.02 square miles (0.06 km^{2}), or 0.79%, are water.

It has a northern humid subtropical climate, with four seasons.

== Transportation ==
Ruckersville has major routes going through it. They are U.S. Route 29, and U.S. Route 33. U.S. 33 heads 13 miles (21 km) east to Gordonsville, 15 miles west (24 km) to Skyline Drive and 38 (61 km) to Harrisonburg. U.S. 29 heads 12 miles (19 km) north to Madison, and 29 (47 km) to Culpeper, it heads 16 miles (26 km) south to Charlottesville.

== Demographics ==
Historical population
Census	Pop.	Note	%±
2010	1,141		—
2020	1,484		30.1%
U.S. Decennial Census; 2010 2020

Ruckersville was first listed as a census designated place in the 2010 U.S. census.

As of the census of 2010, there were 1,141 people, 461 households, and 316 families residing in the CDP. The population density was 414.9 people per square mile (160.2 people/km^{2}). There were 512 housing units at an average density of 186.2 people per square mile (71.9 people/km^{2}). The racial makeup of the town was 85.5% White, 6.9% African American, 0.6% Native American, 1.1% Asian, 2.7% some other race, and 3.2% from two or more races. Hispanic or Latino of any race were 6.1% of the population.

There were 461 households in the CDP, out of which 30.6% had children under the age of 18 living with them, 52.5% were headed by married couples living together, 10.8% had a female householder with no husband present, and 31.5% were non-families. 26.5% of all households were made up of individuals, and 8.2% were someone living alone who was 65 years of age or older. The average household size was 2.48, and the average family size was 2.93.

In the CDP, 23.0% of the population were under the age of 18, 7.1% were from age 18 to 24, 22.8% were from 25 to 44, 28.6% were from 45 to 64, and 18.5% were 65 years of age or older. The median age was 43.5 years. For every 100 females there were 96.0 males, and for every 100 females age 18 and over, there were 94.0 males.

For the period 2011–15, the estimated median annual income for a household in the CDP was $53,962, and the median income for a family was $68,043. The per capita income for the CDP was $24,082.

== Ruckersville Parkway ==
In 2005, a pair of local politicians proposed a road, dubbed the "Ruckersville Parkway", that would directly connect Ruckersville to the southern edge of Charlottesville. However, objections from residents and planners caused the proposal to fail.
