= Elberton, Georgia =

City in the United States

- City
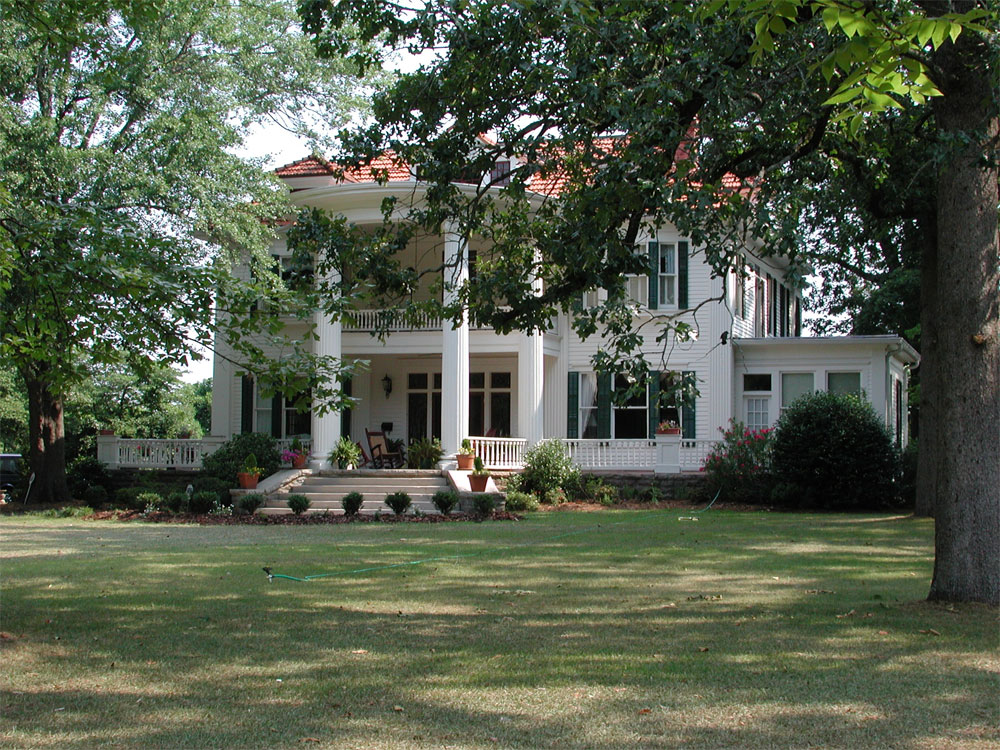
- A home along Elberton's Heard Street

- Seal
- Nickname: Granite Capital of the World
- Location in Elbert County and the state of Georgia
- Coordinates: 34°6′35″N 82°51′56″W
- Country: United States
- State: Georgia
- County: Elbert

Government
  - Mayor: R. Daniel Graves
  - City Manager: Kevin Eavenson (interim)

Area
  - Total: 4.58 sq mi (11.85 km^{2})
  - Land: 4.54 sq mi (11.76 km^{2})
  - Water: 0.035 sq mi (0.09 km^{2})
- Elevation: 702 ft (214 m)

Population (2020)
  - Total: 4,640
  - Density: 1,022.1/sq mi (394.64/km^{2})
- Time zone: UTC−05:00 (EST)
  - Summer (DST): UTC−04:00 (EDT)
- ZIP Code: 30635
- Area code: 706
- FIPS code: 13-26616
- GNIS feature ID: 0355658
- Website: www.cityofelberton.net

Elberton is the county seat and the largest city in Elbert County, Georgia, United States. As of the 2020 census, Elberton had a population of 4,640.

Elberton is known as the "granite capital of the world".

== History ==
Settled in the 1780s, Elbert was designated seat of the newly formed Elbert County in 1790. It was incorporated as a town in 1803 and as a city in 1896. Like Elbert County, Elberton is named for Samuel Elbert.

== Geography ==
Elberton is located near the center of Elbert County.

According to the United States Census Bureau, Elberton has a total area of 4.8 square miles (12.4 km^{2}), of which 4.7 square miles (12.3 km^{2}) is land and 0.04 square miles (0.1 km^{2}), or 0.72%, is water.

== Climate ==
According to the Köppen Climate Classification system, Elberton has a humid subtropical climate, abbreviated "Cfa" on climate maps. The hottest temperature recorded in Elberton was 109 °F (42.8 °C) on July 9, 1913, while the coldest temperature recorded was −6 °F (−21.1 °C) on December 13, 1962.

Climate data for Elberton, Georgia, 1991–2020 normals, extremes 1891–present
Month	Jan	Feb	Mar	Apr	May	Jun	Jul	Aug	Sep	Oct	Nov	Dec	Year
Record high °F (°C)	78 (26)	81 (27)	91 (33)	94 (34)	100 (38)	105 (41)	109 (43)	106 (41)	102 (39)	97 (36)	84 (29)	78 (26)	109 (43)
Mean maximum °F (°C)	68.4 (20.2)	71.9 (22.2)	80.3 (26.8)	84.5 (29.2)	88.4 (31.3)	93.1 (33.9)	94.7 (34.8)	94.2 (34.6)	90.6 (32.6)	83.8 (28.8)	76.0 (24.4)	70.0 (21.1)	95.7 (35.4)
Mean daily maximum °F (°C)	53.2 (11.8)	57.1 (13.9)	65.1 (18.4)	73.2 (22.9)	79.8 (26.6)	86.2 (30.1)	89.2 (31.8)	87.8 (31.0)	82.6 (28.1)	73.2 (22.9)	63.1 (17.3)	55.0 (12.8)	72.1 (22.3)
Daily mean °F (°C)	41.7 (5.4)	44.7 (7.1)	51.6 (10.9)	59.6 (15.3)	67.7 (19.8)	75.4 (24.1)	78.8 (26.0)	77.6 (25.3)	71.5 (21.9)	60.5 (15.8)	49.9 (9.9)	43.6 (6.4)	60.2 (15.7)
Mean daily minimum °F (°C)	30.2 (−1.0)	32.2 (0.1)	38.1 (3.4)	46.0 (7.8)	55.6 (13.1)	64.6 (18.1)	68.3 (20.2)	67.4 (19.7)	60.5 (15.8)	47.9 (8.8)	36.8 (2.7)	32.2 (0.1)	48.3 (9.1)
Mean minimum °F (°C)	13.7 (−10.2)	18.0 (−7.8)	22.6 (−5.2)	29.9 (−1.2)	39.7 (4.3)	53.0 (11.7)	59.9 (15.5)	57.9 (14.4)	46.0 (7.8)	31.2 (−0.4)	22.5 (−5.3)	18.0 (−7.8)	12.0 (−11.1)
Record low °F (°C)	−5 (−21)	1 (−17)	10 (−12)	21 (−6)	30 (−1)	38 (3)	50 (10)	48 (9)	28 (−2)	19 (−7)	11 (−12)	−6 (−21)	−6 (−21)
Average precipitation inches (mm)	4.39 (112)	4.19 (106)	4.62 (117)	3.51 (89)	3.55 (90)	4.57 (116)	4.81 (122)	4.26 (108)	3.68 (93)	3.34 (85)	3.87 (98)	4.63 (118)	49.42 (1,254)
Average snowfall inches (cm)	0.2 (0.51)	0.2 (0.51)	0.0 (0.0)	0.0 (0.0)	0.0 (0.0)	0.0 (0.0)	0.0 (0.0)	0.0 (0.0)	0.0 (0.0)	0.0 (0.0)	0.0 (0.0)	0.0 (0.0)	0.4 (1.02)
Average precipitation days (≥ 0.01 in)	10.9	9.7	10.0	8.4	8.5	10.4	9.6	9.8	7.5	6.6	8.2	10.3	109.9
Average snowy days (≥ 0.1 in)	0.1	0.1	0.0	0.0	0.0	0.0	0.0	0.0	0.0	0.0	0.0	0.0	0.2
Source 1: NOAA
Source 2: National Weather Service

== Demographics ==
Historical population
Census	Pop.	Note	%±
1810	122		—
1840	210		—
1880	927		—
1890	1,572		69.6%
1900	3,834		143.9%
1910	6,483		69.1%
1920	6,475		−0.1%
1930	4,650		−28.2%
1940	6,188		33.1%
1950	6,772		9.4%
1960	7,107		4.9%
1970	6,438		−9.4%
1980	5,686		−11.7%
1990	5,682		−0.1%
2000	4,743		−16.5%
2010	4,653		−1.9%
2020	4,640		−0.3%
U.S. Decennial Census

=== 2020 census ===
As of the 2020 census, Elberton had a population of 4,640. The median age was 41.4 years. 23.3% of residents were under the age of 18 and 21.9% were 65 years of age or older. For every 100 females there were 83.2 males, and for every 100 females age 18 and over there were 77.6 males age 18 and over.

96.9% of residents lived in urban areas, while 3.1% lived in rural areas.

There were 1,934 households and 997 families in Elberton. Of the households, 30.3% had children under the age of 18 living in them. Of all households, 31.8% were married-couple households, 19.5% were households with a male householder and no spouse or partner present, and 43.2% were households with a female householder and no spouse or partner present. About 35.1% of all households were made up of individuals, and 18.3% had someone living alone who was 65 years of age or older.

There were 2,241 housing units, of which 13.7% were vacant. The homeowner vacancy rate was 4.2% and the rental vacancy rate was 6.9%.

Elberton racial composition as of 2020
Race	Num.	Perc.
White	2,244	48.36%
African American	1,860	40.09%
Native American	11	0.24%
Asian	57	1.23%
Other/mixed	148	3.19%
Hispanic or Latino	320	6.9%

== Economy ==
The historic Elbert Theatre

=== Granite ===
Elberton claims the title "granite capital of the world". The city's post-Civil War history has largely revolved around the industry, following the opening of the first commercial quarry and manufacturing plant by Nathaniel Long in 1889. As the industry grew in the early 1900s, so did Elberton's importance on the passenger and freight railroad lines, bringing many travelers and businessmen to the city and leading to its heyday.

Several granite monuments, including the now-destructed Georgia Guidestones, are located in or near Elberton.

Elberton's Granite Bowl seats 20,000 and formerly featured a retired Sanford Stadium (University of Georgia) scoreboard.

The city is home to the Elberton Granite Museum and Exhibit, with a notable exhibit being "Dutchy", a Confederate monument made of granite that was removed from the town square due to its appearance.

=== Southeastern Power ===
Since 1950, Elberton has served as the headquarters of the Southeastern Power Administration, a division of the United States Department of Energy. The authority markets power generated by the United States Army Corps of Engineers across the southern United States. The authority recently moved from its downtown headquarters in the former Samuel Elbert Hotel to a new building on Athens Tech Drive on the western end of the city.

== Government ==
Elberton operates under a council-manager form of government. In this style of government, the city manager is responsible for the day-to-day operations of the city, the five-person elected council serves as a board of directors, and the mayor performs more ceremonial duties and presides over council.

The City of Elberton operates Elberton Utilities, a comprehensive utility system which includes electric, gas, water, sewer, cable television, and internet services.

The Elbert Theatre reopened in 2001 after extensive renovations.

== Education ==
=== Elbert County School District ===
The city is served by the Elbert County School District. One learning center, one primary school, one elementary school, one middle school, and one high school are located within the city. The district has 194 full-time teachers and over 3,079 students. The school system is one of the county's largest employers.

=== Private education ===
Elberton Christian School was located on Rhodes Drive in the city, but has closed.

=== Colleges and universities ===
Athens Technical College operates a full satellite campus on the western end of the city, near the elementary school, middle school, and high school.

== Media ==
Elberton is currently served by one newspaper, The Elberton Star, though several others (including the Elbert County Examiner and the Elbert Beacon, both of which merged with the Star) have covered the city over the years. The Star has been published since 1887.

The Anderson (S.C.) Independent-Mail publishes a daily Northeast Georgia edition which covers the Elberton area.

The city is served by four local radio stations. WSGC-AM 1400, which plays an oldies format, is one of Georgia's oldest, having been on the air since 1947. WSGC-FM 92.1 and WXKT-FM 100.1 play country music while WLVX-FM 105.1 specializes in R&B.

Elberton is in the Greenville-Spartanburg-Asheville television market, though local cable and satellite providers also carry stations from the Atlanta market.

== Infrastructure ==
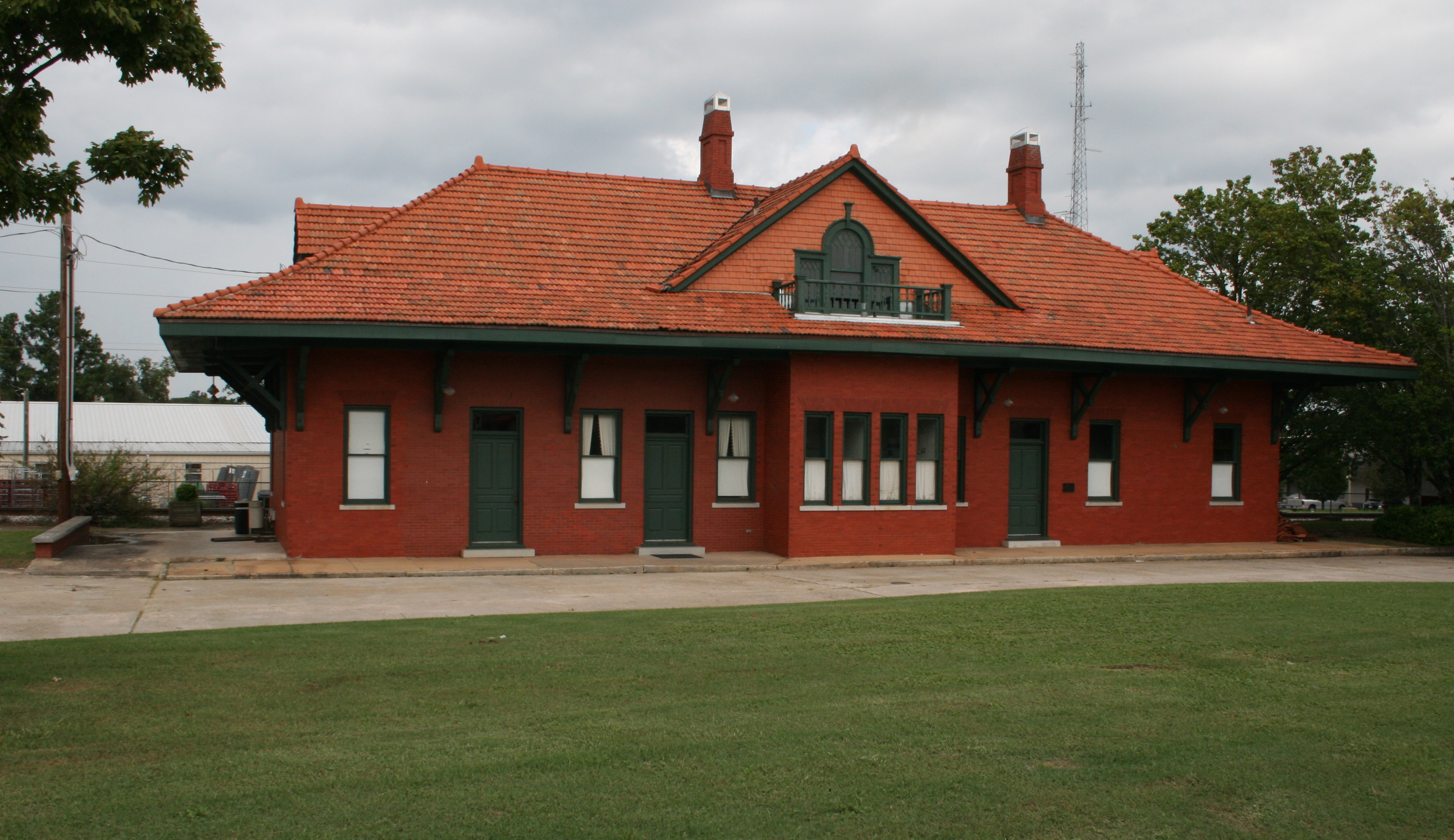
Elberton Depot

=== Transportation ===
==== Highways ====
Highways in Elberton include Georgia State Route 72 and Georgia State Route 77.

==== Airports ====
Elberton and Elbert County are served locally by the Elbert County-Patz Field Airport, located just east of the city on State Route 72.

==== Railroad ====
For many years, Elberton was an important passenger and freight stop on the main line of the Seaboard Air Line Railroad. The line is now operated by CSX Transportation and remains in use for freight transportation. A spur line connects Elberton to a main line of the Norfolk Southern Railway (formerly Southern Railway).

=== Healthcare ===
Elbert Memorial Hospital, founded in 1950, is a 25-bed acute care critical access hospital with emergency, surgical, and rehabilitation facilities.

== Notable people ==
- Brent Adams, NFL offensive lineman for Atlanta Falcons and Los Angeles Rams
- Amos T. Akerman, U.S. Attorney General under Ulysses S. Grant, fought railroad corruption and the Ku Klux Klan
- William Wyatt Bibb, appointed first governor of Alabama, U.S. senator, 1813–1816
- Paul Brown, 14-term U.S. congressman, 1933–1961
- Clark Gaines, NFL running back for New York Jets
- George Rockingham Gilmer, two-term governor of Georgia, U.S. congressman
- Derek Harper, University of Illinois and 16-year NBA point guard
- Corra May Harris, early 20th century author, lived at Farm Hill
- Nancy Hart, Revolutionary War heroine
- Stephen Heard, governor of Georgia, 1780–1781
- William H. Heard, former slave, clergyman and U.S. ambassador to Liberia
- Joseph Rucker Lamar, former United States Supreme Court justice
- Meriwether Lewis, of the Lewis and Clark Expedition, lived in Elbert County
- Juanita Marsh, third female judge in Georgia, 2020 Georgia Women of Achievement inductee
- Arnall Patz, discovered cause of blindness in premature infants and helped develop laser treatment of diabetic retinopathy
- Charles Tait, U.S. senator, 1809–1819
- Wiley Thompson, U.S. congressman and Indian agent, oversaw removal of Seminoles from Florida (Second Seminole War)
- Daniel Tucker, preacher, possible subject of "Old Dan Tucker" song
- Chester Willis, former NFL halfback

== Sister cities ==
Elberton has a sister city, Mure, Kagawa, Japan, as designated by Sister Cities International.

== See also ==
- Georgia–Carolina Memorial Bridge
