= Murder of Meredith Emerson =

2008 crime in Georgia, United States

Meredith Hope Emerson
- Born: June 20, 1983; Charleston, South Carolina, U.S.
- Died: January 4, 2008 (aged 24); Dawson County, Georgia, U.S.
- Education: University of Georgia (B.A., 2005)

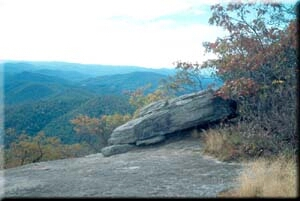
The view from Blood Mountain where Meredith Emerson went hiking

Meredith Hope Emerson (June 20, 1983 – January 4, 2008) was a 24-year-old woman who was murdered in January 2008 by drifter Gary Michael Hilton. She was last seen alive hiking with her black Labrador Retriever on Blood Mountain in northern Georgia on New Year's Day 2008. Witnesses claimed to have seen her with an older man on the Spur Trail connecting the Appalachian Trail with the Byron Herbert Reece Parking Lot. When she did not return home on January 2, 2008, her friends began to search for her, without success. Her dog, Ella, was found on January 4, 2008, in Cumming, Georgia, approximately 60 miles (97 km) away.

At the time of her disappearance, Emerson lived in Buford, Georgia.

== Biography ==
Emerson was born in Charleston, South Carolina. She was raised in Holly Springs, North Carolina, a suburb of Raleigh, and in Longmont, Colorado. Emerson graduated from Niwot High School. In 2005, she graduated with honors from the University of Georgia with a bachelor's degree in French and was given the Cecil Willcox Award for Excellence in French.

== Investigation ==
On January 3, 2008, authorities located Emerson's 1995 Chevrolet Cavalier, where they found various items such as her water bottle, a dog leash, and a police baton. A local drifter and then-unidentified serial killer, 61-year-old man Gary Michael Hilton, was announced as a person of interest in her disappearance.

On January 4, three days after Emerson and Ella were last seen, a witness at a Chevron gas station called DeKalb police and stated that "the guy you are looking for is cleaning out his van." The police quickly arrived on scene and were able to stop Hilton before he could bleach the interior of the van. Crime scene analysts obtained blood evidence that was matched to Emerson's DNA. Hilton was subsequently arrested and charged with Emerson's murder. The same day, Ella was found alive wandering in a Kroger parking lot in Cumming and she was safely returned to Emerson's family. The next day, more of Emerson's belongings would be found in a dumpster near a QuikTrip elsewhere in the city: her bloodied clothing, wallet, driver's license, a University of Georgia ID card, and a bloodstained car seat belt.

The prosecution agreed to take the death penalty off the table and find a new home for Hilton's dog, Dandy, if Hilton would lead investigators to her body. Hilton agreed and successfully led investigators to Emerson's body. Hilton claimed he had asked Emerson for her debit card PIN and that when she failed to give him the correct number, he kept her for four days before killing her with a tire iron. Hilton stated he could not bring himself to kill her dog and that when it came to the woman herself, "It was hard ... you gotta remember we had spent several good days together."

== Conviction ==
On January 30, 2008, Gary Hilton entered a plea of guilty to the murder of Emerson. He was sentenced to life in prison with the possibility for parole in 30 years. Hilton was later linked to and then charged with three additional murders: the October 2007 murders of elderly couple John and Irene Bryant in North Carolina, and the December 2007 murder of 46-year-old nurse Cheryl Dunlap in Florida. It has been speculated that Hilton might also be responsible for the 1997 murder of Judy Smith. This is because Hilton had left one of his victims in a similar condition near where Smith's body was discovered. In 2011, Hilton was tried for Dunlap's murder and was sentenced to death. In 2012, Hilton pleaded guilty to the kidnapping and murder of the Bryants, for which he was sentenced to life in prison.

== Crime scene photo controversy ==
On February 25, 2010, Hustler magazine reporter Fred Rosen asked for the Meredith Emerson crime scene and autopsy photos as part of an open records request filed with the Georgia Bureau of Investigation (GBI). The victim's family requested that the request must be denied according to attorney Lindsay Haigh. In March 2010, DeKalb Superior Court Judge Daniel Coursey issued a temporary order restraining the GBI from releasing "any and all photographs, visual images or depictions of Meredith Emerson which show Emerson in an unclothed or dismembered state." This order came on the same date that the Georgia House Governmental Affairs Committee unanimously passed "The Meredith Emerson Memorial Privacy Act", which prevents crime scene photos from being publicly released or disseminated, according to Rep. Jill Chambers. House Bill 1322 stops the dissemination of images of victims who in the photos appear "nude, bruised, bloodied or in a broken state with open wounds, a state of dismemberment or decapitation."

"We have to walk the line between open record laws and the constitutional provisions that allow women to be able to be photographed nude or in pornography when they knowingly and willingly offer their bodies for dissemination," Chambers stated. "Meredith isn't in a position to give that kind of permission to have her exploited in that kind of venue...we're not only protecting future victims of crime, we're protecting the integrity of what happened to Meredith."

Hustler's response was through an email that said, "Hustler is aware of the GBI's refusal to honor its reporter's request for copies of the Emerson crime scenes photos, which were to be used in a news story about this crime. Hustler and Mr. Flynt disagree with the GBI's position, and are currently exploring all legal options available to them should the decision be made to go forward with the story."

== See also ==
- List of solved missing person cases (post-2000)
