= Lake Trahlyta Spillway =

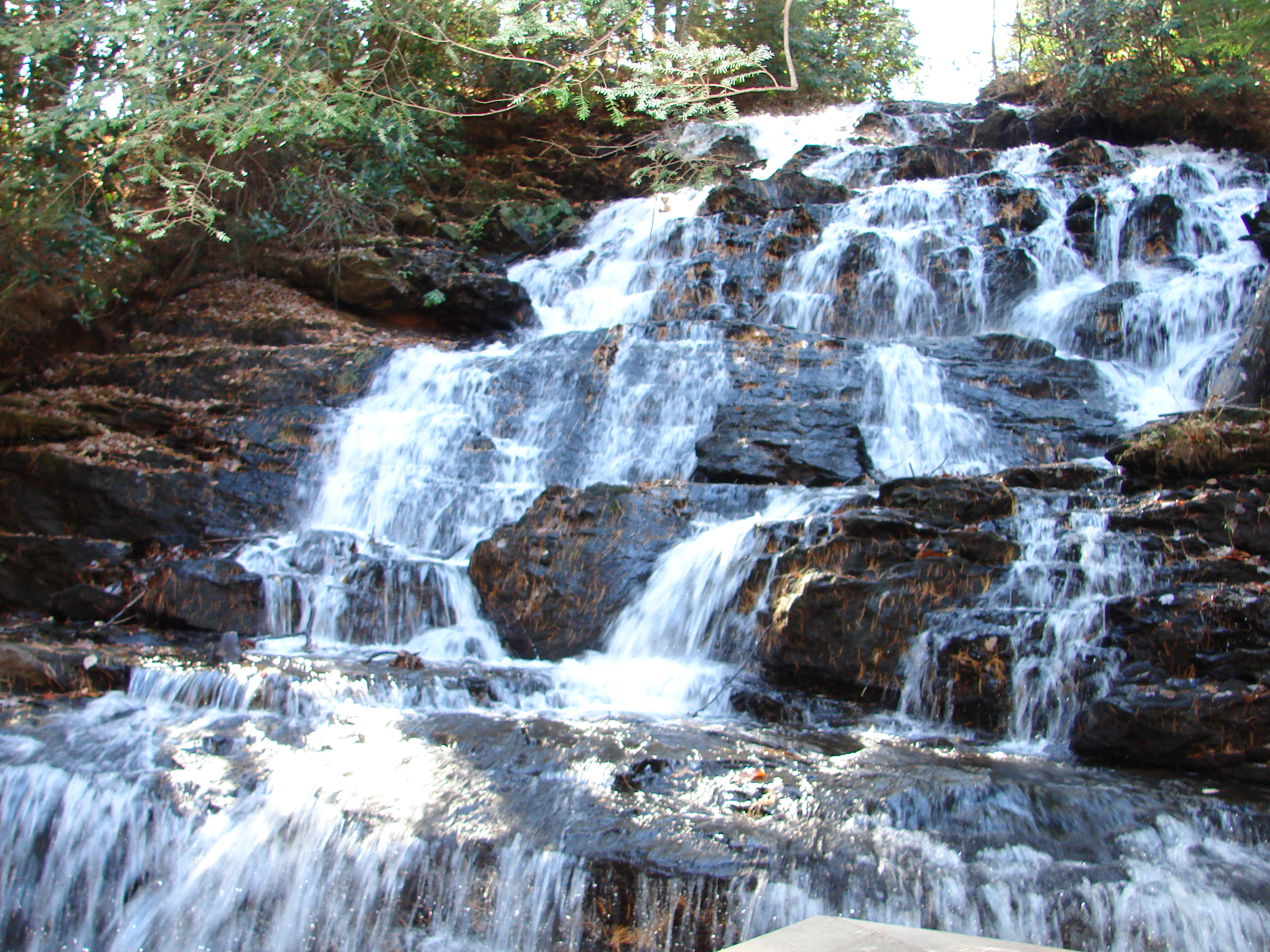
- Interactive map of Lake Trahlyta Spillway
- Location: Union County, Georgia, U.S.
- Coordinates: 34°46′12″N 83°54′59″W
- Type: Cascade
- Watercourse: Wolf Creek

Lake Trahlyta Spillway or Trahlyta Falls is a waterfall located in Union County, Georgia, United States. It is located within Vogel State Park. It is named for Trahlyta, a Cherokee maiden who is buried a few miles from the park at Stonepile Gap.

The 60-foot (18 m) tall waterfall abuts the 600-foot (180 m) long Vogel State Park Lake Dam or Lake Trahlyta Dam. The 52-foot (16 m) tall earthen embankment was built in the 1930s to create Lake Trahlyta.

== See also ==
- List of waterfalls
