= Slaughter Mountain =

Mountain in Georgia, United States

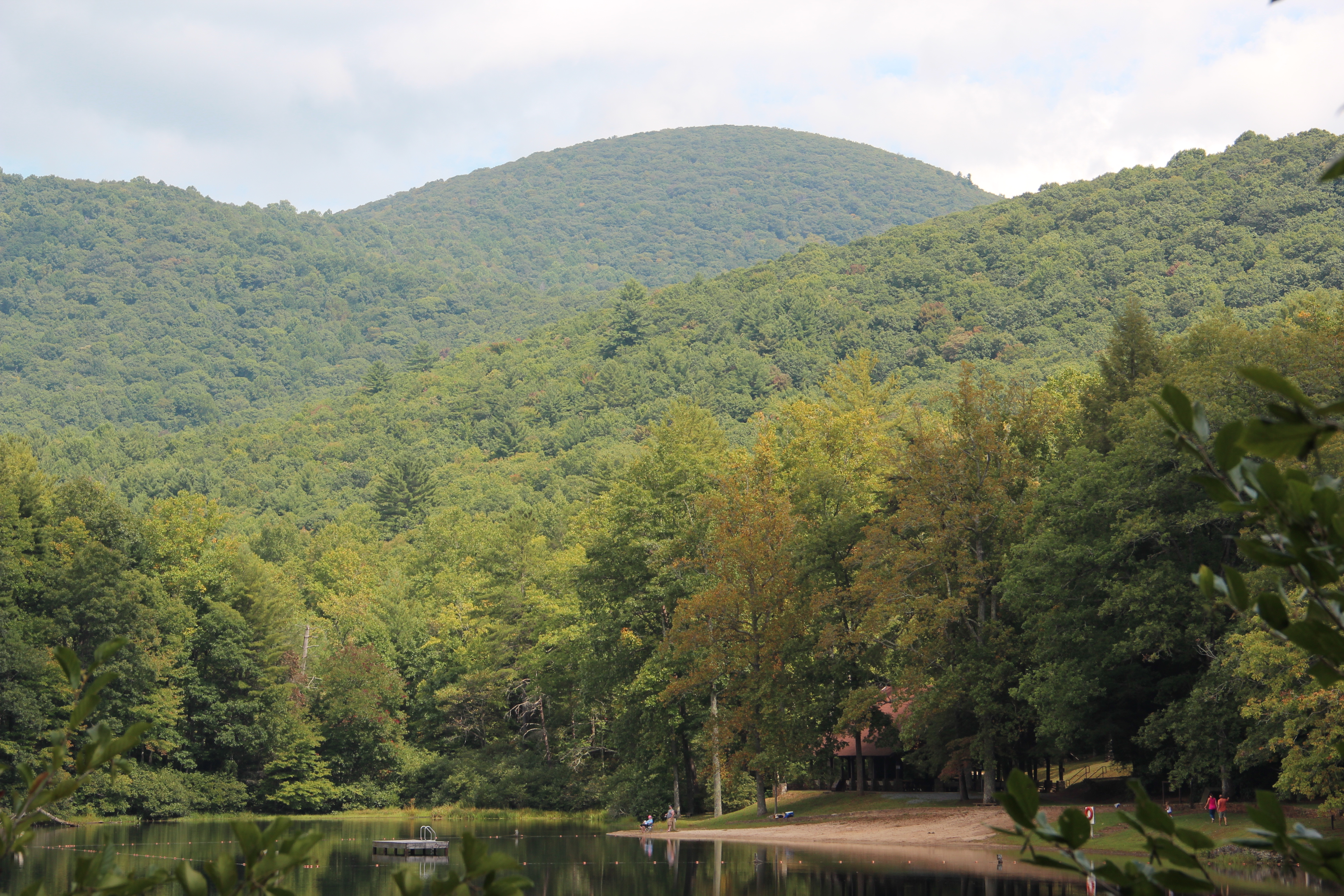
- Slaughter Mountain, viewed from Lake Winfield Scott

Highest point
- Elevation: 4,338 ft (1,322 m)
- Prominence: 458 ft (139.6 m)
- Coordinates: 34°44′53″N 83°57′01″W

Geography
- Location: Union County, Georgia, U.S.
- Parent range: Blue Ridge Mountains
- Topo map: USGS Neels Gap

Climbing
- Easiest route: Coosa Backcountry Trail, Duncan Ridge Trail

Slaughter Mountain, with an elevation of 4,338 ft (1,322 m), is the ninth-highest peak in the U.S. state of Georgia. It is located in Union County, Georgia and is the second-highest mountain in Union County. Its nearest higher neighbor is Blood Mountain, the highest peak in Union County and sixth-highest in Georgia.

Slaughter Mountain was named in commemoration of a bloody battle between the Cherokee and Creek Indians.

== Gallery ==
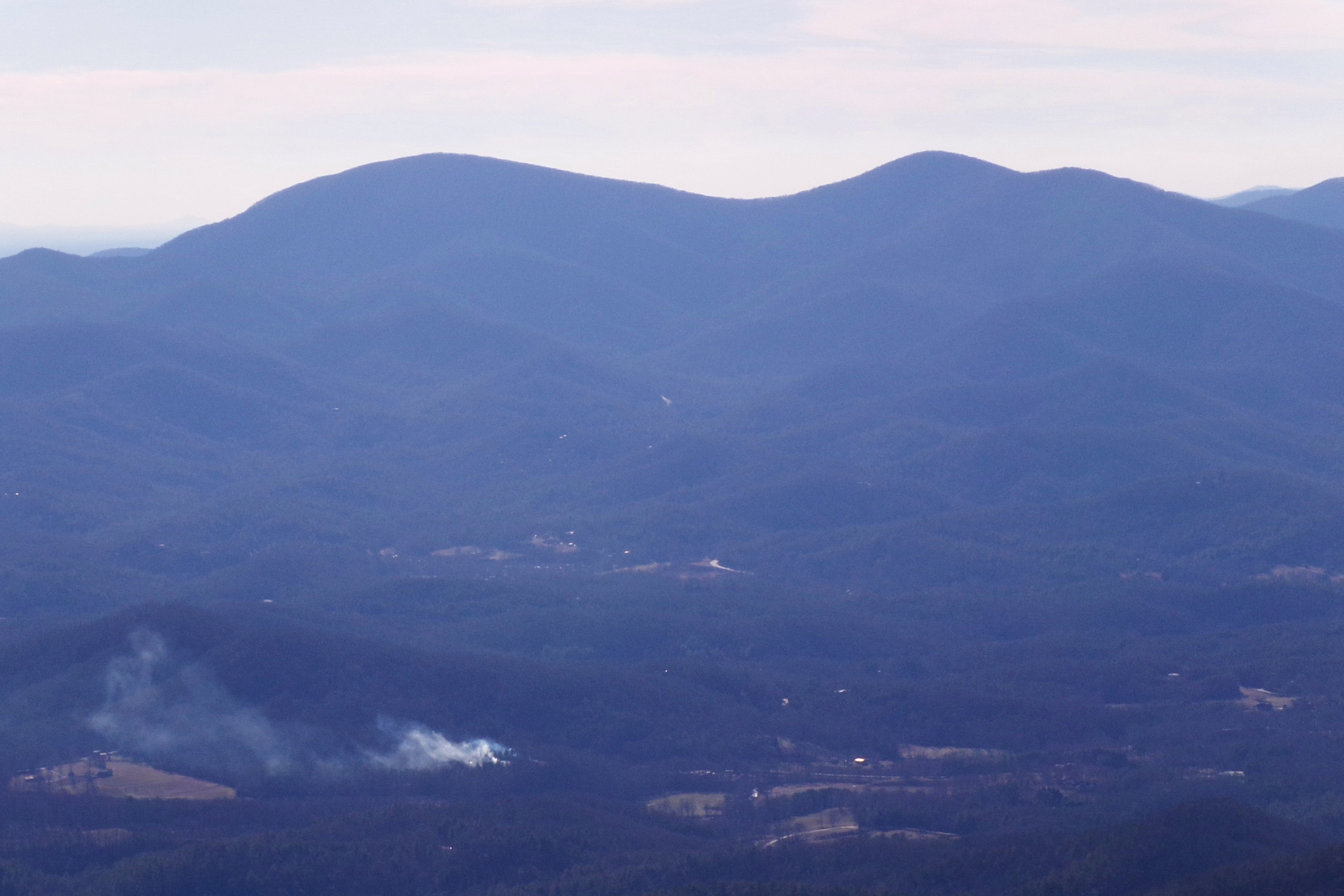
Blood Mountain (L) and Slaughter Mountain (R), as seen from Brasstown Bald

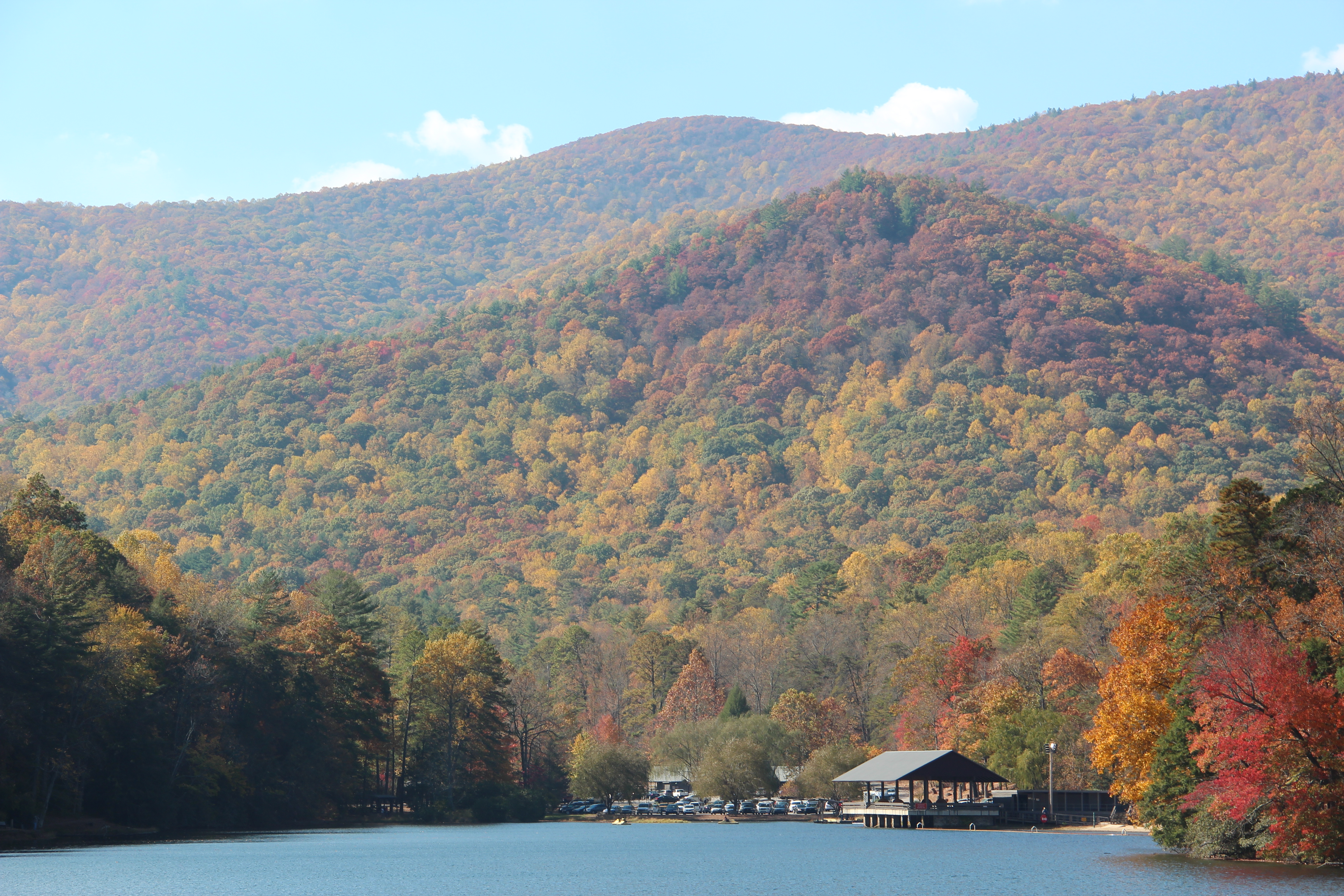
Slaughter Mountain viewed from Vogel State Park

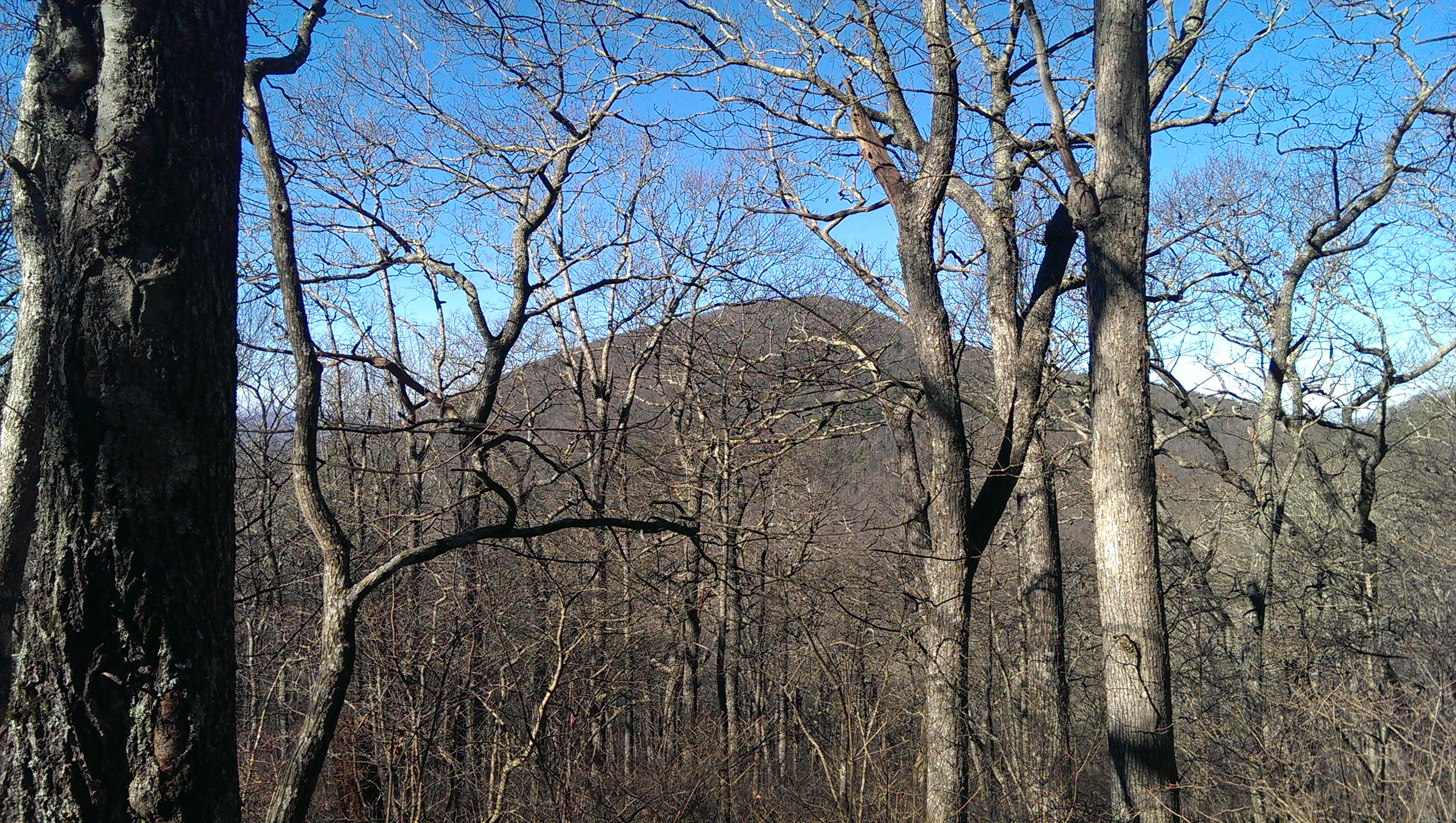
Slaughter Mountain viewed from the Appalachian Trail

== See also ==
- List of mountains in Georgia (U.S. state)
