= Lake Winfield Scott =

Lake in Georgia, United States

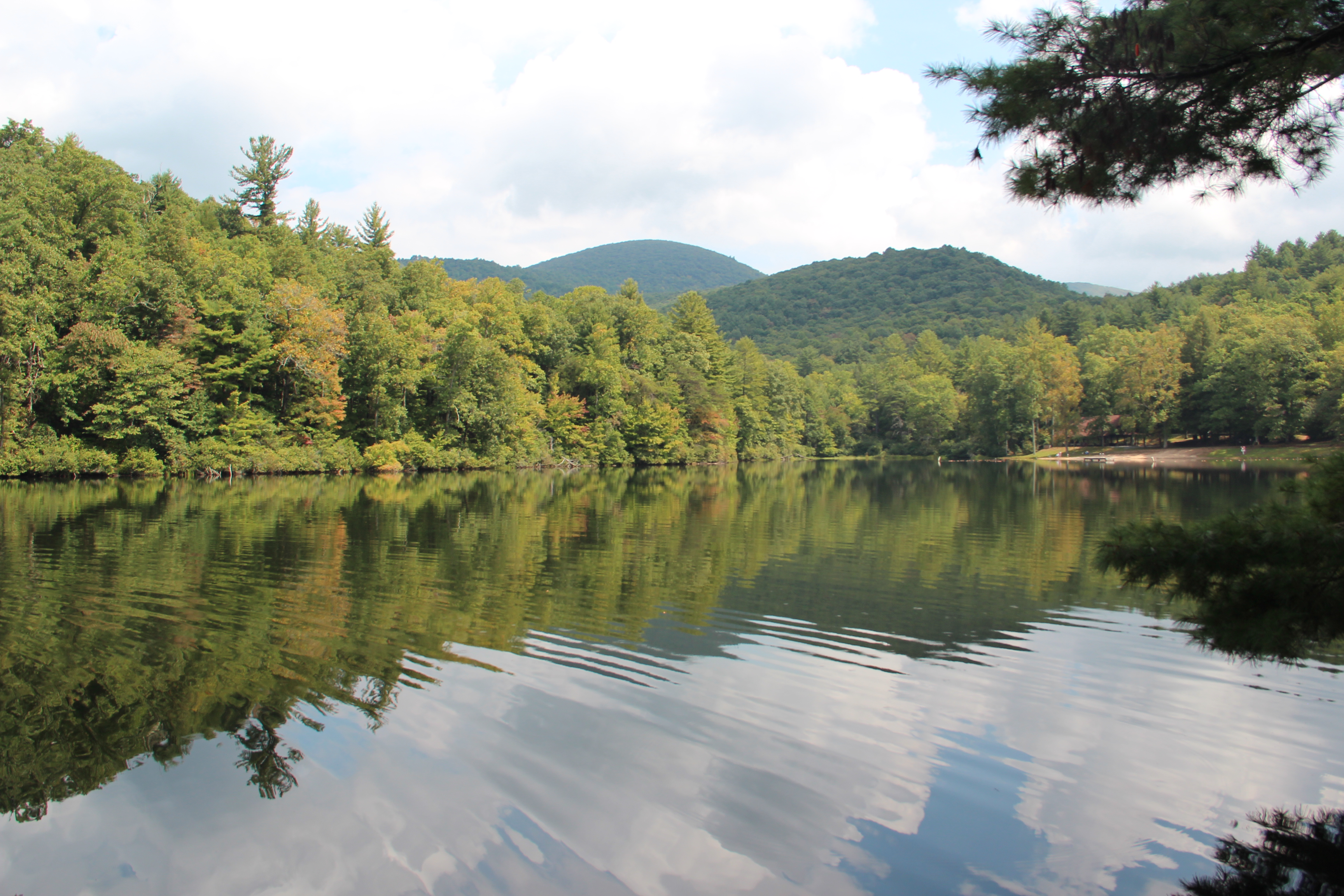
- A view of Lake Winfield Scott's shoreline

- Location within Georgia Location within the United States
- Location: Union County, Georgia, United States
- Coordinates: 34°44′26″N 83°58′33″W
- Lake type: reservoir
- Primary outflows: Cooper Creek
- Basin countries: United States
- Surface area: 18 acres (7.3 ha)
- Surface elevation: 2,854 ft (870 m)

Lake Winfield Scott is an 18-acre (7.3 ha) mountain lake located 10 miles (16 km) south of Blairsville, Georgia in Union County. The lake, which is owned and managed by the U.S. Forest Service, is the source of Cooper Creek. It is the centerpiece of the Forest Service's Lake Winfield Scott Recreation Area, a park which features hiking, fishing, boating and other outdoor activities. At 2,854 feet (870 m) elevation it is one of Georgia's highest altitude lakes. The various habitats surrounding the lake support a wide assortment of plants and animals.

== History ==
Completed in early 1942, Lake Winfield Scott is a man-made reservoir created as part of the Civilian Conservation Corps' efforts to establish recreational areas in north Georgia. It was the final CCC project in Georgia and one of the last in the nation, completed just after the United States' entry into World War II. It is located in the southern Blue Ridge Mountains near Blood Mountain.

The lake was named after General Winfield Scott, a 19th-century United States Army general, diplomat, and presidential candidate. Known as "Old Fuss and Feathers" and the "Grand Old Man of the Army", Scott was a hero of the Mexican–American War and the first American since George Washington to hold the rank of lieutenant general.

By the late 17th century the Cherokee and Creek had begun to compete for the same resources and fought a battle at nearby Slaughter Gap. The Creek lost, ceding the Blood Mountain area to the Cherokee, who considered it a holy place. Archaeological evidence has been discovered that tends to back the story of the battle, but the date of the battle and its participants are still disputed.

In 1838, the American Indians were removed from the area by General Winfield Scott and forced westward along the "Trail of Tears" Farmers moved in later, and by the 1880s lumber companies began logging the area. On May 14, 1938, the lake was first opened to the public as part of the Forest Service's multiple-use plan for administering the Chattahoochee National Forest for the "greatest good for the greatest number of people." During the 1990s, the U.S. Army Corps of Engineers rebuilt and strengthened the lake's dam.

== Location and surroundings ==
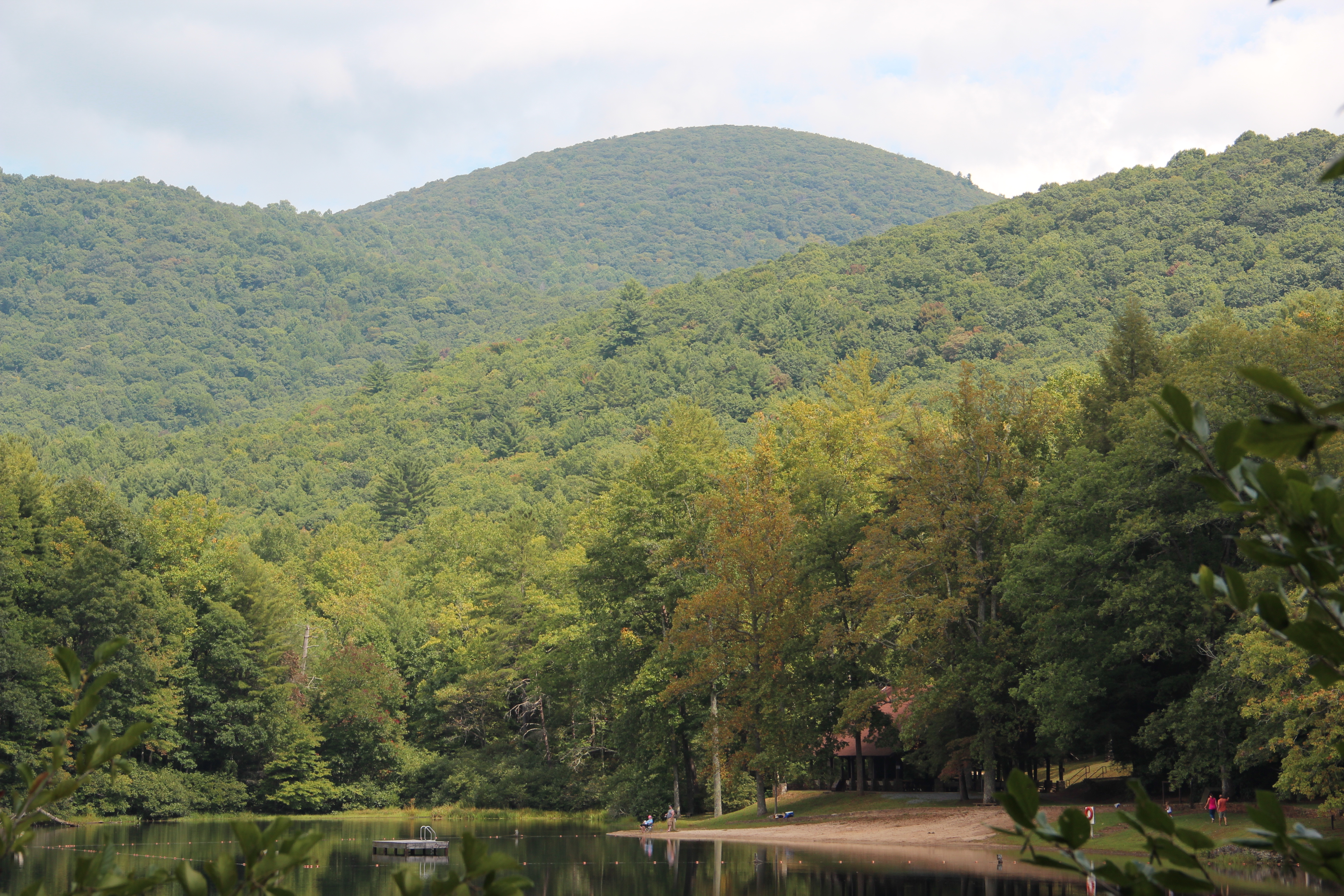
Slaughter Mountain viewed from Lake Winfield Scott

Lake Winfield Scott is 4.5 miles (7.2 km) east of Suches on Highway 180 and 7.1 miles (11.4 km) west of U.S. Highway 19/129 near Vogel State Park. Two roads provide access to the park, although the north entrance is only for lake access. The south entrance leads to the campgrounds, hiking trails and lakeshore facilities. The hardwood forests surrounding the lake and in Sosebee Gap offer brilliant autumn displays, making it a popular destination during the leaf season.

=== Wildlife and flora ===
Like the rest of the southern Blue Ridge Mountains, the area surrounding the lake consists of many valleys, ridges and mountains formed by repeated plate tectonic movement and collisions, starting with the Grenville Orogeny nearly 1.5 billion years ago. The resulting landscape created diverse topology containing many different species of plants and animal. Much of the area is similar to Pennsylvania in climate, vegetation and wildlife. The lake is near the southern limit for Eastern hemlock and Eastern white pine. Coves in the area vary by elevation and topography, with second-growth oak and hickory more common in lower-lying areas. Forests surrounding the lake contain rich, high-altitude flora including rare wildflowers and ferns, such as painted trillium, which grows near Rhododrendron. Boulderfields near Sosebee Cove include Dutchman's breeches, squirrel corn, waterleaf and other herbaceous plants.

The lake area is populated with white tail deer, grouse and raccoon. The deer population, which was extirpated by 1895, has rebounded since re-introduction by park ranger Arthur Woody during the 1930s. Over 100 species of birds inhabit or migrate through the area, including native songbirds such as the Canada, Blackburnian, black-throated blue, black-throated green and chestnut-sided warblers. Also found are hawks, owls, woodpeckers, kinglets, thrushes, vireos, cuckoos, phoebes, chickadees, titmice, nuthatches, brown creepers, wrens, tanagers, grosbeaks, indigo buntings and red crossbills. Migratory species are present during the late spring and early fall, making the area popular among birdwatchers. The creeks surrounding the lake are rich with different species of salamanders.

== Recreation ==
The recreational area encompassing the lake includes camping, picnicking, boating, fishing and a variety of hiking trails. Motorcyclists refer to the area as the starting point of "The Georgia Triangle", a scenic riding circuit beginning on Highway 180.

=== Fishing, boating and swimming ===
The small lake is a local favorite for fishing. Lake Winfield Scott is stocked with rainbow trout and also contains local species of warmwater fish such as largemouth bass and sunfish. Also on the lake are a boat ramp, boat dock and swimming area with a sand beach. The Forest Service allows only man-powered and electric-powered watercraft on the lake.

=== Camping and hiking trails ===
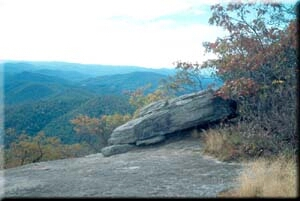
Hiking trails lead to the summit of nearby Blood Mountain

The recreational area has camping loops offer 36 campsites, including 21 which can accommodate tents and RVs; these sites provide utility hook-ups. There is also a group camping area which accommodates up to 25 people. The area houses comfort stations with flush toilets and showers. There is also one cabin available for rental. The recreational area includes a children's playground and picnic sites. The campground is open spring through fall and is administered by the USFS's Chattahoochee-Oconee National Forest/Blue Ridge Ranger District.

There are three trails at the lake. The 0.4-mile (640 m) Lake Winfield Scott Trail circles around the lake shore. This easy trail has portions which are wheelchair accessible. Jarrad Gap Trail and Slaughter Gap Trail share a common trailhead, located on the lake's southern tip. Both are approach trails to the nearby Appalachian Trail and are marked with blue blazes.

Slaughter Creek Trail passes through a hardwood forest on the south bank of Slaughter Creek for most of its distance, following a series of old roadbeds. It climbs 1,000 feet (300 m) over its 2.7-mile (4.3 km) path to Slaughter Gap (elevation 3,920 feet (1,190 m)), where it intersects the Appalachian Trail at the base of Blood Mountain. The trail passes through thickets of mountain laurel and rosebay rhododendron along the way, and crosses the creek at one point. Also present are excellent spring wildflower habitats. The summit of Blood Mountain is 1.4 miles (2.3 km) from Slaughter Gap along the Appalachian Trail.

Jarrard Creek Trail is an easy to moderate hike which leads southward 1.2 miles (1.9 km) to Jarrard Gap (elevation 3,300 feet (1,000 m)) on the Appalachian Trail. It follows Lances Branch creek through second-growth hardwood forests. Jarrard Creek Trail can be combined with Slaughter Creek Trail and a 2.1 miles (3.4 km) section of the Appalachian Trail to form a 6-mile (9.7 km) loop hike that starts and ends at the lake.
