= Gary Hilton (disambiguation) =

Gary Hilton may refer to:

- Gary Hilton (born 1946), American serial killer
- Gary Hilton (footballer) (1961-2021), English footballer, see List of Bury F.C. players (1–24 appearances)
