= Long Creek Falls =

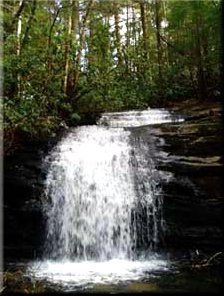
- Interactive map of Long Creek Falls
- Coordinates: 34.6678°N 84.1708°W
- Total height: 25 ft (7.6 m)
- Watercourse: Long Creek

Long Creek Falls is a waterfall located in Fannin County, Georgia. The falls are about 25 feet (7.6 meters) high. The falls are located in Chattahoochee National Forest near Three Forks, and are accessible from the Appalachian Trail, the Benton MacKaye Trail, and the Duncan Ridge Trail. Surrounded by rhododendrons, the falls are said to be particularly attractive in the spring rain.
