= Vogel State Park =

State park in Blairsville, Georgia, USA

- IUCN category V (protected landscape/seascape)
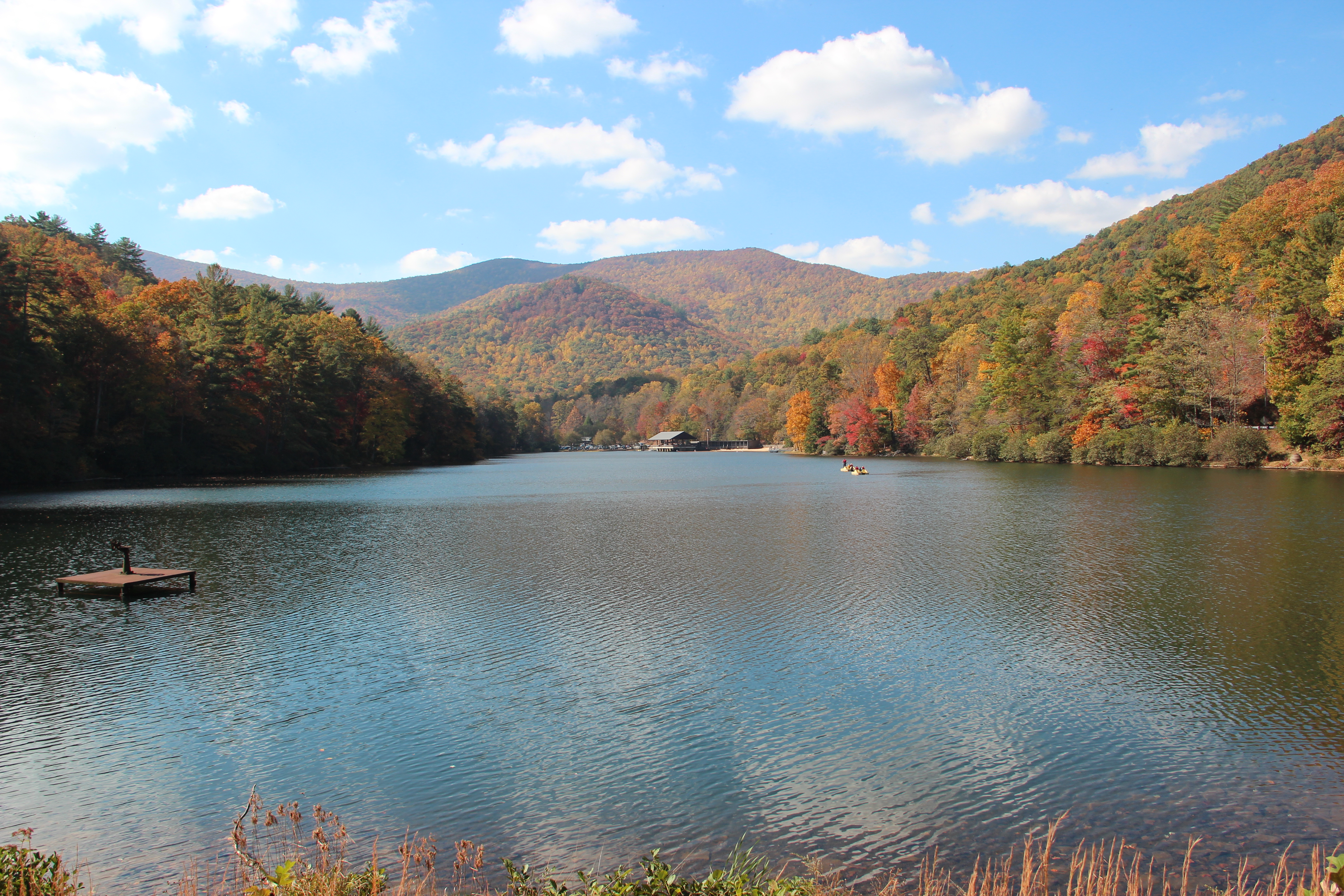
- View of Lake Trahlyta

- Location within Georgia Location within the United States
- Nearest city: Blairsville, Georgia
- Coordinates: 34.762778°N 83.927778°W
- Area: 233 acres (0.94 km^{2})
- Established: 1931
- Governing body: Georgia Department of Natural Resources

Vogel State Park is a 233-acre (0.94 km^{2}) or 94 hectares state park located at the base of Blood Mountain in the Chattahoochee National Forest. It became one of the first two parks in Georgia when it founded a state park system in 1931. Much of the park was constructed by the Civilian Conservation Corps during the 1930s.

The park features streams, a waterfall, and Lake Trahlyta. At 2,500 feet (760 m) elevation it is one of Georgia's highest altitude state parks. The mountainous habitats surrounding the lake support a wide assortment of plants and animals.

Within the park are a series of hiking trails. These include the Bear Hair Gap Trail and the more strenuous Coosa Backcountry Trail, which leads up toward Blood Mountain and the Appalachian Trail near Neel Gap. Vogel Park features camping sites, cabins, swimming, boating and other recreational activities. As of 2025, the park sees more than 350,000 visitors per year.

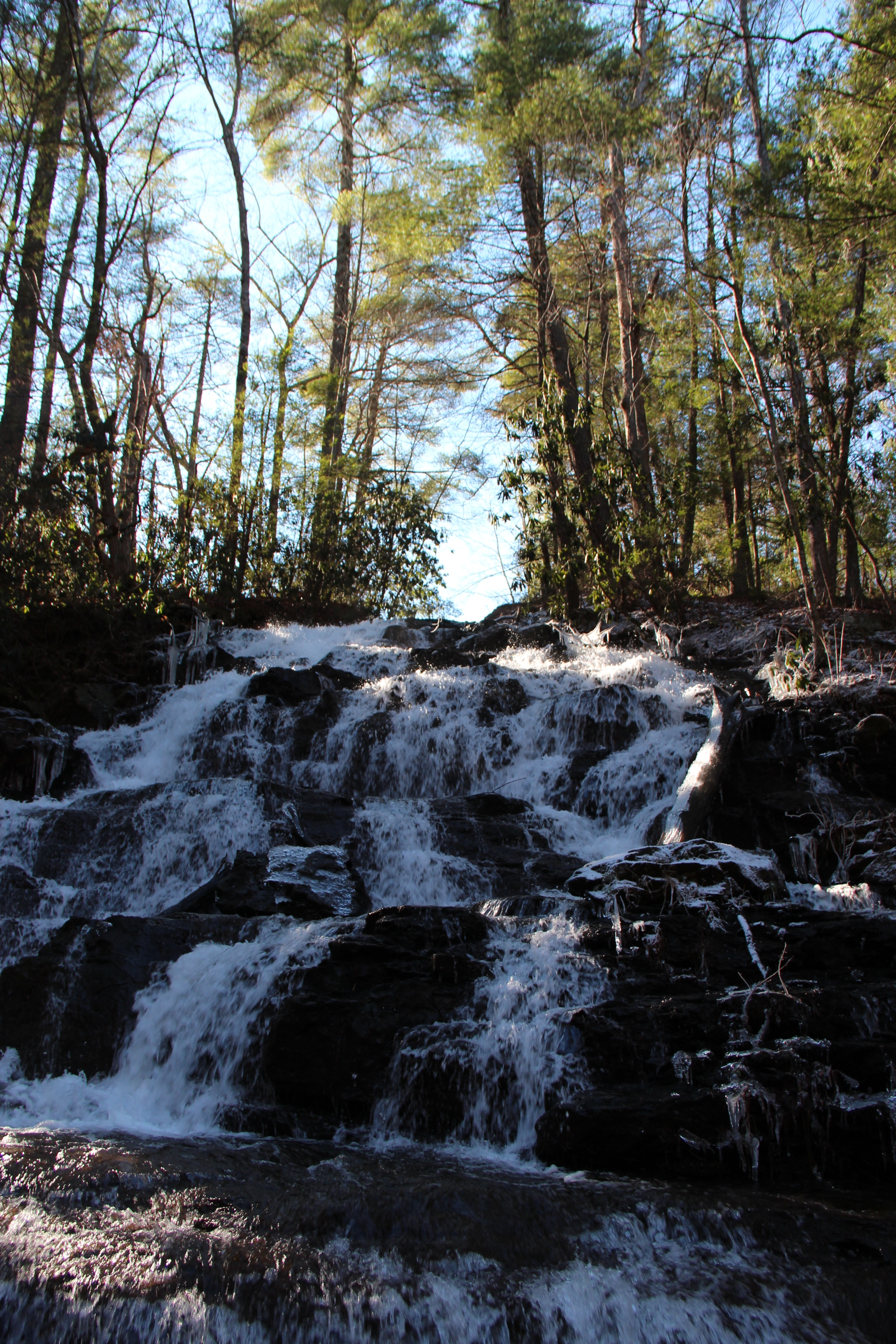
Lake Trahlyta Spillway.

== Description and history ==
Vogel State Park is located 11 miles (18 km) south of Blairsville on US Highway 19 in the north Georgia mountains. At nearly 2,500 feet (760 m) altitude, Vogel State Park is usually cool during the summer months, and is one of Georgia's most popular state parks. Vogel features hiking trails, cabins and a 20-acre (81,000 m^{2}) pond known as Lake Trahlyta, which was created when the Civilian Conservation Corps dammed Wolf Creek. The lake is named for Trahlyta, a Cherokee maiden who is buried a few miles from the park at Stonepile Gap. The Corps workers, located at the CCC Camp at Goose Creek just north of the park, also built the first cabins, picnic areas and camping grounds at Vogel.

Vogel is Georgia's second oldest state park. The land comprising the park was donated to the state in 1927 by August H. Vogel and Fred Vogel, Jr. of Milwaukee, Wisconsin. The two were heirs to the Pfister & Vogel Leather Company, a Wisconsin tannery founded by Frederick Vogel. The Vogel family harvested bark from oak and hemlock trees located on thousands of acres they owned in North Georgia. The bark was shipped to Wisconsin and used by the company for tanning leather. During World War I, a synthetic method to tan leather was developed so there was no further need for the north Georgia resources. The Vogels gave their land to Georgia to create the state park.

Vogel State Park Lake Dam, also known as Lake Trahlyta Dam, is a 52-foot (16 m) high earthen embankment. The 600-foot (180 m) long dam has a maximum discharge of 2,447 cubic feet (69.3 m^{3}) per second. Its capacity is 522 acre-feet (644,000 m^{3}), although its normal storage is 210 acre-feet (260,000 m^{3}). It drains an area of 1,638 acres (663 ha).

In 2025, the park opened a new 6,500-square-foot visitors center at the cost of nearly $5 million.

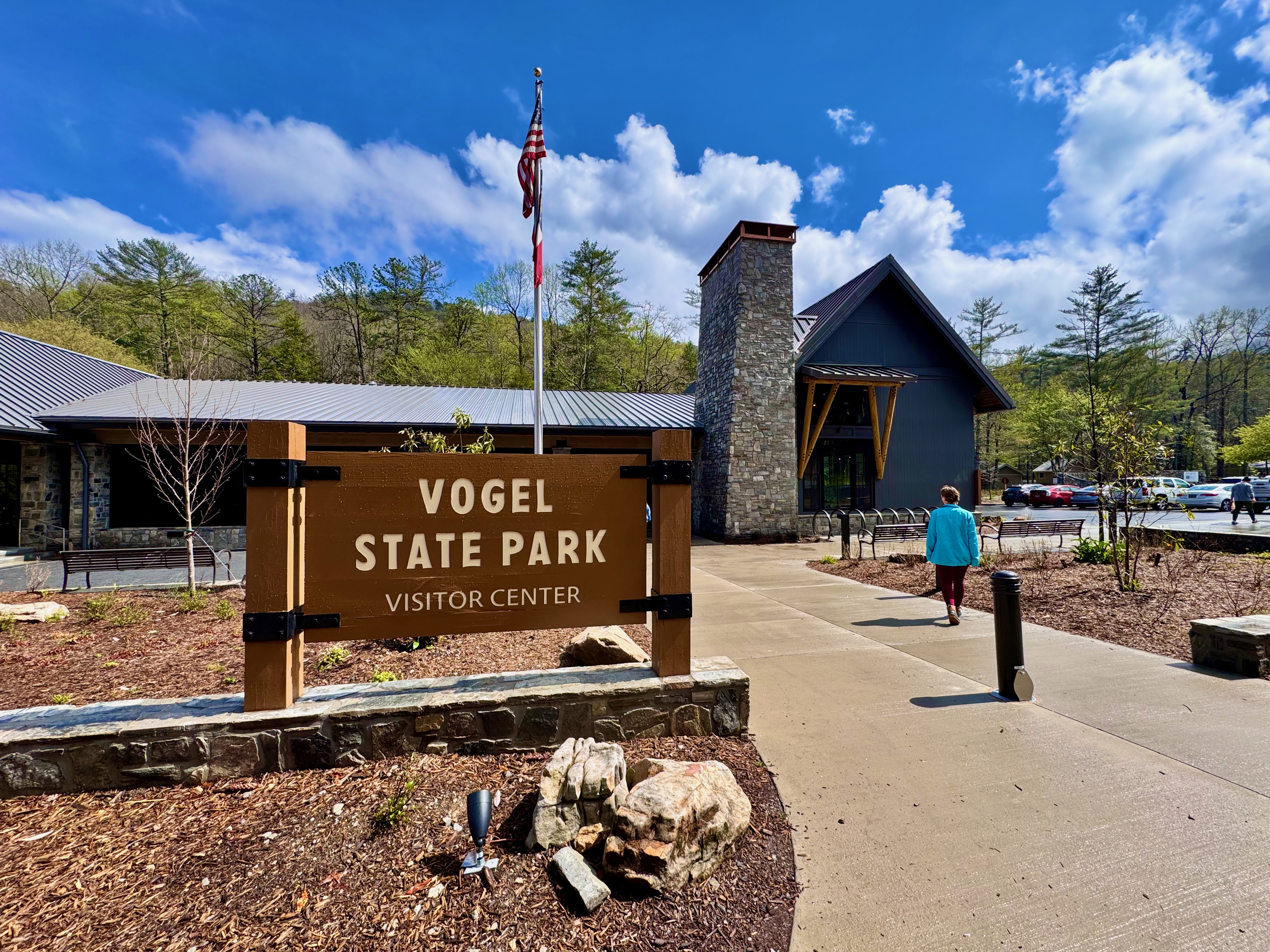
Visitor center

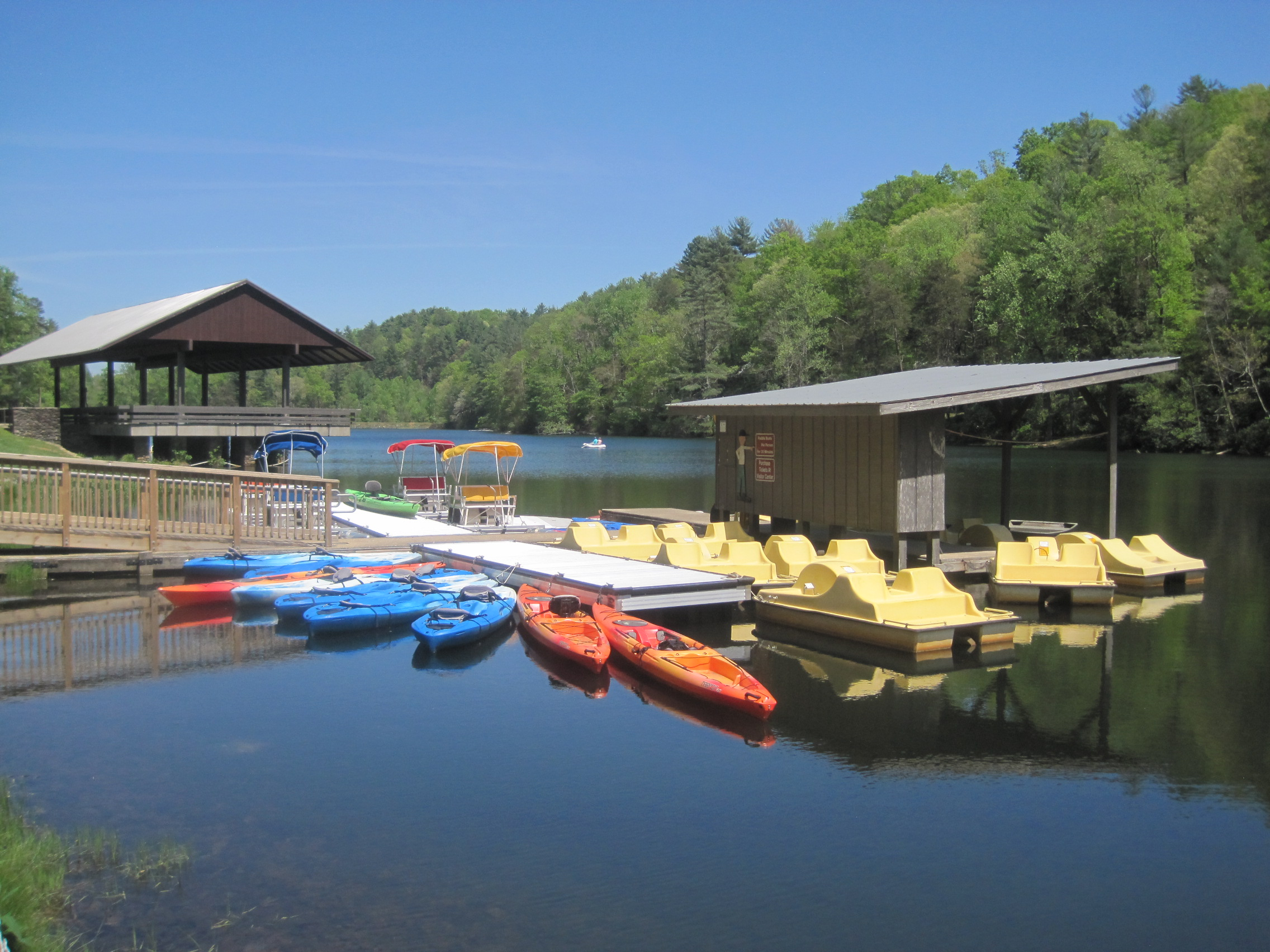
Boat dock

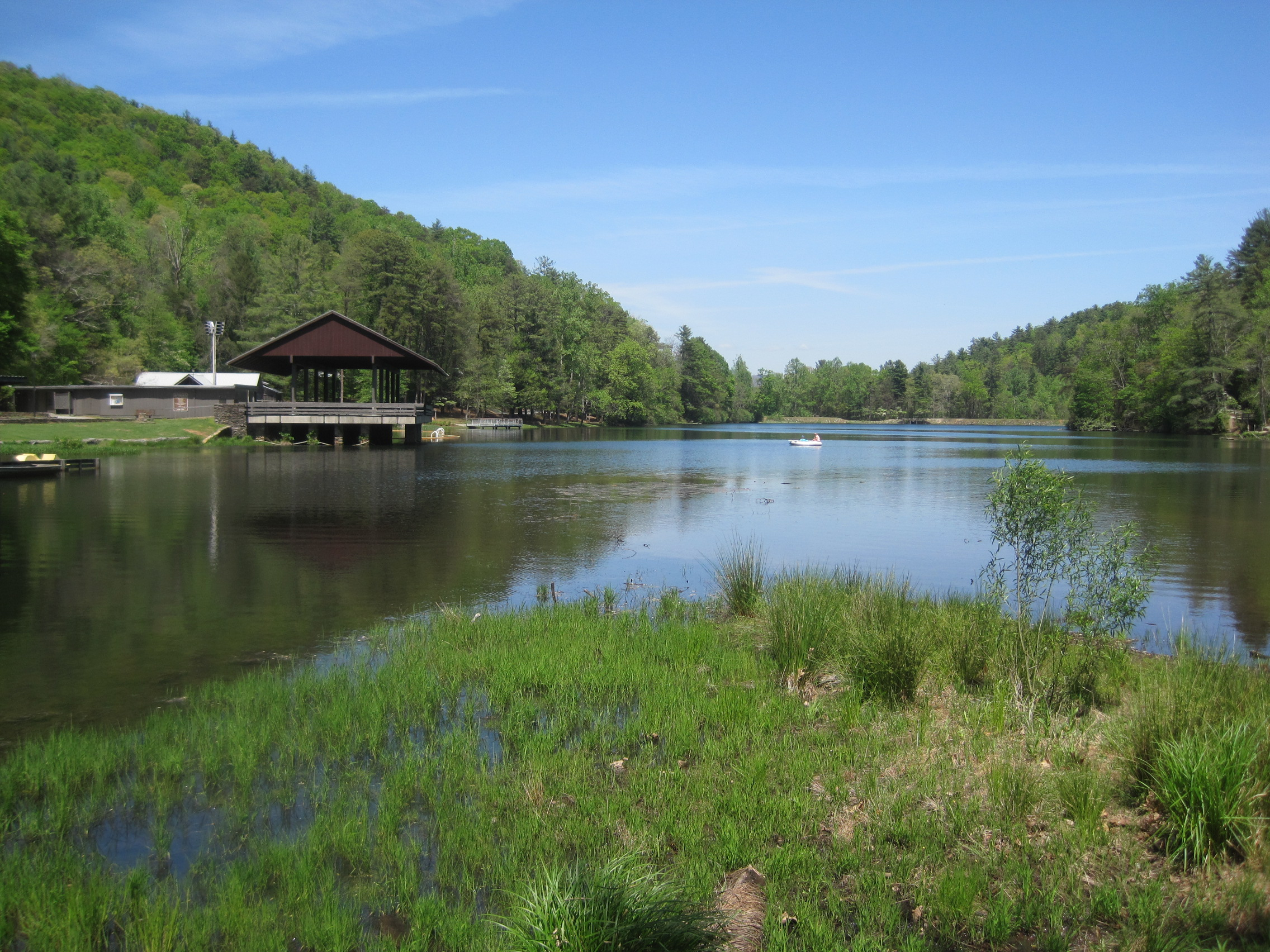
View looking northward across Lake Trahlyta

== Facilities and activities ==
Vogel State Park hosts a variety of outdoor activities, including camping, hiking, backpacking, boating, fishing and swimming. The park includes 103 tent, trailer and RV sites for camping, 18 walk-in campsites, and 35 cottages. About 95 of the camping sites contain electrical hookups and water. Also on site are four picnic shelters and a group camping facility, a pioneer campground, backwoods primitive campground areas and hot showers.

The centerpiece of the park is Lake Trahlyta. The lake has a swimming beach and boat launch for non-motorized watercraft, and offers seasonal rentals for pedal boats, kayaks, and paddle boards. It contains bass and bream and is stocked periodically during each trout season with about 5,000 trout. Also at the park are a general store, miniature golf course and a Civilian Conservation Corps museum.

=== Hiking ===
The park features four hiking trails, covering a wide variety of conditions, forest habitats and difficulties. These include the moderate difficulty 4-mile (6.4 km)-long Bear Hair Gap Trail marked by green blazes. It begins and ends in Vogel, although most of the trail loops through the Chattahoochee National Forest. The park also features a 1-mile (1.6 km) Trahlyta Lake Loop Trail and the Byron Herbert Reese Nature Trail (.8 miles).

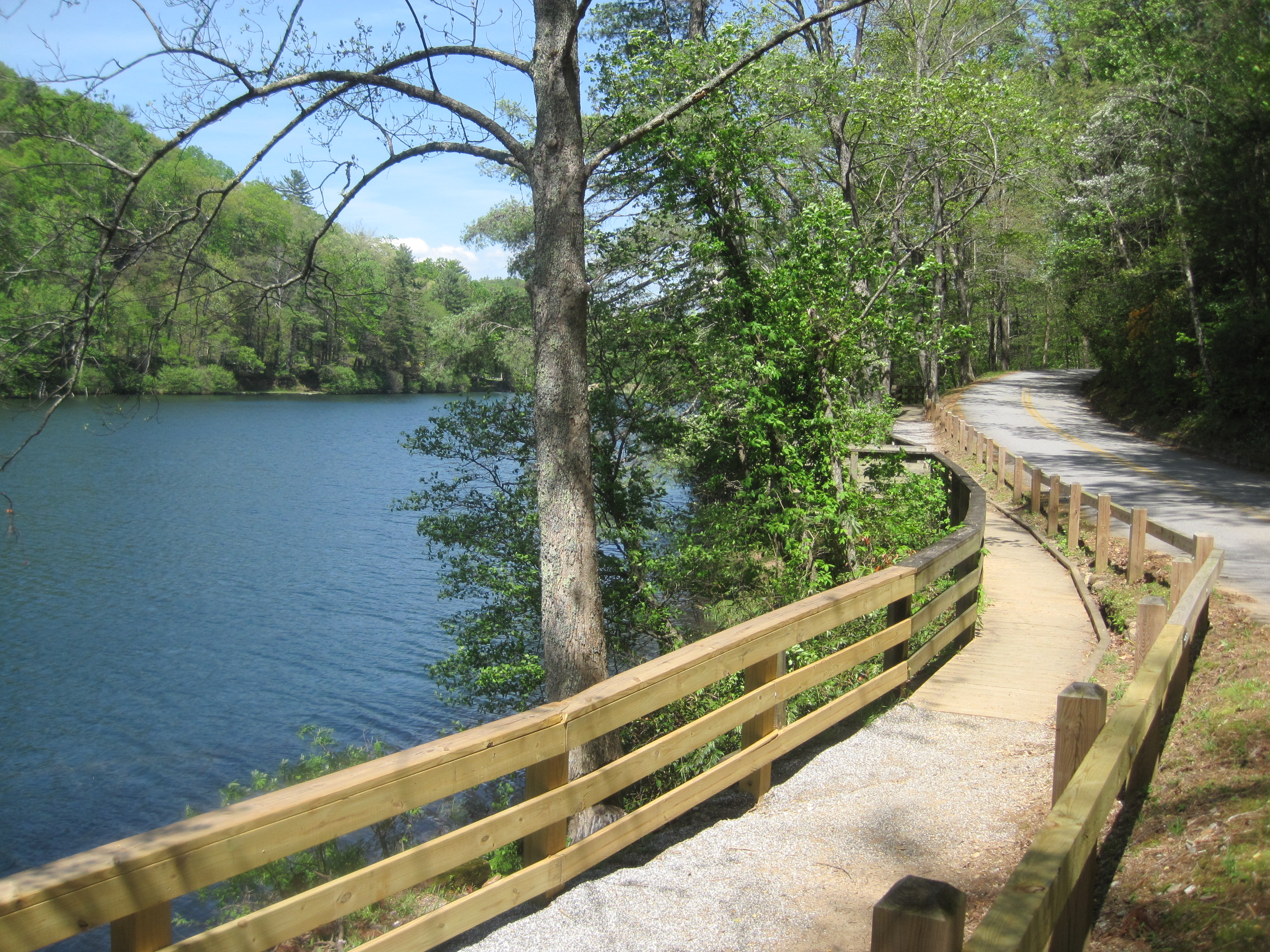
Walking trail around Lake Trahlyta

Also in the park is the Coosa Backcountry Trail, a strenuous 12.5-mile (20.1 km) loop which climbs Coosa Bald and Slaughter Mountain. The trail is marked with green blazes and is generally easy to follow. It fords streams on its lower segments before ascending Duncan's Ridge near the summit of Coosa Bald at over 4,000 feet (1,200 m) elevation, where it joins the Duncan Ridge Trail. The joined trail then makes a descent, then climbs slightly to the summit of Wildcat Knob, then descends to Wolfpen Gap where it crosses State Route 180. Across Wolfpen Gap, the trail makes a steep ascent up Slaughter Mountain, then descends to Slaughter Gap where the Coosa Backcountry and Duncan Ridge Trail split. From this point, the Duncan Ridge Trail leads directly to Blood Mountain where it meets the Appalachian Trail. The Coosa Backcountry Trail makes a steep 2,000 feet (610 m) descent down the mountain and joins with the Bear Hair Gap Trail, leading back to the point of origin. The Appalachian Trail can also be accessed from nearby Neel's Gap, just a little higher up Blood Mountain on Highway 19/129; hikers can reach this area from the Byron Herbert Reece Trail.

=== Annual events ===
Annual events held at the park include a springtime Wildflower Walk, CCC Reunion, Kids Fishing Rodeo, Independence Day flag-raising ceremony and bicycle parade, Mountain Music and Arts & Craft Festival held in September, Fall Hoedown, Duncan Ridge Trail 50K/30K Race and Christmas Tree Lighting.

== Wildlife, flora and geology ==
Like the rest of the southern Blue Ridge Mountains, Vogel State Park and the surrounding area consists of many valleys, ridges and mountains formed by repeated plate tectonic movement and collisions, starting with the Grenville Orogeny nearly 1.5 billion years ago. The resulting landscape created diverse topology containing many different species of plants and animal.

The Georgia Blue Ridge Mountains contains low-to-high-grade metamorphic rocks. Many of the rocks of the Blue Ridge appear to be the metamorphosed equivalents of Proterozoic and Paleozoic sedimentary rocks. Others are metamorphosed igneous rocks, including Corbin metagranite, Fort Mountain gneiss, varieties of mafic and ultramafic rocks, and the metavolcanic rocks of the Gold Belt.

Much of the area resembles Pennsylvania in climate, vegetation and wildlife. The park is near the southern limit for eastern hemlock and eastern white pine. Coves in the area vary by elevation and topography, with second-growth oak and hickory more common in lower-lying areas. The surrounding forests contain rich, high-altitude flora including rare wildflowers and ferns, such as Persistent Trillium, which grows near Rhododendron. Nearby boulderfields by Blood Mountain include Dutchman's breeches, squirrel corn, waterleaf and other herbaceous plants.

The area is populated with white-tailed deer, grouse and raccoon. The deer population, which was extirpated by 1895, has rebounded since re-introduction by park ranger Arthur Woody during the 1930s. Over 100 species of birds inhabit or migrate through the area, including native songbirds such as the Canada warbler, Blackburnian, black-throated blue, black-throated green and chestnut-sided warblers. Also found are hawks, owls, woodpeckers, kinglets, thrushes, vireos, cuckoos, phoebes, chickadees, titmice, nuthatches, brown creepers, wrens, tanagers, grosbeaks, indigo buntings and red crossbills. Migratory species are present during the late spring and early fall, making the area popular among birdwatchers. The creeks surrounding the lake are rich with species of salamanders.

== Vogel Museum ==
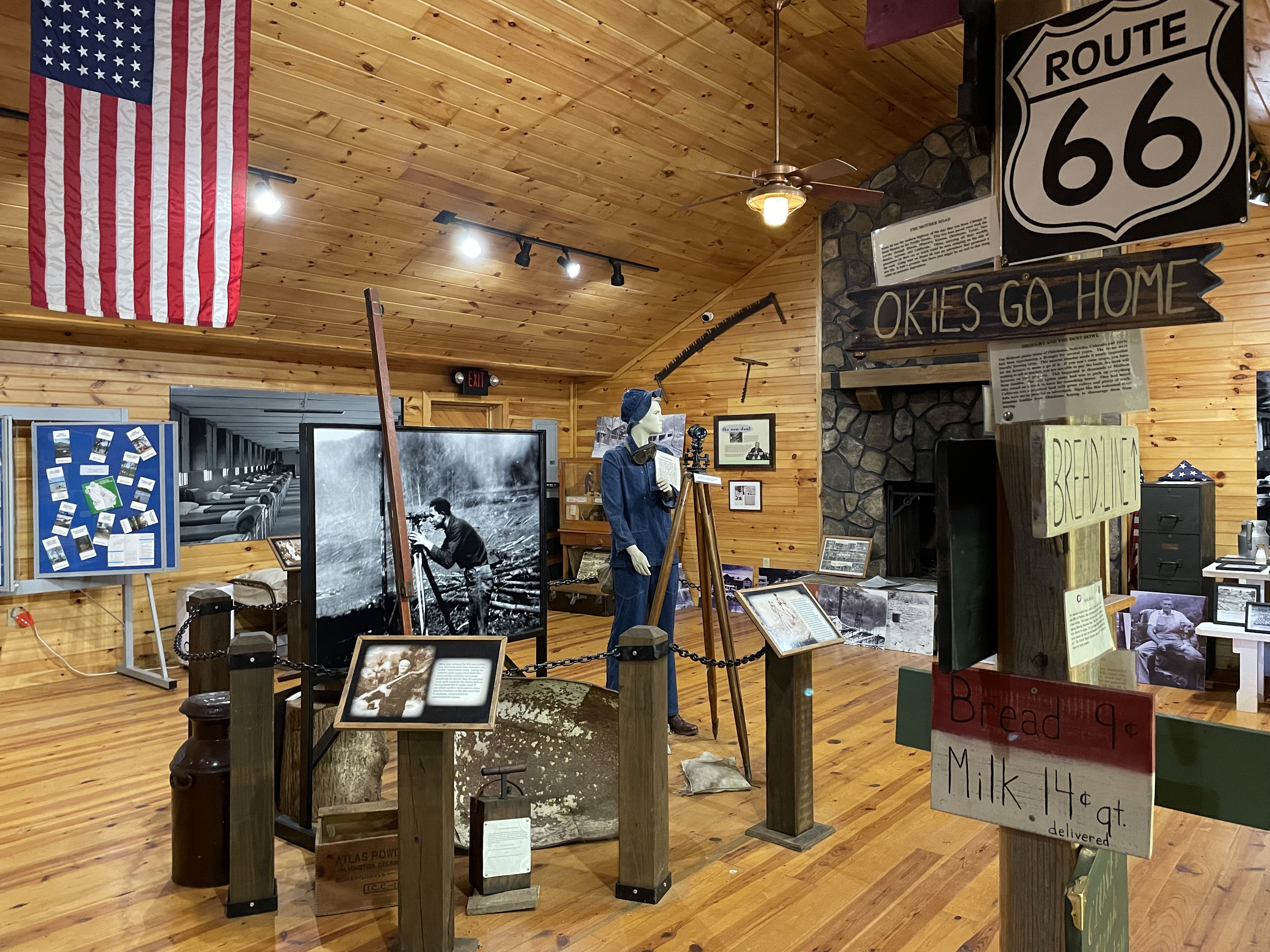
The Vogel Museum

The park's Vogel Museum features exhibits, documents, photographs and memorabilia about the activities of the Civilian Conservation Corps in Vogel State Park and other parks in Georgia.

== See also ==
Indian Springs State Park
