= Lake Trahlyta =

Lake in Georgia, United States

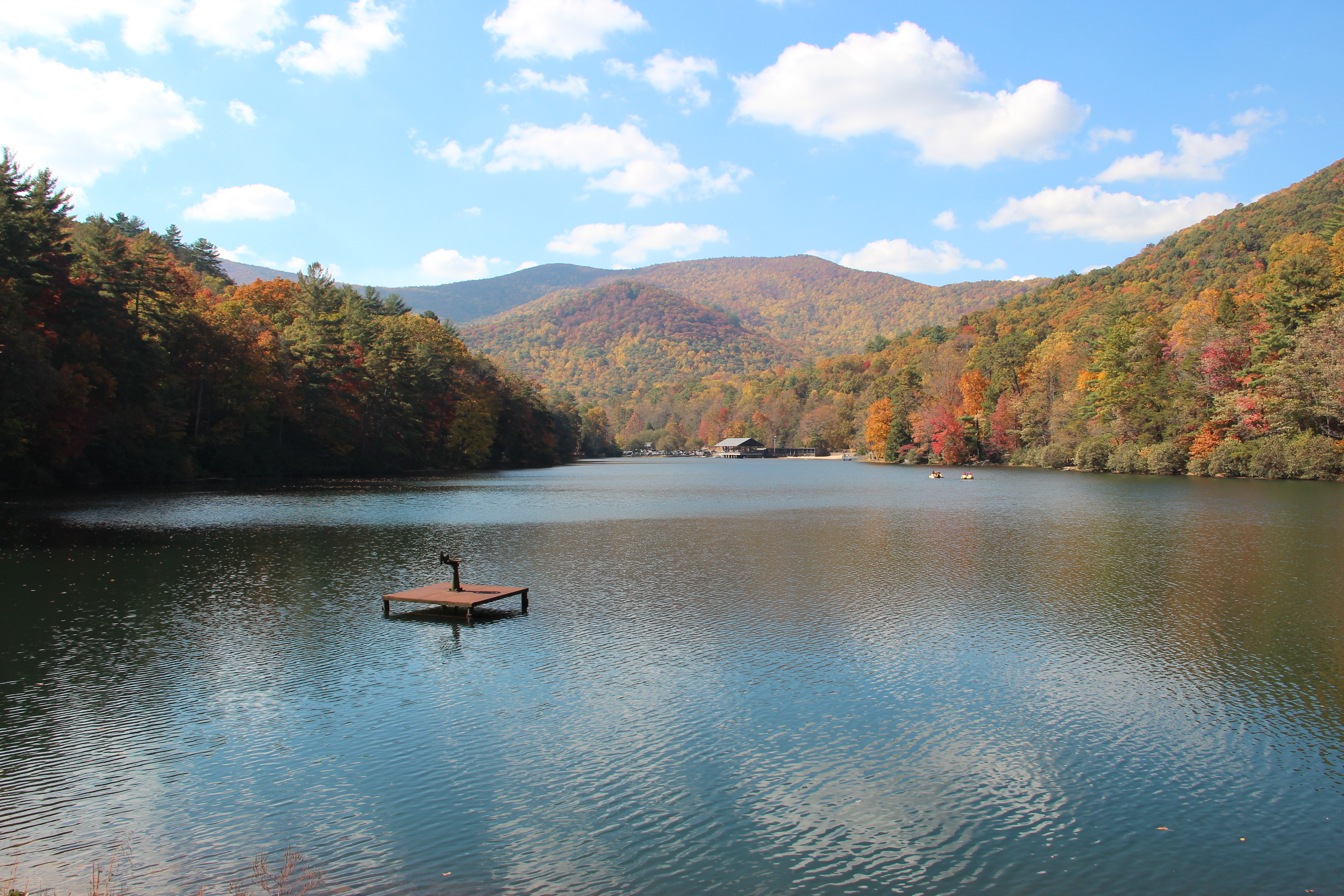

- Location within Georgia Location within the United States
- Location: Union County, Georgia
- Coordinates: 34°46′11″N 083°55′01″W
- Basin countries: United States
- Surface elevation: 2,238 ft (682 m)

Lake Trahlyta is a reservoir in Union County, Georgia. The lake is located in Vogel State Park near Blairsville, Georgia which is one of the first two original state parks in the state of Georgia.

The lake is named for Princess Trahlyta of the Eastern Band of Cherokees.

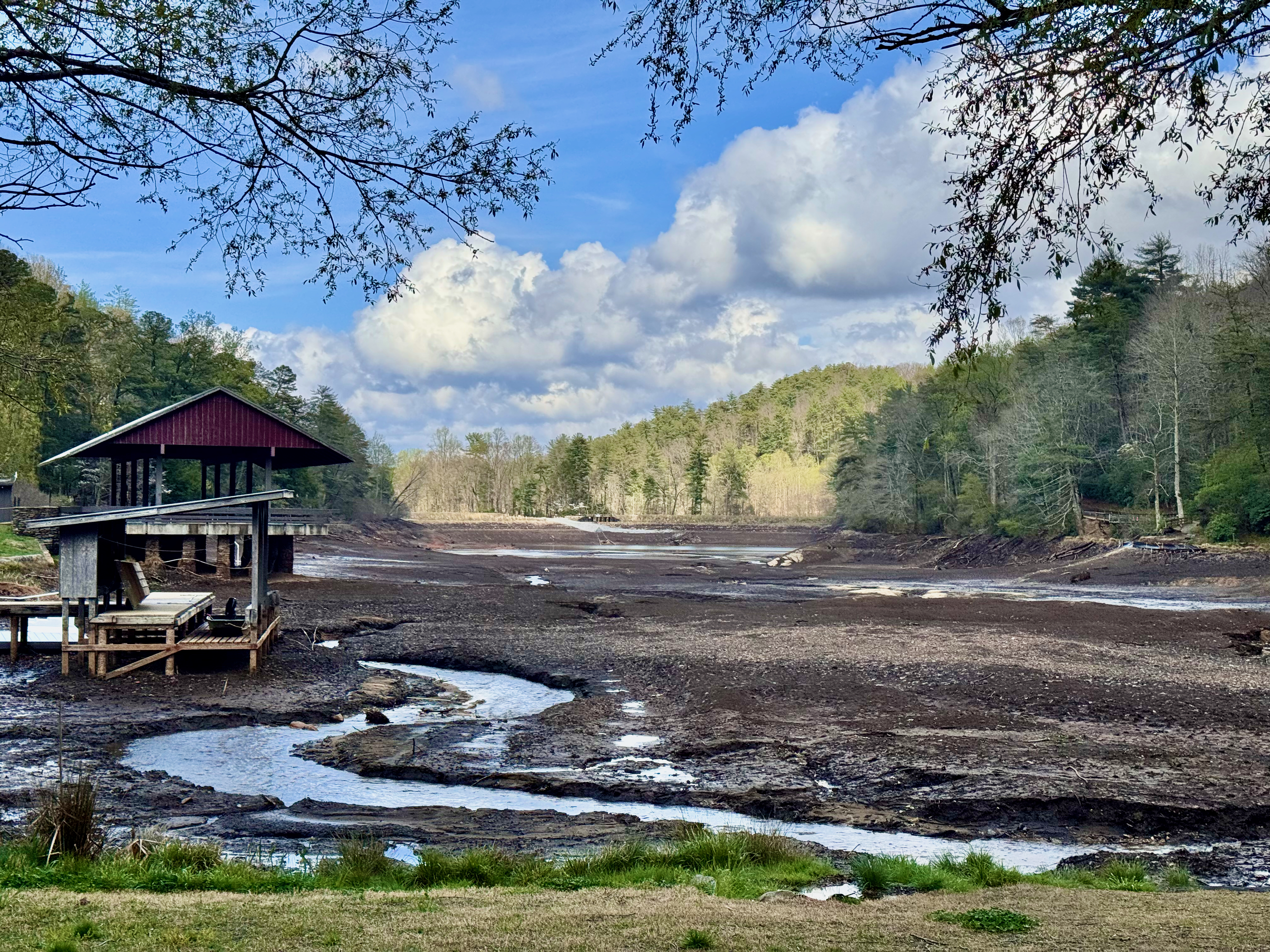
Lake Trahlyta in 2026 while it was drained for dam repairs

The 26-foot (7.9 m) deep reservoir was created by the construction of the Vogel State Park Lake Dam or Lake Trahlyta Dam in the 1930s. The 600-foot (180 m) long earthen embankment is 52-foot (16 m) tall. Lake Trahlyta was drained in early 2026 for repairs to the dam. The lake was previously drained in 1981 when the dam was heightened and it was drained again in 1994.

The dam's spillway forms the 60-foot (18 m) tall Trahlyta Falls waterfall.
