= Blood Mountain Wilderness =

Wilderness area in Georgia, United States

- IUCN category Ib (wilderness area)
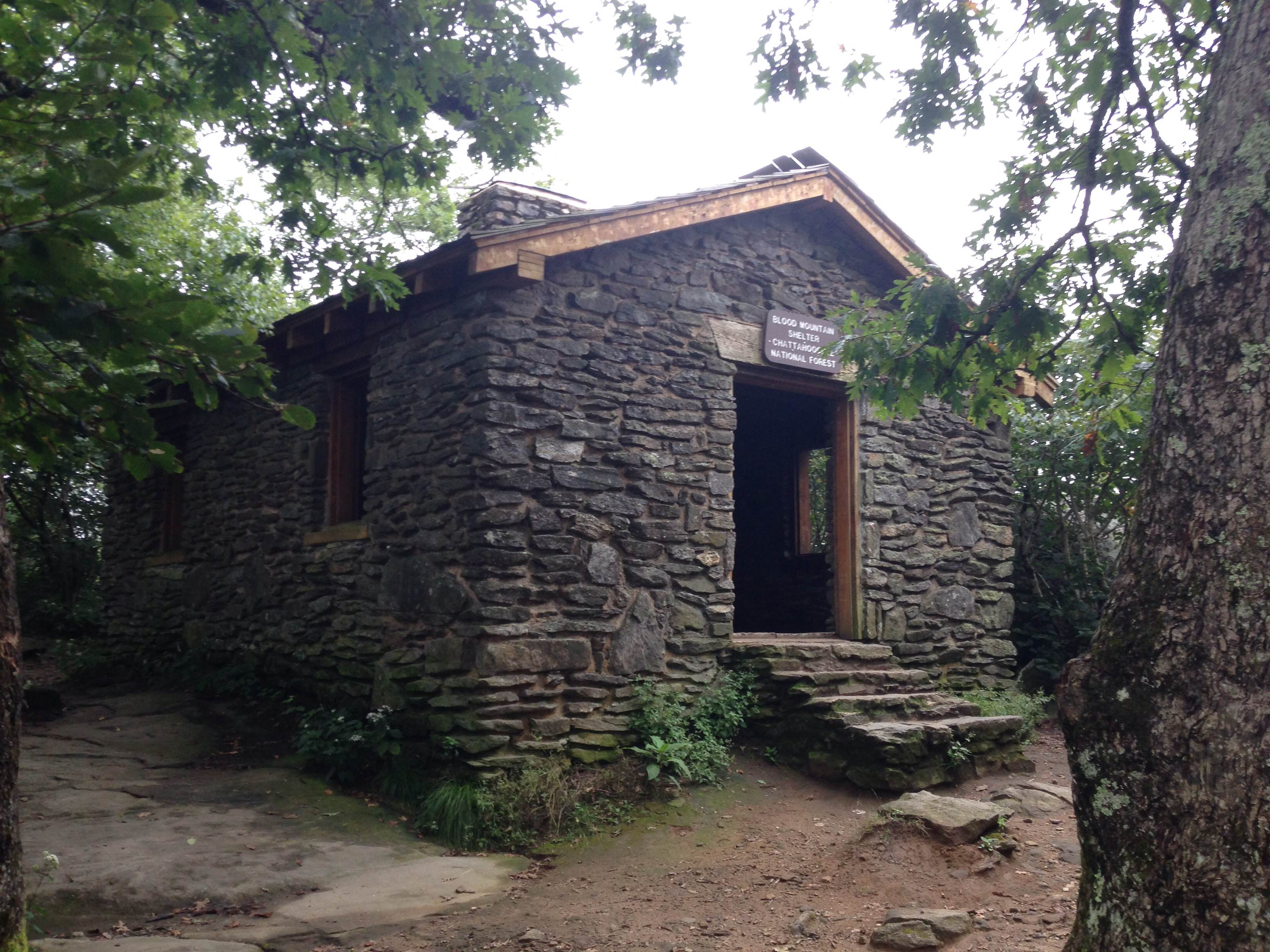
- The historic Blood Mountain Trail Shelter is in the Wilderness Area.

- Location within the United States
- Location: Lumpkin / Union counties, Georgia, USA
- Nearest city: Blairsville, Georgia
- Coordinates: 34°44′38″N 83°56′21″W
- Area: 7,800 acres (32 km^{2})
- Established: 1991
- Governing body: United States Forest Service

The Blood Mountain Wilderness was designated in 1991 and currently consists of 7,800 acres (32 km^{2}). The Wilderness is located within the borders of the Chattahoochee National Forest in Lumpkin County and Union County, Georgia. The Wilderness is managed by the United States Forest Service and is part of the National Wilderness Preservation System. In November, 1999, three fires burned through parts of the Blood Mountain Wilderness and the Chattahoochee National Forest. Fire crews came from across the nation to help fight the fires.

The highest elevation in the Blood Mountain Wilderness is the 4,458-foot (1,359 m) peak of Blood Mountain. The Wilderness includes 10.75 miles (17.30 km) of the Appalachian Trail, which may be the most heavily used portion of the AT. The Blood Mountain Wilderness is the first wilderness encountered on the AT after its starting point on Springer Mountain.

Due to conflicts with black bears, in 2012 the Forest Service implemented a seasonal requirement for all overnight campers to carry bear-resistant canisters. The requirement goes into effect every year, from March 1 to June 1, and it encompasses all areas within quarter mile of the AT, from Jarrard Gap to Neels Gap.
