= Gary Hilton =

American serial killer (born 1946)

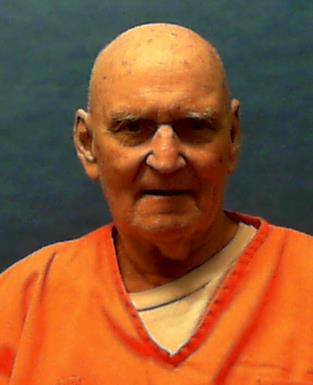
- Florida Department of Corrections mugshot
- Born: Gary Michael Hilton; November 22, 1946 (age 79); Atlanta, Georgia, U.S.
- Other names: The National Forest Serial Killer, The Beast of Blood Mountain
- Convictions: Federal; First degree murder (2 counts); Kidnapping; Robbery; Use of a firearm during a crime of violence Florida; First degree murder Kidnapping; Grand theft Georgia; Murder; North Carolina; Murder
- Penalty: Federal; Life imprisonment Florida; Death; Georgia; Life imprisonment North Carolina; Life imprisonment

Details
- Victims: 4+
- Span of crimes: October 21, 2007 – January 4, 2008 (confirmed)
- Country: United States
- States: North Carolina, Florida, Georgia (possibly South Carolina)
- Date apprehended: January 5, 2008
- Imprisoned at: Union Correctional Institution, Raiford, Florida

Gary Michael Hilton (born November 22, 1946), known as The National Forest Serial Killer, is an American serial killer responsible for four known homicides between 2007 and 2008 committed in three states, all of which occurred within the premises of national forests. Sentenced to death in Florida and to life imprisonment in Georgia and North Carolina, Hilton remains a suspect in several other killings, including that of Judy Smith.

== Murders ==
=== John and Irene Bryant ===
On October 21, 2007, a retired couple and avid hikers living in Horse Shoe, North Carolina, John Davis “Jack” Bryant, 80, and Irene Woods Bryant, 84, left for a hike through Pisgah National Forest, leaving their parked maroon Ford Escape at the Yellow Gap Road near U.S. Route 276. After not hearing from them for two weeks, family members reported the couple as missing to the Henderson County Sheriff's Office, who promptly launched a search for the Bryants, consisting of more than thirty volunteers, cadaver dogs, and a helicopter. Through examining their phone records, it was learned that John had attempted to call 911 on the day of their disappearance, but the signal was lost, and the call was dropped.

On November 10, 2007, the search party located the body of a woman on the Barnett Branch trail, covered with leaves. Suspecting that it might belong to Irene, they sent it to the state medical examiner's office in Chapel Hill to perform an autopsy. Three days later, the body was positively identified as that of Irene, who had been bludgeoned to death with a blunt instrument. As this was now considered a homicide perpetrated on federal land, the FBI launched an investigation with a reward of $10,000 to whoever could provide information leading to the killer. Simultaneously, it was revealed that a bank card belonging to the Bryants had been used to withdraw $300 from an ATM in Ducktown, Tennessee, with the surveillance cameras showing an older Caucasian man wearing a yellow rainjacket whose hood was obscuring his face. By this time, John was still considered a missing person, possibly abducted by whoever had killed his wife.

On February 3, 2008, Mark Waldrop, a hunter, discovered a skull in the Nantahala National Forest, just off the forest service road known as "The Switchbacks." After calling the local deputy for assistance, the duo investigated the scene. Upon closer inspection, a pelvis and spine were located about 20 yards from the skull. Since there was no clothing or identification near the remains, the bones were sent to the medical examiner in Chapel Hill to identify the decedent. After two days, it was positively identified as that of John Bryant.

=== Cheryl Dunlap ===
On December 3, 2007, 46-year-old Cheryl Hodges Dunlap, a resident of Crawfordville, Florida, did not appear at her church in Tallahassee, where she taught Sunday school. Considering this behavior to be unusual, her family reported her missing on the following day, after her abandoned car, a white Toyota Camry, was located north of the county line. Approximately five days later, a search party of around 180 people was organized to help locate her, and despite initially being unable to find anything, the members still hoped that they would locate Dunlap alive.

On December 16, 2007, Ronnie Rentz, a hunter passing through the woods in the Apalachicola National Forest with his dogs, discovered the decapitated, decomposing body of a white woman, immediately reporting the finding to the state authorities. As they were initially unsure whether the body was Dunlap's, it was sent to the medical examiner, who confirmed that it was indeed hers via DNA profiling. Classifying her death as a homicide, authorities announced that they were looking for a suspicious green truck seen in the area around the time Dunlap disappeared, driven by a man who had used her ATM card five times in Tallahassee, withdrawing $700 from her account.

Over the next few days, numerous tips were submitted to the police, some of which were about a strange homeless man with a dog who was driving a green 2001 Chevrolet Astro van, but this tip did not lead to an arrest. Around this time, rumors began circulating that a serial offender was operating between Georgia and Florida. Still, at the time, the Leon County Sheriff's Office stated that they were investigating the case as an isolated homicide.

In an April 2025 episode with Interview with a Killer host David Scott, Hilton admitted to killing Dunlap. Hilton stated he told her he was going to be letting her go free, he then shot her in the back of the head.

=== Meredith Emerson ===
On New Year's Day of 2008, 24-year-old sales manager Meredith Hope Emerson decided to go for a hike along the Freeman Trail on Blood Mountain, in Georgia's Vogel State Park. She was accompanied by her black Labrador Retriever, Ella, and according to several witnesses, they had observed a mysterious older man with his dog following her. On January 3, 2008, authorities located her 1995 Chevrolet Cavalier, where they found various items such as her water bottle, a dog leash, and a police baton.

That day, further investigation into the man seen following Emerson revealed that he was 61-year-old Hilton, a local drifter known for his strange behavior and vicious temper. He often walked his Golden Retriever, Dandy, along the trail. Since this revelation, he was announced as a person of interest in the case, with police requesting that they officially interrogate him about the case. A day after this announcement, Emerson's dog Ella was found wandering at a Kroger parking lot and safely returned to Emerson's family. On January 5, 2008, authorities located numerous items belonging to Emerson inside a dumpster near a QuikTrip parking lot in Cumming: her bloodied clothing, wallet, driver's license, a University of Georgia ID card and a bloodstained car seat belt.

== Suspected victims ==
1 DoubleTree Hilton, Center City, Philadelphia where Judy Smith was staying and disappeared from.
2 September 7, 1997 - Stoney Fork, Chestnut Creek, Asheville, North Carolina where skeletal remains where found of decedent with arthritic knee.

In addition to the homicides mentioned above, Hilton has been investigated and remains a suspect in the following unsolved murders:

- On September 7, 1997, several human bones and personal items were found in Pisgah National Forest, scattered near a campground. The decedent was eventually identified as 51-year-old hiker Judy Smith, who was last seen in Philadelphia five months earlier on April 10, 1997. It has been speculated that she might have been a victim of Hilton, who had left one of his victims in a similar condition near where Smith's body was discovered.
- 20-year-old Jason Andrew Knapp, a Clemson University student, was last seen by his roommate at their residence in University Terrace Apartments in South Carolina on April 11, 1998. His roommate said that Knapp was watching a movie at approximately 10:30 p.m. that evening. Authorities found Knapp's white 1990 Chevrolet Beretta abandoned nine days later on April 21, 1998. The vehicle was parked at Table Rock State Park, in Pickens County, South Carolina. He was declared legally dead in 2018. Due to similarities to his other known crimes, Hilton was proposed as a suspect but he denied any connection to Knapp.
- Hairdresser Patrice Marie Tamber Endres, 38, disappeared from her hair salon, Tamber's Trim ‘N Tan, in Cumming, Georgia, on April 15, 2004, between 11:37 and 11:50 a.m. Her remains were found on December 6, 2005, in Dawson County, Georgia. Hilton was known to have been in Forsyth County, because he had been stopped for a traffic violation there. In his statements to investigators, Hilton told them that he would usually go to hair salons to ask for money, usually around lunchtime. Investigators were unable to find an alibi for him on the day of Patrice's disappearance.
- 26-year-old Rossana Miliani, a hiker from Miami, Florida, was last seen on December 7, 2005, at approximately 12:00 p.m. at the Ramada Inn hotel in Cherokee, North Carolina. Miliani called her father from the hotel that day and told him she was going hiking on the Appalachian Trail. A store clerk who read about Miliani's disappearance claimed she sold a backpack to Miliani and an unidentified white man in his 60s in Bryson City, North Carolina, on December 13, 2005. Following Hilton's arrest, the store clerk contacted authorities to note the similarities between Hilton and the suspect.
- Michael Scot Louis, 27, a South Daytona resident, went missing on November 21, 2007. A few weeks later on December 6, his dismembered remains were found by a fisherman in Ormond Beach, packed in black bags which had been dumped in the Tomoka River. The remains were not immediately connected to Louis, with identification occurring several days later by a lab in California. His head was never located. Authorities have stated that while Hilton remains a suspect in the murder and was in the area at the time, he is not the only suspect.

== Arrest, trials and imprisonment ==
Five hours after police found the items linked to Emerson, Hilton was arrested thanks to two anonymous phone tips, which claimed that he was vacuuming his van at a local establishment. He was transferred to the county jail, where he was subsequently charged with kidnapping based on the material evidence connecting him to the case. While he was being held at a federal prison in Atlanta, the search for Emerson's body continued in a 90-square mile area of the Chattahoochee National Forest. Upon examining his van, the same 2001 Chevrolet Astro as reported earlier in tips by witnesses, authorities noticed that it was missing its rear car seat belt, which matched the one located among Emerson's personal items.

In exchange for dropping the death penalty against him and assuring his dog Dandy would be safely placed in a new home, Hilton agreed to reveal where he had disposed of Emerson's remains, leading the investigators to the Dawson Forest Management Area. She had been decapitated, but the coroner determined that it had been done post-mortem in an attempt to prevent identification. Hilton claimed that he had abducted her to steal her bank cards and PIN code and that he had repeatedly hit her with a tire iron, causing her death. He later pleaded guilty to her murder and was sentenced to life imprisonment with the possibility of parole after 30 years. In September 2009, a hiker found camping supplies believed to belong to Hilton, which were then turned over to the Florida authorities for use in the upcoming Dunlap trial.

About a month later, Florida prosecutors charged Hilton with Dunlap's murder, claiming that forensic evidence linked him to the slaying. Despite his efforts to fight his extradition, Hilton was brought to Leon County from the Georgia Diagnostic and Classification State Prison in June 2008, and was remanded to await trial for the Dunlap killing. Attorneys Ines Suber and Steven Been, who specialized in capital murder cases, were hired as his public defenders. At his trial, prosecutors claimed that Hilton had abducted Dunlap from the Leon Sinks Geological Area and held her captive for two days, before eventually killing her and decapitating her body. He had also attempted to eliminate potential evidence by incinerating her head and hands in a fire pit before finally dumping the body in the forest.

Hilton's defense team claimed that there was no forensic evidence that he had committed the murder, while the prosecutors countered that Hilton had claimed on tape that he had disposed of Dunlap's body, but then deliberately tried to distance himself from it. After four hours of deliberation, the jury found him guilty on three out of four charges, with a recommendation to impose the death penalty. On February 22, 2011, he was sentenced to death. In 2012, Hilton was brought to trial for the third time for the murders of John and Irene Bryant. As part of another plea deal with the prosecutor, he admitted his guilt in the killings and was sentenced to an additional life term without the chance of parole. During the hearings, Hilton described how he had killed Irene on the spot and then kidnapped John to extort his bank details, before shooting him in the head with a .22 Magnum and then dumping his body.

== Aftermath ==
During and after his trials, criminal profilers from the FBI and agencies from across the country attended the proceedings to interview Hilton. According to criminologist Eric Hickey, Hilton was likely responsible for other homicides before 2007, a claim supported by other veteran profilers, who were skeptical that Hilton had begun killing in his 60s. In 2018, Hilton unsuccessfully attempted to overturn his death sentence, citing his defense team as dysfunctional and ineffective. Both state and federal authorities denied his appeal. Hilton's golden retriever, Dandy, was found a new home following his conviction for Emerson's murder, in accordance to the plea agreement.

== See also ==
- List of death row inmates in the United States
- List of serial killers in the United States

== Bibliography ==
- Fred Rosen (2011). Trails of Death: The True Story of National Forest Serial Killer Gary Hilton. Titletown Publishing. ISBN 978-0982720691.
- Lee Butcher (October 24, 2011). At the Hands of a Stranger. Pinnacle Books. ISBN 978-0786030460.
- Gloria Tucker (October 30, 2019). Victimized By A Serial Killer. Lulu Publishing Services. ISBN 9781684712069.
