= Blood Mountain =

Mountain in Georgia, United States

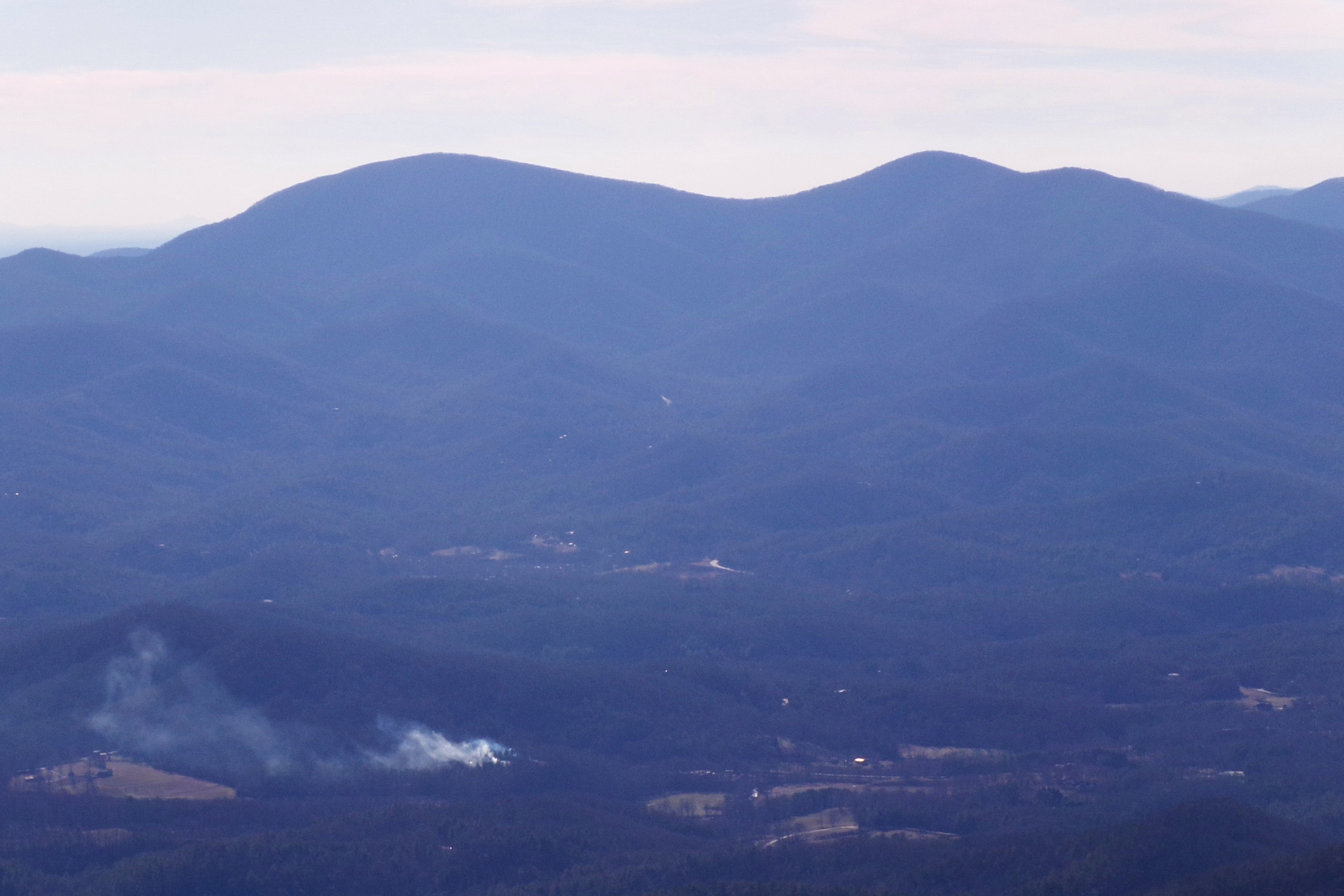
- Blood Mountain (L) and Slaughter Mountain (R), as seen from Brasstown Bald

Highest point
- Elevation: 4,452 ft (1,357 m)
- Prominence: 1,480 ft (450 m)
- Listing: Mountains of Georgia
- Coordinates: 34°44′23″N 83°56′14″W

Geography
- Location within Georgia
- Location: Lumpkin / Union counties, Georgia, U.S.
- Parent range: Blue Ridge Mountains
- Topo map: USGS Neel Gap

Climbing
- First ascent: unknown
- Easiest route: Appalachian Trail, other trails

Blood Mountain is the highest peak on the Georgia section of the Appalachian Trail and the sixth-tallest mountain in Georgia, with an elevation of 4,458 feet (1,359 m). It is located on the border of Lumpkin County with Union County and is within the boundaries of the Chattahoochee National Forest and the Blood Mountain Wilderness. There are several waterfalls, hiking trails and other recreational areas in the vicinity. This mountain marks the southernmost range limit for many Northern and Appalachian species, especially for plant species.

Blood Mountain is the high point of the Apalachicola River watershed via the Chattahoochee River. On clear days, it is possible to see the skyline of Atlanta from the peak, 116 km (72 mi) away.

== History ==
There are various theories on the origin of the mountain's name. Some believe that the name of the mountain comes from a bloody battle between the Cherokee and Muscogee Native Americans. Some people believe that it got its name from the reddish color of the lichen and Catawba rhododendron growing near the summit.

== Hiking and recreation ==
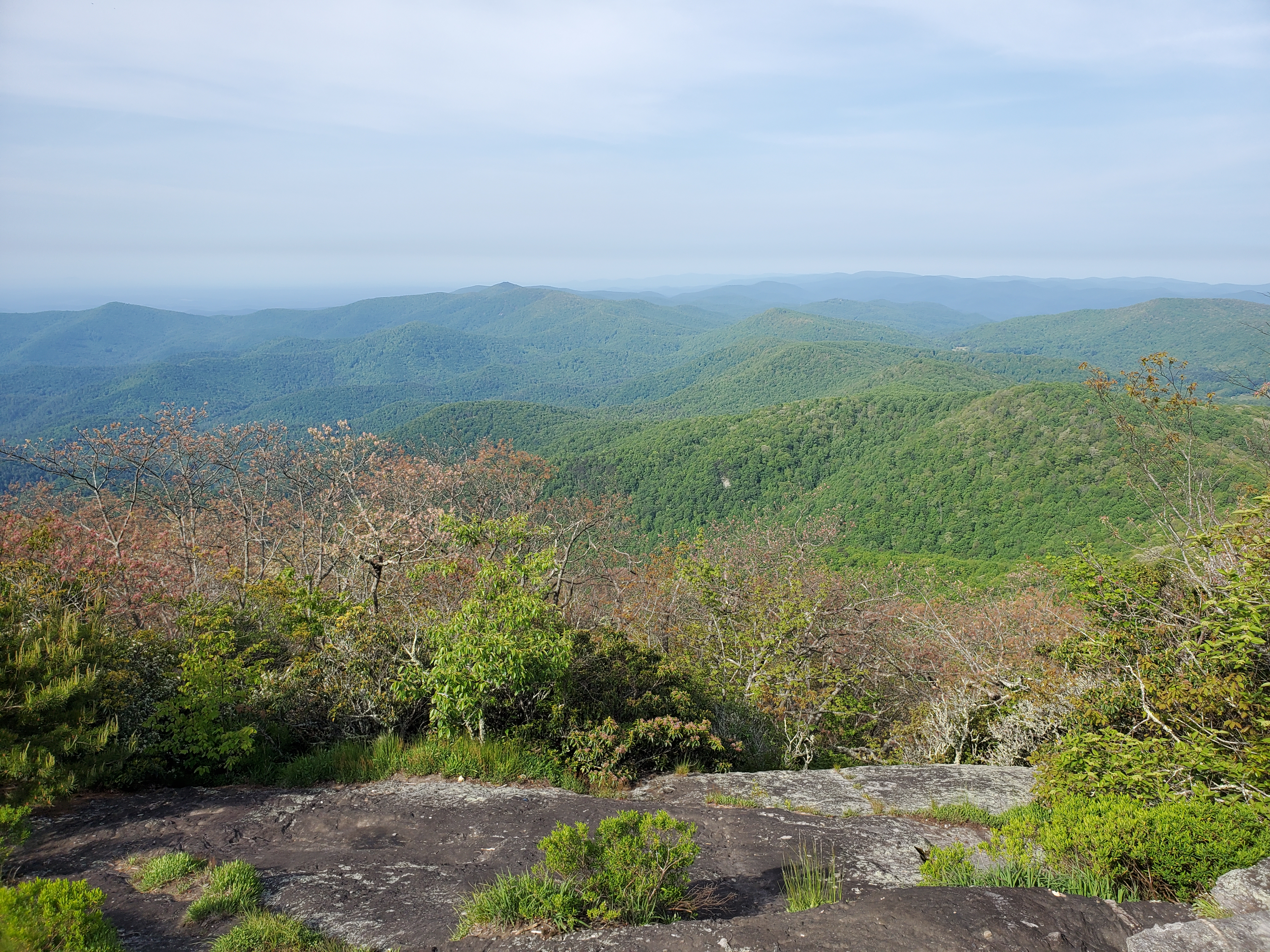
View from near the summit of Blood Mountain

This peak has scenic views from the large rock formations that top the mountain. There is a hiker's shelter at the top of the mountain maintained by the Georgia Appalachian Trail Club, and at the bottom of the eastern side of the mountain is a hostel and store (at Neel Gap, where the Appalachian Trail intersects U.S. Highway 19/129) at the Walasi-Yi Interpretive Center. The summit shelter is a two-room stone cabin which was built by the Civilian Conservation Corps in 1934 and was listed on the National Register of Historic Places in January 2013. The Walasi-Yi Center started out as log cabin constructed in the early 20th century by a logging company. It was renovated and expanded by the Civilian Conservation Corps in 1933-38 into a larger stone building. The Center now houses a store; its breezeway is the only place the Appalachian Trail passes through a man-made structure.

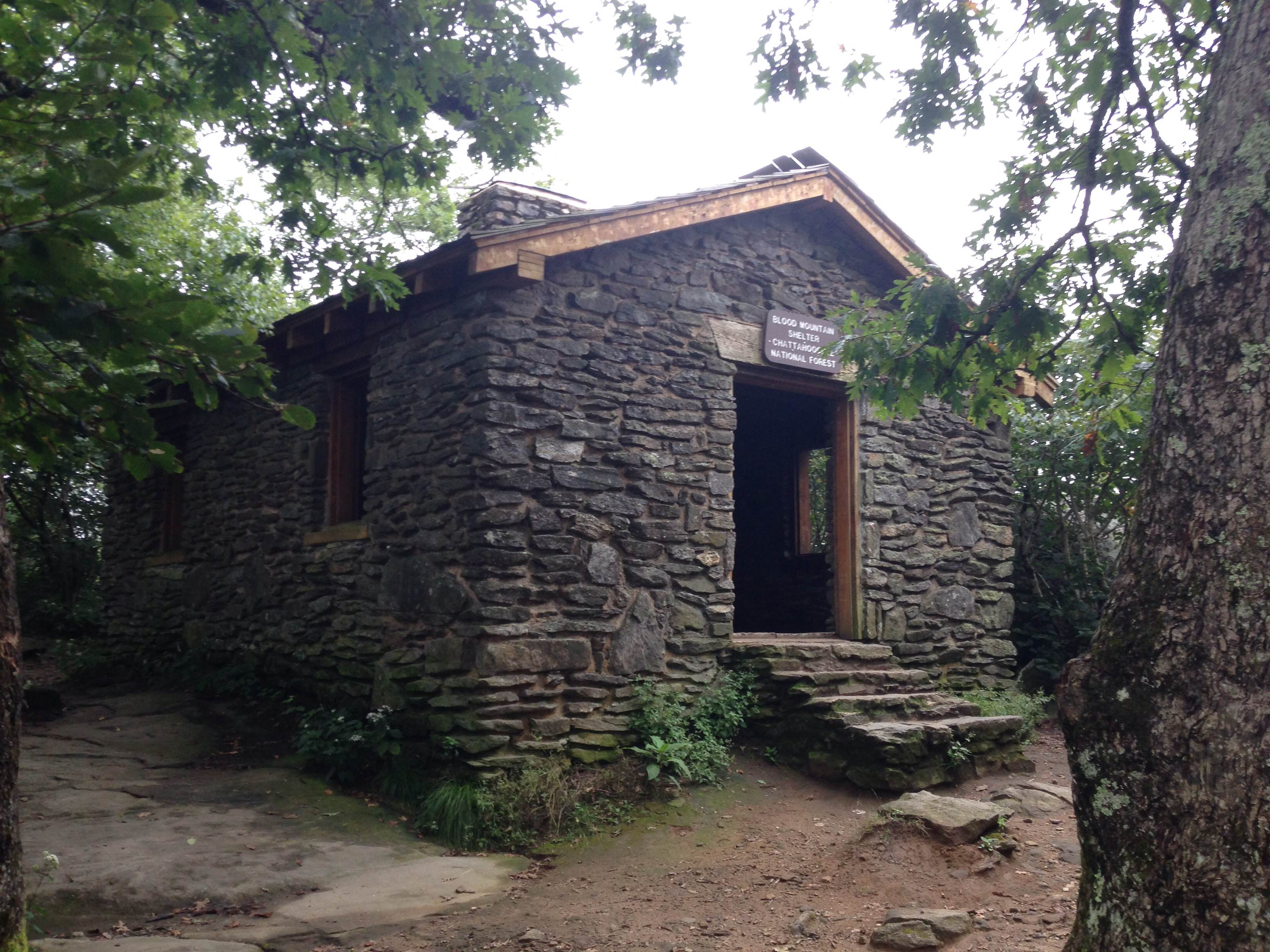
Civilian Conservation Corps trail shelter

There is a short (2 mile) but steep (1,800 foot elevation gain) approach trail to the top of the mountain from a parking area to the immediate north of the Walasi-Yi Center. This hike includes views as walkers approach the summit, and the final 1.5 miles (2.4 km), past the Flatrock Gap intersection with the Byron Reece Trail, has a number of switchbacks. It is perhaps the most hiked segment of the Appalachian Trail in Georgia. Another approach is from the other side at Lake Winfield Scott via the Slaughter Creek Trail. This approach, which is easier to hike, has campsites and a number of sources of treatable water.

Adjacent to the mountain are several boulder fields and stands of northern hardwoods and large buckeyes. Portions of the area were previously logged and now sport fast-growing tulip poplar.

Near Blood Mountain are DeSoto Falls Scenic Recreation Area and campground, Vogel State Park and Sosebee Cove Scenic Area. All are accessible from Blood Mountain by trail and road.

== Murder of Meredith Emerson ==
On New Year's Day of 2008, Meredith Emerson went missing from a hike along the Freeman Trail on Blood Mountain. Gary Hilton was arrested, and revealed where he had disposed of Emerson's remains in a deal with authorities.

== Gallery ==
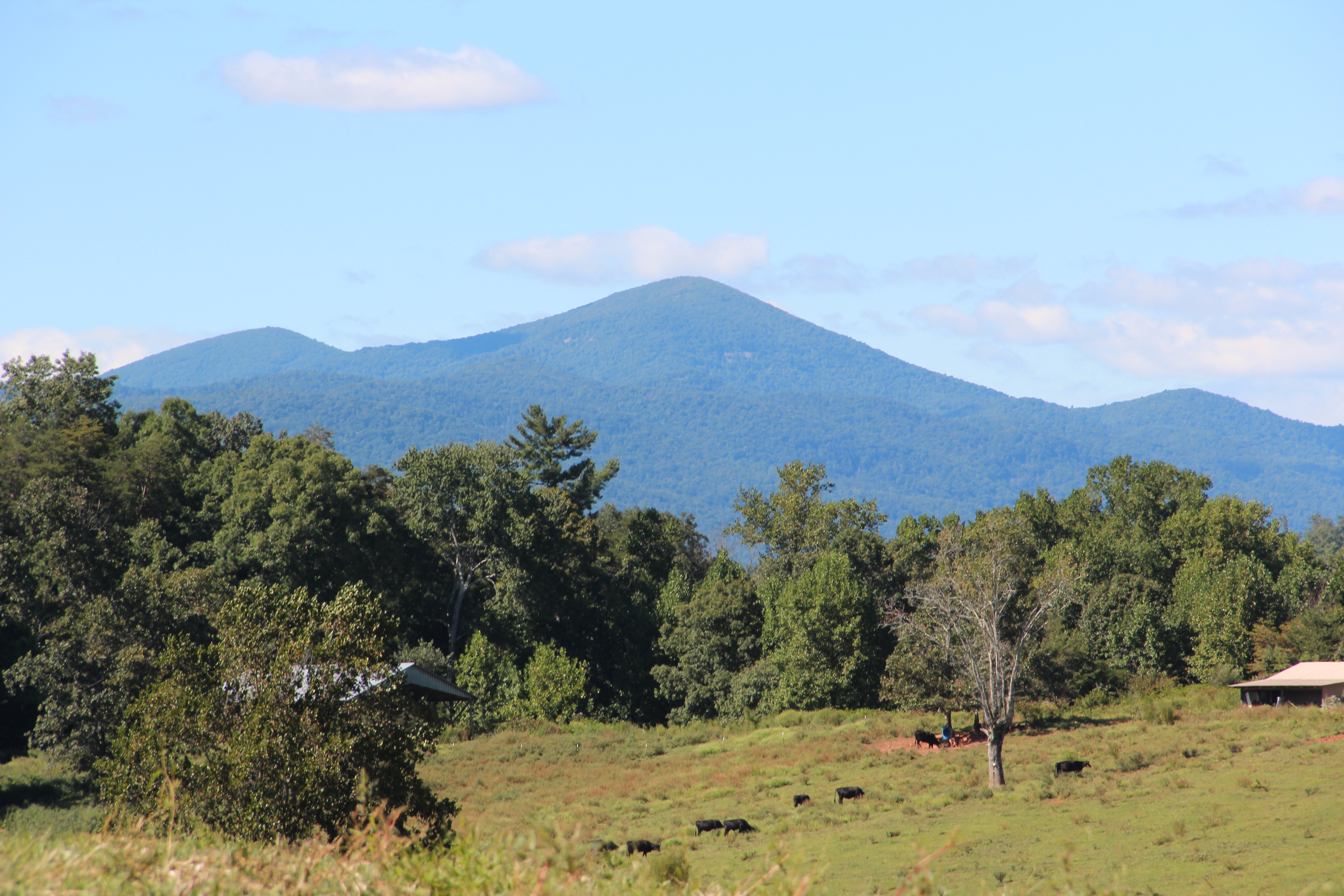
Viewed from the Three Sisters Vineyards

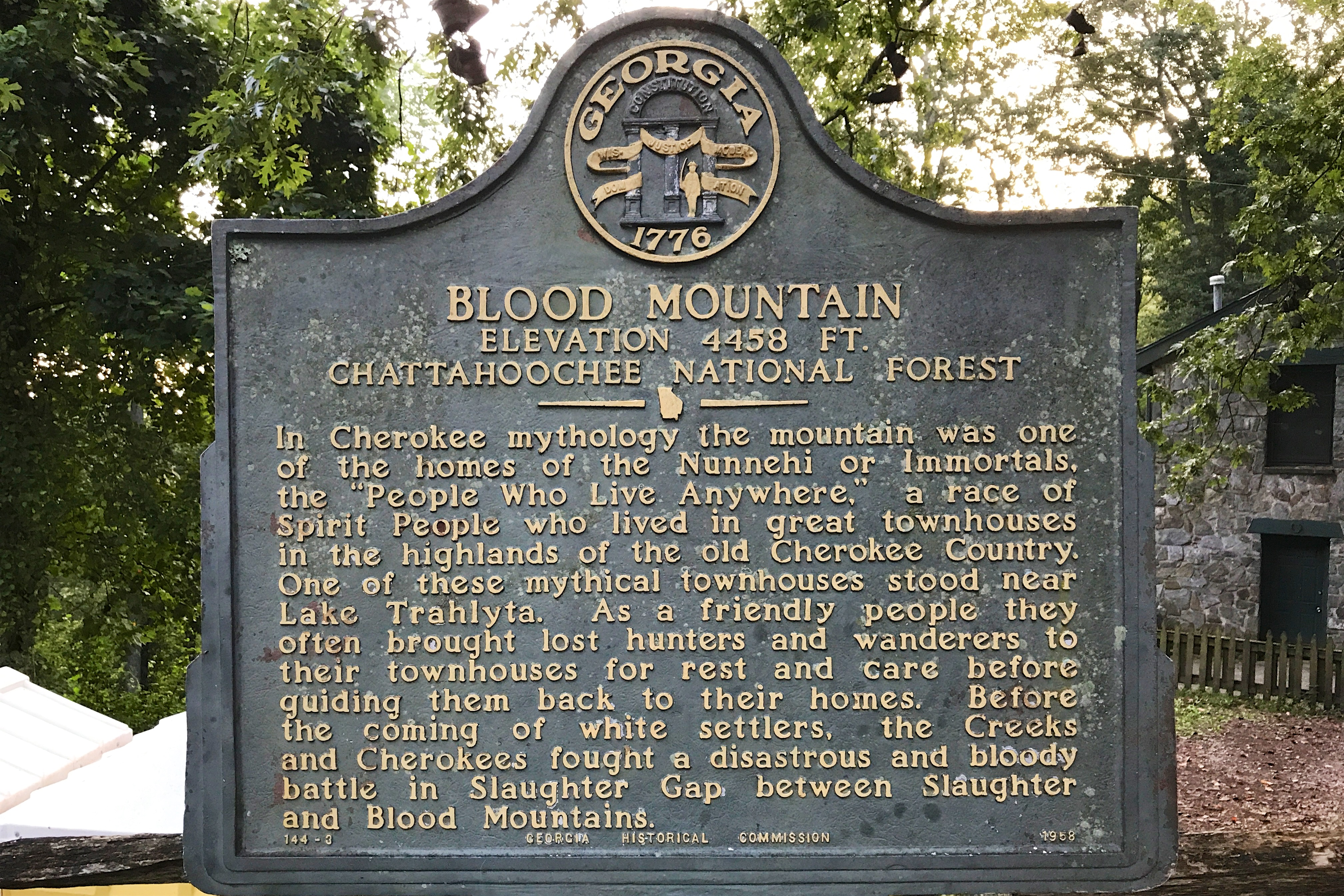
Blood mountain historical marker

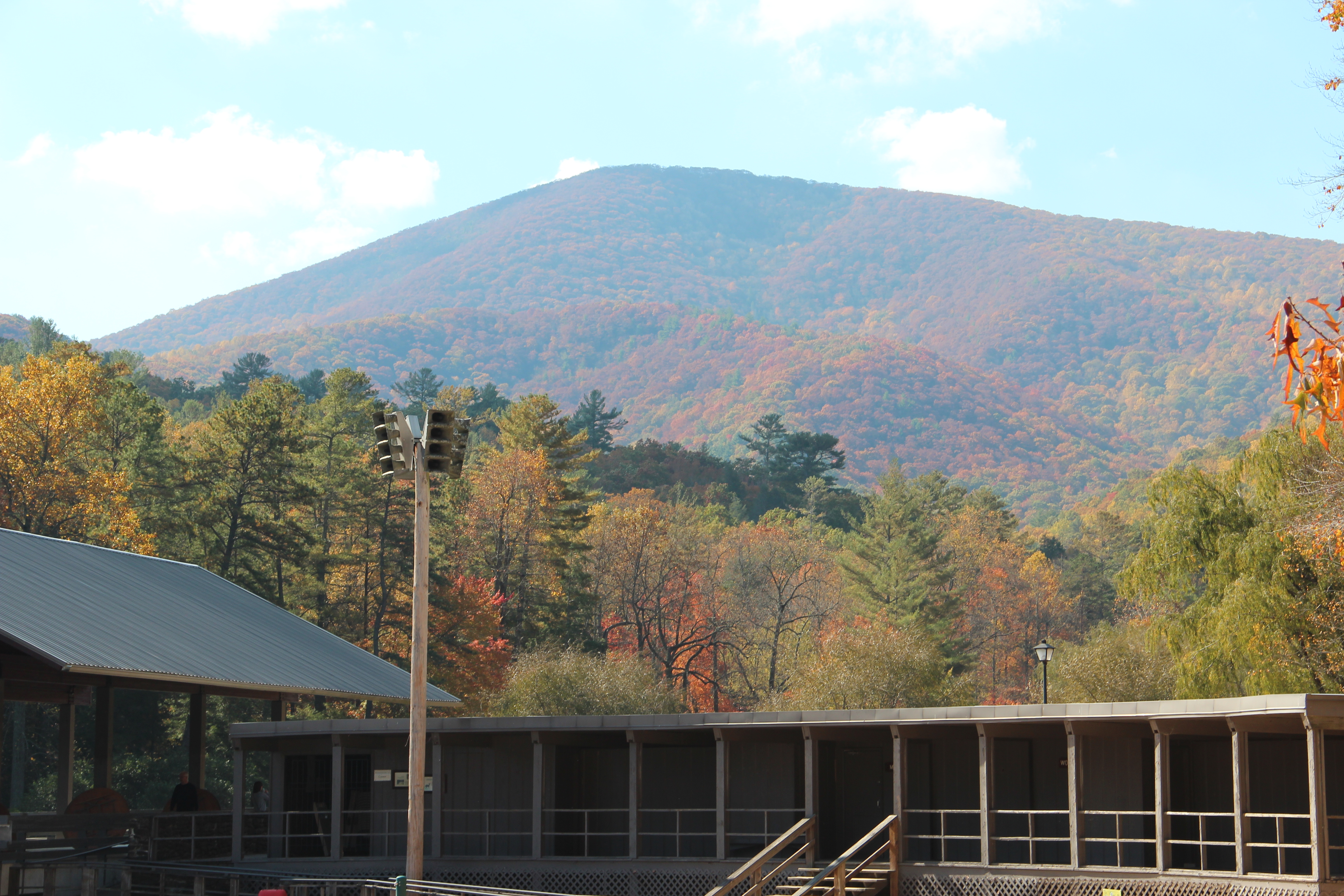
Blood Mountain viewed from Vogel State Park
