= Killing of Judy Smith =

1997 murder case in North Carolina

Judy Smith homicide
- Picture of Judy Smith and her red backpack distributed after her disappearance
- Date: Between April 10, 1997-September 7, 1997
- Location: Unknown where homicide took place April 10, 1997 - Center City, Philadelphia September 7, 1997 Remains possibly near Asheville, North Carolina, US
- Motive: Unknown
- Perpetrator: Unidentified
- Burial: Cremated
- Arrests: 0
- Convicted: 0
- Charges: 0

On September 7, 1997, hunters in North Carolina's Pisgah National Forest found human bones, clothing, and some other items scattered in the woods near a campground. The remains, most of which were around a shallow grave, were identified as belonging to a woman between the ages of 40 and 55 with a seriously arthritic knee. Due to holes and cuts on her bra, and similar cutting marks on the bones, investigators ruled that the unidentified decedent had been stabbed to death.

Dental records and the arthritic knee soon led the body to be identified as that of Judy Smith (born Judith Eldredge; December 15, 1946, in Hyannis, Massachusetts), a 50-year-old nurse from Newton, Massachusetts, who had last been positively seen alive by her husband Jeffrey at a hotel in Philadelphia almost five months earlier. When she had not shown up after a day purportedly spent sightseeing in the city, he had reported her missing. Until the bones were found, the search for her had been concentrated in the Philadelphia area, where several sightings had been reported, although some of them may have been of a homeless woman who strongly resembled Smith.

The investigation into the killing has been complicated by the unresolved question of how Smith got to North Carolina from Philadelphia, 600 miles (970 km) away, in the first place. She and her husband planned to stay in the Philadelphia area and visit friends after the conference he was attending ended; she had not expressed any desire to visit the Asheville area where her body was found. Yet when found she was wearing clothes more appropriate for hiking than those she had on when last seen in Philadelphia. It has been speculated that she might have been a victim of serial killer Gary Michael Hilton, who had left one of his victims in a similar condition near where Smith's body was discovered.

Philadelphia police initially considered Jeffrey Smith a suspect, casting doubt on the idea that his wife had even been to the city in the first place. However, his involvement was ruled out due to severe health problems making it unlikely that he could have disposed of her body where it was found. Jeffrey died in 2005. The Philadelphia police, the FBI, and the Buncombe County sheriff's office continue to investigate; the case has been the subject of a segment on Unsolved Mysteries.

== Background ==
Judy Bradford (her name from her second marriage), a home care nurse in the Boston area, met Jeffrey Smith, a lawyer, when she cared for Smith's father for a week following the latter's throat surgery in the mid-1980s. Jeffrey later recalled Judy's devotion to his father's care, and how she used a window curtain rod in the absence of a proper holder for his father's IV bag. Jeffrey, a divorcé with a grown daughter, began dating Judy, who also had two adult children from a previous marriage, and in September 1996, the two wed.

Jeffrey's work as a lawyer was also related to health care; he represented the Northeast Pharmaceutical Conference, an organization of researchers and executives primarily from New England. Eight months after their marriage, the couple planned their first trip together, attending a conference in Philadelphia from April 9–11, 1997. Following that, they planned to spend the rest of the week visiting friends in nearby New Jersey.

== Disappearance ==
When the couple came to Logan International Airport on April 9, 1997, to check in for their flight to Philadelphia, Judy suddenly realized that she had forgotten to bring her driver's license. New FAA regulations at the time required that airlines verify passengers' identities before allowing them to fly. Judy told her husband she would return to their home to get it and then take a later flight. That evening, she caught up to him in the lobby of the DoubleTree hotel in Center City Philadelphia where the conference was being held, apologizing for her mistake and bringing flowers.

The next morning, Jeffrey awoke before his wife and went downstairs to get breakfast. He returned to the room afterwards and found her awake, in the shower. He told her the breakfast was exceptional and that she should have it for herself. She joked in response that she should just go down as she was, at the time, naked.

Jeffrey left for the day's first session. The night before, the couple had agreed that Judy, who was making her first visit to Philadelphia, would go visit the city's tourist attractions such as Independence Hall and the Liberty Bell, and they would then reunite at the hotel at the end of the day for the conference's cocktail party at 6 p.m. When Jeffrey finished moderating the last of the day's sessions, he returned to their room. Judy was not there.

He assumed she had returned, changed, and gone down to the party ahead of him, perhaps having gotten confused about their plans. When he went downstairs to check on this, however, she was not there. After going back and forth between the party and the room several times, he grew concerned and informed a concierge, who began calling area hospitals.

Jeffrey left the cocktail party and paid a cab driver to slowly follow the route of the Philadelphia PHLASH tourist bus, which Judy had told him she was planning to use, for any sign of her. He called his stepchildren in Boston and asked one of them to go to their house and check their answering machines for any messages. None of those options yielded any useful information. Finally he went to the Philadelphia police around midnight to report Judy missing.

== Investigation ==
The Philadelphia police told Jeffrey that he could not file a missing person report until 24 hours after he had last seen Judy. He recalls that a detective said that if he wanted to "push it", he could file his report in the morning. After spending the remainder of the night sleepless in his hotel room, he did.

Before Jeffrey did file a report, however, he spoke to Philadelphia mayor Ed Rendell and John Perzel, a member of the Pennsylvania House of Representatives from the city, who were both attending the conference, about what he felt was the police's dismissive attitude to his complaint. He said later that he believed those conversations had made a difference, as when he returned to the police station to make his report, two detectives were waiting to take it and he was treated with courtesy and respect; he said he even overheard one saying on the telephone that Commissioner Richard Neal was to receive a copy of the report.

Nevertheless, Jeffrey said several months later that there was some resistance. One detective, he claimed, was still saying four days later that he thought Judy had just had a midlife crisis and had done this just for the attention; the detective later repeated that speculation, with some qualification, to The Boston Globe. Jeffrey also believed the police, while cooperative overall, seemed to be inordinately focused on him as a suspect. "When you look at the statistics, 85 to 90 percent of females [who are murdered] are killed by someone very close to them: a family member, spouse, boyfriend", police captain John McGinnis explained later. "Statistically, we have to look at Jeffrey Smith as a suspect, until it's proven that he is not a suspect".

While Jeffrey understood and cooperated when they asked to interview his stepdaughter without him present, since she told the police he "[didn't] cheat on his taxes", he was distressed that they expressed doubt that Judy had ever been in Philadelphia to begin with. If, they asked, Judy was the experienced traveler who had once gone to Thailand on her own to visit the family of a grateful patient, why had she forgotten her driver's license? Jeffrey later explained in response to the Philadelphia City Paper that the rule had only been in effect for 18 months and Judy had only flown once during that time, so it was entirely possible that she made an honest mistake.

According to police, only one other witness, a desk clerk, could corroborate him on having seen Judy at the hotel, which did not have a guest register, until another conference attendee recalled in August that he had seen her in the lobby when she arrived. (Even so, police were still cautious since he did not know Judy personally.) A detective who searched the Smiths' hotel room said it struck her as unusual that the clothes Judy left behind did not appear to have been worn at all, suggesting she had worn the same clothes both on her flight from Boston and the day she disappeared; nor did she appear to have brought any cosmetics. Her daughter said that was typical travel behavior for her mother.

The police also made much of what they asserted was Jeffrey's refusal to take a lie detector test. He says he never refused; he only insisted that any such test be administered by the FBI and that if he passed, the police formally request that the bureau assist with its investigation. According to McGinnis, at the time he made that demand Jeffrey already knew the FBI would not join the investigation, and still declined to submit to the test even when the Philadelphia police arranged for it to be administered by the Massachusetts State Police. "Certain conditions were met, but as far as I'm concerned he refused", said deputy commissioner Richard Zappile.

Jeffrey hired three private investigators to aid in the search for his wife. He distributed copies of his wife's missing person flyer to hospitals all over the country and asked them to keep an eye out for her. His efforts contributed to the identification of her remains.

=== Possible sightings ===
In the days after Judy disappeared, Philadelphia newspapers and television ran stories about the case. Jeffrey and friends and family put up flyers with her picture seeking information. These led to reports of sightings, some of which Jeffrey found credible. Most were in the city, but later reports came from outside the city.

A number of reports described a woman who matched Judy's description but appeared to have psychological problems. She was described by staff at the Society Hill Hotel as their "weirdo of the week" when she stayed there between April 13 and 15, signing in as "H.K. Rich/Collins". While there, she masturbated in front of an open window spoke to herself in tongues and then loudly claimed "the emperor" would wire her money when she needed it to extend her stay.

Another report mentioned a woman at the junction of Broad and Locust Streets around 3 p.m. on the day Judy was last seen, describing the woman as "disoriented". There were some other reports of a similar woman, also apparently disturbed, in the Penn's Landing neighborhood -- a PHLASH stop and popular tourist attraction as well. Both the police and the family believe that those who saw her confused Judy with a homeless woman in the area who strongly resembled her, so much that even Judy's son thought the woman was his mother when he saw her from across the street.

A homeless man in Penn's Landing, when shown Judy's picture, insisted he had seen her and not the other homeless woman sleeping on a bench next to him the night before. On April 15, he told the family that they had just missed this woman, but they were unable to locate her in the vicinity. The family believed this was significant because it was the last time anyone had identified Judy based on seeing her picture.

Sightings that seemed a more positive identification were centered around the PHLASH bus and its route. A hotel employee said she had asked later on the morning of April 10 where she could catch the bus nearby; a driver said he had picked her up at Front and South Streets early in the afternoon and may have let her off near the hotel. She was also reportedly seen entering and leaving the city's Greyhound bus terminal, possibly to use the bathroom, her family believes. The terminal is near Philadelphia's Chinatown, and since Judy loved Chinese and Thai food she might have gone there to eat; however, no one at any of the many restaurants in the neighborhood recalled her.

Another report surfaced that Judy had been seen shopping for dresses at Macy's in the Deptford Mall in Deptford Township, New Jersey, across the Delaware River. She could have gotten there, they realized, via NJ Transit Bus Route 400, which makes hourly runs to the mall from Market Street in Center City and the intersection of Broad and Cherry Streets. A salesperson and customer at Macy's gave an account of the actions of a woman there who may have been Judy, saying she had said she was shopping for her daughter even though her daughter often disliked what she bought her—which rang true to her family—and giving a description that included the distinctive red backpack she carried almost everywhere, especially when traveling. As the woman left, they recalled, she had tried to get a younger woman, whom they assumed at the time was the woman's daughter, to leave with her.

There were also reports that she had been seen in Easton, 55 miles (89 km) north of Philadelphia, a few days after going missing. Jeffrey Smith finds another report from Philadelphia "more credible." A private investigator he had hired told a reporter that later in the week a man told Smith he had been leaving a Wawa near Rittenhouse Square on his way to work just before 6 a.m. when he saw "a well-dressed white woman" sitting outside a nearby gourmet grocery store, a sight he found unusual for that time of day. Later he saw a newspaper article on the case and realized the woman looked a lot like Judy.

== Discovery of body ==
1 DoubleTree Hilton, Center City, Philadelphia where Judy was staying and disappeared from.
2 September 7, 1997 - Stoney Fork, Chestnut Creek, Asheville, North Carolina where skeletal remains where found of decedent with arthritic knee.

On September 7, 1997, a father and son hunting for deer out of season on a hillside in an area of North Carolina's Pisgah National Forest found what appeared to be human bones near the Stoney Fork picnic area along Chestnut Creek, just 9.3 miles (15 km) from Asheville. The bones had been scattered around an area 300 feet (91 m) in diameter, likely by animals. At the center was a shallow grave where the majority of the skeleton remained, still partially buried and clothed. Some personal effects were found in the area as well.

The state medical examiner determined that the bones of the then unidentified decedent were those of a white woman between the ages of 40 and 55. She had had extensive dental work and suffered from severe arthritis in her left knee. There were cutting marks on her ribs, and among the clothing recovered from the scene was her bra, which also had cuts and punctures. The investigation concluded that she had been fatally stabbed, and her death was officially classified as a homicide.

The remains did not stay unidentified for long. An emergency room physician in Franklin, North Carolina, 65 miles (105 km) west of Asheville, saw an article about the discovery in the newspaper. He connected it to one of the flyers Jeffrey had sent out and faxed a copy of the article to the Philadelphia police. A detective there asked Jeffrey for his wife's dental records, which he provided; they were then sent to the medical examiner in Asheville. Using her dental records, the remains were positively identified as those of Judy Smith.

While the discovery of Judy's remains ended the missing person investigation, the homicide investigation it started posed new questions for detectives with the Buncombe County Sheriff's Office, which took the lead role. In order to identify her killer, they would probably need to figure out how she got to North Carolina in the first place. The evidence found with her bones suggested that she had been with someone else, possibly whoever killed her, and that she had been alive when she reached the Asheville area.

Most significantly, her leg bones were still clad in jeans, thermal underwear, and hiking boots. These were not the clothes she was wearing when Jeffrey or any of the other witnesses who might have seen her in Philadelphia saw her, but they were what she might have worn while hiking in the mountains around Asheville in mid-April. No wallet or other identification was found in her pockets.

A blue and black vinyl backpack was found with the body; in it were winter clothes and $80 in cash. A shirt buried nearby also had $87 in the pockets. The combined $167 is consistent with the $200 Jeffrey believed Judy to have had on her at the time of her disappearance; the presence of the money and her wedding ring have led investigators to conclude that robbery was not the motivation for her killing. However, her red backpack was not found, nor other clothes she was wearing when last seen. Judy's family also said that an expensive pair of sunglasses found near the bones were not hers as far as they knew.

Judy's family could not imagine why she might have gone to the Asheville area. According to them, she never expressed any desire to go there, and had only twice been to that general region of the country. Once she had visited Jeffrey for a week when he was at a weight loss clinic in Raleigh–Durham; on another occasion she had accompanied a patient on a drive south as he visited family that either lived closer in North Carolina to Asheville or in a neighboring area of Virginia or Tennessee (the family's memories differ).

=== Sightings in Asheville area ===
Several people in the Asheville area recalled having seen Judy, or a woman matching her description, in April. A clerk at a local retailer said: "She seemed very alert to me. She was very pleasant. I didn't see anything about her that would indicate that she wasn't right in any way." The woman she talked to said her husband was an attorney from Boston, attending a conference in Philadelphia, and during that time she had just decided to go to the Asheville area.

An employee at the Biltmore Estate also recalls seeing Judy. At a campground near where her body was found, the owner recalls that she drove up in a gray sedan filled with boxes and bags, asked if she could spend the night there in her car, and drove away after learning she could not. A deli owner in the same area told the Philadelphia City Paper that Judy came up to her store in a gray sedan and bought $30 worth of sandwiches and a toy truck. Local investigators consider these sightings credible.

== Theories ==
Investigators with the Buncombe County sheriff's office have ruled out Jeffrey Smith, who died in 2005, as a suspect, since as he was morbidly obese they believe he would have been physically unable to have taken his wife's body up the slope to where it was found. His presence at the conference during the day Judy disappeared has also been corroborated. The Philadelphia police, however, never eliminated him as a suspect.

Sam Constance, the Buncombe detective who investigated the case, believes Judy was not abducted and came to the Asheville area voluntarily. Constance also did not believe Judy was killed elsewhere and dumped at the site, due to the distance anyone — even someone in the best physical condition — would have had to carry her body were their intention to bury it there.

While Jeffrey and her children did not say there had been any problems in the marriage, one of her friends said otherwise. "At the time this happened, Jeff and Judy's marriage was very tenuous", Carolyn Dickey told Unsolved Mysteries in 2001. "I believe that something did happen that triggered her to want to have some time away from Jeff".

Although some of Judy's jewelry was missing, the presence of most of it and the cash suggests that robbery was not a motive for the killing.

It has also been suggested that she might have encountered Gary Michael Hilton, a serial killer who was later arrested and convicted of several killings on hiking trails in national forests in the southern Appalachian Mountains in 2007–8. He has not been linked to Smith's killing. While he did leave the raped and murdered body of one of his victims tied to a tree not far away from the site where Smith's body was found, his known killings did not begin until October 2007, just over a decade after her murder.

The state of North Carolina and Jeffrey combined to offer $17,000 in reward money for any information leading to the resolution of the case.

== See also ==
- Crime in North Carolina
- Crime in Philadelphia
- Deaths in 1997
- Lists of solved missing person cases
- List of unsolved murders (1980–1999)
- Deaths of Arnold Archambeau and Ruby Bruguier, South Dakota couple who disappeared after 1992 car accident; bodies found near site three months later with evidence they might have been alive for some time afterwards
- Death of David Glenn Lewis, Texas man killed in 1993 road accident near Yakima, Washington, and not identified for 11 years
- Jonathan Luna, federal prosecutor who drove from Baltimore to rural Pennsylvania for unknown reasons where he was found dead, possibly murdered, one night in 2003
