= Duncan Ridge Trail =

Long-distance hiking trail in the United States

Coordinates: 34°47′28″N 84°01′29″W

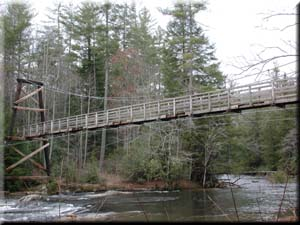
- Length: 35.5 miles (57.13 km)
- Location: Chattahoochee National Forest, Georgia, United States
- Designation: National Recreation Trail
- Trailheads: Intersection with Benton MacKaye Trail/Appalachian Trail at Long Creek; Blood Mountain Wilderness (reconnects with Appalachian Trail)
- Use: Hiking
- Sights: Toccoa River swinging bridge, Long Creek Falls
- Maintained by: U.S. Forest Service (Brasstown and Toccoa Ranger Districts)

The Duncan Ridge Trail is a hiking trail that has been designated as a National Recreation Trail in Georgia. The trail is 35.5 miles (53.25 km.) long and traverses mountains, descends into valleys and features scenic viewpoints and waterfalls. It is located in the Chattahoochee National Forest and is maintained by the U.S. Forest Service in the Brasstown and Toccoa Ranger Districts.

The Duncan Ridge Trail starts at an intersection with the Benton MacKaye Trail and the Appalachian Trail at Long Creek and crosses the Toccoa River on a 260-foot (79 m) swinging bridge. The eastern end of the trail combines with the Coosa Backcountry Trail and ultimately ends in the Blood Mountain Wilderness, where it reconnects with the Appalachian Trail. Long Creek Falls is a waterfall that is accessible from the Duncan Ridge Trail.
