= Trahlyta =

Cherokee mythological character

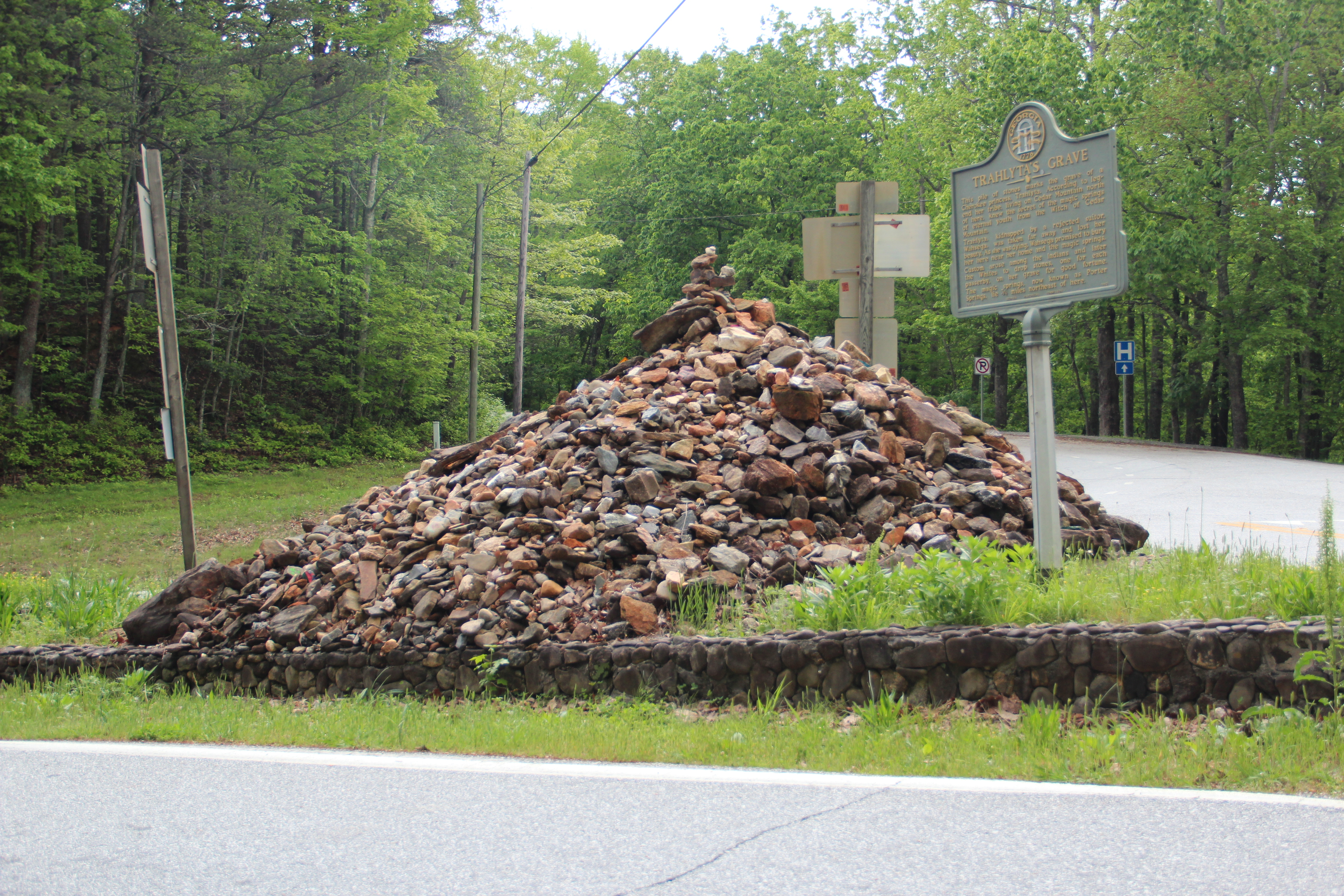
Trahlyta's Grave at Stonepile Gap

Trahlyta was a woman in Cherokee legend who is said to have lived in the North Georgia Mountains near present-day Dahlonega in the United States. Trahlyta supposedly drank from a nearby Fountain of Youth to maintain her renowned beauty. The warrior Wahsega courted her, but Trahlyta rejected his courtship, and the angered warrior kidnapped and imprisoned Trahlyta in some unknown location away from the beauty's mountain home. Trahlyta longed to see her home again, but her captor did not relent, and she grew weak and died.

Her dying wish, according to the legend, was to be buried in the mountain forests whence she came. According to the historical marker at the site of her supposed grave, "custom arose among the Indians and later the Whites to drop stones, one for each passerby, on her grave for good fortune." Today there is a pile of stones reaching at least five feet high.

Trahlyta's beloved home was said to be in the vicinity of Cedar Mountain. Her "fountain of youth" is often associated with nearby Porter Springs, where a resort community operated in the late 1800s and early 1900s for people who believed the waters had healthful properties. The site of the rockpile over her alleged grave, complete with a historical marker, is called Stonepile Gap. These are all minor tourist attractions.

Lake Trahlyta in Union County, Georgia is named after the Indian maiden.
