= Dick's Knob =

Mountain in United States of America

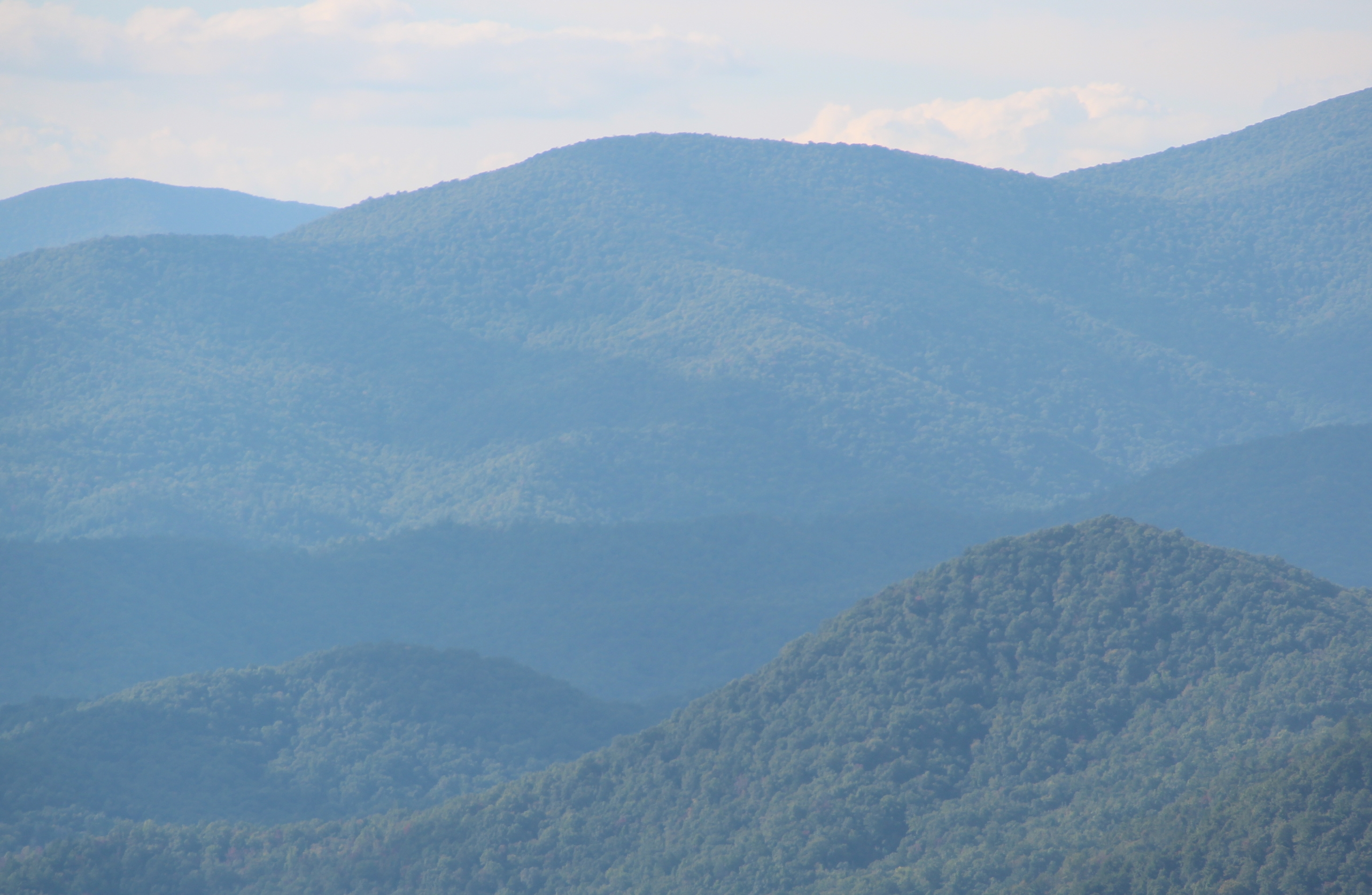
- Dick's Knob viewed from Black Rock Mountain State Park

Highest point
- Elevation: 4,620 ft (1,410 m)
- Coordinates: 34°59′08″N 83°31′18″W

Geography
- Location: Rabun County, Georgia, U.S.
- Parent range: Blue Ridge Mountains
- Topo map: USGS Hightower Bald

Climbing
- First ascent: unknown
- Easiest route: Hike

Dick's Knob or Dicks Knob, with an elevation of 4,620 feet (1,408 m), is the third-highest peak in the U.S. State of Georgia if using a 200 ft. (61 m) prominence rule. It is located in Rabun County, Georgia within the Southern Nantahala Wilderness and is the second-highest mountain in the county.

== Mountain ==
Dick's Knob is located in the Southern Nantahala Wilderness in the Chattahoochee National Forest on Pot Gap Ridge near the North Carolina border. The summit is located 0.5 miles (0.80 km) south of the North Carolina border, 2 miles (3.2 km) east of Tate City and 10 miles (16 km) northwest of Clayton. Nearby geographical features include the Tallulah River, Standing Indian Mountain and Grassy Ridge. Dick's Knob is part of the southern Crystalline Appalachians. A dwarfed oak forest covers the mountain's summit.

The summit of Dick's Knob was burned during the 2016 Rock Mountain Fire.

== Hiking ==
No trails pass over the summit of Dick's Knob. However, the mountain can be reached by hiking off-trail south from the Appalachian Trail at Beech Gap or east from the Tate Branch Campground near Tate City.

== See also ==
- List of mountains in Georgia (U.S. state)
