= Water conflict =

Conflict over an access to water resources

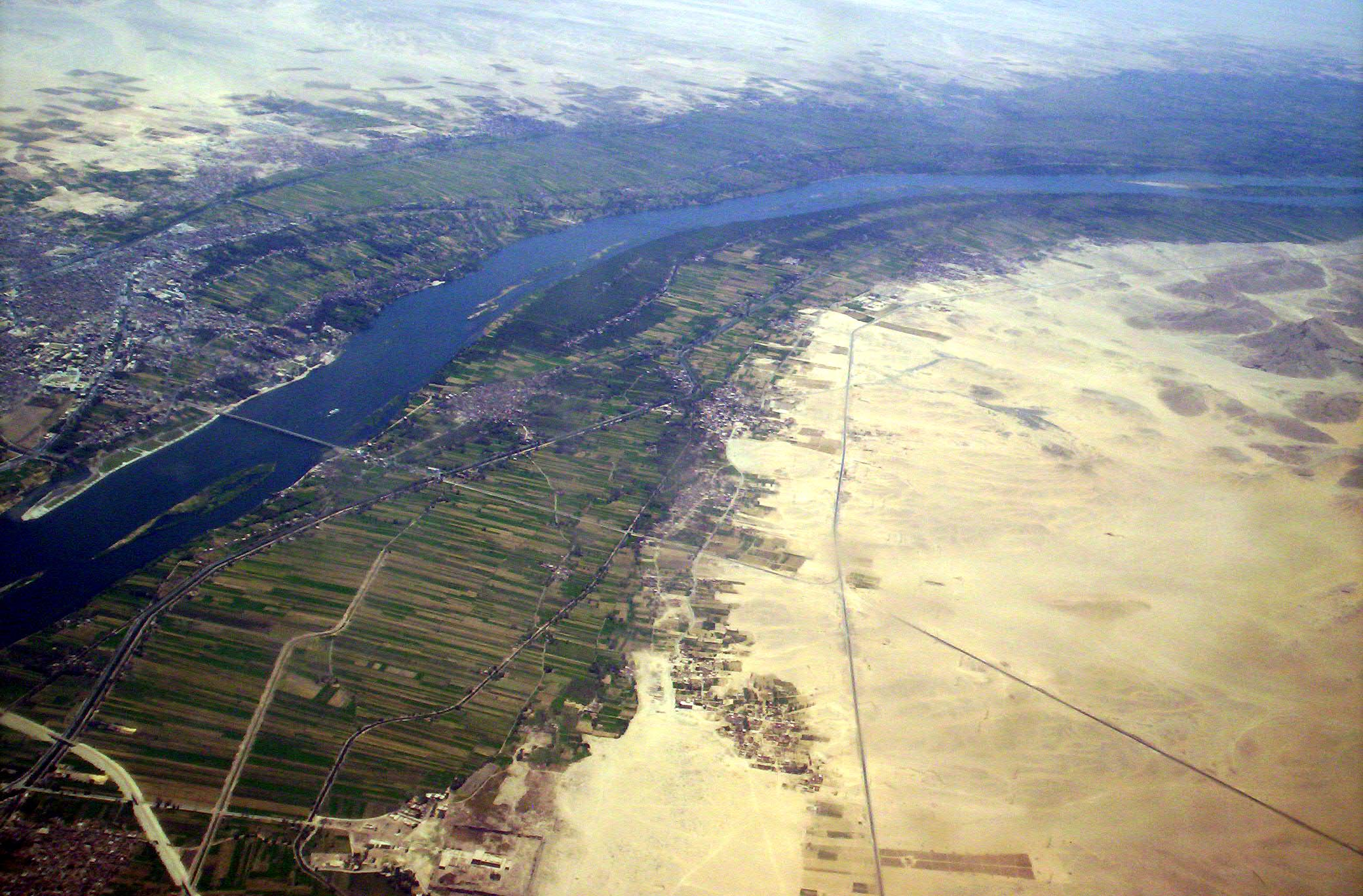
Ethiopia's move to fill the GERD dam's reservoir could reduce Nile flows by as much as 25% and devastate Egyptian farmlands.

Water conflict typically refers to violence or disputes associated with access to, or control of, water resources, or the use of water or water systems as weapons or casualties of conflicts. The term water war is colloquially used in media for some disputes over water, and often is more limited to describing a conflict between countries, states, or groups over the rights to access water resources. The United Nations recognizes that water disputes result from opposing interests of water users, public or private. A wide range of water conflicts appear throughout history, though they are rarely traditional wars waged over water alone. Instead, water has long been a source of tension and one of the causes for conflicts. Water conflicts arise for several reasons, including territorial disputes, a fight for resources, and strategic advantage.

Water conflicts can occur on the intrastate and interstate levels. Interstate conflicts occur between two or more countries that share a transboundary water source, such as a river, sea, or groundwater basin. For example, the Middle East has only 1% of the world's fresh water shared among 5% of the world's population and most of the rivers cross international borders. Intrastate conflicts take place between two or more parties in the same country, such as conflicts between farmers and urban water users.

Most water-related conflicts occur over fresh water because these resources are necessary for basic human needs but can often be scarce or contaminated or poorly allocated among users. Water scarcity worsens water disputes because of competition for potable water, irrigation, electricity generation and other needs. As freshwater is a vital, yet unevenly distributed natural resource, its availability often influences the living and economic conditions of a country or region. The lack of cost-effective water supply options in areas like the Middle East, among other elements of water crises can put severe pressures on all water users, whether corporate, government, or individual, leading to tension, and possibly aggression.

There is a growing number of water conflicts that go unresolved, largely at the sub-national level, and these will become more dangerous as water becomes more scarce, climate change alters local hydrology, and global population increases. The broad spectrum of water disputes makes them difficult to address, but a wide range of strategies to reduce the risks of such disputes are available. Local and international laws and agreements can help improve sharing of international rivers and aquifers. Improved technology and institutions can both improve water availability and water sharing in water-scarce regions.

== Causes ==
Water scarcity has most often led to conflicts at local and regional levels. Water is a vital element for human life, and human activities are closely connected to availability and quality of water. Water is a limited resource. Water conflicts occur because the demand for water resources and potable water can exceed supply, or because control over access and allocation of water may be disputed, or because water management institutions are weak or missing. Elements of a water crisis may put pressures on affected parties to obtain more of a shared water resource, causing diplomatic tension or outright conflict.

Tensions and conflicts over water now occur more frequently at the subnational, rather than the transnational, level. Violence between pastoralists and farmers in sub-Saharan Africa are on the rise. Attacks on civilian water systems during wars that start for other reasons have increased, such as in Yemen, Syria, Iraq, and most recently Ukraine. Water scarcity can also exacerbate conflicts and political tensions which are not directly caused by water. Gradual reductions over time in the quality and/or quantity of fresh water can add to the instability of a region by depleting the health of a population, obstructing economic development, and exacerbating larger conflicts.

Climate change and growing global populations also combine to put new pressures on limited water resources and increase the risk of water conflict.

== Predictions ==
Politicians, academics and journalists have frequently expressed concern that disputes over water would be a source of future wars. Commonly cited quotes include: that of former Egyptian Foreign Minister and former Secretary-General of the United Nations Boutros Boutros-Ghali, who forecast, "The next war in the Middle East will be fought over water, not politics"; his successor at the United Nations, Kofi Annan, who in 2001 said, "Fierce competition for fresh water may well become a source of conflict and wars in the future," and the former Vice President of the World Bank, Ismail Serageldin, who said the wars of the next century will be over water unless significant changes in governance occurred. Moreover, "it is now commonly said that future wars in the Middle East are more likely to be fought over water than over oil," said Lester R. Brown at a previous Stockholm Water Conference.

The water wars hypothesis had its roots in earlier research carried out on a small number of transboundary rivers such as the Indus, Jordan, and Nile. These particular rivers became the focus because they had experienced water-related disputes. Specific events cited as evidence include Israel's bombing of Syria's attempts to divert the River Jordan's headwaters, and military threats by Egypt against any country building dams in the upstream waters of the Nile.

Another factor raising the risks of water conflicts is growing competition for water in water-scarce regions, where necessities for water supply for human use, food production, ecosystems and other uses are running up against water availability. Extreme hydrologic events such as floods and droughts are also worsening the risks of water conflicts. As populations and economic development increase, water demands can also increase, worsening disagreements over the allocation and control of limited water in some regions or countries, especially during drought, or in shared international watersheds.

Water resources that span international boundaries are more likely to be a source of collaboration and cooperation than war. Scientists working at the International Water Management Institute have been investigating the evidence behind water war predictions. Their findings show that, while it is true there has been conflict related to water in a handful of international basins, in the rest of the world's approximately 300 shared basins the record has been largely positive. This is exemplified by the hundreds of treaties in place guiding equitable water use between nations sharing water resources. The institutions created by these agreements can, in fact, be important factors in ensuring cooperation rather than conflict.

== Data and definitions ==
A comprehensive online open-source database of water-related conflicts — the Water Conflict Chronology — has been developed by the Pacific Institute. This database lists violence over water going back around 4,500 years and includes more than 1900 examples of violence over water resources with information on the date, location, type of conflict and full sources.

Water-related conflicts are categorized in the Water Conflict Chronology as follows:

- Trigger: Water as a trigger or root cause of conflict, where there is a dispute over the control of water or water systems or where economic or physical access to water, or scarcity of water, triggers violence.
- Weapon: Water as a weapon of conflict, where water resources, or water systems themselves, are used as a tool or weapon in a violent conflict.
- Casualty: Water resources or water systems as a casualty of conflict, where water resources, or water systems, are intentional or incidental casualties or targets of violence.

== Economic and trade issues ==
Water's viability as a commercial resource, which includes fishing, agriculture, manufacturing, recreation and tourism, among other possibilities, can create dispute even when access to potable water is not necessarily an issue. As a resource, some consider water to be as valuable as oil, needed by nearly every industry, and needed nearly every day. Water shortages can completely cripple an industry just as it can cripple a population, and affect developed countries just as they affect countries with less-developed water infrastructure. Water-based industries are more visible in water disputes, but commerce at all levels can be damaged by a lack of water.

=== Fishing ===
Historically, fisheries have been the main sources of question, as nations expanded and claimed portions of oceans and seas as territory for 'domestic' commercial fishing. Certain lucrative areas, such as the Bering Sea, have a history of dispute; in 1886 the British Empire and the United States clashed over sealing fisheries, and today Russia surrounds a pocket of international water known as the Bering Sea Donut Hole. Conflict over fishing routes and access to the hole was resolved in 1995 by a convention referred to colloquially as the Donut Hole Agreement.

=== Pollution ===
Corporate interest often crosses opposing commercial interest, as well as environmental concerns, leading to another form of dispute. In the 1960s, Lake Erie, and to a lesser extent, the other Great Lakes were polluted to the point of massive fish death. Local communities suffered greatly from dismal water quality until the United States Congress passed the Clean Water Act in 1972.

Water pollution poses a significant health risk, especially in heavily industrialized, heavily populated areas like China. In response to a worsening situation in which entire cities lacked safe drinking water, China passed a revised Water Pollution Prevention and Control Law. The possibility of polluted water making its way across international boundaries, as well as unrecognized water pollution within a poorer country brings up questions of human rights, allowing for international input on water pollution. There is no single framework for dealing with pollution disputes local to a nation.

== Responses ==
=== Cooperation ===
Transboundary institutions can be designed to promote cooperation, overcome initial disputes and find ways of coping with the uncertainty created by climate change. The effectiveness of such institutions can also be monitored.

The Indus River Commission and the 1960 Indus Water Treaty have survived two wars between India and Pakistan despite the two countries' mutual hostility, proving a successful mechanism in resolving conflicts by providing a framework for consultation, inspection and exchange of data. It is only now that the treaty has been suspended. The Mekong Committee has functioned since 1957 and outlived the Vietnam War of 1955–1975. In contrast, regional instability results when countries lack institutions to co-operate in regional collaboration, like Egypt's plan for a high dam on the Nile. As of 2019 no global institution supervises the management of trans-boundary water sources, and international co-operation has happened through ad hoc collaboration between agencies, like the Mekong Committee which formed due to an alliance between UNICEF and the US Bureau of Reclamation. Formation of strong international institutions seems to provide a way forward – they encourage early intervention and management, avoiding costly dispute-resolution processes.

The Israel/Jordan Project Prosperity water-for-energy deal, with the cooperation of the UAE, will bring solar generated electricity from Jordan to Israel, and Israel will provide desalinated water to Jordan. The UAE will assist with the installation of the solar power system in Jordan.

One common feature of almost all resolved disputes is that the negotiations had a "need-based" instead of a "right–based" paradigm. Irrigable lands, population, and technicalities of projects define "needs". The success of a need-based paradigm is reflected in the only water agreement ever negotiated in the Jordan River Basin, which focuses in needs not on rights of riparians. In the Indian subcontinent, the irrigation requirements of Bangladesh determine water allocations of the Ganges River. A need-based, regional approach focuses on satisfying individuals with their need of water, ensuring that minimum quantitative needs are met. It removes the conflict that arises when countries view the treaty from a national-interest point-of-view and move away from a zero-sum approach to a positive-sum, integrative approach that equitably allocates water and its benefits. This means that both equity and efficiency of water use systems become significant, particularly under water scarcity. The combination of these two performance factors should occur in the context of sustainability making continuous cooperation among all the stakeholders in a learning mode highly desirable.

=== Sustainable management of water resources ===
The Blue Peace framework developed by Strategic Foresight Group in partnership with the governments of Switzerland and Sweden offers a unique policy structure which promotes sustainable management of water resources combined with cooperation for peace. By making the most of shared water-resources through cooperation rather than mere allocation between countries, the chances for peace can increase. The Blue Peace approach has proven effective in (for example) the Middle East and the Nile basin.

==== Programs by the United Nations ====
The UN UNESCO-IHP Groundwater Portal aims to help improve understanding of water resources and foster effective water management. But by far the most active UN program in water dispute resolution is its Potential Conflict to Co-operation Potential (PCCP), which is in its third phase, training water professionals in the Middle East and organizing educational efforts elsewhere. Its target groups include diplomats, lawmakers, civil society, and students of water studies; by expanding knowledge of water disputes, it hopes to encourage cooperation between nations in dealing with conflicts.

UNESCO has published a map of trans-boundary aquifers. Academic work focusing on water disputes has yet to yield a consistent method for mediating international disputes, let alone local ones. But UNESCO faces optimistic prospects for the future as water conflicts become more public, and as increasing severity sobers obstinate interests.

=== Arbitration by international organizations ===
International organizations play the largest role in mediating water disputes and improving water management. From scientific efforts to quantify water pollution, to the World Trade Organization's efforts to resolve trade disputes between nations, many types of water disputes can be addressed through current frameworks and institutions.

The World Trade Organization (WTO) can arbitrate water disputes presented by its member states when the disputes are commercial in nature. The WTO has certain groups, such as its Fisheries Center, that work to monitor and rule on relevant cases, although it is by no means the authority on conflict over water resources.

Still, water conflict occurring domestically, as well as conflict that may not be entirely commercial in nature may not be suitable for arbitration by the WTO.

Because water is so central to agricultural trade, water disputes may be subtly implicated in WTO cases in the form of virtual water, water used in the production of goods and services but not directly traded between countries. Countries with greater access to water supplies may fare better from an economic standpoint than those facing crisis, which creates the potential for conflict. Outraged by agriculture subsidies that displace domestic produce, countries facing water shortages bring their case to the WTO.

The WTO plays more of a role in agriculturally based disputes that are relevant to conflict over specific sources of water. Still, it provides an important framework that shapes the way water will play into future economic disputes. One school of thought entertains the notion of war over water, the ultimate progression of an unresolved water dispute—scarce water resources combined with the pressure of exponentially increasing population may outstrip the ability of the WTO to maintain civility in trade issues.

== Transboundary water conflicts ==
Transboundary waters are waters in which two or more different states border the same body of water. In order to reduce the risk of water conflicts, transboundary water arrangements or agreements are often negotiated, but many shared international rivers still lack such treaties. According to the UN, these cooperations are supposed to be equitable and sustainable in that each state does not abuse the water, but rather use the water to their best benefits while protecting and reserving it.

International competition over water can arise when one country starts drawing more water from a shared water source. This is often the most efficient route to getting needed water, but in the long term can cause conflict if water is overdrafted. More than 50 countries on five continents are said to be at risk of conflict over water. Moreover, international water law can sometimes exacerbate the potential for conflict: the legal principles of "prior appropriation" and "riparianism" are both implicated in transboundary water conflicts as both can mean that good luck historically and geographically can legally divide countries into those with water abundance and those with scarcity.

Recent interstate conflicts have occurred mainly in the Middle East (disputes stemming from the Euphrates and Tigris Rivers shared by Turkey, Syria, and Iraq; and the Jordan River conflict shared by Israel, Lebanon, Jordan and the State of Palestine), in Africa (Nile River-related conflicts among Egypt, Ethiopia, and Sudan), as well as in Central Asia (the Aral Sea conflict among Kazakhstan, Uzbekistan, Turkmenistan, Tajikistan and Kyrgyzstan). In 2022 and 2023, tensions over the Helmand River shared by Iran and Afghanistan have also flared.

=== Gaza genocide ===
As part of the 2023-present Gaza genocide being committed by Israel, desalination plants and other water infrastructure are being intentionally destroyed alongside refugee camps, aid distribution centers and humanitarian convoys in an effort to bring about a famine and cause people to die of thirst. People living in Palestine report that they have been forced to drink salty, unclean, or unsanitary water.

=== 2026 Iran war ===
On 7 March 2026, as part of the war between Israel, The United States, and Iran, the United States intentionally hit an Iranian water desalination plant. Some countries, including Israel rely on desalination for adequate amounts of drinking water.

=== Tigris and Euphrates Rivers ===
Throughout history there has been much conflict over use of water from rivers such as the Tigris and Euphrates rivers and one of the earliest known "water wars" was around 2400 BCE between the ancient Sumerian states of Umma and Lagash over irrigation water. Turkey's Southeastern Anatolia Project (Turkish: Guneydogu Anadolu Projesi, or GAP) on the Euphrates has potentially serious consequences for water supplies in Syria and Iraq. During the 1950s multiple dams and other water projects were started as a result from water sharing concerns particularly for downstream countries.

=== Mekong basin (China and other Asian countries) ===
In the Mekong Basin, the most upstream country China has built a series of dams on the Mekong's headwaters, altering flow volumes and timing for downstream countries Vietnam, Laos, Cambodia and Thailand.

As of 2020, China has built 11 dams on the Mekong river, which flows from China through Myanmar, Laos, Thailand, Cambodia and Vietnam to the South China Sea. Experts fear that China's ability to control the Mekong's flow gives it leverage over downstream nations who rely on China's goodwill. In 2018, water levels in the Mekong River fell to their lowest in more than 100 years, even during the annual monsoon season. The Jinghong Dam, as of January 2020 the nearest Chinese dam upstream of the Thai border, has caused huge fluctuations in river levels, affecting people's livelihoods downstream by disrupting the river's natural cycle.

=== Aral Sea Crisis ===
Soviet-era overdevelopment of irrigation agriculture (especially for cotton) in Central Asia led to the Amu Darya River, shared by Uzbekistan, Turkmenistan, Tajikistan and Afghanistan, almost completely drying out, so much so that it has ceased to reach the Aral Sea, which is now much reduced in extent and volume.

=== Egypt and Ethiopia ===
In 1979, Egyptian President Anwar Sadat said that if Egypt were to ever go to war again it would be over water. Separately, amidst Egypt–Ethiopia relations, Ethiopian Prime Minister Meles Zenawi said: "I am not worried that the Egyptians will suddenly invade Ethiopia. Nobody who has tried that has lived to tell the story."

Conflict between Egypt and Ethiopia over the Grand Ethiopian Renaissance Dam escalated in 2020 because of concern the Ethiopian dam on the Blue Nile could reduce flows of water to Egypt, which is highly dependent on Nile River water. Ethiopian Prime Minister Abiy Ahmed warned that "No force can stop Ethiopia from building a dam. If there is need to go to war, we could get millions readied."

Egypt sees the dam as an existential threat. Both countries face the threat of water shortage, as demand for water is projected to increase with growing population, increased urbanisation and pursuit of economic growth. Tensions are made worse as a result of fundamental differences in beliefs over water rights; Egypt claims its rights to the Nile water on the basis of historical practice, whereas Ethiopia claims its rights to the water based on geography, where 85% of its water comes from highland sources within its territory. While the Nile Basin Initiative provides a platform to ensure sustainable management of water resources through cooperation of riparian countries, the Cooperative Framework Agreement has only been ratified by six of 11 countries as of November 2020.

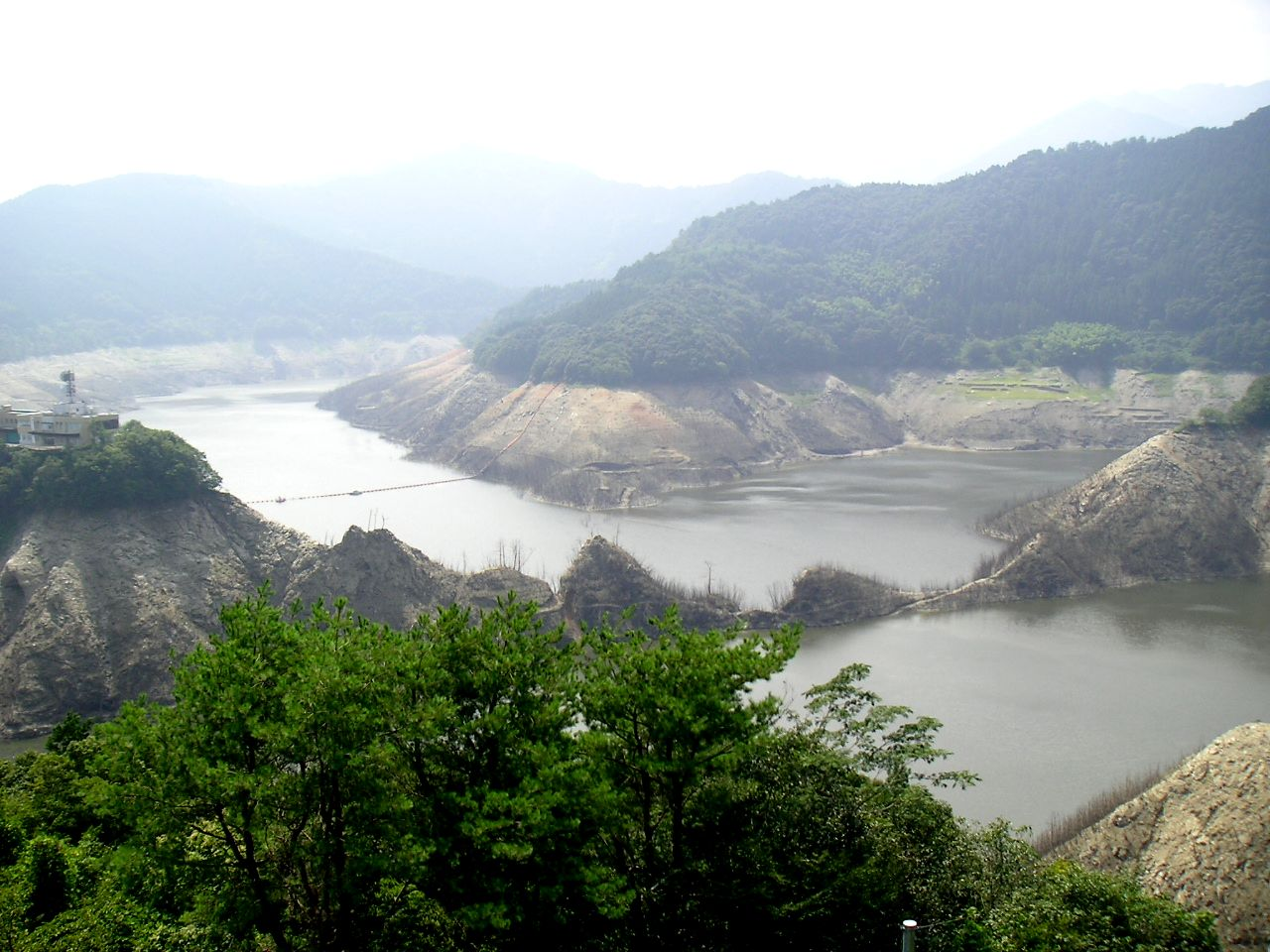
Due to record low rainfall in Summer 2005, the reservoir behind Sameura Dam runs low. The reservoir supplies water to Takamatsu, Shikoku Island, Japan.

=== India-Pakistan water conflicts ===
In 1948, India and Pakistan had a dispute over the sharing of water rights to the Indus River and its tributaries. An agreement was reached after five weeks and the dispute was followed by the signing of the Indus Waters Treaty in 1960.

Competition for transboundary water sources could also be worsened as a result of escalating tensions between countries, as in the case between India and Pakistan. Both countries are highly dependent on the Indus River Basin for water supply, which is governed primarily by the Indus Waters Treaty set out in 1960. In February 2019, India had threatened to cut off water supply to Pakistan, in response to the Kashmir military clash, diverting water to areas like Jammu, Kashmir and Punjab instead. The construction of dams upstream would also result in flooding downstream if water was released too quickly.

Since the two countries share the resources of the Indus water basin, India and Pakistan decided on a notable and influential treaty called the Indus Water Treaty (IWT). The treaty is mediated by the World Bank and regulates the water use and flow of the basin's multiple rivers by each country. The treaty has survived three wars, but seen its share of bilateral strains. Following high tensions in 2019, the Indian Prime Minister threatened to restrict water flow to Pakistan in the region – an act which Pakistan said it would consider an act of war.

== Transboundary water conflicts and their effects on the environment ==
=== Tigris and Euphrates Rivers ===
Since the 1960s, there has been conflict revolving around water in Turkey, Syria, and Iraq. Turkey, throughout the years, has continuously decided not to follow the 1987 agreement that ensured roughly 500 cubic metres per second (18,000 cu ft/s) of water is streamed down the Tigris and Euphrates Rivers to supply water for the Mesopotamian Marshes and millions of individuals. Turkey decided to start the Southeastern Anatolia Project or GAP, which is to build 20 dams that could hold up to 120 billion cubic metres (4.2×10^{12} cu ft) along with nineteen hydroelectric electricity generators leaving millions of people and wildlife living downstream that rely on both the Tigris and Euphrates Rivers with no water.

=== Turkey and the GAP Project ===
The Tigris and Euphrates River GAP project, which consists of (1.7 million hectares) has exasperated the situation and has created irreversible and future irreversible environmental damage not only to the surrounding countries but to Turkey as well. The GAP project decreased water by 50% from the Tigris and Euphrates Rivers to the surrounding downstream countries, Syria and Iraq. The lack of downstream water has led to many Kurds becoming homeless, increasing water salinity in the Euphrates reaching 1000 PPM and preventing Iraq from returning to rich organic soil used for agriculture. In addition, the lack of downstream water also prevent natural drainage, including salts and pollution that the rivers naturally got rid of, affecting the health of millions.

Annual time lapse of water levels of the Mesopotamian Marshes throughout early February.

=== Effects on the Mesopotamian Marshes ===
The Mesopotamian Marshes, also known as the Iraqi Marshes, saw a considerable decrease during the 1980-1988 war with Iran when Saddam Hussein, the fifth president of Iraq, accused Arab inhabitants of treachery and therefore used water as a weapon to push them out of the Marshes. To get thousands of people out of the area, the Iraq government drained 10%, which used to cover 9,000 square kilometres (3,500 sq mi) to 760 square kilometres (290 sq mi), and in 2005 only gained 40 percent of their original coverage. The Third River is a 172-kilometre long (107 mi) project that started in 1992. It involved an additional channel in capturing the downflow water from the Tigris River and moving it across the marshes and the Euphrates River near Al-Qurna. The project forced half a million marshland people to migrate, burnt down the surrounding towns, and polluted the surrounding farmland and water, making the land uninhabitable for thousands of species and human life.

=== Mosul and Haditha Reservoirs ===
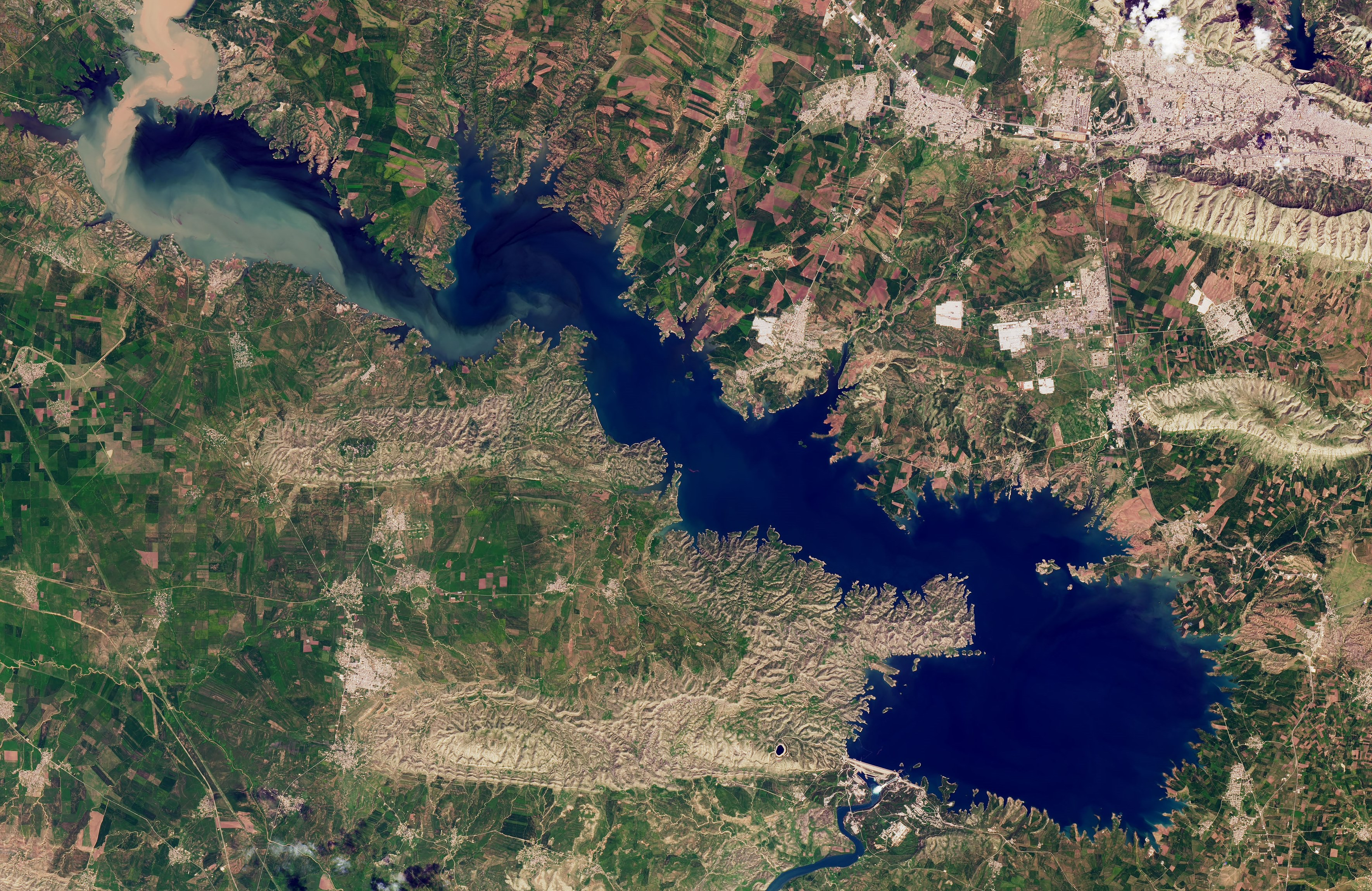
Water levels at a reservoir upstream of Mosul Dam.

The conflict in Tigris and Euphrates Rivers has resulted in reservoirs decreasing rapidly. In 1985 and 1986, the two biggest reservoirs, Mosul and Haditha, situated in the Tigris and Euphrates, were built to provide hydropower and downstream flow. During the first Gulf War, in 1990 and 1991, 3.3 square kilometres (1.3 sq mi) of surface area was lost per day in the Mosul reservoir falling from 372 to 346 kilometres (231 to 215 mi). On 25 January and 10 February 1991, the reservoir continued to lose about 3.4 square kilometres (1.3 sq mi) per day of the lake surface, leading to a final surface area of 215 square kilometres (83 sq mi) and a volume of 3.3 cubic kilometres (0.79 cu mi). This was the same time in February 1991 when multiple British bombers sent multiple missiles hitting bridges in southern and western Iraq, killing more than 100 in each attack and affecting water levels. During the same time, between 17 January and 10 February 1991, the Haditha reservoir, also situated in Iraq, lost an average of 2.5 square kilometres (0.97 sq mi) of lake surface per day and, in three weeks, a total of 21%. In August 2014, ISIS, a rebel group, captured the Mosul Dam, which Kurdish sources feared would be used to flood downstream countries, causing thousands of deaths. The US sent over 130 air strikes to help recapture the dam from ISIS in northern Iraq. The US also sent airstrikes hitting the areas surrounding the Haditha reservoir to stop ISIS from capturing another vital dam that is a source for millions. The conflict over the resource in the area caused both the Mosul and Haditha reservoirs to lose surface area at a rate of 2.0 square kilometres (0.77 sq mi) a day.

== Other notable conflicts ==
- The earliest known example of an actual inter-state conflict over water took place between 2500 and 2350 BC between the Sumerian states of Lagash and Umma.
- At a local level, a remarkable example is the 2000 Cochabamba protests in Bolivia, depicted in the 2010 Spanish film Even the Rain by Icíar Bollaín.
- Following Russia's annexation of Crimea, Ukraine blocked the North Crimean Canal, which provided 85% of Crimea's drinking water. Vasily Stashuk, Ukraine's top irrigation official at the time, said it would bring a humanitarian "catastrophe".
- In late April 2021, a conflict over water escalated into the most serious border clashes between Kyrgyzstan and Tajikistan since independence in 1991.
- War over Water (Jordan river) - tensions between Israel and the Arab League in late 1960s over water supply from Jordan river basin
- California Water Wars - were a series of conflicts between the city of Los Angeles, farmers and ranchers in the Owens Valley of Eastern California, and environmentalists
- Water wars in Florida - water crises in Florida
- Tennessee–Georgia water dispute - ongoing territorial dispute
- Tri-state water dispute - is a water use conflict between the states of Georgia, Alabama, and Florida over the Apalachicola-Chattahoochee-Flint River Basin and the Alabama-Coosa-Tallapoosa River Basin
- Kaveri River water dispute - A Water Conflict between the Indian states Karnataka and Tamil Nadu for Kaveri river which flows through the Karnataka and Tamil Nadu.
- Hirmand between Iranians and Afghanistanis 2023 Afghanistan–Iran clash
- Isfahan farmers

== Research ==
Some research from the International Water Management Institute and Oregon State University has found that water conflicts among nations are less likely than is cooperation, with hundreds of treaties and agreements in place. Water conflicts tend to arise as an outcome of other social issues. Conversely, the Pacific Institute has shown that while interstate (i.e., nation to nation) water conflicts are increasingly less likely, there appears to be a growing risk of sub-national conflicts among water users, regions, ethnic groups, and competing economic interests. Data from the Water Conflict Chronology show these intrastate conflicts to be a larger and growing component of all water disputes, and that the traditional international mechanisms for addressing them, such as bilateral or multilateral treaties, are not as effective. Some analysts estimate that due to an increase in human consumption of water resources, water conflicts will become increasingly common in the near future.

Naho Mirumachi and John Anthony Allan proposed the Transboundary Water Interaction Nexus (TWIN) approach in 2007 as a two-dimensional method to approaching water conflict and cooperation. This model neglects the conventional linear continuum of conflict and cooperation and instead sees the two as coexisting and not mutually exclusive. They postulate that not all cooperation is good, and not all conflict is bad. The TWINS approach can also serve as a useful final step after separate. analyses on cooperative methods and conflict intensity measures. The model is split into two parts—the horizontal scale (measures cooperation intensity) and the vertical scale (measures conflict intensity).

== See also ==
- Hydraulic empire
- Nomadic conflict
- Resource war
- Water politics
- Water security
