= Hightower Bald =

Mountain in Georgia, United States

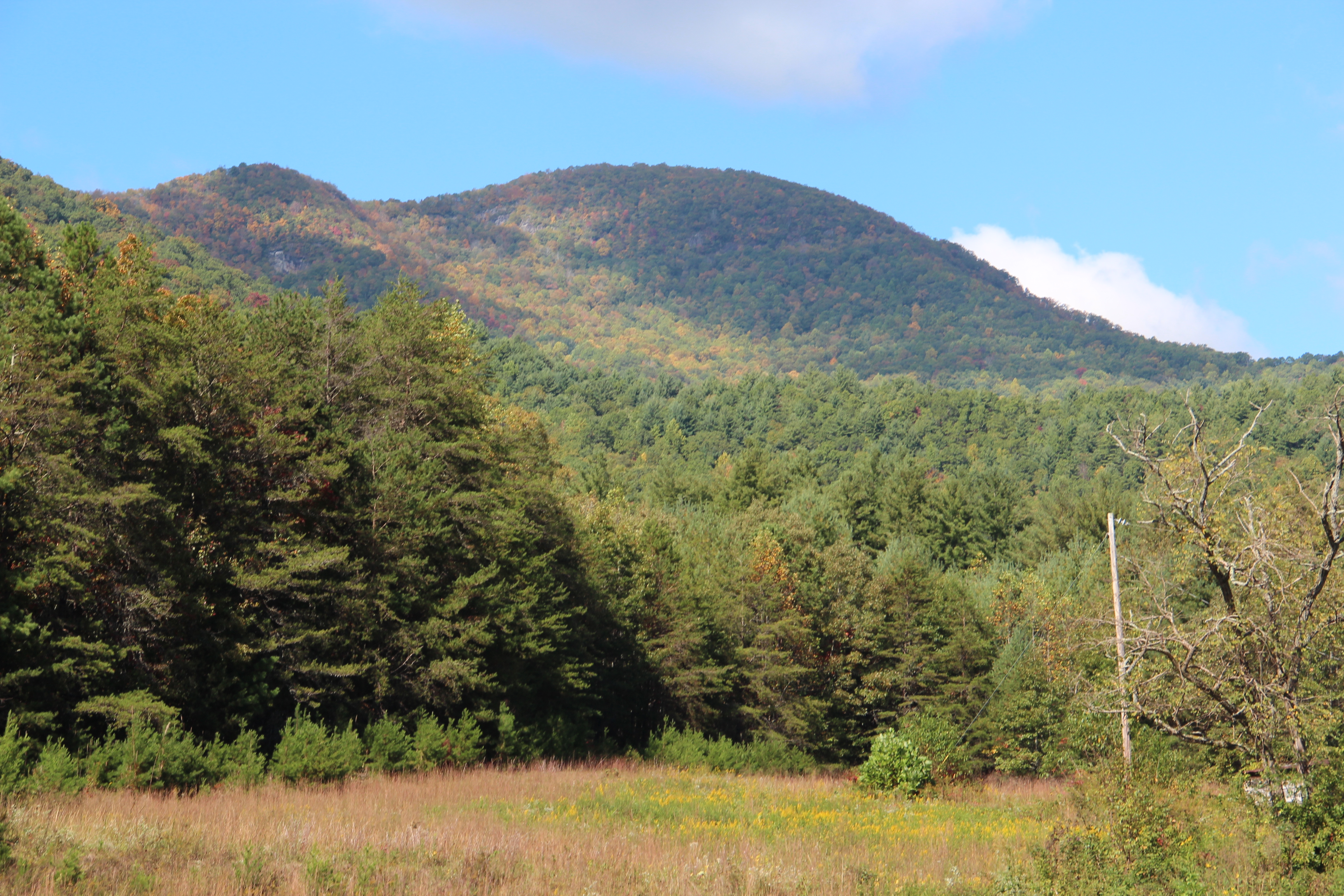
- Hightower Bald

Highest point
- Elevation: 4,568 ft (1,392 m)
- Prominence: 848 ft (258 m)
- Coordinates: 34°59′05″N 83°37′13″W

Geography
- Location within Georgia
- Location: Towns County Georgia, United States
- Parent range: Blue Ridge Mountains
- Topo map: USGS Hightower Bald

Climbing
- Easiest route: Hike

Hightower Bald, with an elevation of 4,568 feet (1,392 m) is the fourth-highest peak in the US state of Georgia. It is located in Towns County, Georgia at the North Carolina state line and is within the boundaries of the Southern Nantahala Wilderness of the Chattahoochee National Forest.

== Geography ==
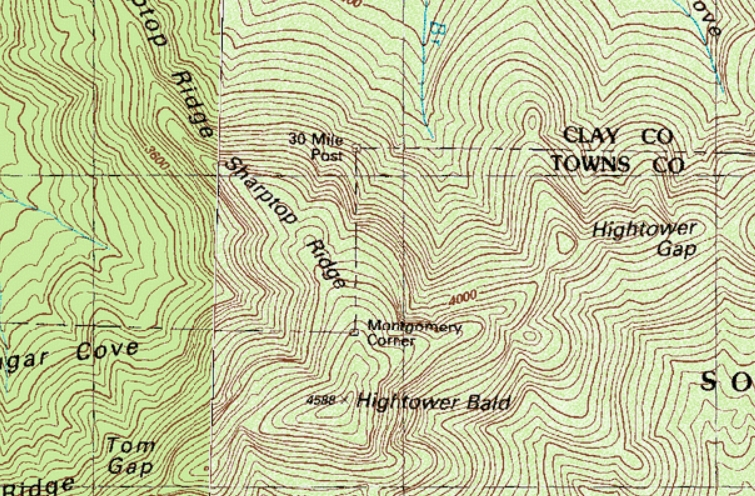
Map showing the 30 Mile Post, Montgomery's Corner and Hightower Bald

Hightower Bald is located on an east–west trending ridge inside the Southern Nantahala Wilderness of the Chattahoochee National Forest in Towns County, Georgia. The mountain is located about 8 miles (13 km) east of Hiawassee and 4 miles (6.4 km) west of Tate City. Nearby geographical features include Rich Knob, Shooting Creek Bald, Loggy Branch Cove and Bly Gap. There are cliffs on the south face of the mountain.

On Hightower Bald's northern slopes are two border features: Montgomery's Corner and the 30 Mile Post. Between these two points, the North Carolina-Georgia border runs in a north–south direction for about 2,000 feet (610 m) instead of its usual east–west direction. These border features were the results of two surveying expeditions conducted in the early 19th century. When Tennessee became a state in 1796, Congress designated Georgia's northern boundaries as the 35th parallel north. In 1818, mathematician James Camak incorrectly calculated the 35th parallel north as being located south of Nickajack Lake. Camak and his survey team then proceeded to mark Georgia's northern border 110 miles (180 km) east, stopping about 700 feet (210 m) north of Hightower Bald's summit.

In 1819, Camak conducted another survey of Georgia's northern border, this time starting from Ellicott's Rock and surveying westward. After marking for 30 miles (48 km), Camak's group reached Hightower Bald's northern slopes. When they got there, they noticed that they were 661 yards (604 m) north of the previous year's mark. Instead of redoing the survey, Camak decided to connect the eastward and westward lines. The southern mark was named Montgomery's Corner, after a surveyor who accompanied Camak in his two surveying trips. This mistake played a part in a water rights dispute between Georgia and Tennessee; Georgia was unable to withdraw water from the Tennessee River despite the river passing through the 35th parallel.

== Flora and fauna ==
The summit of Hightower Bald contains a dwarfed red oak forest, with beaked hazel and hawthorn trees in the understory. Hightower Bald's cliffs is home to Hypericum (Blue Ridge St. John's wort), selaginella rupestris (rock spikemoss) and viburnum alnifolium (wild hydrangea). Acer saccharum (Sugar Maple), cladrastis kentukea (yellowwood), Liriodendron tulipifera (tulip tree) and birches grow at Loggy Branch Cove, located on the mountain's northern side. The forest on Hightower Bald's northern slope is described as a broadleaf deciduous cove forest.

Southern red-backed voles are also found on the mountain.

== Hiking ==
No trails pass over Hightower Bald's summit. However, the mountain can be reached by off-trail west from the Appalachian Trail at Rich Knob or Bly Gap.

== See also ==
- List of mountains in Georgia (U.S. state)
