= Southeastern United States wildfires =

Southeastern United States wildfires may refer to:

- 2016 Southeastern United States wildfires
- 2025 Southeastern United States wildfires
