= Grassy Ridge =

Ridge in Rabun County, Georgia

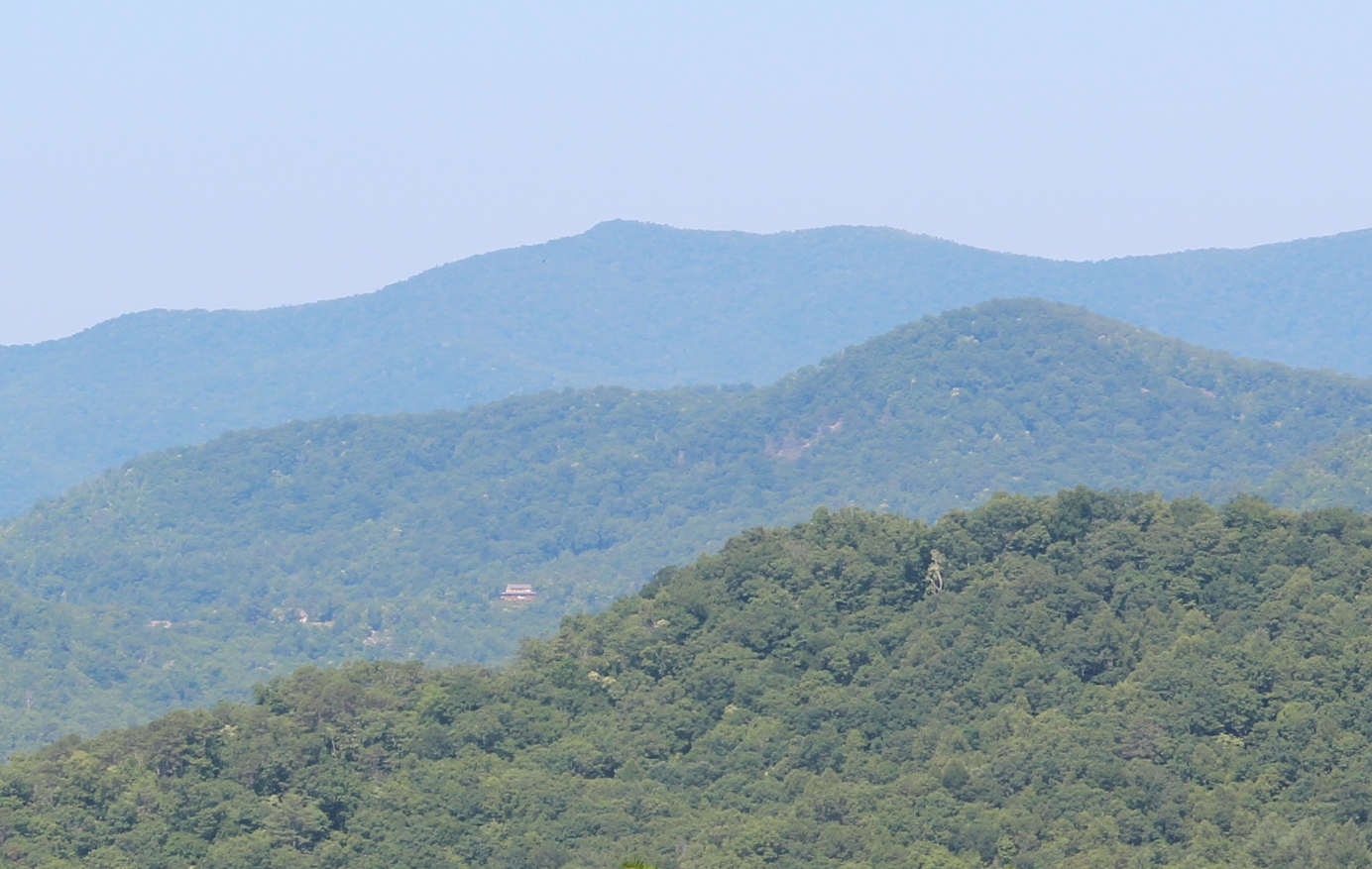
- Grassy Ridge viewed from Georgia State Route 246

Highest point
- Elevation: 4,420 ft (1,350 m)
- Coordinates: 34°59′01″N 83°28′59″W

Geography
- Location: Rabun County, Georgia, U.S.
- Parent range: Blue Ridge Mountains
- Topo map: USGS Dillard

Climbing
- First ascent: unknown
- Easiest route: Hike

Grassy Ridge is a ridge in the Blue Ridge Mountains in Georgia that runs south to north along the Eastern Continental Divide in Rabun County, Georgia. At the southern end of the ridge, there is an unnamed peak with an elevation of just over 3,800 feet (1,200 m). From there, the ridge runs north, crossing the boundary between Georgia and North Carolina at just over 4,360 feet (1,330 m) and then ultimately joining Ridgepole Mountain in North Carolina. In between its southernmost point and North Carolina, there is another unnamed peak with an elevation of just over 4,420 feet (8th highest point in Georgia; 3rd highest point in Rabun County) and a gap called Nichols Gap with an elevation of 4,169 feet (1,271 m). Grassy Ridge is in the Southern Nantahala Wilderness of the Chattahoochee National Forest

Grassy Ridge was burned during the 2016 Rock Mountain Fire.

== See also ==
- List of mountains in Georgia (U.S. state)

== Sources ==
- Georgia Above 4,000 Feet
