= Tri-State Corner =

Tripoint of the U.S. states of Tennessee, Georgia, and Alabama

Coordinates: 34°59′05″N 85°36′19″W

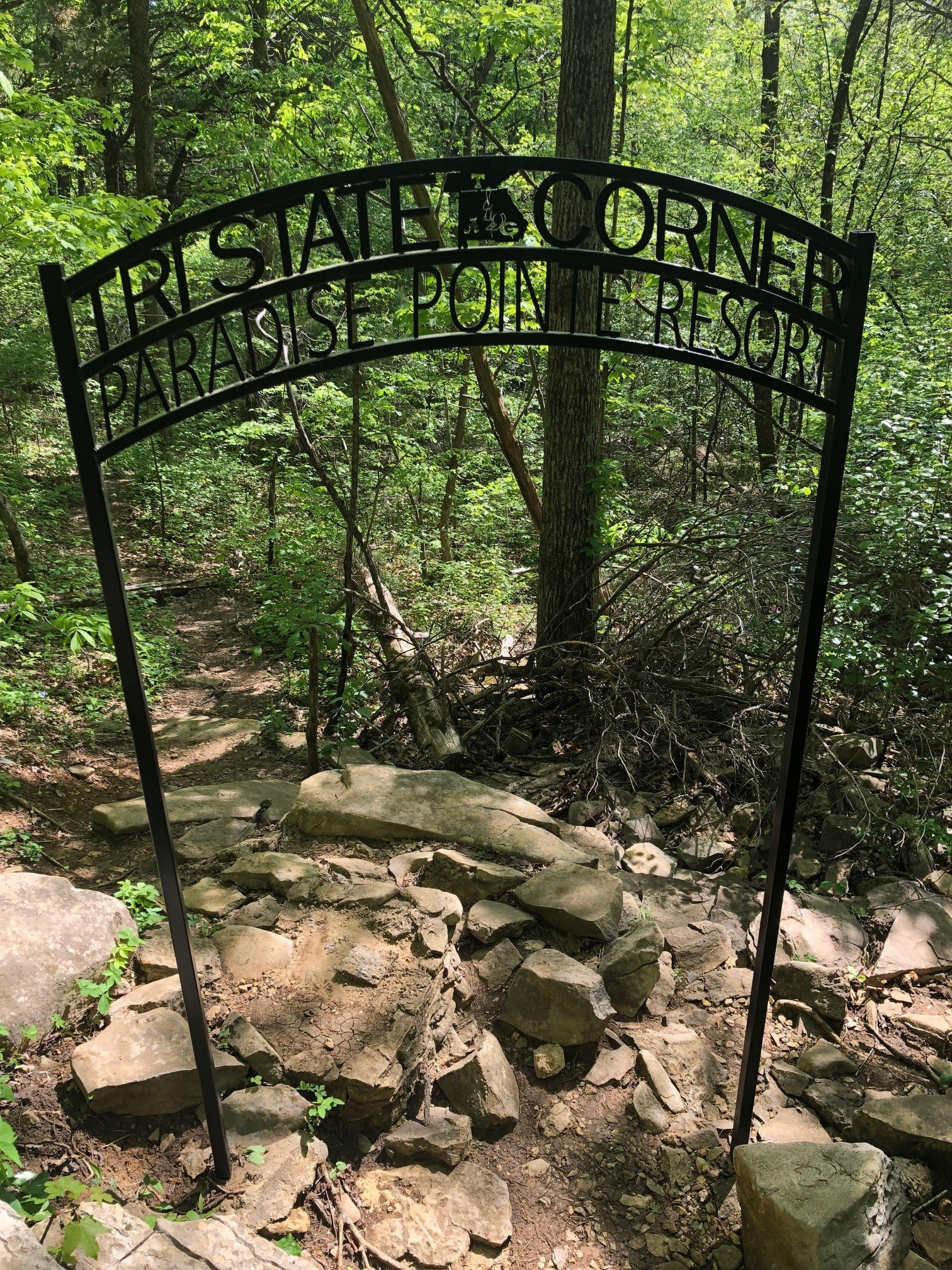
AL-GA-TN Tri-State Corner, with identification sign nearby.

Tri-State Corner is the local name for the tripoint between the U.S. states of Tennessee, Georgia, and Alabama. The tripoint is located at the base of a mountain about 200 yards (180 m) south of Nickajack Lake, an impoundment of the Tennessee River. It is accessible from a nearby cemetery via a short trail.

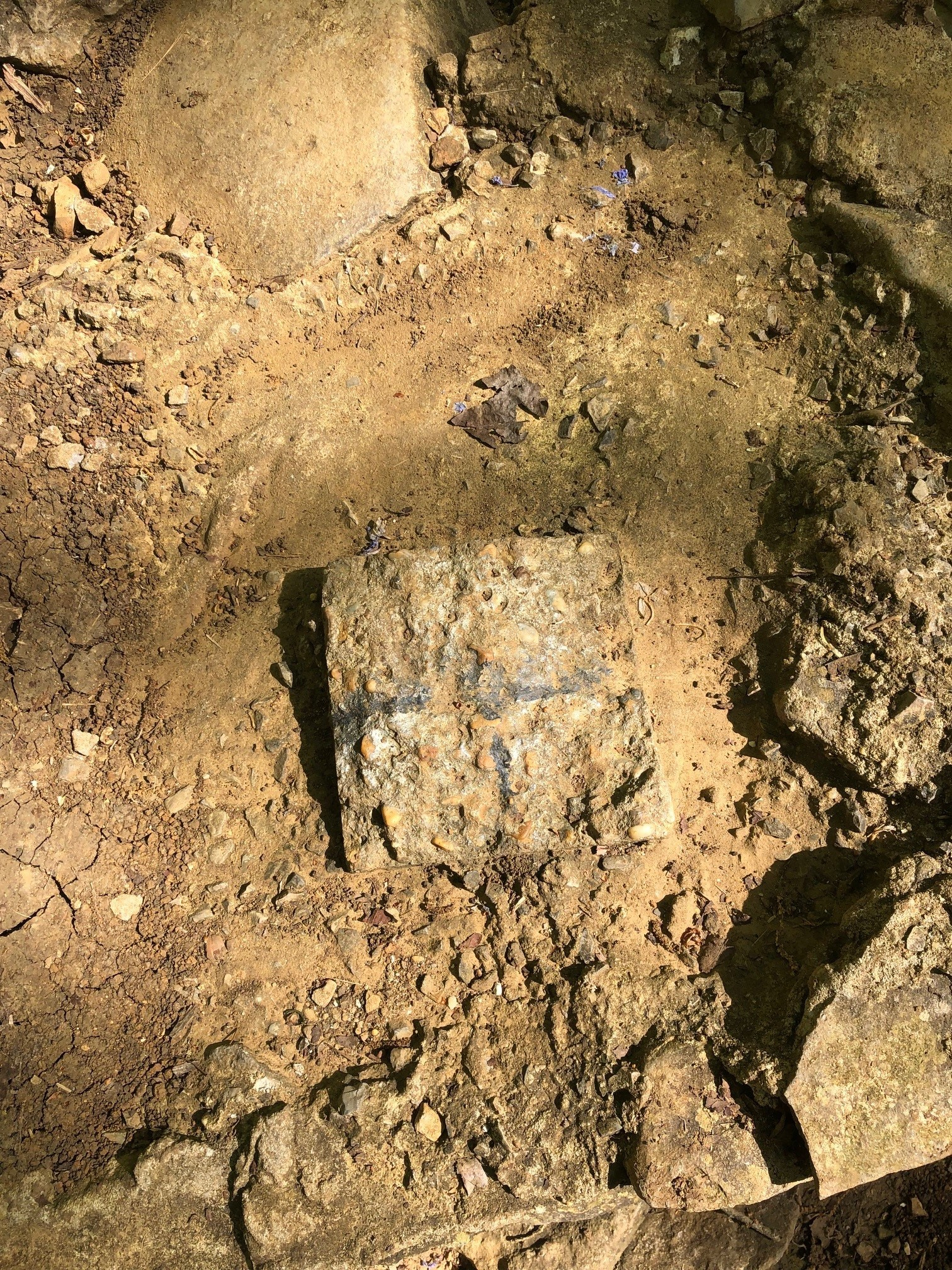
Stone corner monument between Tennessee (northerly 1/2), Alabama (south-westerly 1/4) and Georgia (south-easterly 1/4).

== Location ==
In addition to being the tripoint between Tennessee, Georgia, and Alabama, the marker is also the northwesternmost point in Georgia and the northeasternmost point in Alabama. The portion in Tennessee is on land owned by the Tennessee Valley Authority (TVA), and the Georgia and Alabama portions are on private land. The marker is located in Marion County, Tennessee, Dade County, Georgia, and Jackson County, Alabama, and about 15 miles (24 km) west of downtown Chattanooga, Tennessee. In addition, the portions of the tripoint in Tennessee and Alabama are located within Central Time Zone and the Georgia portion is located in Eastern Time Zone. The tripoint is the western end of a short segment where the boundary between Central and Eastern Time follows the Tennessee-Georgia border.

== History ==
The present location of the tripoint is the result of an erroneous 1818 survey, led by mathematician and University of Georgia professor James Camak, that was commissioned by the state of Georgia to determine the exact location of the border between Georgia and Tennessee after the Alabama Territory had been created by Congress the previous year. The southern border of Tennessee was declared to be located on the 35th parallel north when Tennessee was established as a state by Congress on June 1, 1796, which is approximately 1 mile (1.6 km) north of the present-day tripoint. This would have allowed a small portion of the Tennessee River to be located in Georgia. As a result of this error, Georgia continues to dispute the location of the border with Tennessee.

A second survey was conducted by Camak in 1826, which resulted in little difference from the 1818 survey. During this survey, Camak placed a stone at the tripoint, which became known as the "Camak Stone". This stone disappeared in the fall of 2009, believed to have been stolen. A new marker was placed at the tripoint on March 1, 2011. This marker consists of a short concrete piling with a round brass placard on the top denoting the location of the tripoint and the state boundaries. This marker was stolen during the first quarter of 2021. Currently, the monument consists of a square set stone with the respective state lines denoted without labels. An identification sign placed by the owners of "Paradise Pointe Resort" is nearby.

== See also ==
- List of tripoints of U.S. states
