= Albert Mountain (North Carolina) =

Mountain in North Carolina, United States

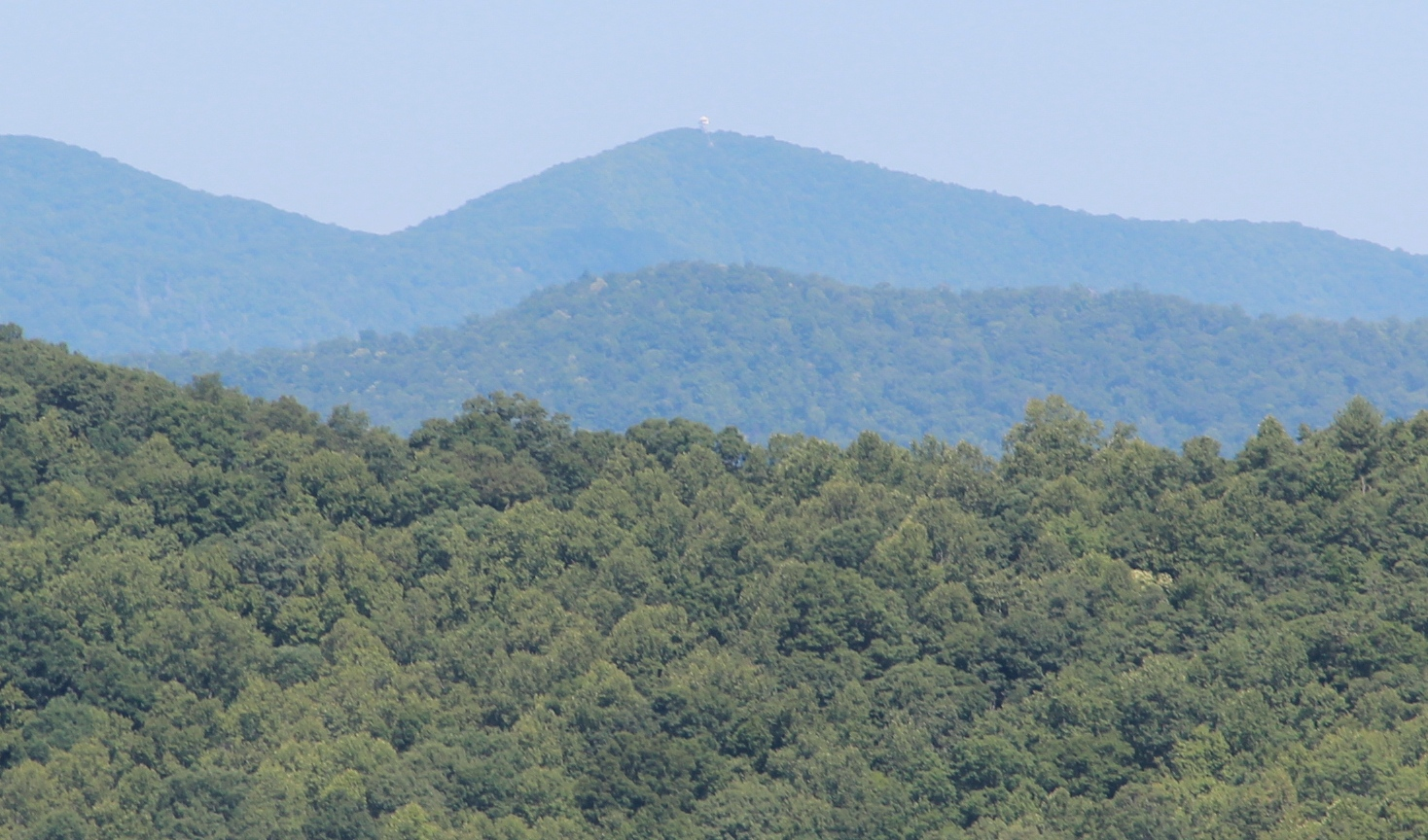
- Albert Mountain viewed from Georgia State Route 246

Highest point
- Elevation: 5,200 ft (1,600 m)
- Prominence: 200 ft (61 m)
- Coordinates: 35°03′08″N 83°28′38″W

Geography
- Location within North Carolina
- Location: Macon County, North Carolina, United States
- Parent range: Appalachian Mountains
- Topo map: USGS Prentiss

Climbing
- Easiest route: Hike

Albert Mountain is a mountain in North Carolina's Nantahala National Forest of the Appalachian Mountains. The Appalachian Trail goes along its summit, which is around 5,200 feet (1,600 m) high. A fire tower offers views of the Blue Ridge and the Little Tennessee River valley.

== Name ==
Albert Mountain is named after Albert Siler (1829-1904), a local resident. Nearby geographic features are also named after Siler's family, such as Siler Bald (not to be confused with Silers Bald), named after Albert's father William Siler and Rufus Morgan Falls, named after Siler's grandson Rufus Morgan.

== Geography ==
Albert Mountain is located inside the Nantahala National Forest in Macon County. The mountain has an elevation of around 5,200 feet (1,600 m). Standing Indian Mountain is located about 3.5 miles (5.6 km) to the south, while the town of Franklin is located about 10 miles (16 km) northeast of the mountain. The summit is also located about 4 miles (6.4 km) north of the Georgia border.

== Fire tower ==
A log lookout cabin has existed on Albert's Mountain since as early as 1942. In 1951, a steel tower was built on Albert Mountain's summit to supplant the abandoned lookout towers on Big Pinnacle Mountain and Standing Indian Mountain and to provide fire detection for the Coweeta Hydrologic Laboratory. The steel tower has a height of 55 feet (17 m). The tower offers views of the Nantahala Mountains and the Little Tennessee River valley. The Great Smoky Mountains and the Great Balsam Mountains are also visible from the fire tower.

== Hiking ==
The 100 mile mark of the Appalachian Trail is at the top of Albert Mountain as the trail passes over the summit. From Bearpen Gap, the hike is about 0.5 miles (0.80 km) up to the summit.

== See also ==
- List of mountains in North Carolina
