= Southern Nantahala Wilderness =

Wilderness area in the United States

Coordinates: 34°59′47″N 83°33′50″W

- IUCN category Ib (wilderness area)
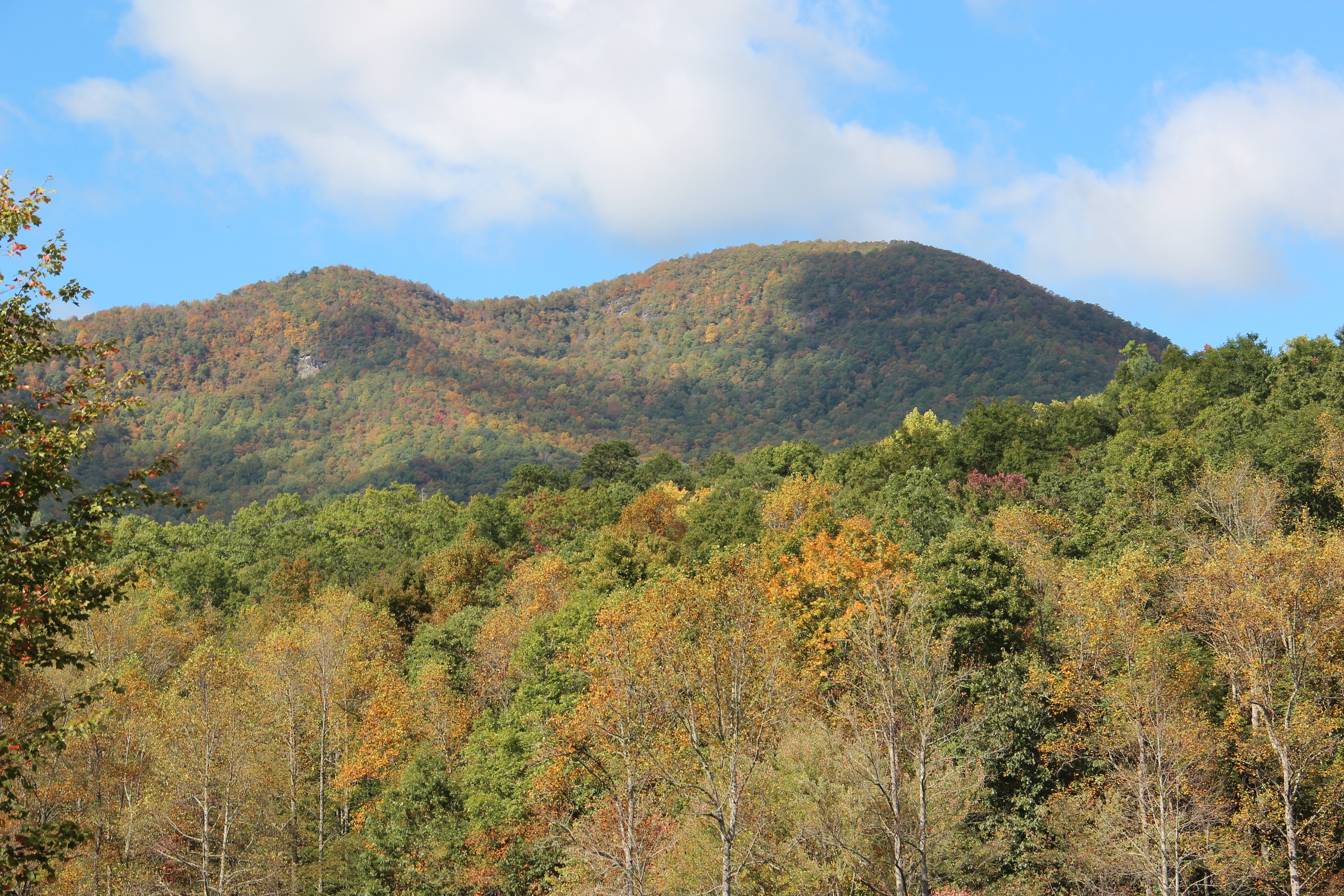
- Hightower Bald

- Location within the United States
- Location: Clay and Macon, North Carolina and Rabun County, Georgia, USA
- Nearest city: Tate City, Georgia
- Area: 23,473 acres (95 km^{2})
- Designation: 1984
- Designated: Wilderness Area
- Governing body: United States Forest Service

The Southern Nantahala Wilderness was designated in 1984 and currently consists of 23,473 acres (94.99 km^{2}). Approximately 11,770 acres (47.6 km^{2}) are located in Georgia in the Chattahoochee National Forest and approximately 11,703 acres (47.36 km^{2}) are located in North Carolina in the Nantahala National Forest. The Wilderness is managed by the United States Forest Service and is part of the National Wilderness Preservation System. The highest elevation in the Southern Nantahala Wilderness is the 5,499-foot (1,676 m) peak of Standing Indian Mountain in North Carolina and the lowest elevation is approximately 2,400 feet (730 m). The Appalachian Trail passes through the Wilderness in both states.

In Georgia, the wilderness is divided into two sections by a corridor on either side of the Tallulah River. The western part of the Wilderness in Georgia includes the portion of the Appalachian Trail that begins at Blue Ridge Gap and climbs over Rocky Knob in Towns County before passing over the eastern flank of Rich Knob in Rabun County and entering North Carolina at Bly Gap. The eastern part of the Wilderness in Georgia includes an area on Coleman River.

In connection with its management of the Wilderness, the Forest Service actively promotes adherence to the Leave No Trace principles.

The wilderness was closed during the 2016 Rock Mountain fire.

== See also ==
- List of U.S. Wilderness Areas
- Wilderness Act
