= Rich Knob =

Mountain in Towns County, Georgia, United States

Coordinates: 34°59′20″N 83°36′07″W

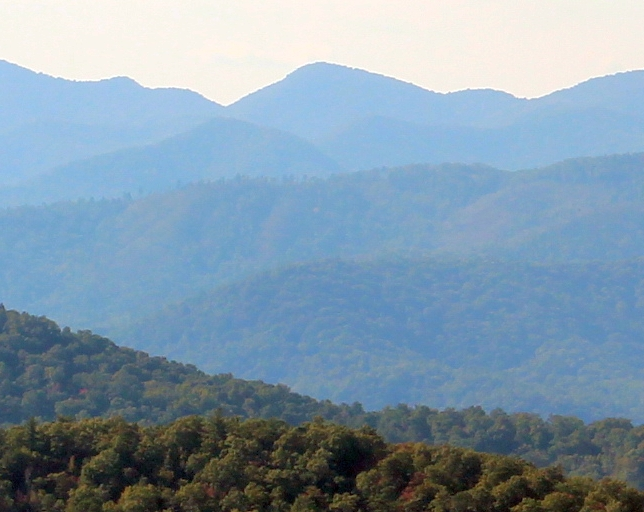
Rich Knob viewed from Black Rock Mountain State Park

Rich Knob, elevation 4,152 feet, is located in Towns County, Georgia. It is part of the Georgia portion of the Southern Nantahala Wilderness and is within the boundaries of the Tallulah Ranger District of the Chattahoochee National Forest. The mountain lies along the Appalachian Trail, which crosses over its eastern flank in Rabun County as it enters North Carolina. Rich Knob also is along the route of The Mountains-To-Sea Trail, East of Rattlesnake Lodge.
