= Tri-state water dispute =

Water use conflict in the southeastern United States

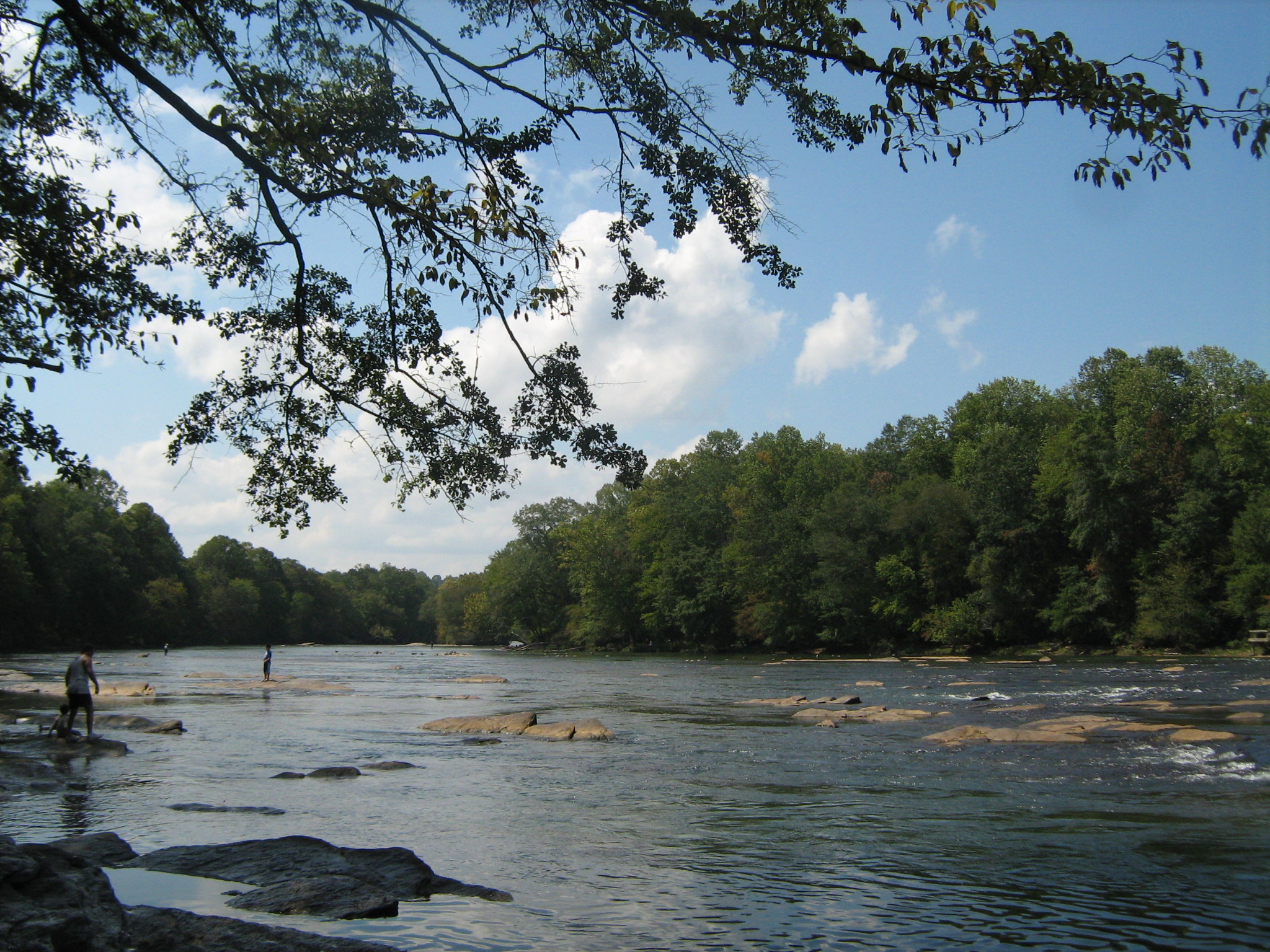
Chattahoochee River in Norcross, Georgia, downstream from Lake Lanier and Buford Dam.

The tri-state water dispute is a 21st-century water-use conflict among the U.S. states of Georgia, Alabama, and Florida over flows in the Apalachicola-Chattahoochee-Flint River Basin and the Alabama-Coosa-Tallapoosa River Basin. The U.S. Army Corps of Engineers has regulated water flow for the entire Chattahoochee River, from Lake Lanier in Forsyth County, Georgia, to Alabama and Florida.

The states filed suit in 1990 in their conflict over the water supply; federal courts have affirmed the Corps' authority to negotiate the conflict. As the Lake Lanier project was authorized by Congress, each of the three states is entitled to an equal portion of the water; the project was never envisioned only to benefit metropolitan Atlanta, the closest large city and one that has developed rapidly since the late 20th century, greatly increasing its water consumption. The water flows are also regulated to support a variety of uses by states downriver, including preservation of marine life under the Endangered Species Act, and support for major seafood industries.

== History ==
=== Buford Dam ===
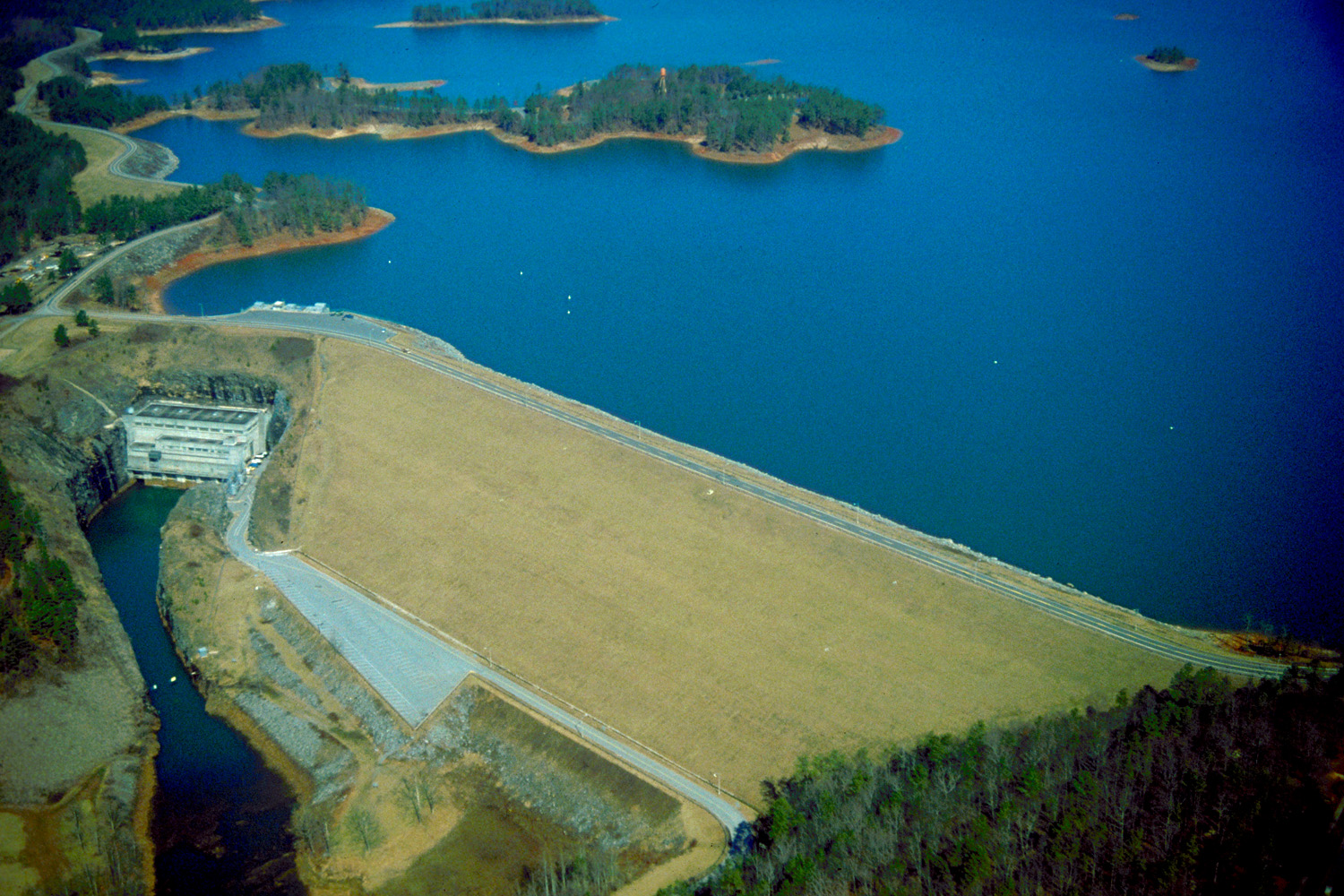
Buford Dam on the Chattahoochee River in northern Georgia. The dam impounds Lake Lanier.

In 1938, the U.S. Army Corps of Engineers produced a report for the U.S. Congress that suggested a list of potential hydropower projects. One of the suggested dams was the Buford Dam on the Chattahoochee River to create a reservoir (now known as Lake Lanier) in north Georgia. In addition to providing hydroelectric power, the dam could provide a steady water supply to Atlanta if, in the future, the city needed additional water resources. The city did not contribute to construction of the dam or reservoir. Additional objectives for the dam included reducing flooding downriver during heavy rains and allowing for easier navigation on related Georgia waterways.

Congress authorized the construction of Buford Dam in 1946, and the dam was completed in 1957. As Atlanta's population continued to grow from the time the dam was built, especially since the late 20th century, its consumption and need for water has grown. At the same time, both Alabama and Florida used the waters from Lake Lanier, which were critical to a variety of uses, including important economic industries. In 1989, the Corps of Engineers released a report concluding that some of the water being used for hydroelectric power at Buford Dam should, instead, be used to supply Atlanta with water for human consumption.

=== Legal action ===
As a result of the COE's recommendation, Alabama filed a lawsuit in 1990 against Georgia and the Army Corps of Engineers, followed by the state of Florida later that year. Alabama challenged the Corps' recommendation of the reallocation of the water supply, arguing that the Corps' recommendation had favored Georgia's interests and had ignored the National Environmental Policy Act (NEPA) of 1969 and the impact of its recommendation on the environment. In its suit, Florida cited the critical effect of the dam's operations on endangered species and NEPA violations by the Corps of Engineers. Alabama and Florida later filed amended briefs to the 1990 Alabama suit, stating that an endangered aquatic species was being threatened due to a decrease of water levels downriver.

After the 1990 lawsuit was filed in Alabama, the parties decided to suspend legal procedures in an effort to reach an agreement suitable to all three states. After arbitration by a federal judge from Minnesota, in 1997, the parties created two compacts: the Apalachicola-Chattahoochee-Flint (ACF) between Alabama, Florida, and Georgia; and the Alabama-Coosa-Tallapoosa (ACT) between Alabama and Georgia. Georgia had sued the Corps for wrongfully prohibiting Lake Lanier to be used for water consumption for metropolitan Atlanta, but a federal judge ruled that the project had not been authorized for that purpose.

During negotiation of the 1997 compacts, Georgia also entered into negotiations with the Corps to allow part of Lake Lanier to be used for water consumption. In 2004, both Alabama and Florida challenged these agreements due to the preeminence of the suit filed by Alabama in 1990. The 1997 compacts, however, were not successful; they were allowed to expire in 2003 and 2004, for the ACF and the ACT, respectively.

The states could not agree on minimum flow requirements, general operation standards, and consumption caps. Georgia argued that if the flow standards are met, then minimum flow requirements are unnecessary. Georgia and the Corps of Engineers reached an agreement to reduce the state's water usage from Lake Lanier, but in 2008, the U.S. Court of Appeals for the District of Columbia ruled that this type of change in the agreement required Congressional approval and could not be made by the USACE. At various times, the governors of each of the three states have met, but these meetings have resulted only in deadline extensions for agreement. When U.S. Interior Secretary Ken Salazar visited Georgia in 2009, he said that he would not force the states into any agreement, but he would help them come to an agreement.

U.S. District Judge Paul Magnuson, brought in as a neutral arbiter, ruled in July 2009 that metropolitan Atlanta would be prohibited from taking water out of Lake Lanier for a three-year negotiation period to begin among the states of Georgia, Alabama, and Florida. In October 2009, Judge Magnuson ruled against Georgia in response to an appeal by the state on the July ruling.

In June 2011 the Eleventh Circuit Court of Appeals reversed the 2009 district court decision and confirmed the USACE's authority to regulate Lake Lanier for Atlanta's water supply. The Corps responded in June 2012 with plans for further analysis and evaluation of proposals from the three states.

In 2013, Florida filed an original action against Georgia in the Supreme Court of the United States, requesting equitable apportionment of waters in the ACF Basin. On November 3, 2014, the Supreme Court granted Florida leave to file the complaint, and the case went before a special master before being argued on January 8, 2018. On June 27, 2018, the case was remanded and in the following month, a new special master was appointed. The case was argued again on February 22, 2021 and on April 1, the court unanimously ruled to dismiss the case.

In April 2017, Alabama and environmental groups sued the Army Corps of Engineers to challenge their recently adopted Master Water Control Manual and Environmental Impact Statement for the ACF Basin. The manual details Corps operations of reservoirs in the basin, including how operations will accommodate the water supply demand of Metro Atlanta through 2050. Environmental groups argued that the plan would hold too much water in reserve, reducing environmental flows downriver. In August 2021, U.S. District Court Judge Thomas Thrash dismissed the case, ruling that the Corps was within its powers to make a water supply assurance to Metro Atlanta and had satisfactorily considered the needs of Alabama and Florida.

== Positions ==
=== Georgia ===
Georgia has indicated that the need for fresh water to use for human consumption is its primary concern in the issue. Experts in the metro Atlanta area assert that the people of metro Atlanta require and can safely extract 705 million gallons (2.67 Gl) of fresh water per day from a number of reservoirs and water basins around northern Georgia until the year 2030. Georgia states the water from Lake Allatoona and the Etowah River in North Georgia could sustain the water needs of the metro Atlanta area. Georgia's main concern is whether or not they have the capability to supply over 5.6 million people in the metro Atlanta area with potable water.

Because of Georgia's need to supply a booming population with safe, usable water, Georgia's circumstance is unique to the three states involved. The interstate water dispute becomes an intrastate issue for Georgia because of the major quantities of water needed for supporting population growth in the metro Atlanta. The growth of Atlanta has also increased water consumption for maintaining lawns and golf courses, which other parties to the rivers do not want to support. Lake Lanier's downstream users in Georgia maintain that an increase in the water consumption of metro Atlanta results in a decrease of available water for users in south Georgia. Farmers in Southwest Georgia and homeowners on West Point Lake perceive metro Atlanta as competition for water.

For the past two decades, Georgia's leadership has failed to produce significant agreements with Alabama and Florida. Many people blame the leaders of the state for this failure. The old course of "Conflict, Conceal, and Capture" has not resulted in any progress. In December 2009 Governor Sonny Perdue's Water Contingency Planning Task Force recommended greater water conservation in the Atlanta region and further negotiation regarding the reallocation of portions of Lake Lanier to supply the needs of metro Atlanta. Nathan Deal, Governor of Georgia in 2011, wanted to resolve the conflict with Alabama by finding new solutions to Atlanta's need for water.

=== Alabama ===
Alabama uses water of the ACF River Basin for a variety of purposes, including agriculture, industry, fisheries, recreation, preservation of habitats and biodiversity, power generation, navigation, and water quality, all of which may be limited by Atlanta's growing usage. Alabama's goals during the ACF negotiations have been to ensure adequate water levels of the Chattahoochee River through the Alabama cities of Phenix City and Columbia, perpetuation of waste assimilation and water use permits in the middle regions of the Chattahoochee River, continuation of the Corps' projects such as hydropower and flood control, preservation of water levels of Alabama's West Point Lake and Lake Eufaula, and ensuring that neither current or future plans adversely affect the stated goals. During the drought of 2007, the state of Georgia had statewide water restrictions, but the city of Phenix City, Alabama failed to enact water restrictions on their customers.

During the early part of the process, Alabama was, compared to Georgia and Florida, somewhat ill-equipped to address some of the arguments presented by Florida and Georgia. The state did not pass a comprehensive Water Resources Act until 1993, more than two years after their lawsuit was filed against the Corps. The newly created Office of Water Resources was not fully staffed until 1997. But it has worked to catch up.

=== Florida ===
As another downstream user of the ACF River Basin, Florida wants and needs enough freshwater to reach the Apalachicola Bay of Northwestern Florida to maintain shrimping and other seafood industries, which provide significant income for the state. These industries are vital to the Apalachicola Bay area and generate millions of dollars for the region, while providing thousands of jobs. Unlike Georgia, where the issue over the use of freshwater is based on supplying a growing human population with potable water, Florida is faced with economic challenges and severe losses if the water from upriver is diminished.

== Policy issues ==
=== Stakeholders ===
As all three states have portions of the ACF river basin, ACT river basin, or both within their borders, Georgia, Alabama, and Florida are involved in the issue. The U.S. Army Corps of Engineers constructed Lake Lanier under authorization and appropriations by Congress, and controls its flow of water for multiple purposes, so it is involved in the dispute.

Concerned with the environmental effects on the two river basins, the Tri-State Conservation Coalition—a league of more than 45 organizations, including the Alabama Rivers Alliance, Southern Environmental Law Center, American Rivers, Lake Watch of Lake Martin, and Upper Chattahoochee Riverkeeper—is involved with the goal of preserving the water quality and other environmental factors.

=== Environmental impact ===
Alabama is concerned about environmental effects under drought, if the waters of the ACF and the ACT river basins are diminished to use Lake Lanier to supply water for Atlanta's consumption. These two river basins are the habitat for countless numbers of fish and other aquatic life, which need a proper amount of water to thrive.

If the water levels fall too low, such aquatic species may suffer. Endangered species of both sturgeon and mussel live in the basins, and reducing the water supply to the basins would put these endangered species at risk. NEPA requires submission of an environmental impact statement (EIS) before any action with potentially major environmental effects can take place. No EIS has been published for changes to allocation of water from Lake Lanier, indicating the full environmental impact has not been assessed. Draft Programmatic EISs for the two basins were published in 1999, but were never formalized. No Record of Decision (ROD) was ever published.

Florida also has major environmental issues related to the flow in the ACF basin. The Apalachicola Bay provides 35 percent of the freshwater flow to the eastern Gulf of Mexico, and it is vital to the richly productive estuaries in this region. The key to the estuary is the fluctuation in salinity levels produced by the ACF's freshwater flow. A reduced flow of fresh water into these estuaries would result in higher salinity levels, that could endanger the marine life, including that supporting major seafood industries.

== See also ==
- Tennessee–Georgia water dispute
- Water wars in Florida
