= Tate City, Georgia =

Unincorporated community in Georgia, U.S.

- Unincorporated community Census-designated place
- Location within Georgia Location within the United States
- Coordinates: 34°58′43.69″N 83°33′14.58″W
- Country: United States
- State: Georgia
- County: Towns

Area
  - Total: 1.03 sq mi (2.7 km^{2})
  - Land: 1.051 sq mi (2.72 km^{2})
  - Water: 0.021 sq mi (0.054 km^{2})
- Elevation: 2,497 ft (761 m)
- Time zone: UTC-5 (Eastern (EST))
  - Summer (DST): UTC-4 (EDT)
- GNIS feature ID: 2587049

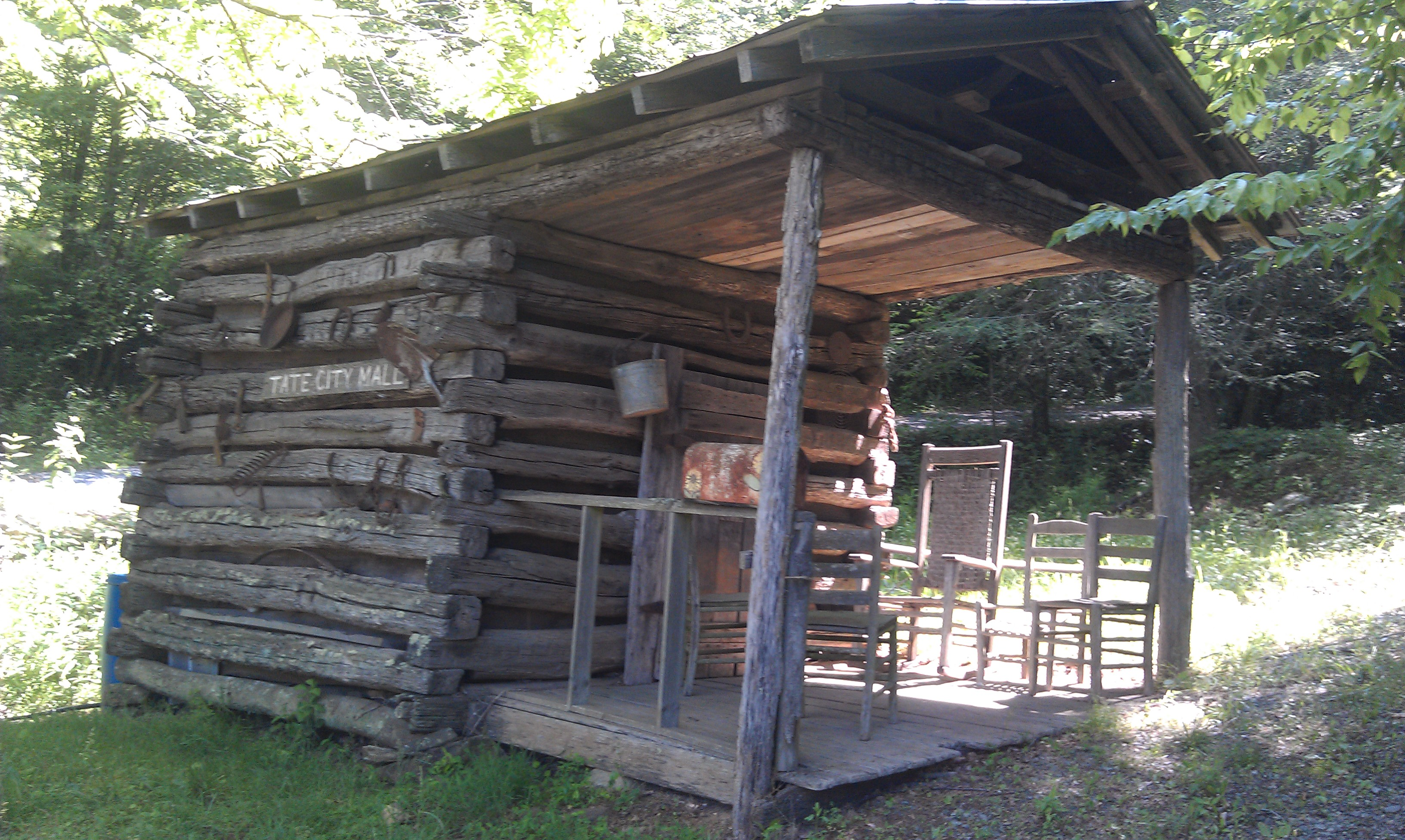
Antique shed, which used to be a pig pen, in Tate City, Georgia in Towns County, with sign stating Tate City Mall

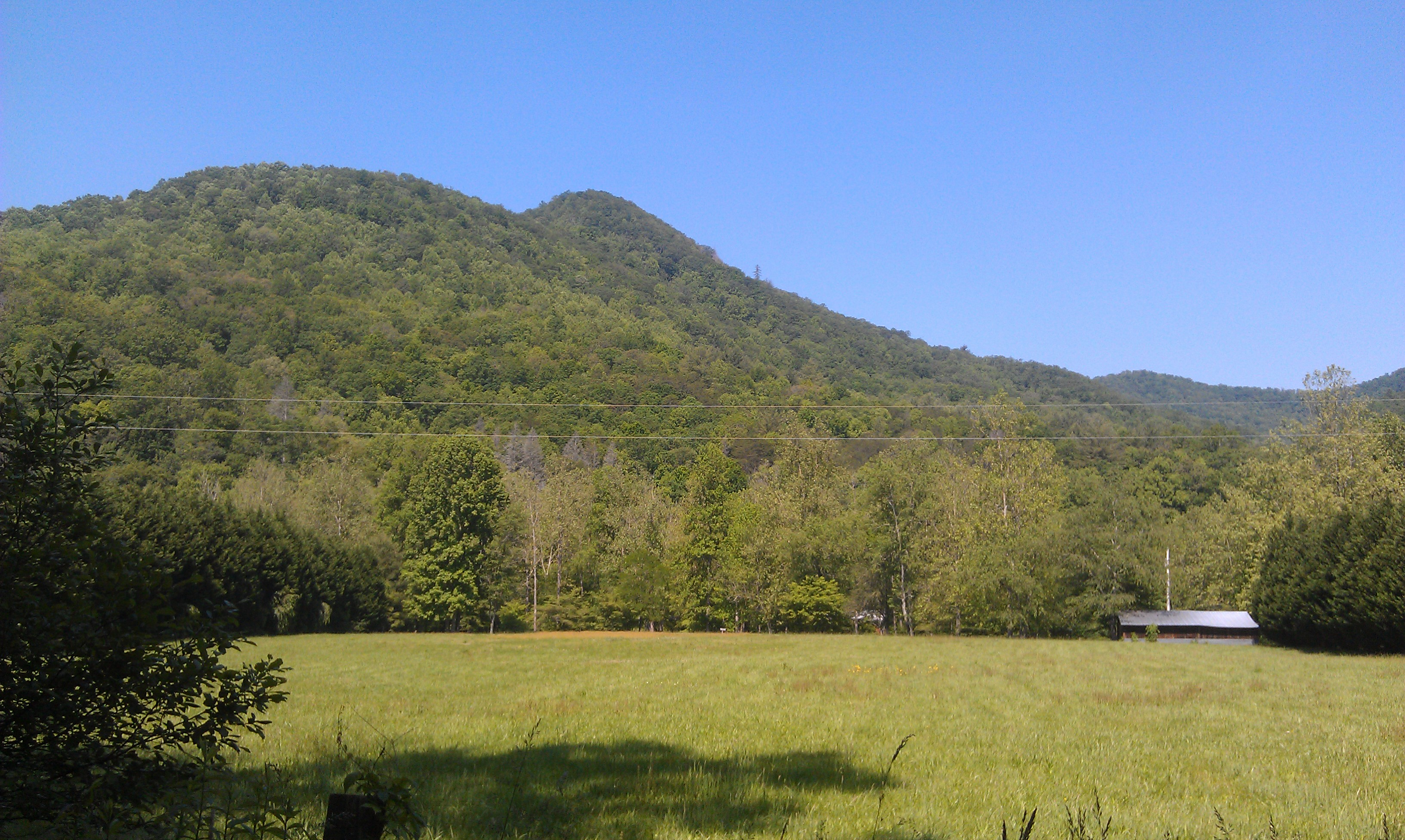
View from Tate City looking toward the West

Tate City is an unincorporated community and census-designated place in Towns County, Georgia, United States. It was founded as a mining and logging community. The community was named after one Mr. Tate, a businessperson in the local lumber industry. As of the 2020 census, Tate City had a population of 27.

Tate City sits in a scenic valley along the upper Tallulah River, just south of the Georgia-North Carolina border. The community is flanked by various peaks of the Blue Ridge and Nantahala Mountains, including 4568-foot Hightower Bald, 4640-ft. Dicks Knob, and 5499-ft. Standing Indian Mountain.

== Demographics ==
Historical population
| Census | Pop. | Note | %± |
|---|---|---|---|
| 2010 | 16 | | — |
| 2020 | 27 | | 68.8% |
U.S. Decennial Census; 2020

Tate City first appeared as a CDP in the 2010 United States census.

Tate City, Georgia CDP – Racial and ethnic composition Note: the US Census treats Hispanic/Latino as an ethnic category. This table excludes Latinos from the racial categories and assigns them to a separate category. Hispanics/Latinos may be of any race.
| Race / Ethnicity (NH = Non-Hispanic) | Pop 2010 | Pop 2020 | % 2010 | % 2020 |
|---|---|---|---|---|
| White alone (NH) | 16 | 24 | 100.00% | 88.89% |
| Black or African American alone (NH) | 0 | 0 | 0.00% | 0.00% |
| Native American or Alaska Native alone (NH) | 0 | 0 | 0.00% | 0.00% |
| Asian alone (NH) | 0 | 0 | 0.00% | 0.00% |
| Pacific Islander alone (NH) | 0 | 0 | 0.00% | 0.00% |
| Other race alone (NH) | 0 | 0 | 0.00% | 0.00% |
| Mixed race or Multiracial (NH) | 0 | 1 | 0.00% | 3.70% |
| Hispanic or Latino (any race) | 0 | 2 | 0.00% | 7.41% |
| Total | 16 | 27 | 100.00% | 100.00% |
