= Tennessee–Georgia water dispute =

Territorial dispute between the U.S. states of Tennessee and Georgia

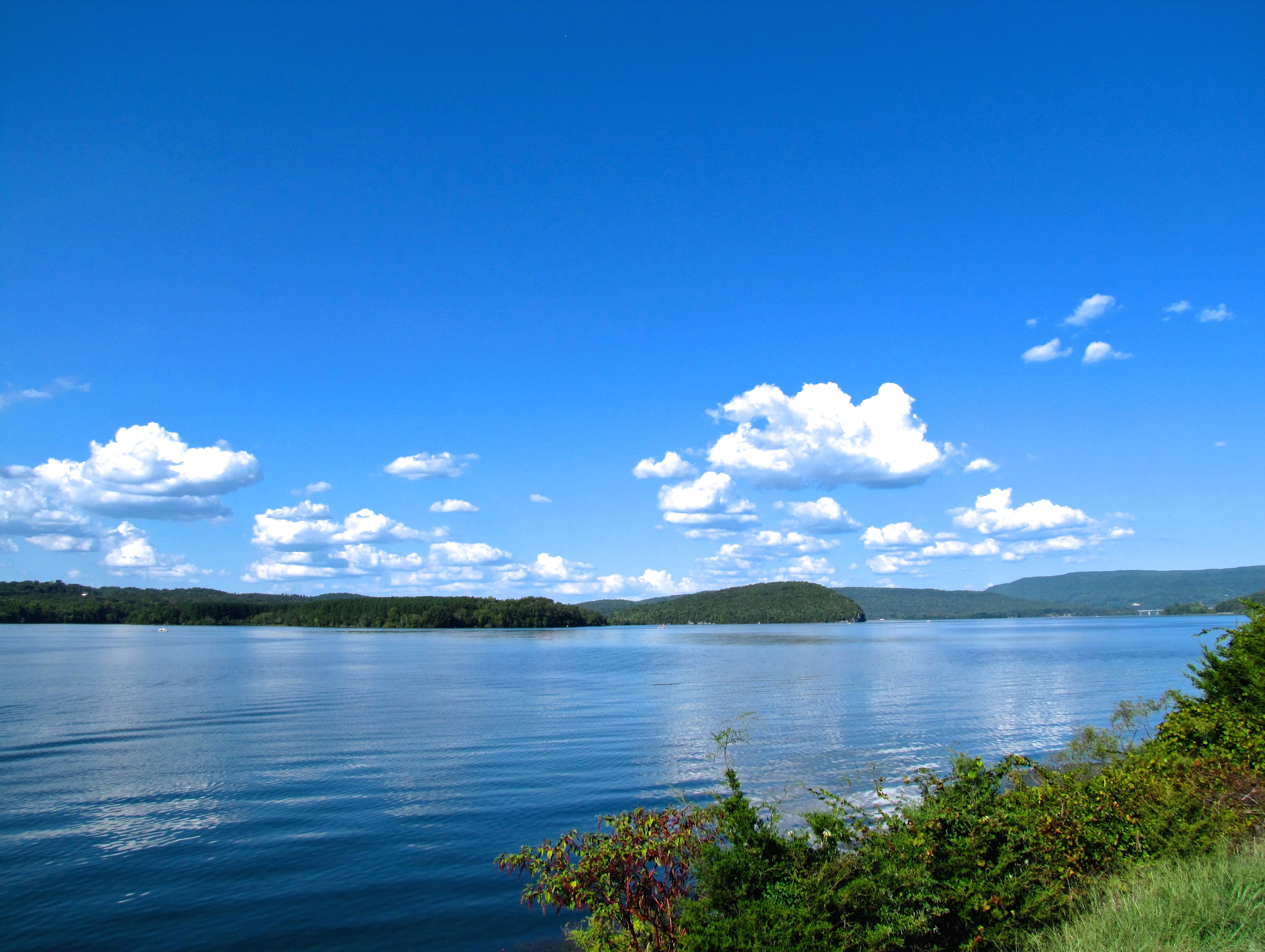
Nickajack Lake along Tennessee State Route 156 in Marion County. This photo was taken approximately 1/2 mile (0.80 km) south of the 35th parallel north, which was originally defined by Congress to be the southern border of Tennessee.

The Tennessee–Georgia water dispute is an ongoing territorial dispute between the U.S. States of Tennessee and Georgia about whether or not the border between the two states should have been located farther north, allowing a small portion of the Tennessee River to be located in Georgia. The dispute has existed since the 19th century, but was further fueled by the increase in demand for water due to the rapid growth of the Atlanta metropolitan area which began in the latter 20th century.

== Background ==
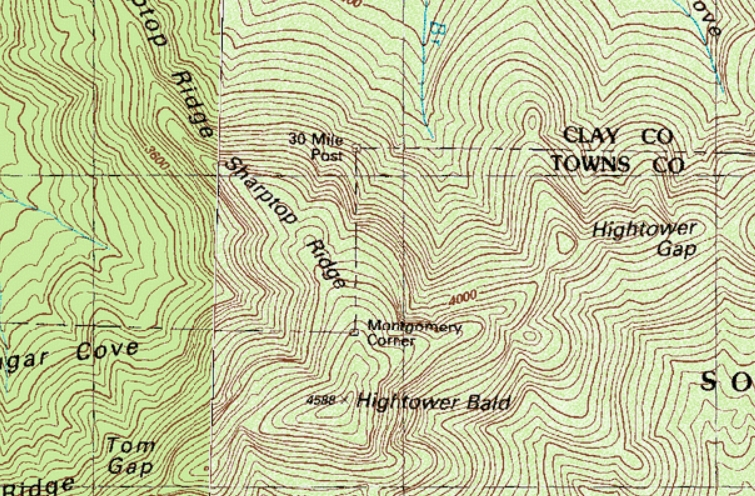
Map showing the Georgia-North Carolina border running in a north–south direction on the slopes of Hightower Bald

The Tennessee River, the largest tributary of the Ohio River, is a 652 miles (1,049 km) long river in the Southeastern United States. The river drains the Tennessee Valley watershed, and is located within four states: Tennessee, Alabama, Mississippi, and Kentucky. The river begins in East Tennessee at the confluence of the Holston and French Broad rivers just north of Knoxville, and runs south through Chattanooga, whose city limits touch the Tennessee–Georgia border in some places. It then runs into Alabama south of Nickajack Dam less than one mile from the tripoint where Tennessee, Georgia, and Alabama meet. The river in Tennessee reaches as close as 200 feet (61 m) from the Georgia state line in Marion County.

The southern border of Tennessee was declared to be located on the 35th parallel north when Tennessee was established as a state by Congress on June 1, 1796. This would have allowed a small portion of the river to be located within Georgia. Georgia, one of the original Thirteen Colonies, had become a state on January 2, 1788, but did not sell its western territory to the Federal government until 1802, when the selling agreement declared Georgia's western border to be "a line from the great bend of the Chattahoochee River and thence in a direct line [north] to Nickajack [an Indian settlement] on the Tennessee River... running up the said Tennessee River and along the Western Bank thereof to the Southern Boundary line of the State of Tennessee." The land that Nickajack was located on is now part of Nickajack Lake, a reservoir created by the Tennessee Valley Authority. The boundary between Tennessee and Georgia, however, was not surveyed until after the Alabama Territory was created on December 10, 1817. Shortly thereafter both Tennessee and Georgia's legislatures agreed to conduct a survey of their border. Georgia appointed mathematician and University of Georgia professor James Camak as part of the surveying team. The survey took place in 1818, and both teams incorrectly determined the 35th parallel north to be 1 mile (1.6 km) south of its actual location. Tennessee's 1819 code describes Nickajack as being located "one mile and twenty-eight poles due south from the south bank of the Tennessee River as found by mathematician James Camak." The actual 35th parallel north crosses the Tennessee River near present-day Haletown, Tennessee. The equipment the surveyors used was also reportedly outdated, and one of the Georgia surveyors reportedly requested that the governor provide them with more modern equipment. The two teams started at Georgia's northwestern corner and continued eastward placing a marker where they believed the tripoint of Georgia, Tennessee, and North Carolina was located, and stopped near Hightower Bald in the Blue Ridge Mountains, approximately 35 miles (56 km) west of the northeastern corner of Georgia. This survey was later ratified by Tennessee's legislature, but not Georgia's. In 1819, the Georgia legislature asked the North Carolina legislature to appoint a surveying team to meet with their team and survey the rest of the boundary. The teams met at Ellicott's Rock, located along the Chattooga River, which was constructed by astronomer and surveyor Andrew Ellicott in 1811, marking what he determined to be the tripoint of Georgia, North Carolina, and South Carolina, and continued westward until they reached the location where the Georgia and Tennessee teams had stopped surveying the boundary the year before. At this point, the termination of the line surveyed the year before was about 1/2 mile (0.80 km) north. Instead of attempting to correct the mistake from the year before, the teams instead marked a line directly southward to connect the two lines, an offset that came to be known as Montgomery's Corner after Hugh Montgomery, one of the surveyors on the Georgia team.

In 1826, Georgia and Alabama, which had become a state in 1819, agreed to survey their land border. The survey was conducted between where the border splits off from the Chattahoochee River a few miles north of present-day West Point, Georgia and the river continues into Georgia, and the tri-point of Georgia, Alabama, and Tennessee. Georgia again appointed Camak, who described the location of the Nickajack settlement in the survey documents as "about one quarter of a mile north of the Georgia–Tennessee boundary as surveyed in 1818." Camak again expressed a suspicion that his instruments were outdated and inaccurate, but endorsed the results of the survey, believing them to be accurate.

== Disputes ==
Georgia has attempted to correct what they have believed to be an error on multiple occasions, reportedly since the early 19th century. According to the Atlanta Journal-Constitution, the Georgia General Assembly reportedly first tried to correct this perceived error in 1887. According to a 2008 publication in the Tennessee Bar Journal, a publication of the Tennessee Bar Association, Georgia attempted to "resolve the dispute" in the 1890s, 1905, 1915, 1922, 1941, 1947 and 1971 by moving the border north to the actual 35th parallel north, allowing them access to the Tennessee River in Nickajack Lake.

The issue of water access became a much larger problem in the later 20th century, when the Atlanta metropolitan area began to grow rapidly, which continues in the present. In 2008, as a result of a serious drought and resulting water shortage, the Georgia General Assembly passed a resolution directing the governor to pursue its claim in the United States Supreme Court. The case was never appealed to the Supreme Court, but on March 14, 2008, a Chattanooga attorney familiar with case law on border disputes said the U.S. Supreme Court generally will maintain the original borders between states and avoid stepping into border disputes, preferring the two sides work out their disputes on their own.

In 2013 the Georgia Senate approved House Resolution 4, which states that if Tennessee declines to settle the dispute with them, the dispute will be handed over to the attorney general, who will take Tennessee before the Supreme Court to settle the issue once and for all. The resolution, reportedly the tenth attempt to change the border by Georgia, also declared that Georgia, not Tennessee, controls the land to the north. The dispute was revisited again by the legislature in 2018. In 2019, the Georgia General Assembly passed a resolution creating a committee to negotiate with elected officials in Tennessee and North Carolina about changing the border. The resolution also authorizes other actions, such as an effort to gain access to Tennessee River water without changing the border. The resolution was vetoed by governor Brian Kemp.

Georgia has accused Tennessee on multiple occasions of unwillingness to cooperate. Tennessee lawmakers have stated on multiple occasions that they will not agree to such a resolution, and that Georgia has no right to Tennessee water. In 2008, then-Chattanooga mayor Ron Littlefield told The New York Times when discussing the resolution sponsored by Georgia Senator David J. Shafer, "I saw him [Shafer] grumbling that we didn’t seem to be taking it seriously. Well, I’m sorry, we’re not." That same year, then-governor Phil Bredesen asked an Associated Press reporter, "This is a joke, right?" In 2013, when the dispute was renewed, then-governor Bill Haslam reported through a spokesman that he was opposed to any efforts by Georgia to change the border. In 2019, Tennessee State Senator Todd Gardenhire sarcastically told a group that Georgia could have access to "all the water they want" from the Tennessee River as long as the intake is located across the river from a sewage treatment plant at Moccasin Bend in Chattanooga.

Tennessee lawmakers have also accused Georgia of failing to control the rapid growth of the Atlanta metropolitan area, the primary driver of the increased demand for water in Georgia. Others claim that Georgia should work toward better water conservation efforts, citing a 2013 report by the Tennessee American Water Company that determined the per-capita water use in Chattanooga to be 95 gallons per day (360 L per day), and 151 gallons per day in Atlanta (572 L per day), despite watering bans in the summer and public appeals for better conservation. Georgia has also been engaged in a water use dispute with Alabama and Florida, who claim that Georgia's use of water from rivers that flow into Alabama and Florida is harmful to their economies. Tennessee lawmakers insist that allowing Georgia access to the Tennessee River would lead to problems similar to those that have led to the disputes with Alabama and Florida.

The dispute has resulted in several comical political acts on multiple occasions. In 2008, Littlefield sent a truckload of bottled water and a coonskin cap to the Georgia General Assembly, saying it was "better to offer a cool, wet kiss of friendship rather than face a hot, angry legislator gone mad with thirst." Georgia legislators responded that they were happy to accept the mayor's down payment. In 2013, a Georgia lobbyist hit a golf ball from the Georgia–Tennessee border into Nickajack Lake, referring to the area as "Occupied Georgia."

== See also ==
- Tri-state water dispute
- List of territorial disputes
