= Shooting Creek Bald =

Mountain in Georgia, United States

Coordinates: 34.9803°N 83.6293°W

Shooting Creek Bald is a summit in the U.S. state of Georgia. The elevation is 4,318 feet (1,316 m).

This bald was named after Shooting Creek, in North Carolina.
