= Standing Indian Mountain =

Mountain in North Carolina, United States

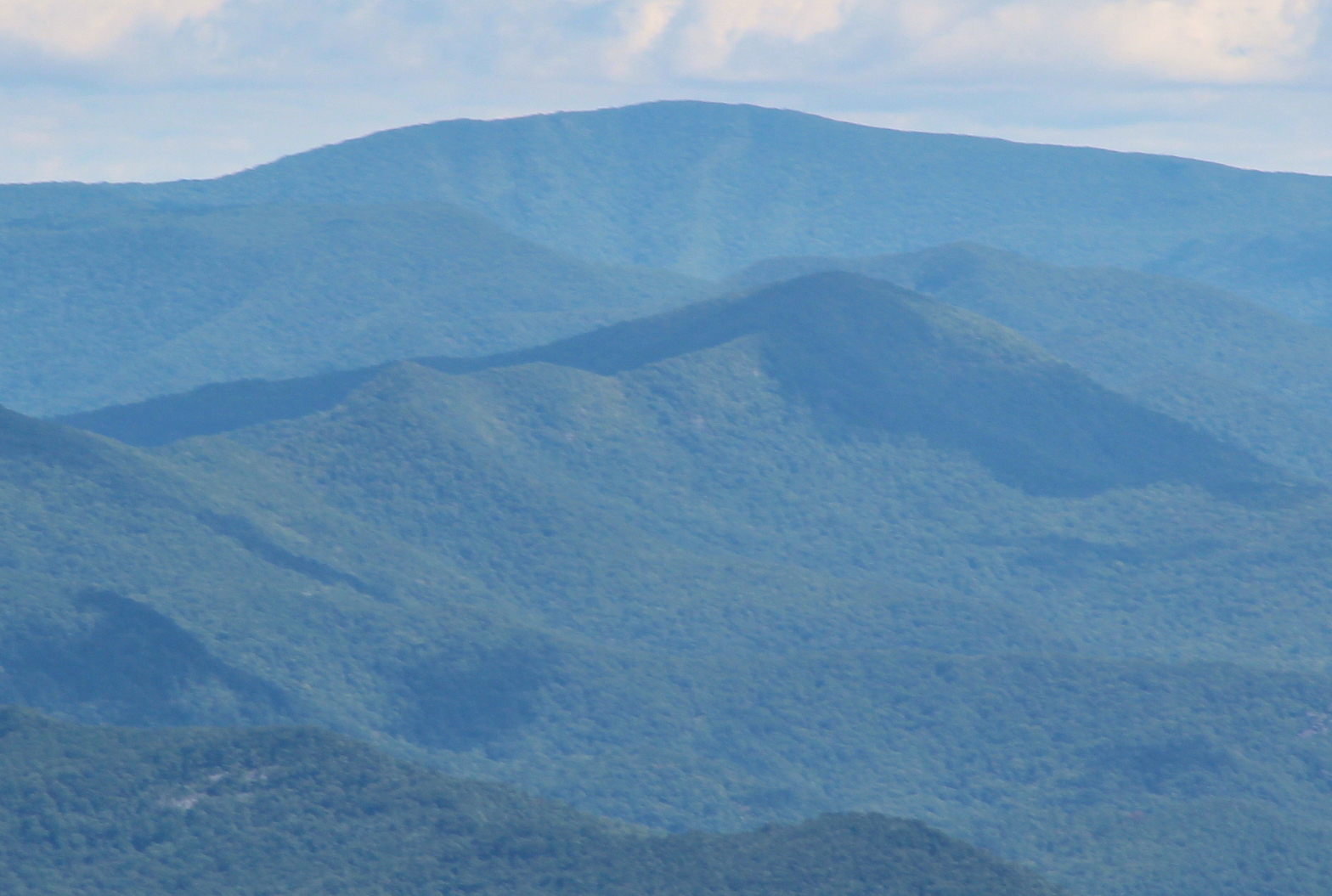
- Standing Indian Mountain viewed from Brasstown Bald

Highest point
- Elevation: 5,499 ft (1,676 m)
- Prominence: 2,819 ft (859 m)
- Coordinates: 35°02′08″N 83°32′17″W

Geography
- Location within North Carolina
- Location: Clay County and Macon County, North Carolina, United States
- Parent range: Appalachian Mountains
- Topo map: USGS Rainbow Springs

Climbing
- Easiest route: Hike

Standing Indian Mountain, elevation 5,499 feet (1,676 m), is part of the North Carolina portion of the Southern Nantahala Wilderness within the boundaries of the Nantahala National Forest. The mountain lies along the Appalachian Trail and is the highest point along the Nantahala River.

== Name ==
The Cherokee name for Standing Indian Mountain is Yunwitsule-nunyi, which translates to "where the man stood." According to Cherokee mythology, Standing Indian Mountain is home to the remains of a Cherokee warrior. This warrior had been sent to the mountaintop to keep a lookout for a winged monster. The monster, whose lair was located on Standing Indian Mountain, would swoop in from the skies and steal children. Upon discovering the location of the monster's lair, the Cherokee prayed to the Great Spirit for assistance. The prayers were answered when the Great Spirit destroyed the monster and its lair with thunder and lightning. The lightning frightened the warrior and the warrior tried to abandon his post. Because the warrior abandoned his post, he was turned into stone for his cowardice.

== Geography ==
Standing Indian Mountain is located inside the Southern Nantahala Wilderness. The mountain has an elevation of 5,499 feet (1,676 m). Albert Mountain is located about 3.5 miles (5.6 km) to the north, while the city of Dillard, Georgia is located about 10 miles (16 km) southeast of the mountain. The summit is also located about 3 miles (4.8 km) north of the Georgia border.

== Hiking ==
The Appalachian Trail passes over Standing Indian Mountain's summit. From the Deep Gap parking area, it is a 2.5 miles (4.0 km) hike up the Appalachian Trail to the summit. From the Standing Indian Campground, it is a 4.1 miles (6.6 km) hike up the Lower Ridge Trail and a 0.1 miles (0.16 km) hike up the Appalachian Trail for a total hike of 4.2 miles (6.8 km).

== See also ==
- List of mountains in North Carolina
