= 2016 Southeastern United States wildfires =

Series of wildfires in the Southeastern U.S.

Southeastern United States wildfires of 2016
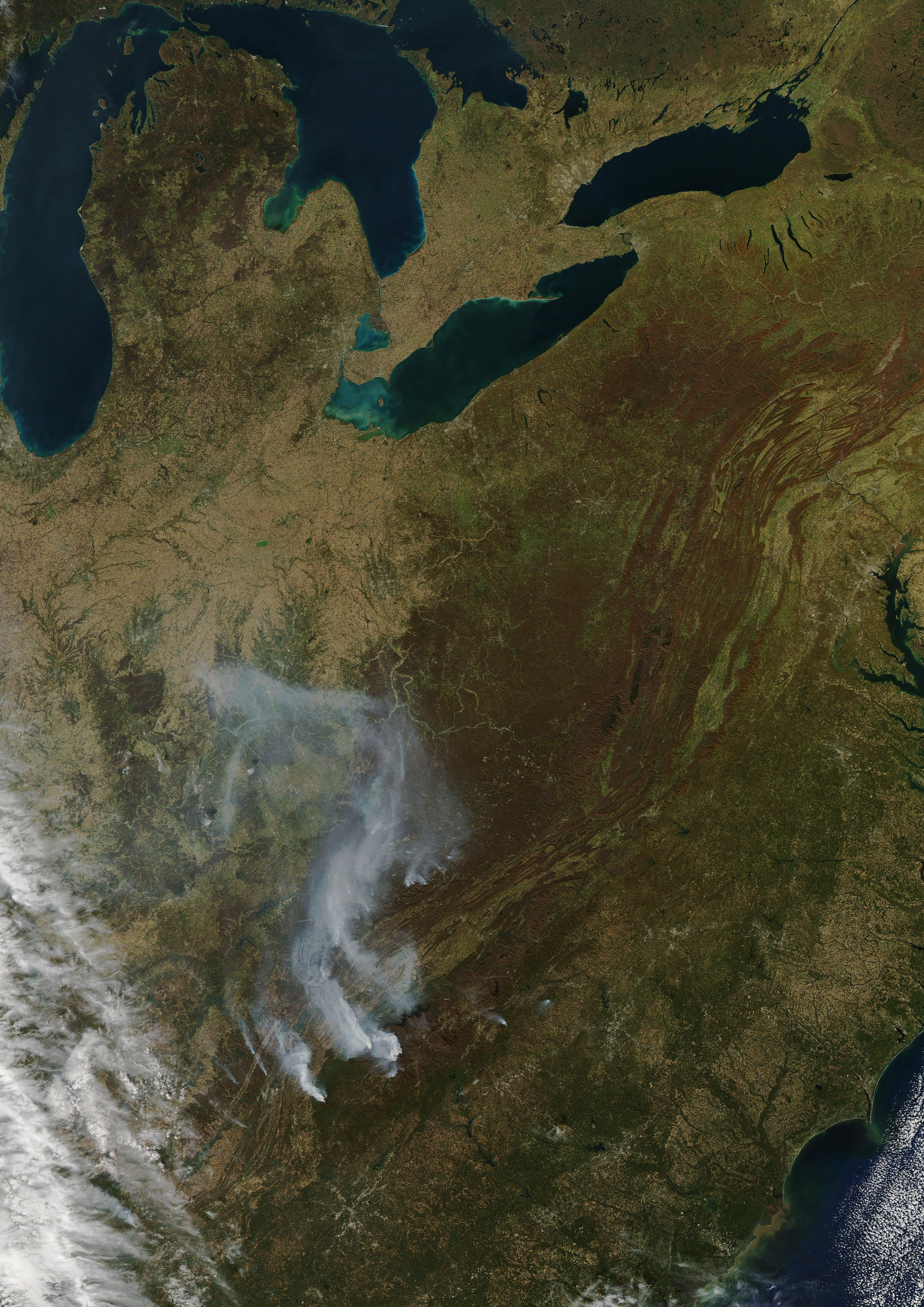
- Satellite photo taken on November 7, 2016, showing wildfires burning in the U.S. states of Georgia, North Carolina, Tennessee, and Kentucky.
- Date: October 23, 2016 – December 9, 2016; (EDT)
- Location: Alabama; Georgia; North Carolina; South Carolina; Tennessee

Statistics
- Burned area: At least 80,000 acres (32,000 ha)

Impacts
- Deaths: 14
- Injuries: ~74
- Structures destroyed: 2,000+

Ignition
- Cause: Several fires suspected to have been caused by arson

The 2016 Southeastern United States wildfires were a series of wildfires in the Southeastern United States in October and November 2016. The U.S. Forest Service reported tracking 33 wildfires that had burned about 90,000 acres (36,000 ha).

== Context ==
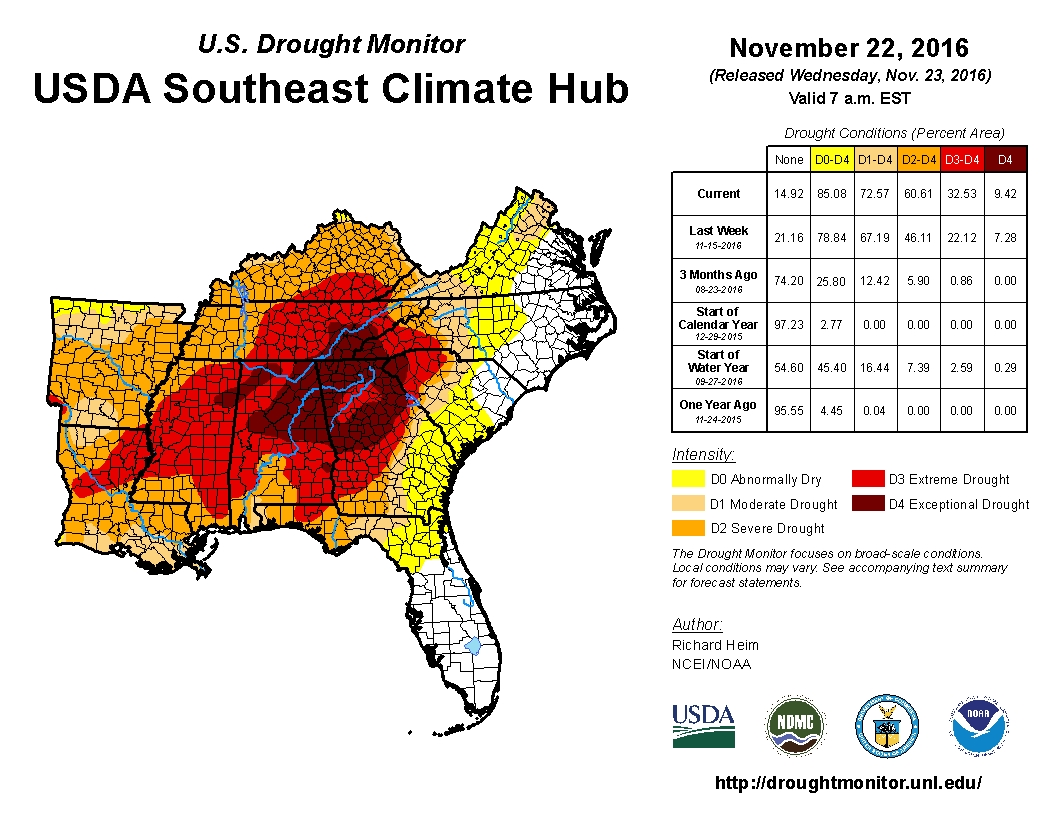
United States Drought Monitor image from November 22, 2016, showing extreme to exceptional drought across the southeastern United States

Firefighters from 21 states including Washington and Oregon were part of the effort to fight the blazes. North Carolina Governor Pat McCrory said 1,600 firefighters fought 19 fires in his state, at a cost of $10 million. Arson is believed to be responsible for several fires in the Nantahala National Forest where 46,000 acres had burned. Lightning and accidental human activity such as campfires may have started some fires. Poor air quality was an issue in Asheville and other parts of western North Carolina.

The Asheville Regional Airport reported no rain for ten days after October 8, 2016, after which the area was considered to be in severe drought, while Cherokee, Clay and Macon Counties were considered to be in extreme drought. A month later these three counties and Graham and part of Swain were in exceptional drought, and ten other counties were in extreme drought. Only a trace of rain fell in the month ending November 15, and the airport reported a deficit of 10.8 inches (27 cm) for the year 2016 as of November 18.

== Western North Carolina ==
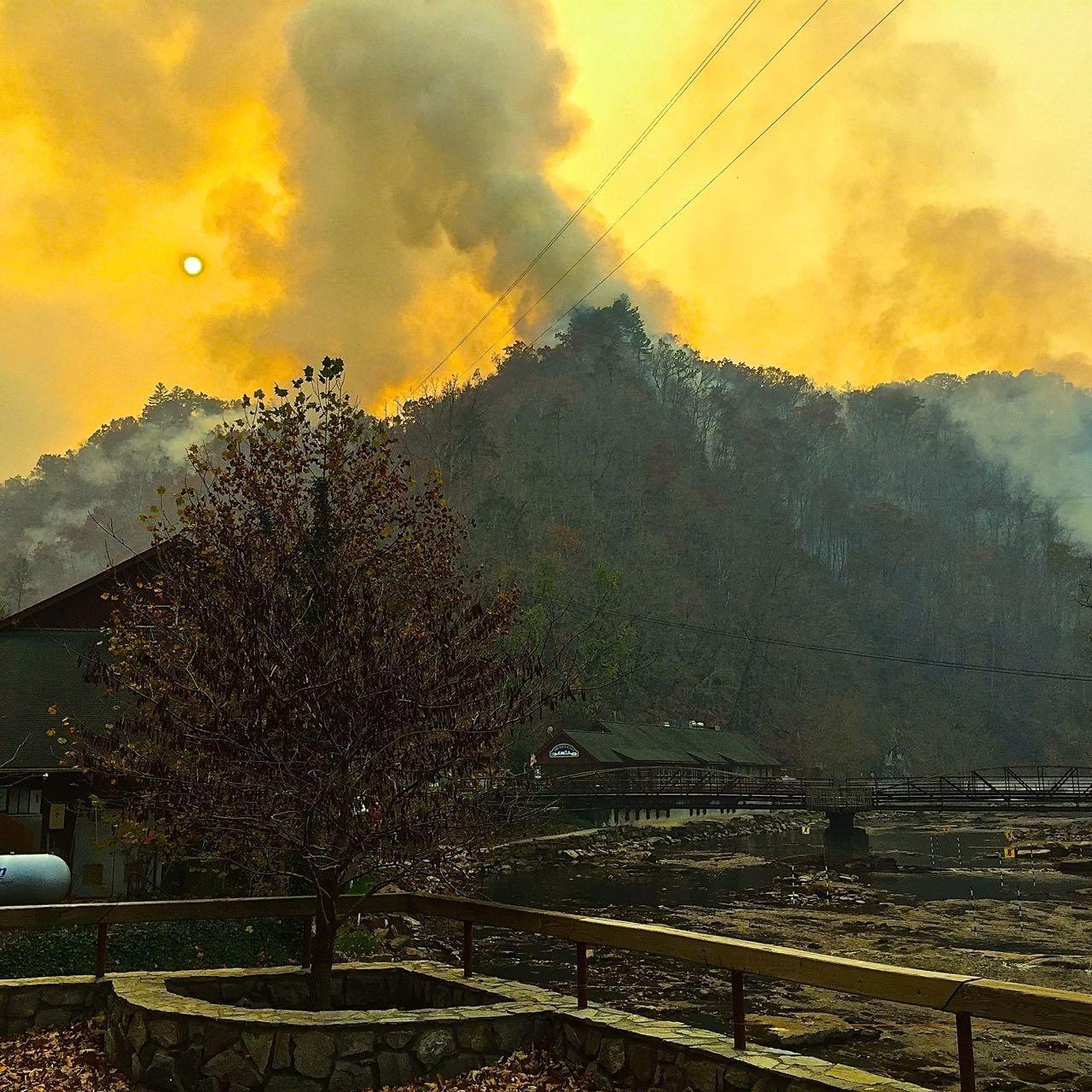
Smoke from the Tellico Fire near the Nantahala Outdoor Center

External videos
- Haze over Atlanta caused by the wildfires
- Reconnaissance Flight over the Rock Mountain Fire
- RAW: Footage shows burnt out buildings in aftermath of Tennessee wildfire on YouTube

The Tellico Fire in North Carolina began October 23 in Swain County and burned over 5,600 hectares (14,000 acres). The Boteler Fire in Clay County began October 25 and burned 3,600 hectares (8,900 acres).

The Party Rock Fire, which McCrory called number two in the country, began November 5 and burned 2,900 hectares (7,200 acres), resulting in the evacuation of 1,000 people in the areas of Bat Cave, Chimney Rock and Lake Lure. People were allowed to return to Chimney Rock on November 21. Firefighters who came mostly from the eastern part of the state had watched buildings in the towns while local fire departments covered their areas. Lake Lure was the headquarters for operations.

On November 30 a man was arrested for setting two Macon County fires. By December 6 substantial rain had helped greatly in the effort to bring under control as many as 34 fires which had burned 60,000 acres.

== Northern Georgia ==
The Rough Ridge fire in the Cohutta Wilderness, believed to have started from a lightning strike October 16, burned almost 11,300 hectares (28,000 acres), making it one of the largest fires ever in Georgia. The Rock Mountain fire was about 4,250 hectares (10,500 acres) and caused the evacuation of Dream Catcher Cove north of Tate City.

== East Tennessee ==
On November 11, 2016, a Chattanooga man was arrested for setting three separate fires north and west of the city. Over 500 acres had been burned in connection with these fires. Governor Bill Haslam issued a burn ban for 51 counties starting on November 14 through December 15.

On November 16 two men were arrested for arson in separate wildfire incidents in Tennessee. In Sequatchie County, an Alabama man admitted to dropping a cigarette in a pile of leaves, watching it burn and leaving without putting it out. In Monroe County, a resident was arrested for starting a burn on personal property, against the burn ban, that got out of control.

The Tennessee Division of Forestry reported 64 fires had burned 17,734 acres. The largest was in Morgan County in the White Oak Circle area covered about 1,900 acres. Another on Neddy Mountain in Cocke County had burned 1,116 acres. By November 21, just 95 acres were reported still burning in Tennessee, and at least half of the state's fires were reported to be started in connection with arson.

On November 28, the Chimney Tops 2 fire in the Chimney Tops of the Great Smoky Mountains National Park spread with the aid of strong winds and dry conditions, the fire quickly broke into multiple fires and spread across the mountains above and around Gatlinburg. By the evening hours the fire had reached the downtown area of Gatlinburg, resulting in the evacuation of over 14,000 people, along with causing damage in and around the town. By November 29, the wildfires had claimed at least three lives. An additional four people were later confirmed dead the next day. The Chimney Tops 2 fire had burned 17,006 acres. A total of 14 people died and 134 others were injured in the Smoky Mountains fires, while over 2,400 structures were burned. Damages were totaled to over $500 million.

On December 8, the burn ban was lifted for four of the 51 counties in Tennessee to aid cleanup of tornadoes that happened on November 29 in southeast Tennessee.

== See also ==
- List of wildfires
