= List of summits and ridges of Rabun County, Georgia =

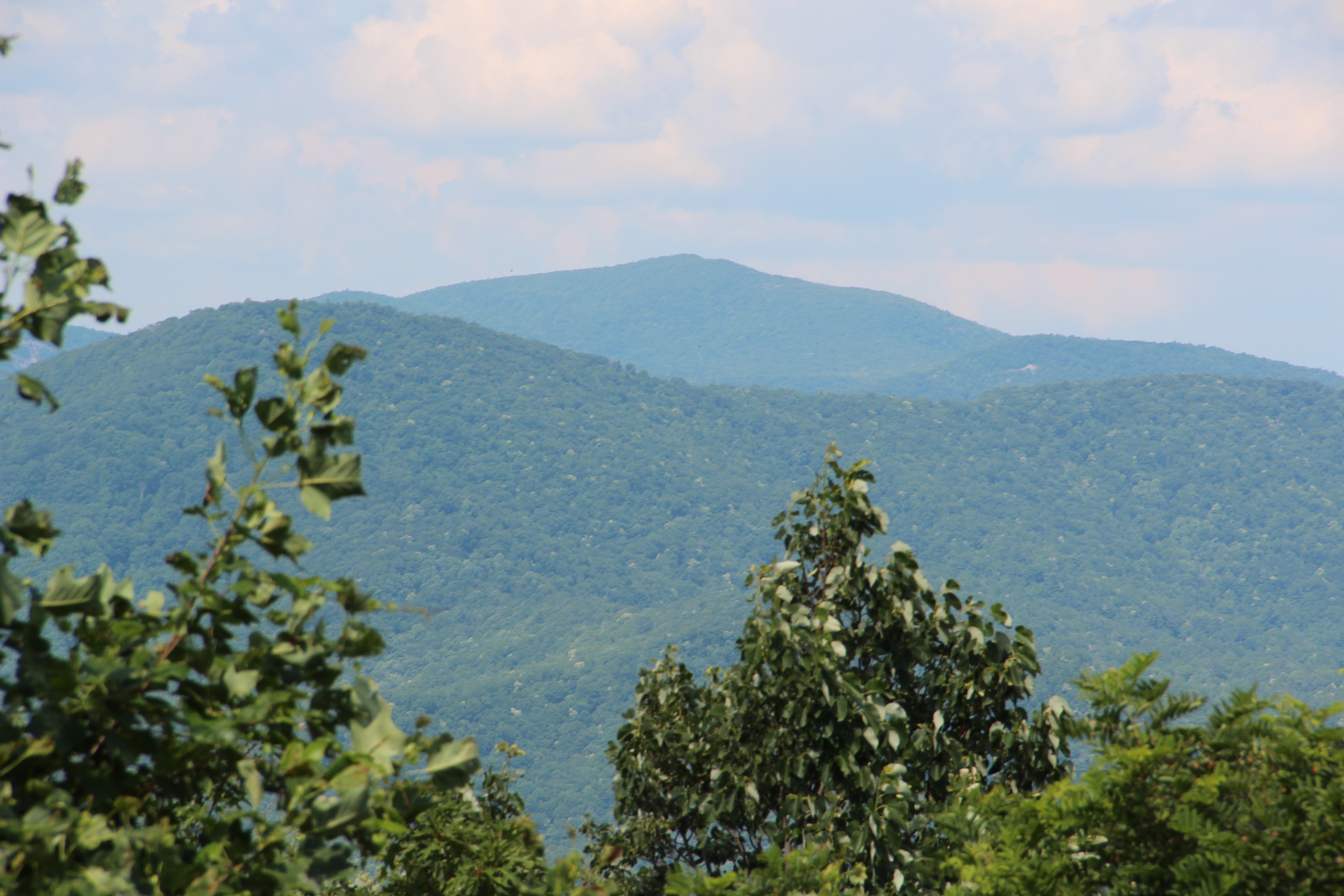
Rabun Bald is the tallest mountain in Rabun County

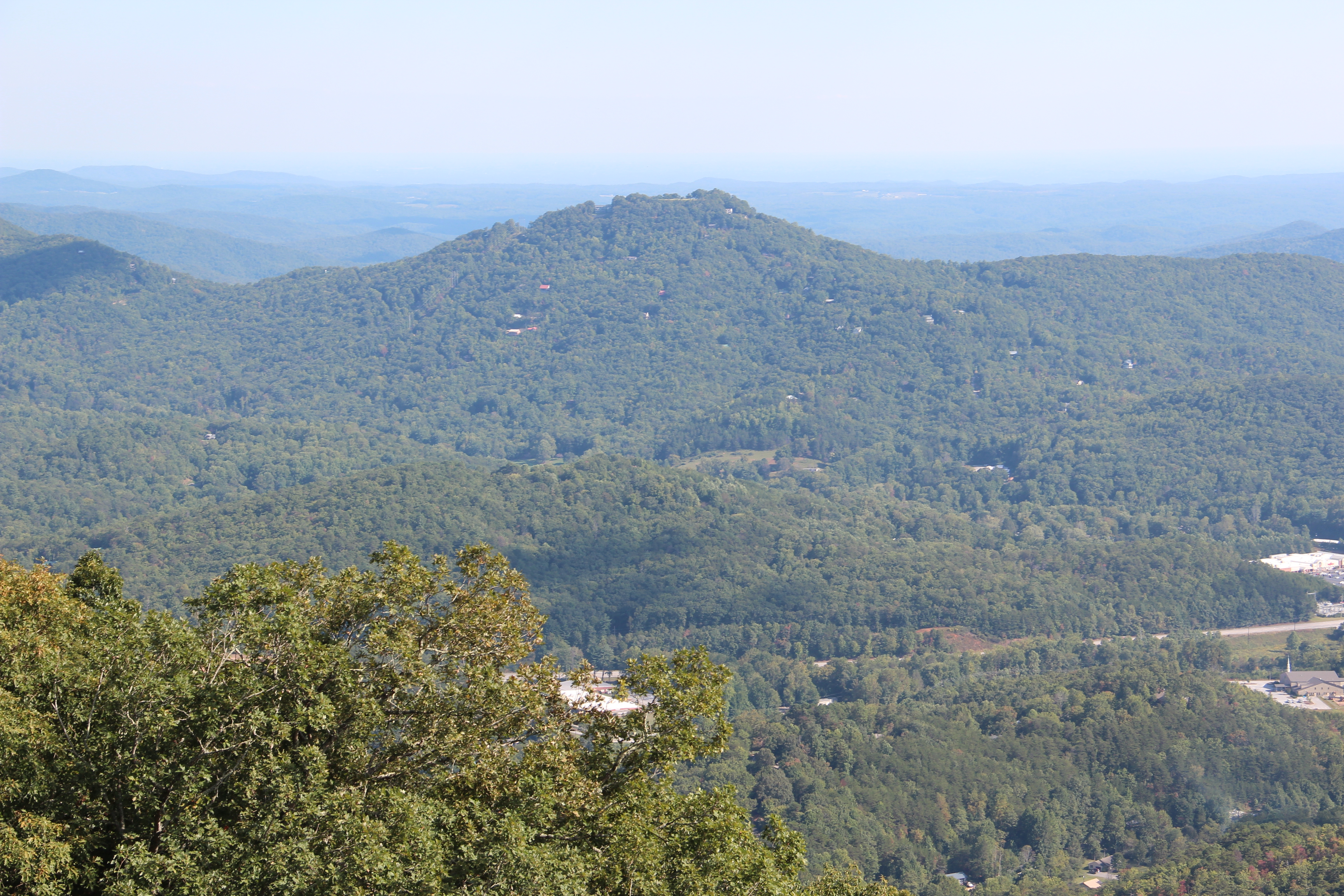
Screamer Mountain

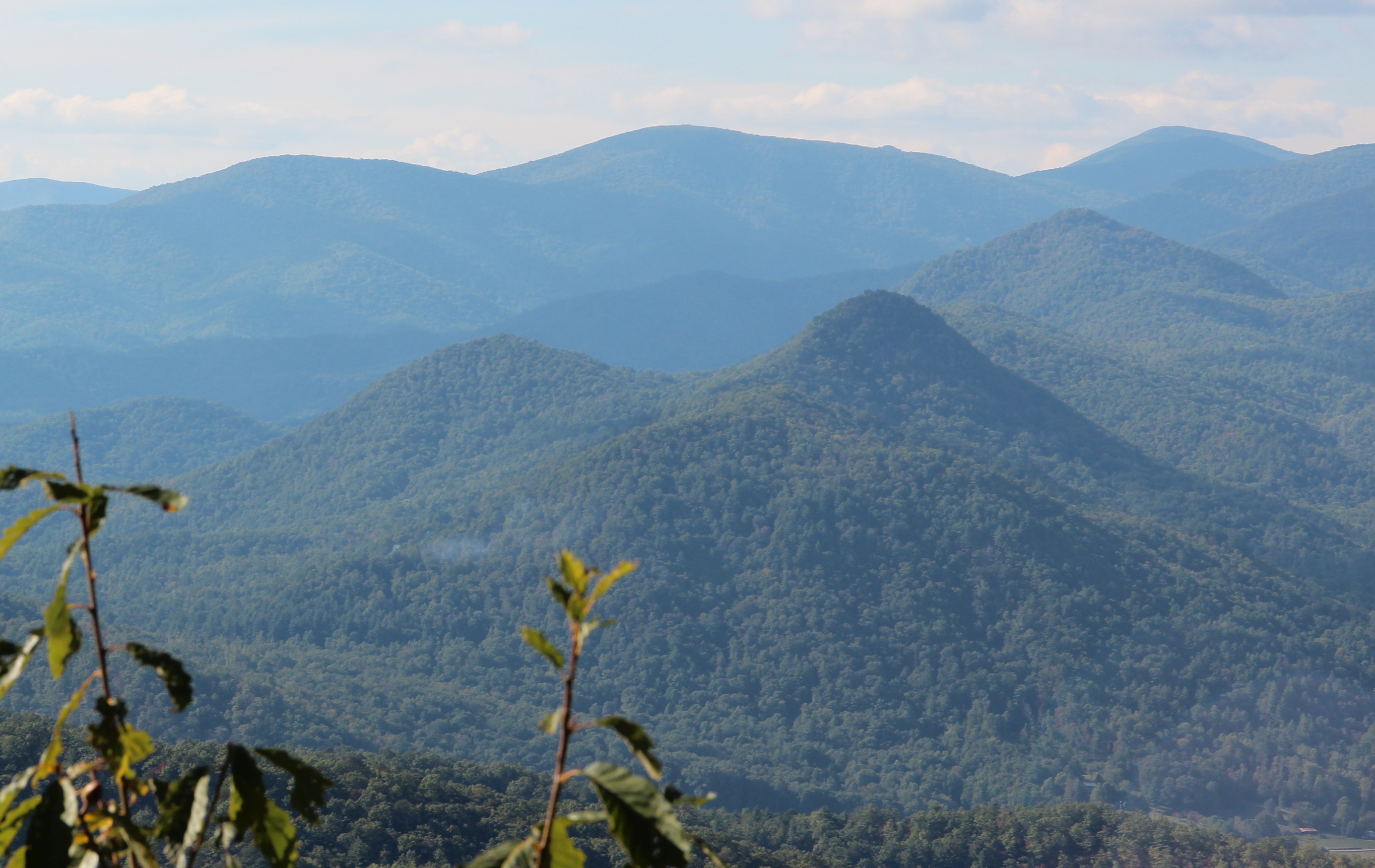
Mountain knobs seen from Black Rock Mountain State Park

This is a list of summits and ridge highpoints in Rabun County, Georgia with elevations greater than 2,800 feet (850 m).

Note: ^Marked elevations have been estimated from topographic maps.

| Feature | Type | USGS Topo Map | Elevation |
|---|---|---|---|
| Rabun Bald | summit | Rabun Bald | 4696 feet |
| Dick's Knob | summit | Hightower Bald | 4600 feet |
| Grassy Ridge | ridge | Dillard | 4406 feet |
| Unnamed peak | summit | Rabun Bald | 4400^ feet |
| Flint Knob | summit | Rabun Bald | 4240 feet |
| Steeltrap Knob | summit | Hightower Bald | 4160 feet |
| Flat Top | summit | Rabun Bald | 4142 feet |
| Alex Mountain | summit | Rabun Bald | 4080 feet |
| Wolf Knob | summit | Dillard | 3979 feet |
| Fodderstack | summit | Rabun Bald | 3960 feet |
| Dismal Knob | summit | Macedonia | 3920 feet |
| Ford Mountain | summit | Rabun Bald | 3920 feet |
| Chestnut Mountain | summit | Hightower Bald | 3883 feet |
| Whiteoak Stomp | summit | Macedonia | 3880 feet |
| Powell Mountain | summit | Macedonia | 3840 feet |
| Oakey Mountain | summit | Rabun Bald | 3826 feet |
| Penson Knob | summit | Dillard | 3800 feet |
| Gulf Knob | summit | Dillard | 3760 feet |
| Scaly Knob | summit | Dillard | 3750 feet |
| Buzzard Knob | summit | Hightower Bald | 3720 feet |
| Rattlesnake Knob | summit | Rabun Bald | 3720 feet |
| Rock Ridge | ridge | Rabun Bald | 3720^ feet |
| Double Knob | summit | Rabun Bald | 3684 feet |
| Blacks Creek Knob | summit | Rabun Bald | 3680 feet |
| Rock Mountain | summit | Rabun Bald | 3680 feet |
| Glade Mountain | summit | Satolah | 3672 feet |
| Blackrock Mountain | summit | Dillard | 3640 feet |
| Unnamed peak | ridge | Hightower Bald | 3640^ feet |
| Queen Mine Knob | summit | Dillard | 3615 feet |
| Unnamed peak | ridge | TrayMountain | 3600^ feet |
| Cedar Kno | summit | Dillard | 3545 feet |
| Double Knob(east) | summit | Dillard | 3545 feet |
| Big Face | summit | Dillard | 3541 feet |
| Almond Bald | summit | Dillard | 3520^ feet |
| Black Mountain | summit | Hightower Bald | 3480 feet |
| Parks Mountain | summit | Hightower Bald | 3480 feet |
| Wilson Knob | summit | Rabun Bald | 3480 feet |
| Redside Mountain | summit | Satolah | 3460 feet |
| Glassy Mountain | summit | Lake Burton | 3440 feet |
| Little Bald Knob | summit | Hightower Bald | 3440 feet |
| Ledford Mountain | summit | Dillard | 3440 feet |
| Ben Mountain | summit | Rabun Bald | 3400 feet |
| Double Knob(west) | summit | Rabun Bald | 3361 feet |
| Towns Mountain | summit | Hightower Bald | 3360 feet |
| Cedar Cliff Knob | summit | Hightower Bald | 3320 feet |
| Rocky Knob | summit | Dillard | 3320^ feet |
| Raven Knob | summit | Rabun Bald | 3318 feet |
| Drip Nose Mountain | summit | Satolah | 3310 feet |
| Rocky Knob | summit | Rabun Bald | 3304 feet |
| Chestnut Knob | summit | Hightower Bald | 3280 feet |
| Chestnut Mountain | summit | Rabun Bald | 3270 feet |
| Elisha Mountain | summit | Dillard | 3250 feet |
| Keener Mountain | summit | Dillard | 3249 feet |
| Billy Mountain | summit | Dillard | 3243 feet |
| Muley Mountain | summit | Lake Burton | 3241 feet |
| Hale Ridge | ridge | Rabun Bald | 3240^ feet |
| Unnamed Peak | summit | Rabun Bald | 3240^ feet |
| Hellhole Mountain | summit | Lake Burton | 3220 feet |
| Unnamed peak | summit | Rabun Bald | 3212 feet |
| Owen Mountain | summit | Dillard | 3205 feet |
| Marsen Knob | summit | Dillard | 3200 feet |
| Shook Ridge | ridge | Hightower Bald | 3200^ feet |
| Lookoff Mountain | summit | Dillard | 3160 feet |
| Oakey Mountain | summit | Clarkesville NE | 3160 feet |
| Smokehouse Knob | summit | Dillard | 3160 feet |
| Straw Mountain | summit | Hightower Bald | 3144 feet |
| Pinnacle Knob | summit | Rabun Bald | 3141 feet |
| Hog Mountain | summit | Dillard | 3120 feet |
| Falls Mountain | summit | Lake Burton | 3090 feet |
| Bill Mountain | summit | Satolah | 3075 feet |
| Oakey Mountain | summit | Dillard | 3054 feet |
| Bee Bait Mountain | summit | Satolah | 3045 feet |
| Pinnacle Knob | summit | Dillard | 3045 feet |
| Cook Mountain | summit | Satolah | 3040 feet |
| Poplar Cove Mountain | summit | Hightower Bald | 3040 feet |
| Scrugg Knob | summit | Dillard | 3040 feet |
| Joe Mountain | summit | Tiger | 3030 feet |
| Jones Mountain | summit | Dillard | 3000 feet |
| Screamer Mountain | summit | Tiger | 3000 feet |
| Steele Knob | summit | Dillard | 3000 feet |
| Charlie Mountain | summit | Lake Burton | 2990 feet |
| Stamp Knob | summit | Tiger | 2970 feet |
| Edmonds Top | summit | Dillard | 2960 feet |
| Round Top | summit | Dillard | 2960 feet |
| Turkey Mountain | summit | Hightower Bald | 2960 feet |
| Rainy Mountain | summit | Rainy Mountain | 2945 feet |
| Seals Knob | summit | Tiger | 2894 feet |
| Rand Mountain | summit | Satolah | 2890 feet |
| Brown Mountain | summit | Satolah | 2883 feet |
| Buzzard Rock | summit | Satolah | 2880 feet |
| Gibbs Mountain | summit | Satolah | 2880 feet |
| Big Mountain | ridge | Satolah | 2870 feet |
| Tiger Mountain | summit | Tiger | 2856 feet |
| Beavert Mountain | summit | Dillard | 2831 feet |
| Rock Mountain | summit | Hightower Bald | 2824 feet |
| Stony Mountain | summit | Tallulah Falls | 2820 feet |

^Elevations estimated from topographic maps.

== See also ==
- List of mountains in Georgia (U.S. state)

== Sources ==
- Rabun County elevations from Topozone.com
- Georgia's Named Summits
- 100 highest peaks in Georgia
- Georgia peaks over 4,000 feet
