= List of peaks named Glass =

A number of peaks are named Glass:

== United States ==
Name	USGS link	State	County	USGS map	Coordinates	Elevation	
Glass Mountain		California	Napa	Saint Helena	38°31′51″N 122°28′48″W	604 ft	184 m
Glass Mountain		California	Siskiyou	Medicine Lake	41°36′06″N 121°30′16″W	7,598 ft	2,316 m
Glass Mountain		California	Mono	Glass Mountain	37°46′30″N 118°42′30″W	11,138 ft	3,395 m
Glass Mountain		Oregon	Grant	Magpie Table	44°04′50″N 118°42′52″W	5,610 ft	1,710 m
Little Glass Mountain		California	Siskiyou	Little Glass Mountain	41°34′03″N 121°41′10″W	6,801 ft	2,073 m
Glass Knob		Tennessee	Knox	Shooks Gap	35°54′11″N 083°47′55″W	1,220 ft	370 m
Glass Butte		Oregon	Lake	Glass Buttes	43°33′27″N 120°04′28″W	6,384 ft	1,946 m
Glassy Mountain		South Carolina	Pickens	Pickens	34°54′03″N 082°39′33″W	1,647 ft	502 m
Glassy Mountain		North Carolina	Henderson	Hendersonville	35°15′54″N 082°27′25″W	2,776 ft	846 m
Glassy Mountain		South Carolina	Greenville	Saluda	35°08′16″N 082°20′08″W	2,782 ft	848 m
Glassy Mountain		Georgia	Rabun	Lake Burton	34°50′44″N 083°30′02″W	3,432 ft	1,046 m
Glassy Knob		Georgia	Towns	Jacks Gap	34°52′09″N 083°46′29″W	3,297 ft	1,005 m
Looking Glass Rock		North Carolina	Transylvania	Shining Rock	35°18′13″N 082°47′36″W	3,969 ft	1,210 m
