= Glassy Mountain =

Glassy Mountain may refer to:

- Glassy Mountain (South Carolina), a mountain near Pickens, South Carolina
- Glassy Mountain (Georgia), a mountain in Chattahoochee National Forest, Georgia
