= List of mountains in Georgia (U.S. state) =

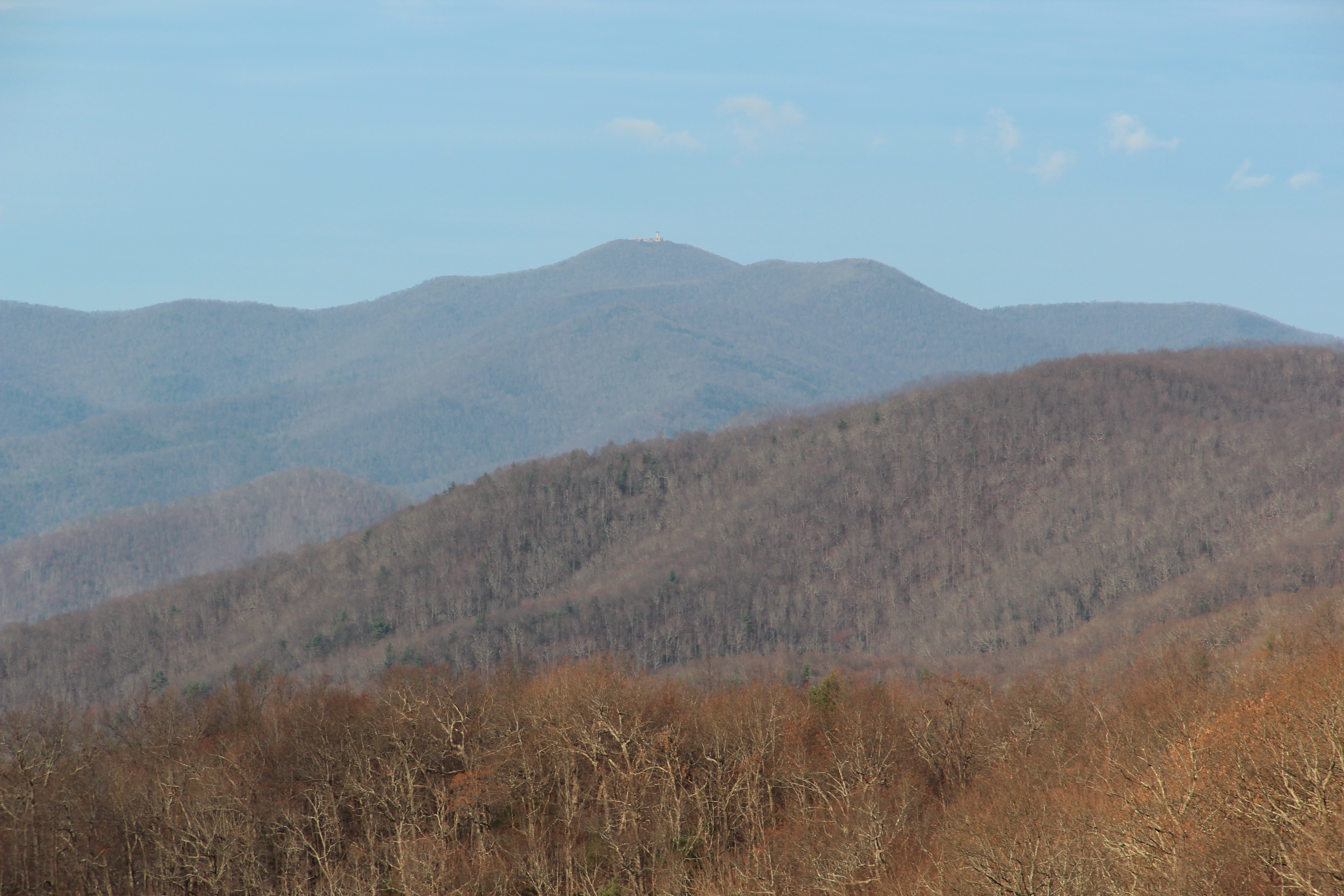
Brasstown Bald is the highest peak in the U.S. state of Georgia

This article lists notable mountains in the U.S. state of Georgia.

== Highest mountains ==
The following sortable table lists the 10 highest mountain peaks of Georgia with at least 100 feet (30 m) of topographic prominence. The eleven highest mountains in Georgia are all located in five counties in northeast Georgia. Some of these mountains have true summits or peaks, while others are high points on a ridge. Listings found elsewhere may not necessarily agree because they do not include each of these mountains.

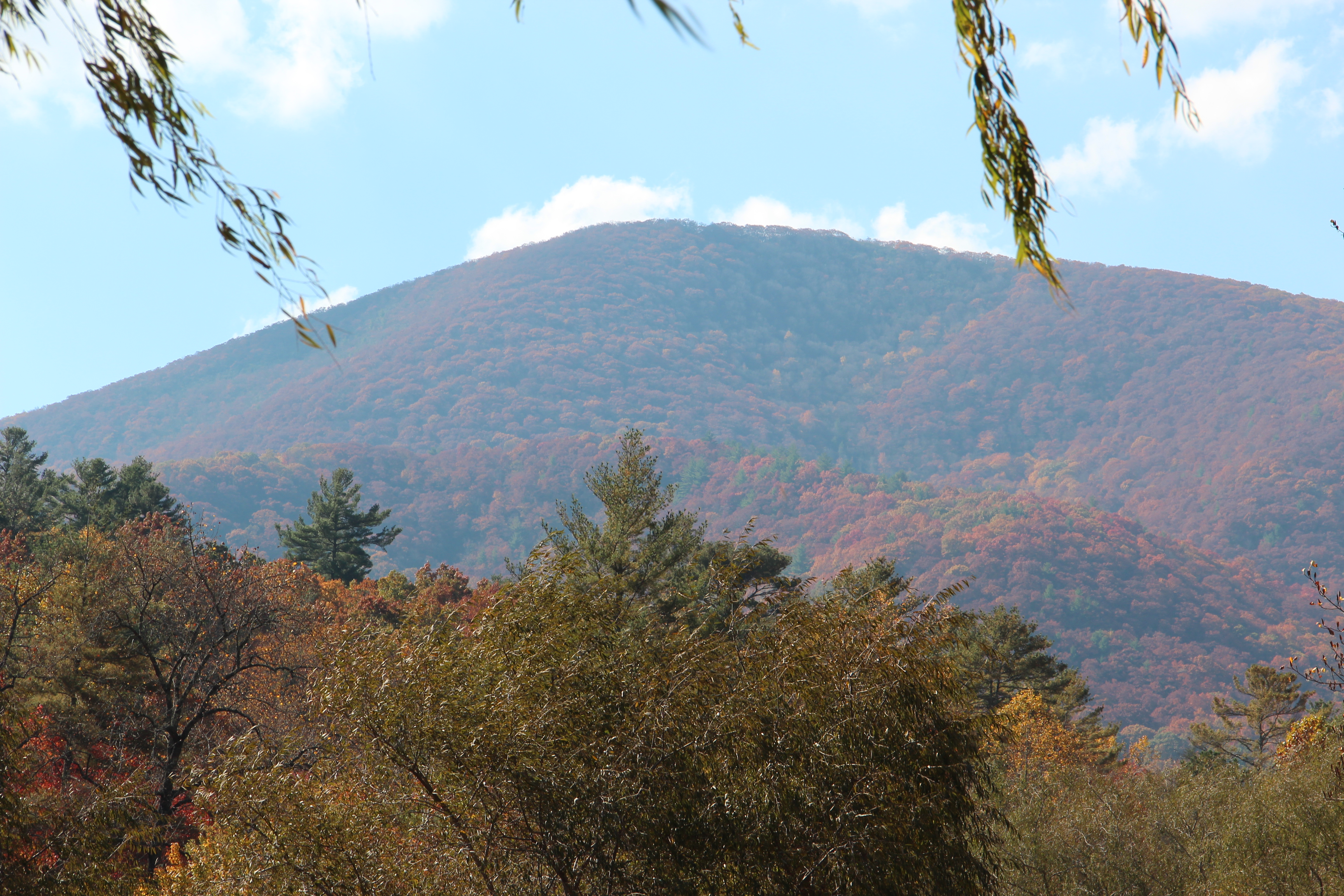
Blood Mountain, 6th tallest mountain in Georgia

The 10 highest summits of Georgia with at least 100 feet of topographic prominence
Rank	Summit	County	Elevation	Prominence	Isolation	Location
1	Brasstown Bald	Towns, Union	4,784 ft 1458 m	2,108 ft 643 m	15.93 mi 25.6 km	34°52′27″N 83°48′38″W
2	Rabun Bald	Rabun	4,696 ft 1431 m	1,016 ft 310 m	5.01 mi 8.06 km	34°57′56″N 83°18′00″W
3	Dick's Knob	Rabun	4,600 ft 1402 m	160 ft 49 m	0.91 mi 1.46 km	34°59′08″N 83°31′18″W
4	Hightower Bald	Towns	4,568 ft 1392 m	808 ft 246 m	2.38 mi 3.83 km	34°59′05″N 83°37′13″W
5	Wolfpen Ridge	Towns/Union	4,561 ft 1390 m	201 ft 61 m	0.72 mi 1.16 km	34°51′49″N 83°48′31″W
6	Blood Mountain	Lumpkin/Union	4,458 ft 1359 m	1,480 ft 451 m	11.24 mi 18.09 km	34°44′23″N 83°56′14″W
7	Tray Mountain	Towns/White	4,430 ft 1350 m	1,481 ft 451 m	8.3 mi 13.36 km	34°48′04″N 83°41′02″W
8	Grassy Ridge	Rabun	4,400 ft 1341 m	231 ft 70 m	1.04 mi 1.67 km	34°59′01″N 83°28′59″W
9	Slaughter Mountain	Union	4,338 ft 1322 m	458 ft 140 m	0.94 mi 1.51 km	34°44′53″N 83°57′01″W
10	Double Spring Knob	Rabun/Towns	4,280 ft 1305 m	920 ft 280 m	5.54 mi 8.92 km	34°52′42″N 83°39′24″W
10	Coosa Bald	Union	4,280 ft 1305 m	960 ft 293 m	2.25 mi 3.62 km	34°46′44″N 83°57′48″W

== Other Blue Ridge mountains ==
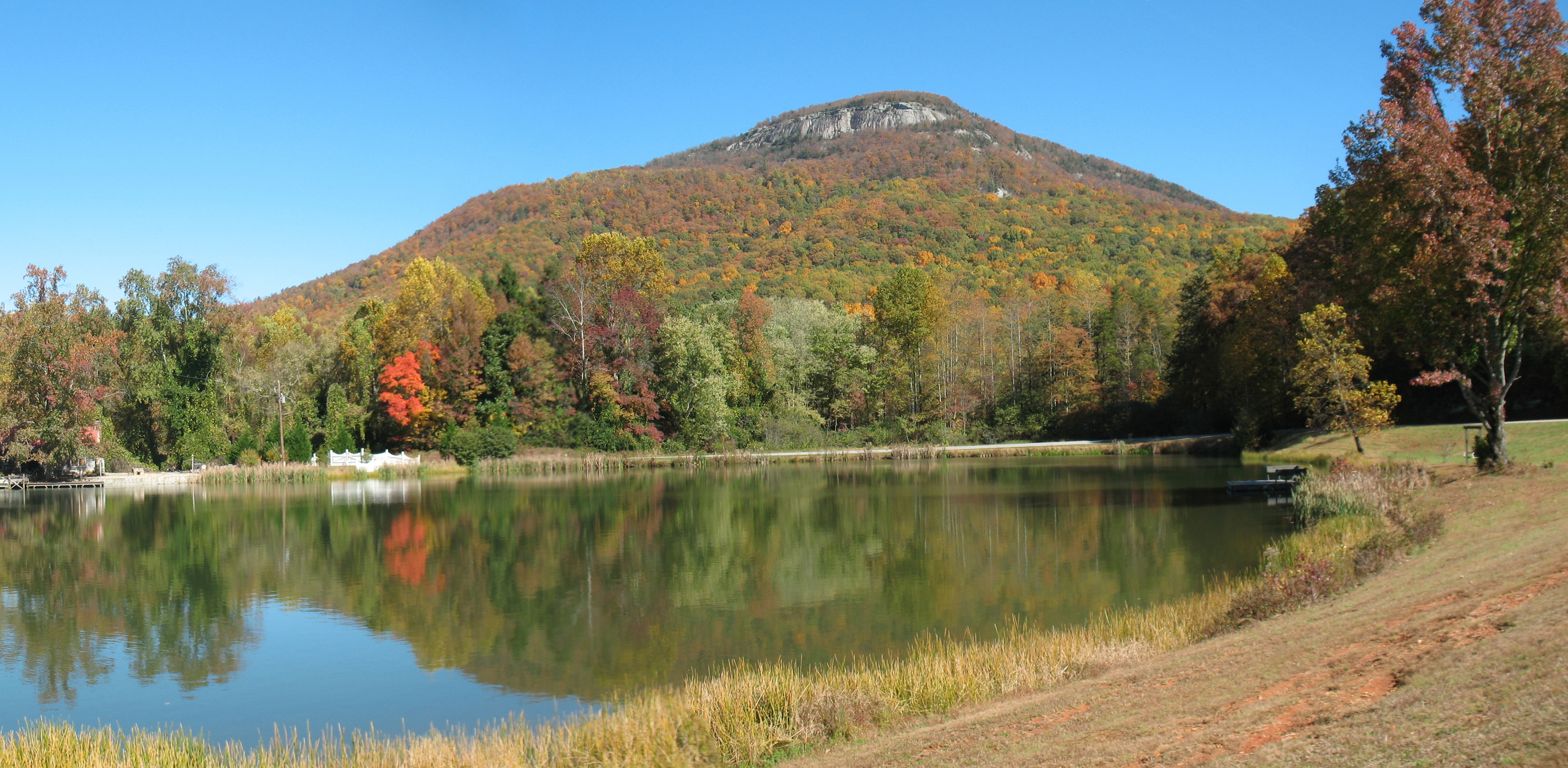
Yonah Mountain

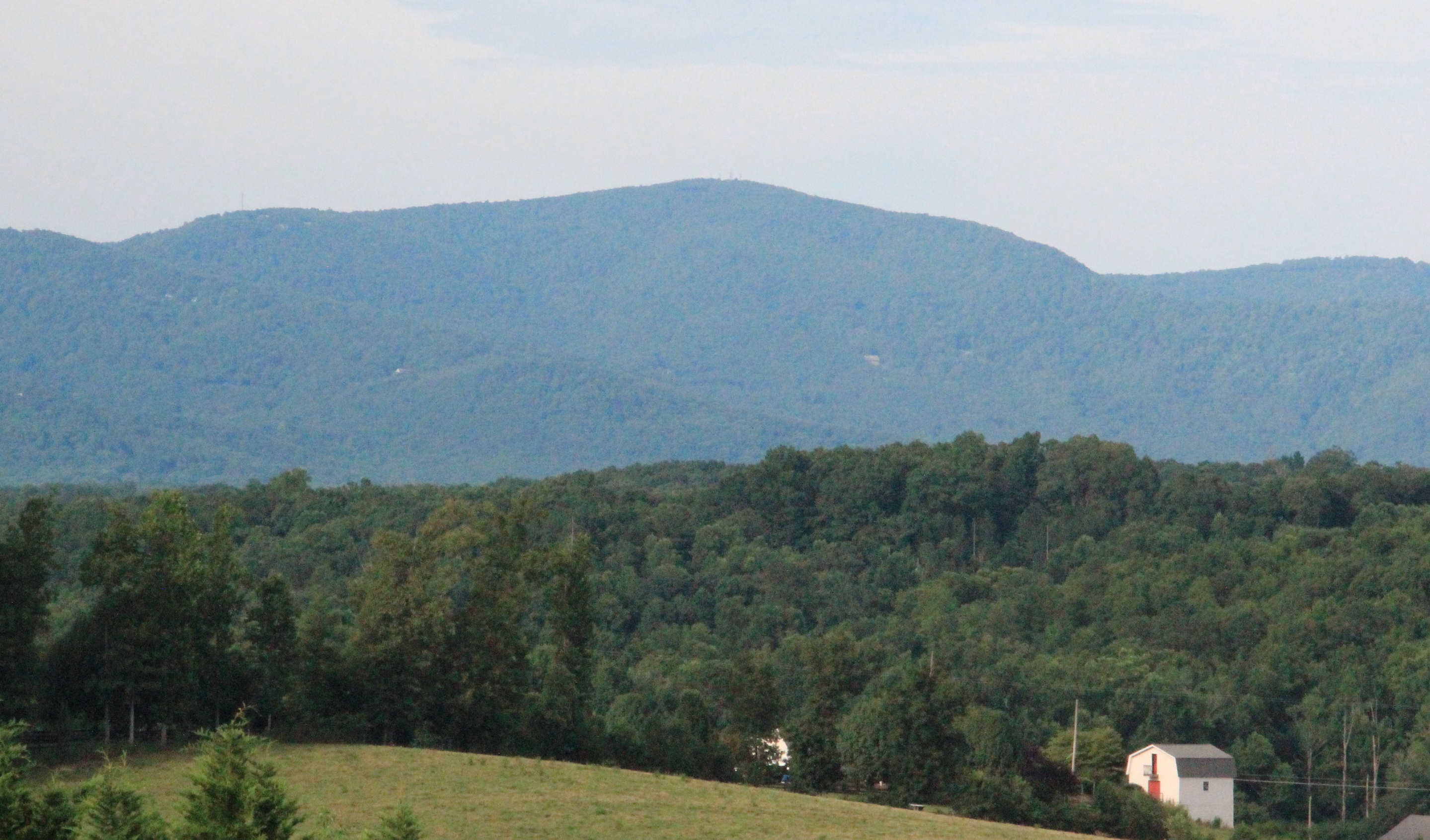
Mount Oglethorpe

- Big Bald Mountain
- Black Mountain (Georgia)
- Black Rock Mountain
- Big John Dick Mountain
- Cowrock Mountain
- Flat Top (Georgia mountain)
- Fort Mountain (Murray County, Georgia)
- Glade Mountain
- Glassy Mountain
- Grassy Mountain
- Horsetrough Mountain
- Jacks Knob
- Levelland Mountain
- Mount Oglethorpe
- Rich Knob
- Rich Mountain (Georgia)
- Rock Mountain (Georgia)
- Rocky Mountain (Georgia)
- Rocky Knob (Georgia)
- Screamer Mountain
- Springer Mountain
- Three Sisters (Georgia)
- Wildcat Mountain (Georgia)
- Yonah Mountain
- Young Lick

== Ridge-and-Valley ==
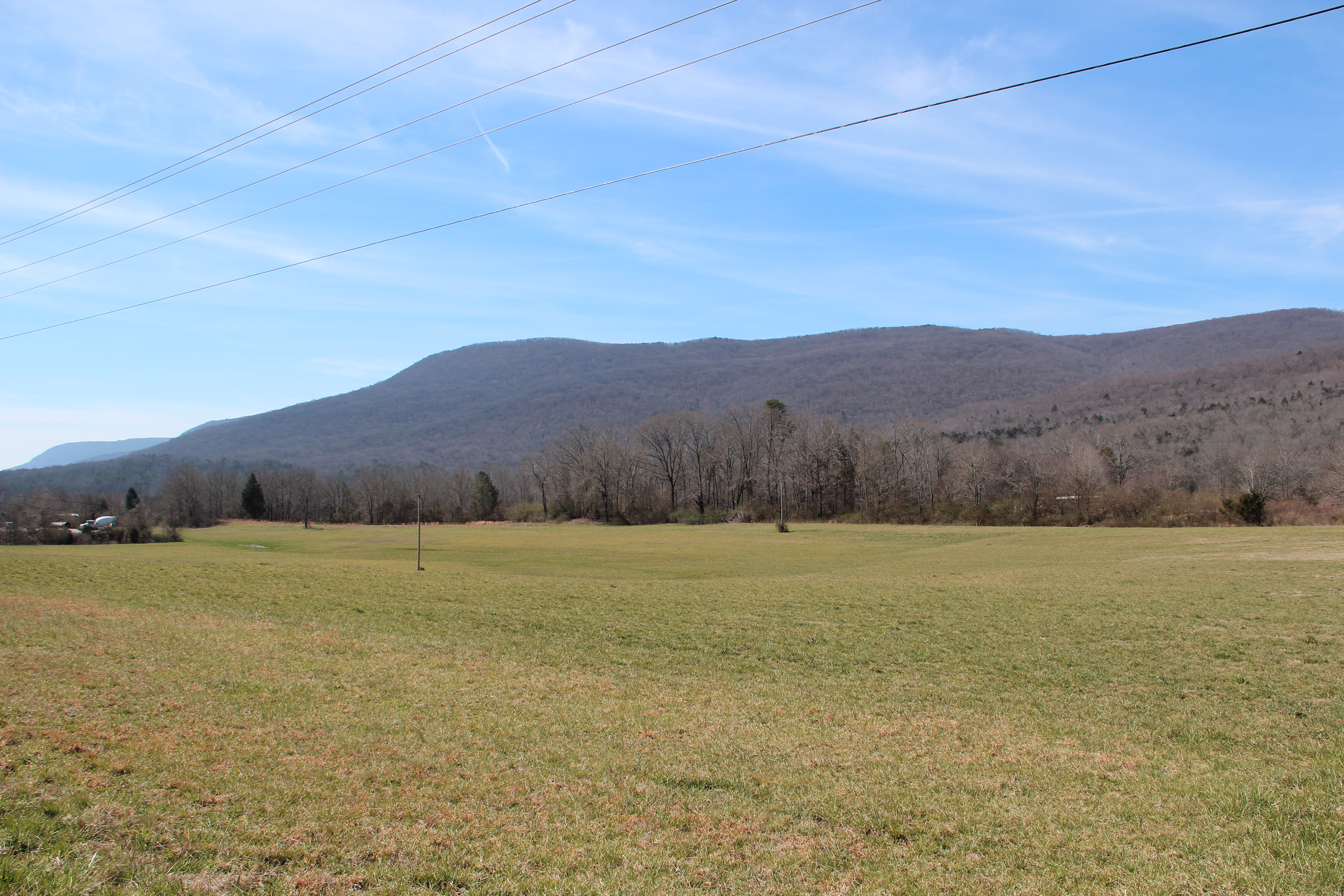
Pigeon Mountain

- Baugh Mountain
- Johns Mountain
- Lookout Mountain
- Pigeon Mountain
- Snodgrass Hill
- Taylor Ridge (Georgia)

== Other mountains ==
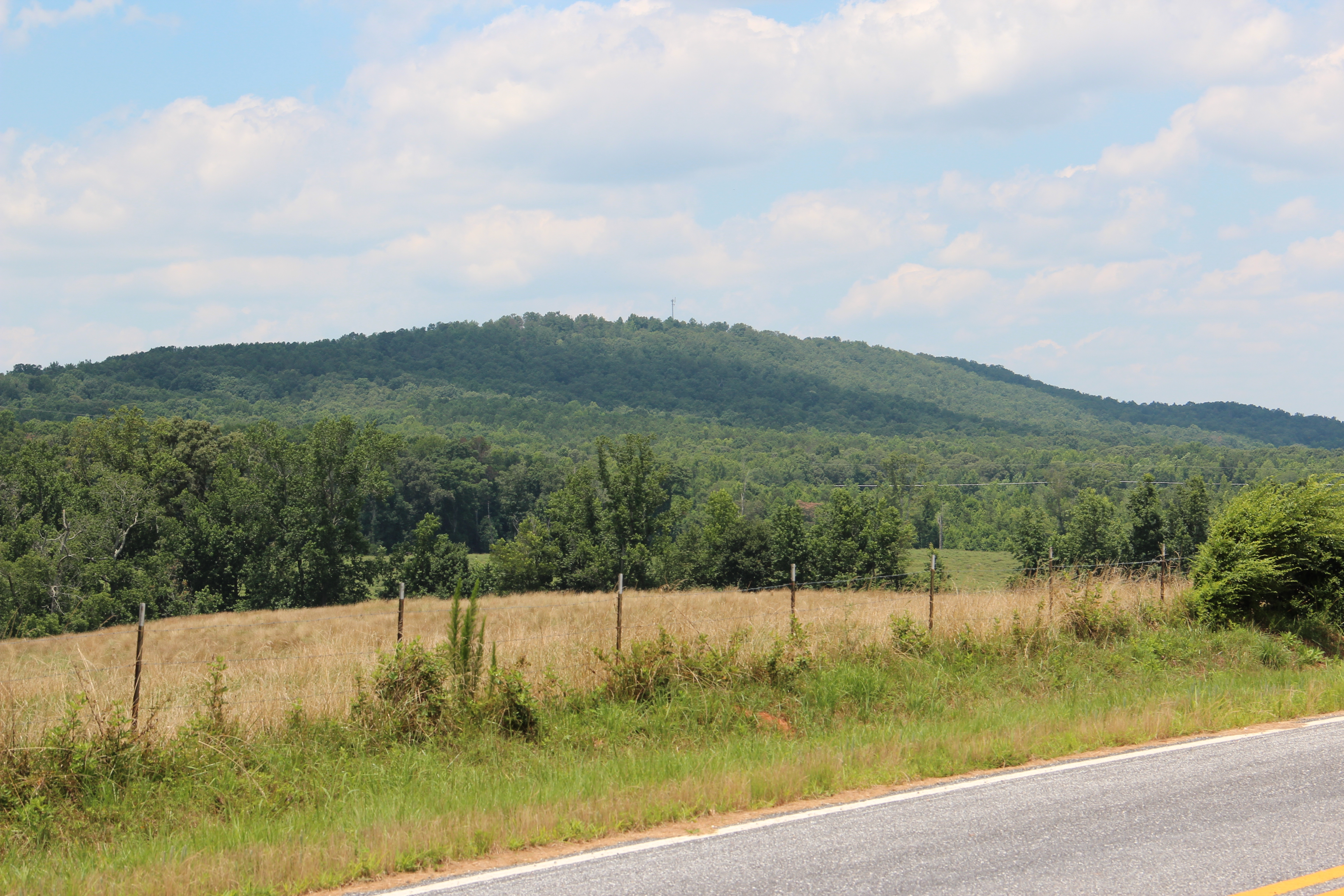
Blackjack Mountain

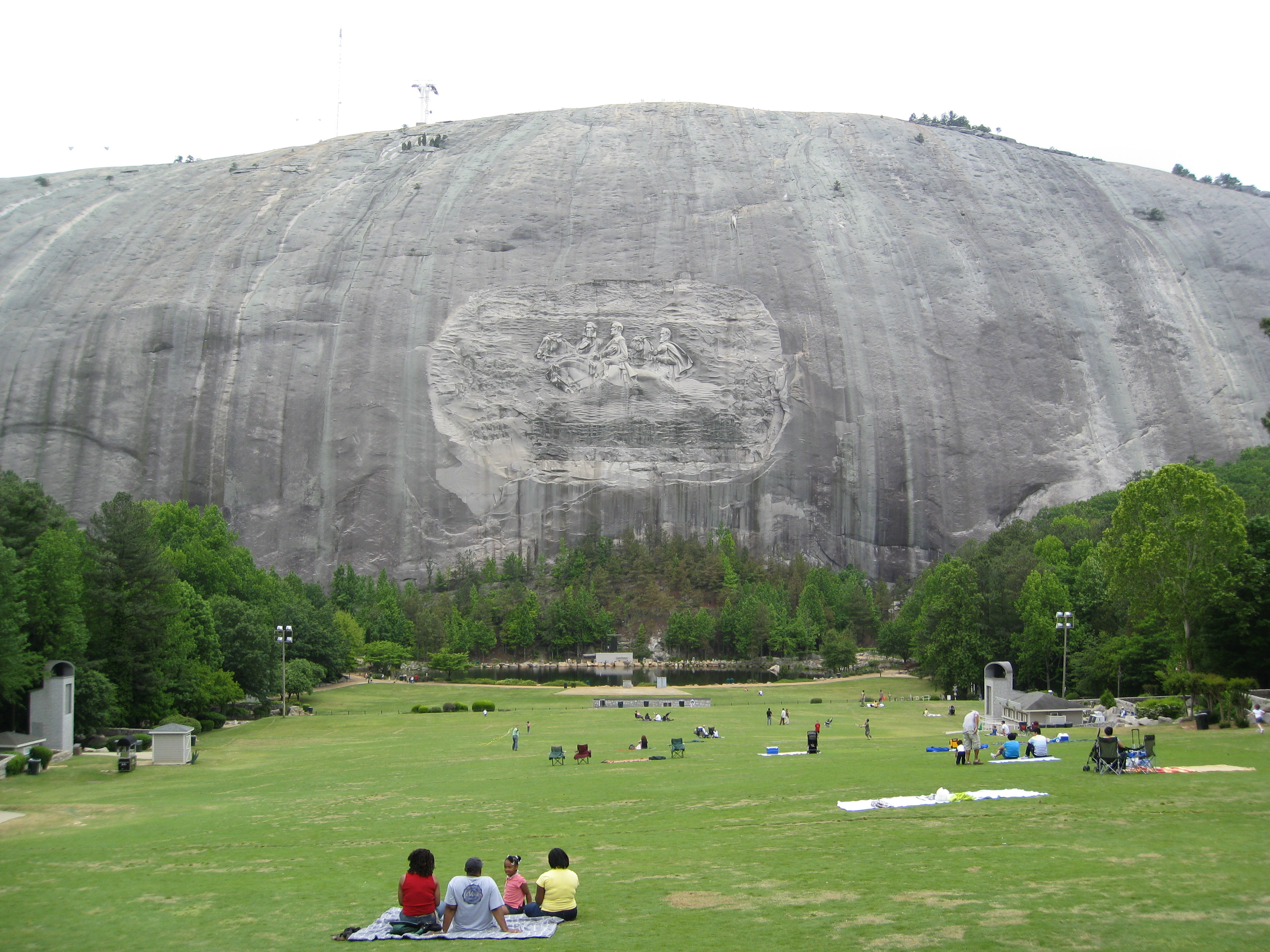
Stone Mountain

- Alcovy Mountain
- Arabia Mountain
- Bear Mountain (Georgia)
- Blackjack Mountain (Carroll County, Georgia)
- Chenocetah Mountain
- Currahee Mountain
- Dowdell's Knob
- Kennesaw Mountain
- Little Kennesaw Mountain
- Panola Mountain
- Pine Log Mountain
- Pine Mountain (Bartow County, Georgia)
- Pine Mountain (Cobb County, Georgia)
- Sawnee Mountain
- Stone Mountain
- Sweat Mountain
- Wauka Mountain
- Mount Wilkinson

== See also ==
- List of mountains in the United States
- List of mountain passes in Georgia (U.S. state)
