= Big Bald Mountain =

Mountain in Gilmer County, Georgia, United States

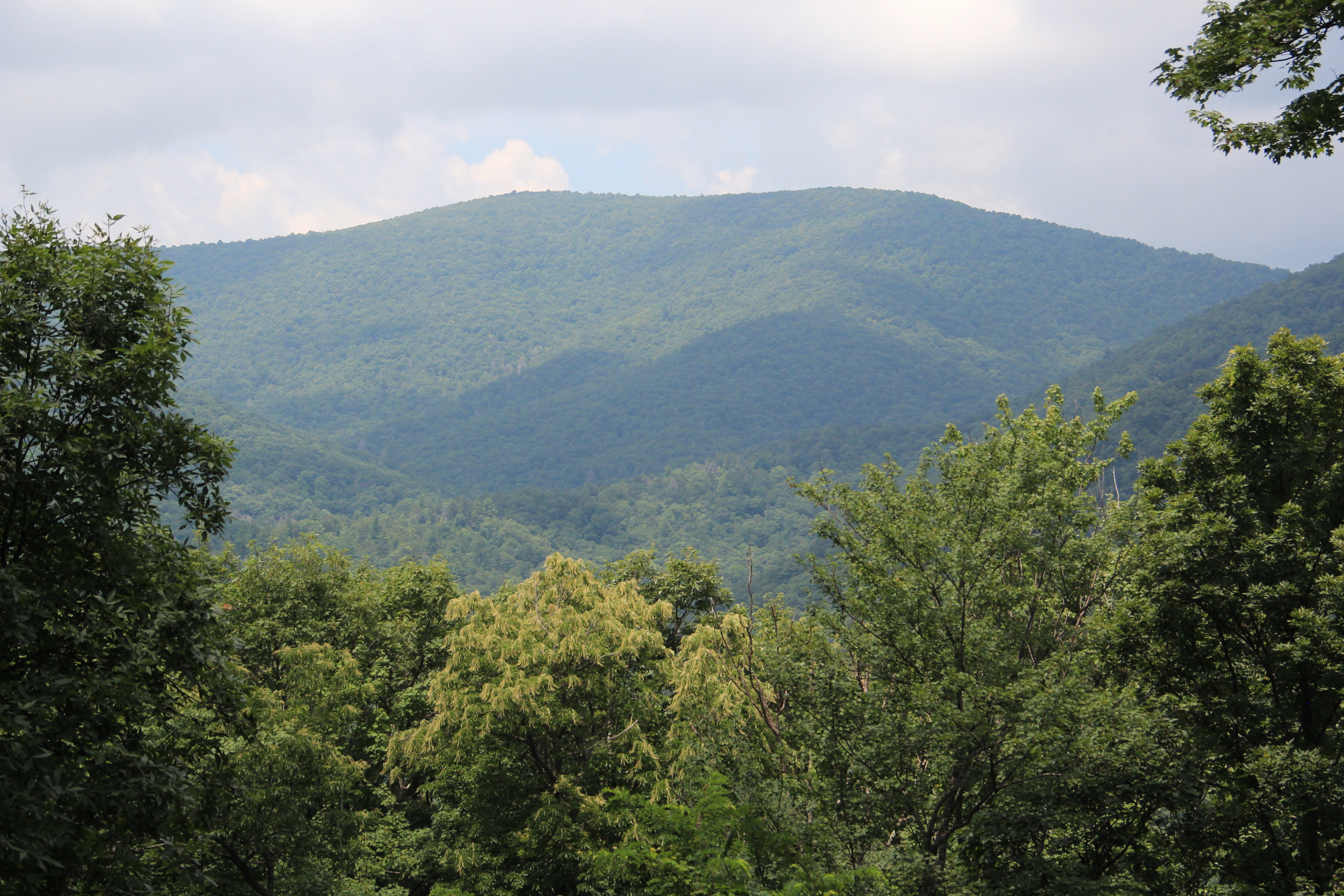
- Big Bald Mountain, viewed from the Bear Rock Ridge Bed and Breakfast

Highest point
- Elevation: 4,055 ft (1,236 m)
- Prominence: 1,755 ft (535 m)
- Listing: Highest point in Gilmer County
- Coordinates: 34°45′05″N 84°19′14″W

Geography
- Location within Georgia
- Location: Chattahoochee National Forest
- Parent range: Blue Ridge Mountains
- Topo map(s): USGS Blue Ridge, GA

Big Bald Mountain is the highest peak in Gilmer County, Georgia, U.S. and is in the Rich Mountain Wilderness, which is administered as a component of the Chattahoochee National Forest.

== Description ==
Many of the mountains in this area are covered in a deep, black porter's loam. The vegetation in the area consists of second-growth hardwood forests.

The mountain is about 4.5 miles (7.2 km) southwest of Cherry Log, 10 miles (16 km) northeast of Ellijay and about 8 miles (13 km) south of Blue Ridge. Rich Mountain is about 1.4 miles (2.3 km) southwest of Big Bald Mountain, while U.S. Route 76 runs to the west of the mountain. Big Bald Mountain's summit is inside the Rich Mountain Wildlife Management Area. With an elevation of 4,075 feet (1,242 m), Big Bald Mountain is the tallest mountain in Gilmer County. It is also the 19th tallest mountain in the state of Georgia using a 160 feet prominence rule.

== Hiking ==
No trails pass over Big Bald Mountain's summit. However, hikers can climb to the summit by hiking off-trail from Rich Mountain Road, a former logging road running through the Rich Mountains.

== See also ==
- List of mountains in Georgia (U.S. state)
