= Rich Mountain (Georgia) =

Mountain in the U.S. state of Georgia

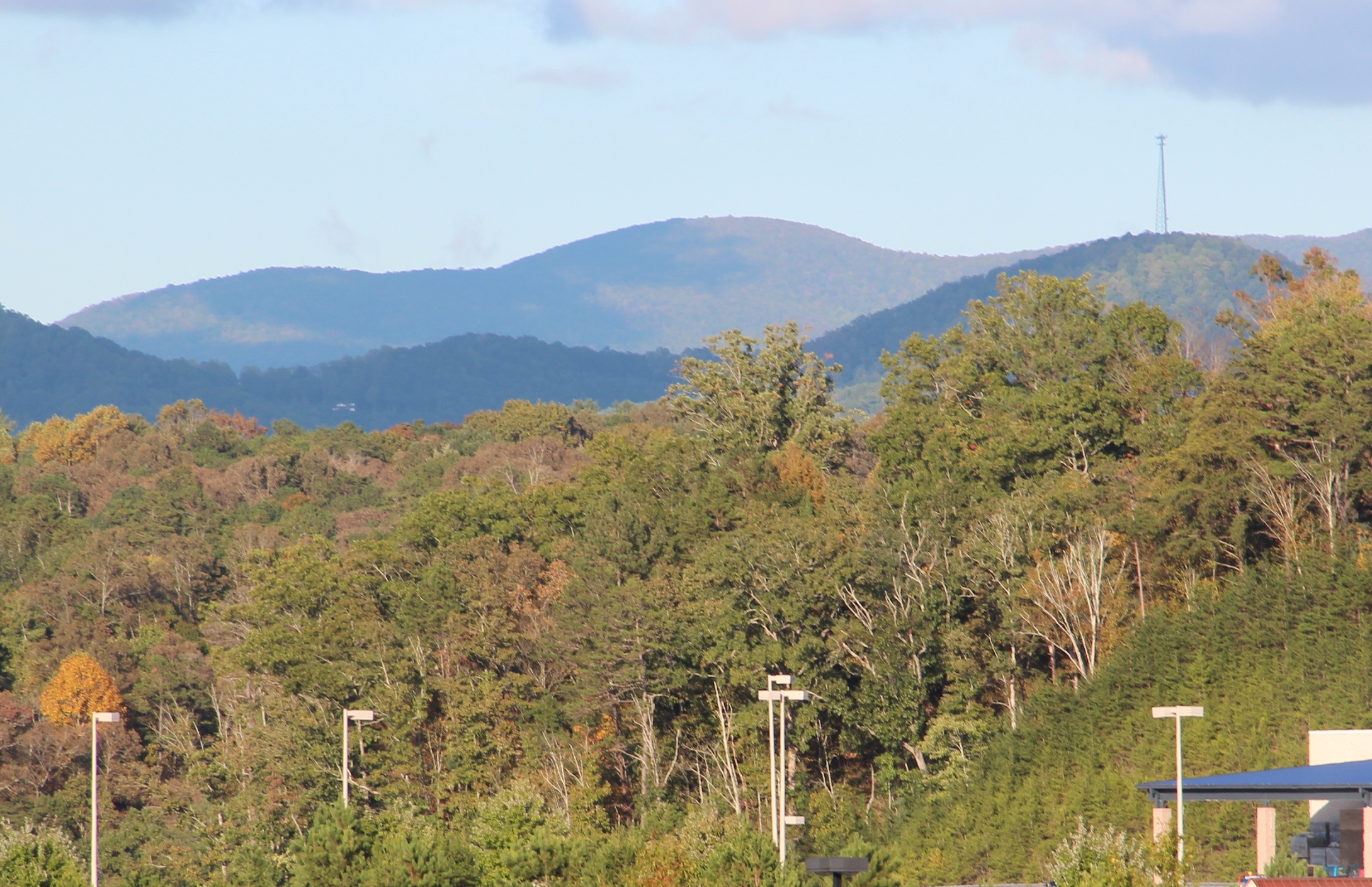
- Rich Mountain viewed from Georgia State Route 515

Highest point
- Elevation: 4,040 ft (1,230 m)
- Prominence: 331 ft
- Coordinates: 34.743611°N 84.343056°W

Geography
- Location within Georgia
- Location: Gilmer County, Georgia, U.S.
- Parent range: Georgia Blue Ridge Mountains
- Topo map: USGS Tickanetley

Climbing
- Easiest route: Hiking

Rich Mountain, elevation 4,040 feet (1,230 m), is the highest point in the Rich Mountain Wilderness of the Chattahoochee National Forest in Gilmer County, Georgia. It is the second-highest peak in Gilmer County; only Big Bald Mountain is taller, with its summit at 4,081 feet (1,244 m).

== Description ==
Rich Mountain is the namesake peak of the Rich Mountains, a circular-shaped range of mountains located in northeastern Gilmer County. Rich Mountain is located at the center of this range, with ridges and valleys radiating outward from the mountain. Many of these mountains are covered in a deep, black porter's loam. The vegetation in the area consists of second-growth hardwood forests.

The mountain is located about 4 miles (6.4 km) southwest of Cherry Log and 9 miles (14 km) northeast of Ellijay. Big Bald Mountain, the highest point in Gilmer County, is located about 1.4 miles (2.3 km) northeast of Rich Mountain. U.S. Route 76 runs to the west of the mountain. Rich Mountain's summit is located inside the Rich Mountain Wilderness, as well as the Rich Mountain Wildlife Management Area.

With an elevation of 4,040 feet (1,230 m), Rich Mountain is the second tallest mountain in Gilmer County and the highest point of the Rich Mountain Wilderness. It is also the 21st tallest mountain in the state of Georgia, if using a 160 feet prominence rule.

The Civilian Conservation Corps built a fire tower on Rich Mountain's summit during the Great Depression; only a stone chimney and fireplace remain standing on the summit.

== Hiking ==
No trails pass over Rich Mountain's summit. However, hikers can climb to the summit by hiking off-trail from Rich Mountain Road, a former logging road running through the Rich Mountains.

== See also ==
- List of mountains in Georgia (U.S. state)
