= Wolfpen Ridge =

Mountain ridge in Georgia, United States

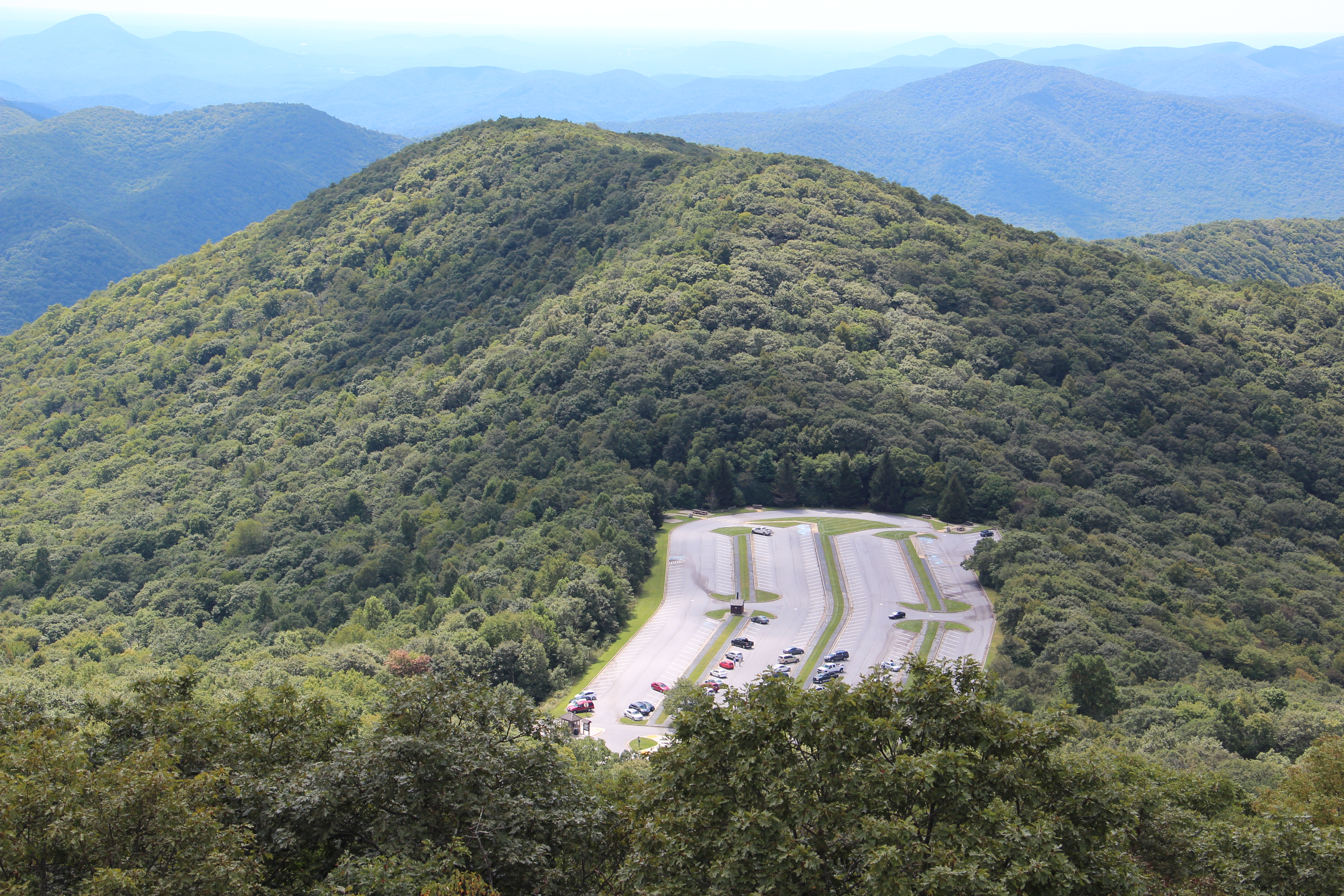
- Wolfpen Ridge viewed from Brasstown Bald

Highest point
- Elevation: 4,561 ft (1,390 m)
- Coordinates: 34°51′49″N 83°48′31″W

Geography
- Location: Towns / Union counties, Georgia, U.S.
- Parent range: Blue Ridge Mountains
- Topo map: USGS Jacks Gap

Climbing
- First ascent: unknown
- Easiest route: Hike

Wolfpen Ridge is a ridge in the Blue Ridge Mountains in U.S. state of Georgia that runs south to north along the boundary between Towns and Union counties. Brasstown Bald, the highest point in Georgia, is located at the northern end of the ridge (elevation: 4,786 feet (1,459 m)). At the southern end of the ridge, there is an unnamed peak with an elevation of 4,561 feet, which makes it the fifth-highest point in Georgia.

== See also ==
- List of mountains in Georgia (U.S. state)

== Sources ==
- Georgia Above 4,000 Feet
