= List of mountain passes in Georgia (U.S. state) =

This is a list of mountain gaps and passes in the U.S. state of Georgia.

== List ==
Name	Elevation		Location	USGS Topo Map			County	Nearest settlement	Coordinates
Name	ft	m	Location	1:24,000	1:100,000	1:250,000	County	Nearest settlement	Coordinates
Addis Gap	3,337	1,017					Rabun, Towns		
Ivylog Gap	2,795	852	CR 100 / CR 334 / Ivylog Gap Road west of Young Harris				Towns, Union		34°55′36″N 83°54′53″W
Jacks Gap			SR 180 / SR 180 Spur south of Brasstown Bald	Jacks Gap			Towns, Union		34°51′48″N 85°32′46″W
Magby Gap	1,388	423	SR 136 near Gass	Trenton	Chickamauga	Rome	Dade		34°51′48″N 85°32′46″W
Mulky Gap			Mulky Gap Road southwest of Blairsville				Union		34°47′56″N 84°02′25″W
Neels Gap			US 19 / US 129 / SR 11 northeast of Dahlonega	Neels Gap	Toccoa	Greenville	Lumpkin, Union		
Owltown Gap	2,228	679	Owltown Road near Owltown	Coosa Bald	Toccoa	Greenville	Union	Owltown	34°48′42″N 83°56′58″W
Tesnatee Gap							Union, White		
Unicoi Gap	2,953	900	SR 17 / SR 75 / Appalachian Trail north of Helen	Tray Mountain	Toccoa	Greenville	Towns, White		34°48′04″N 83°44′35″W
White Oak Gap	1,535	468	CR 6 / White Oak Gap Road southeast of Avans	New Home, Trenton	Chickamauga	Rome	Dade		34°52′31″N 85°32′07″W
Windy Gap							Dade		
Wolf Pen Gap	3,260	994	SR 180 / FR 39 west of Vogel State Park				Union	Suches	34°45′50″N 83°57′08″W

== See also ==
- List of counties in Georgia
