= Coosa Bald =

Mountain peak in Georgia, U.S.

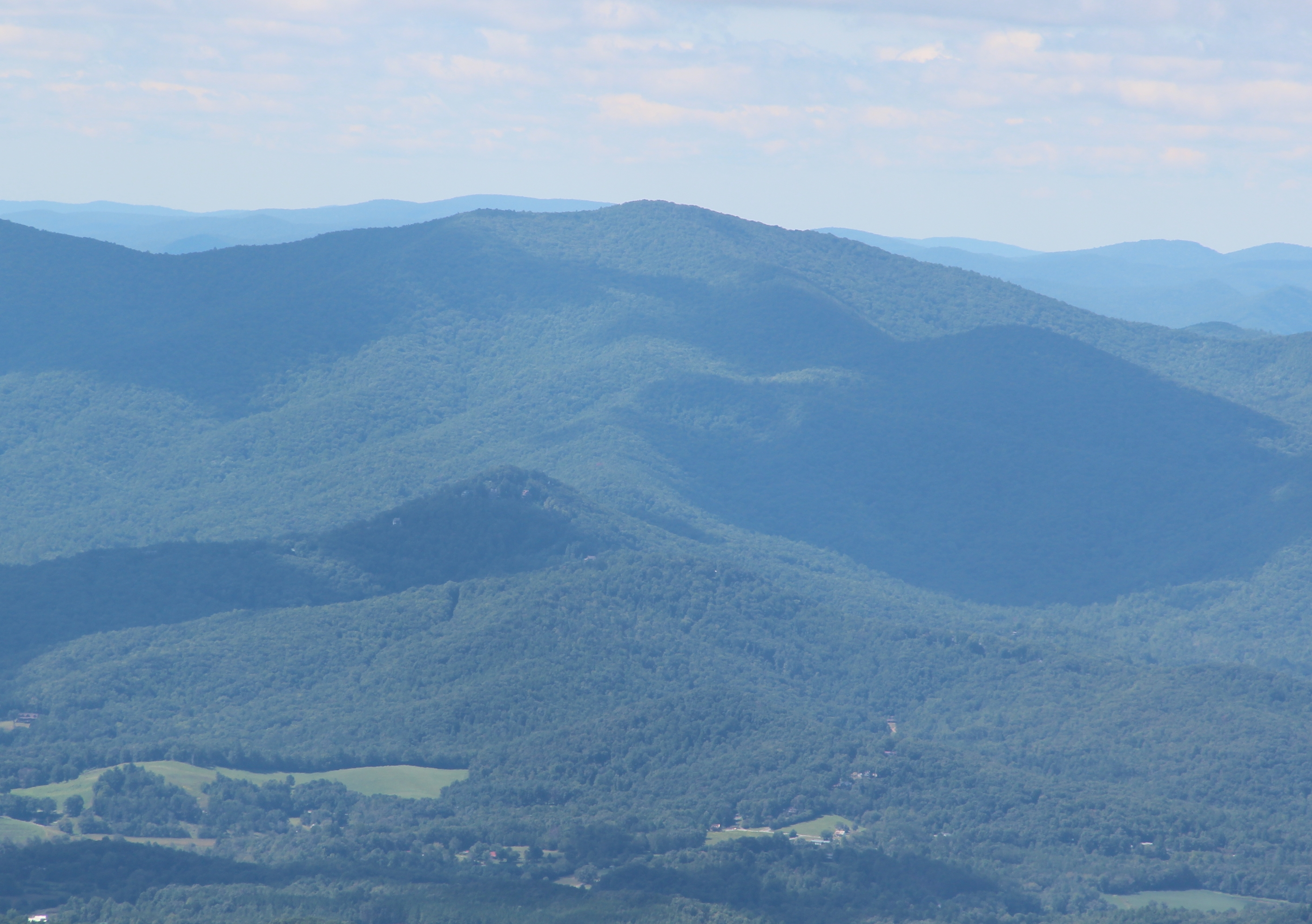
- Coosa Bald viewed from Brasstown Bald

Highest point
- Elevation: 4,280 ft (1,300 m)
- Listing: Mountains of Georgia
- Coordinates: 34°46′44″N 83°57′49″W

Geography
- Location within Georgia
- Location: Union County, Georgia, U.S.
- Parent range: Blue Ridge Mountains
- Topo map: USGS Coosa Bald

Climbing
- First ascent: unknown
- Easiest route: Duncan Ridge Trail

Coosa Bald, with an elevation of 4,280 feet (1,300 m), is tied with Double Spring Knob as the tenth-highest peak in Georgia. It is located in Union County and is the third-highest mountain in the county, behind Blood Mountain and Slaughter Mountain. Coosa Bald is located in the Chattahoochee National Forest and its peak is crossed by the Duncan Ridge Trail, a trail that connects with the Benton MacKaye Trail and the Appalachian Trail.
