= Double Spring Knob =

Mountain in Georgia, United States

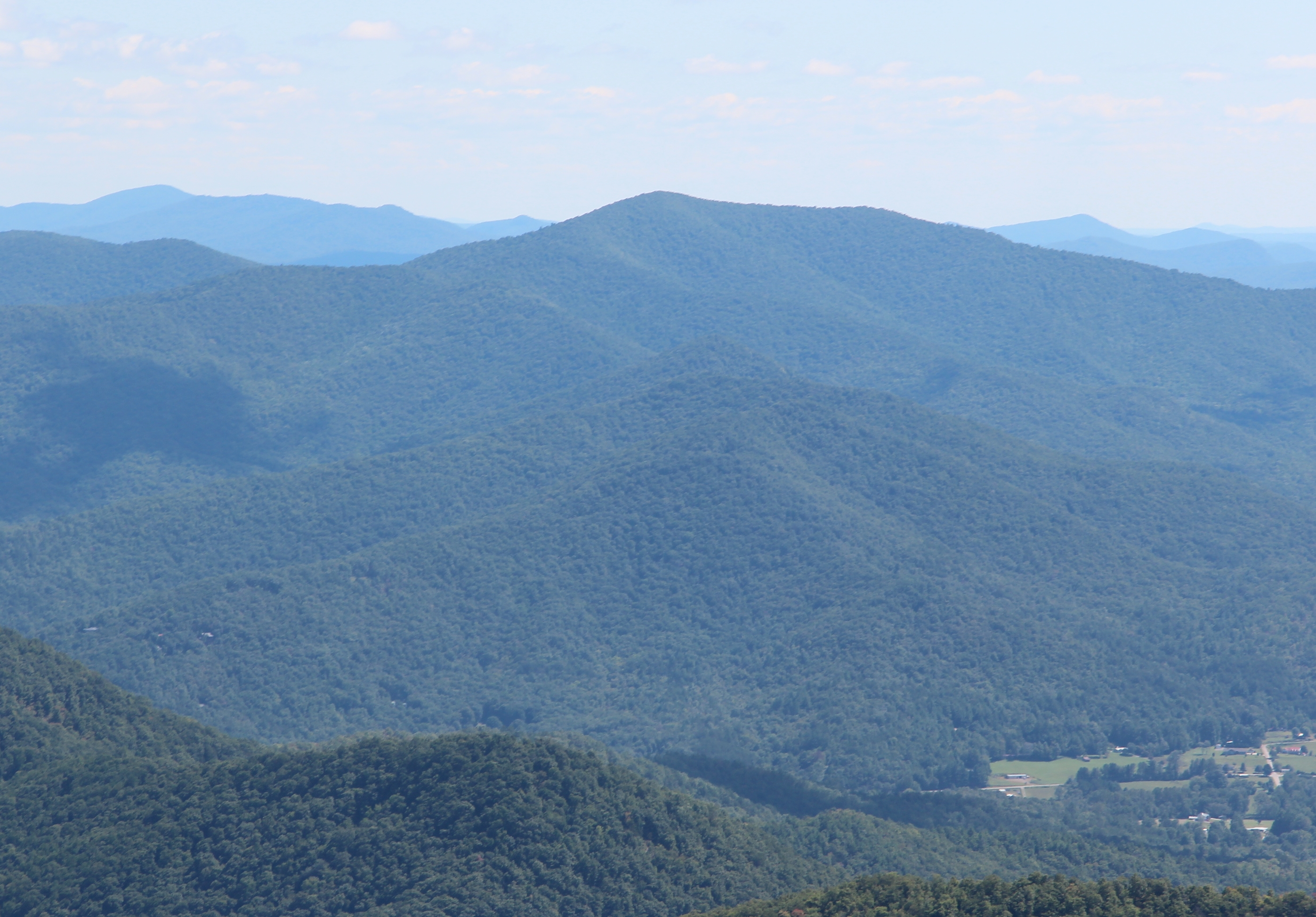
- Double Spring Knob viewed from Brasstown Bald

Highest point
- Elevation: 4,280 ft (1,300 m)
- Coordinates: 34°52′42″N 83°39′24″W

Geography
- Location: Rabun / Towns counties, Georgia, U.S.
- Parent range: Blue Ridge Mountains
- Topo map: USGS Macedonia

Climbing
- First ascent: unknown
- Easiest route: Hike

Double Spring Knob, with an elevation of 4,280 feet (1,305 m), is tied with Coosa Bald as the tenth-highest peak in Georgia, USA. It is located in two Georgia counties - Rabun and Towns. It is located within the boundaries of the Chattahoochee National Forest. The Appalachian Trail passes below the knob to the east. This mountain is also known as Kelly Knob.

== See also ==
- List of mountains in Georgia (U.S. state)
