= Wauka Mountain =

Mountain in Georgia, United States

- Location within Georgia

Highest point
- Elevation: 2,579 ft (786 m)
- Listing: Mountains of Georgia
- Coordinates: 34°30′34″N 83°48′24″W

Geography
- Country: United States
- State: Georgia
- Counties: Hall and White
- Topo map: USGS Cleveland

Wauka Mountain is a summit in the U.S. state of Georgia. The elevation is 2,579 feet (786 m).

A variant name is "Walker Mountain". The summit derives its name from Richard Walker, a pioneer citizen.
