= Big John Dick Mountain =

Summit in Fannin County, Georgia, United States

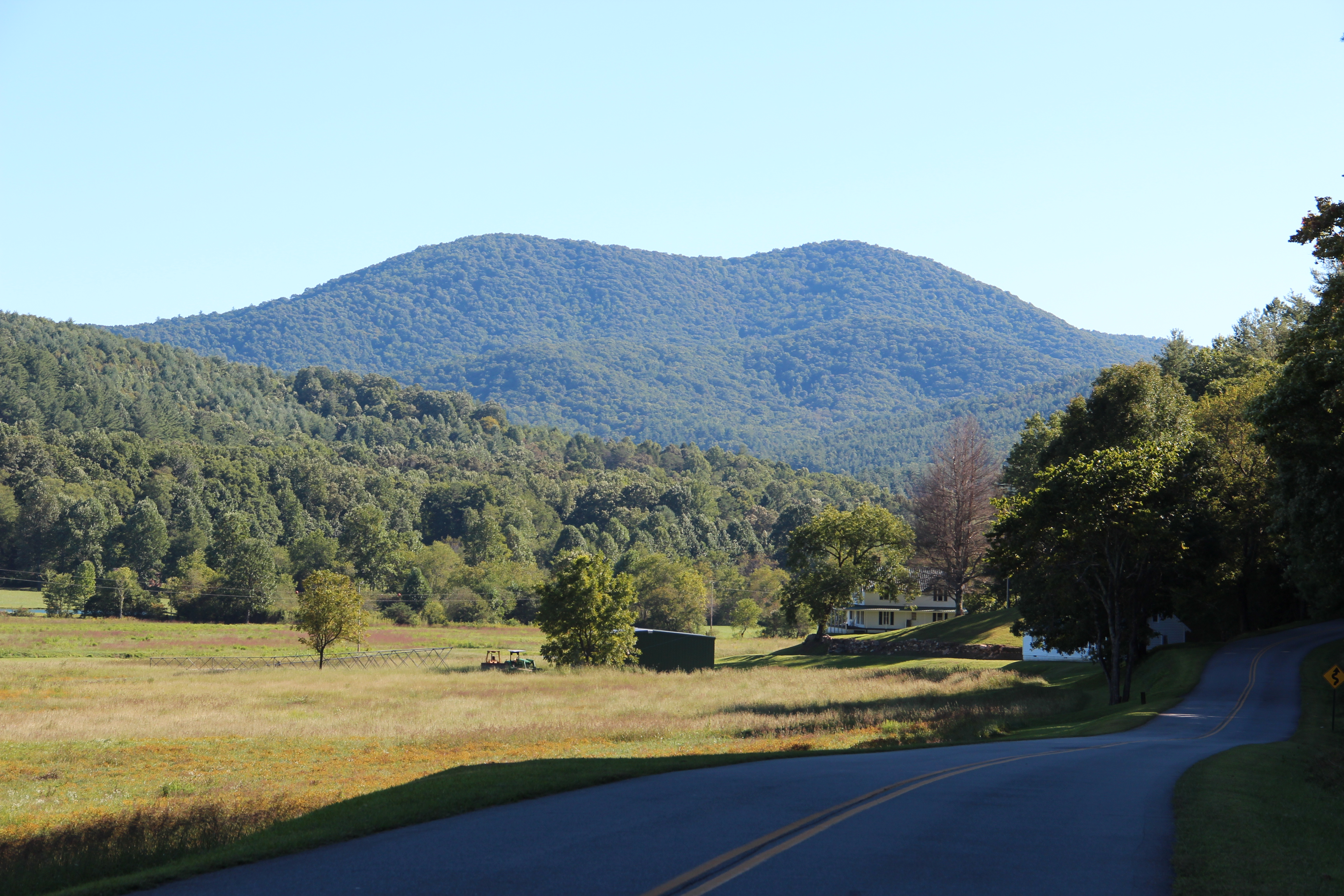
- Big John Dick Mountain, viewed from the north

Highest point
- Elevation: 3,278 ft (999 m)
- Listing: Mountains of Georgia
- Coordinates: 34°42′33″N 84°11′23″W

Geography
- Location within Georgia
- Location: Location of Big John Dick Mountain in Georgia
- Topo map: USGS Noontootla

Big John Dick Mountain is a summit in Fannin County, Georgia, in the United States. With an elevation of 3,278 feet (999 m), Big John Dick Mountain is the 196th tallest mountain in Georgia.

The mountain is located 11 miles (18 km) south-southeast of Morganton. The Benton MacKaye Trail passes near the summit of the mountain.

== See also ==
- List of mountains in Georgia (U.S. state)
