= Alcovy Mountain =

Mountain in Georgia, United States

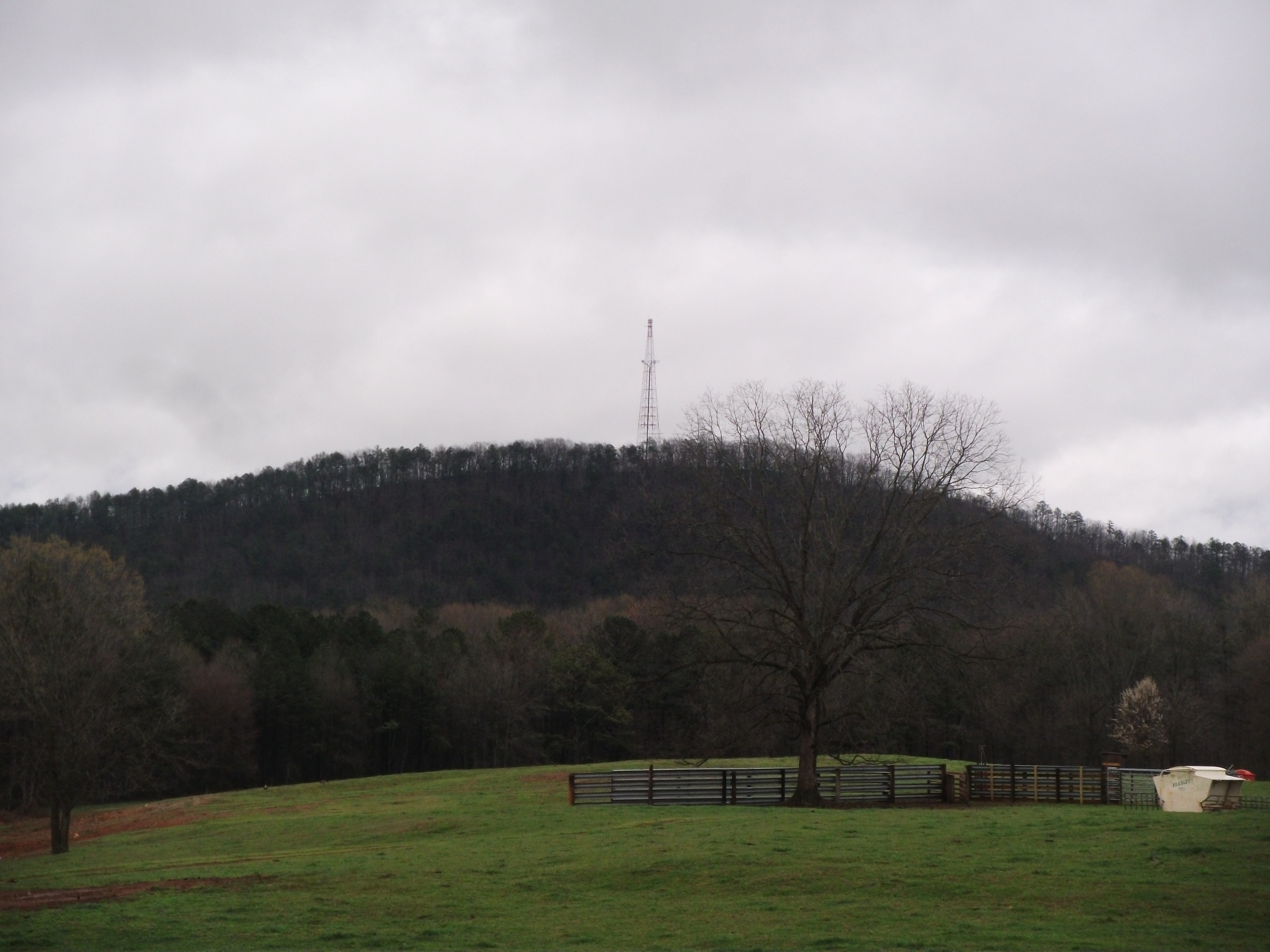
- Alcovy Mountain Topo

Highest point
- Elevation: 1,088 ft (332 m) NAVD 88
- Prominence: 308 ft (94 m) NAVD 88
- Listing: Mountains of Georgia
- Coordinates: 33°43′57″N 83°44′41″W

Geography
- Location within Georgia
- Location: Walton County, Georgia, U.S.
- Parent range: Appalachian Mountains
- Topo map: USGS Monroe

Alcovy Mountain stands as a geological and geographical highlight in Georgia. This monadnock, similar to Kennesaw Mountain in Marietta, rises prominently in Walton County about four miles south of Monroe. With a summit elevation of 1,088 ft (332 m), it holds the title of the highest point in Walton County. Furthermore, it marks the southeastern-most mountain of significance in the Appalachian mountain range.

The terrain around the mountain averages roughly 750 feet (230 m) AMSL. Alcovy (pronunciation: al-CO-vee) Mountain rises steeply from the banks of the Alcovy River, which arises farther north, in Gwinnett County.

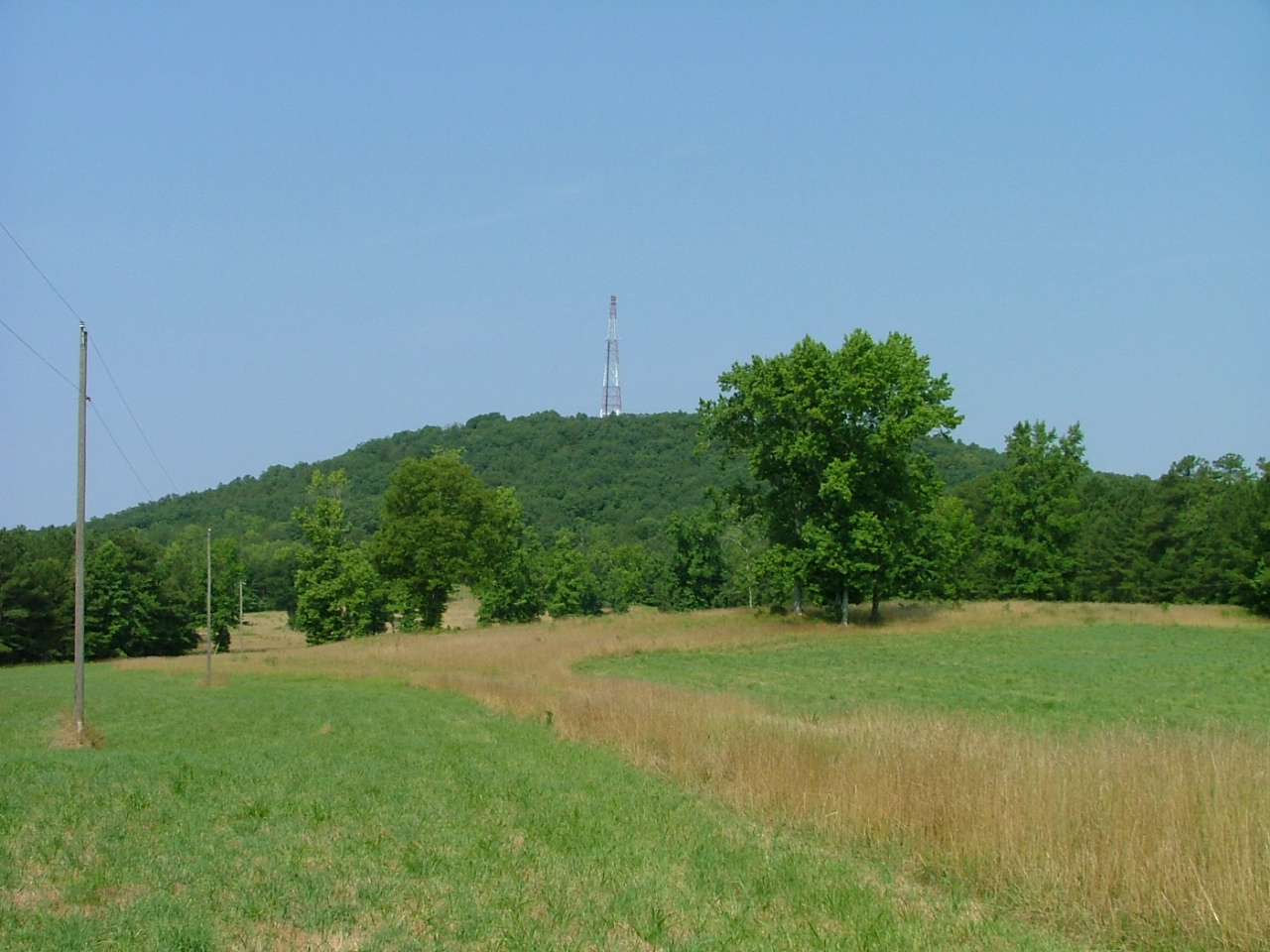
View of Alcovy from the eastern, less prominent face

== History ==
The name of Alcovy Mountain comes from the river that flows north to south directly west of the mountain. The native Muskogean Indians named the river "Ulcofauchatchie", meaning "a river among the bog potato", otherwise known as the pawpaw tree. As different accented tongues of European immigrants settled in this area, "Alcovy" later became the name. Although this river flows for over 50 miles until its confluence as a tributary of the Ocmulgee River, these lowland "bog potato" swamps occur for just less than a dozen miles around the mountain. Today, like several other low mountains in the area, Alcovy is privately owned and access is prohibited. However, twenty miles West in southeast Atlanta are three other monadnocks that are protected. These mountains have large rock outcrops that have merited their conservation. They are Arabia Mountain, Panola Mountain, and Stone Mountain.
