= Double Knob =

Mountain in Georgia, United States

Coordinates: 34.8089722°N 84.4393700°W

Double Knob is a summit in the U.S. state of Georgia. The elevation is 2,434 feet (742 m).

Double Knob was descriptively named on account of its double-peaked outline. A variant name is "Double Knob Mountain".
