= Rich Mountain Wilderness =

Wilderness area in Georgia, United States

- IUCN category Ib (wilderness area)
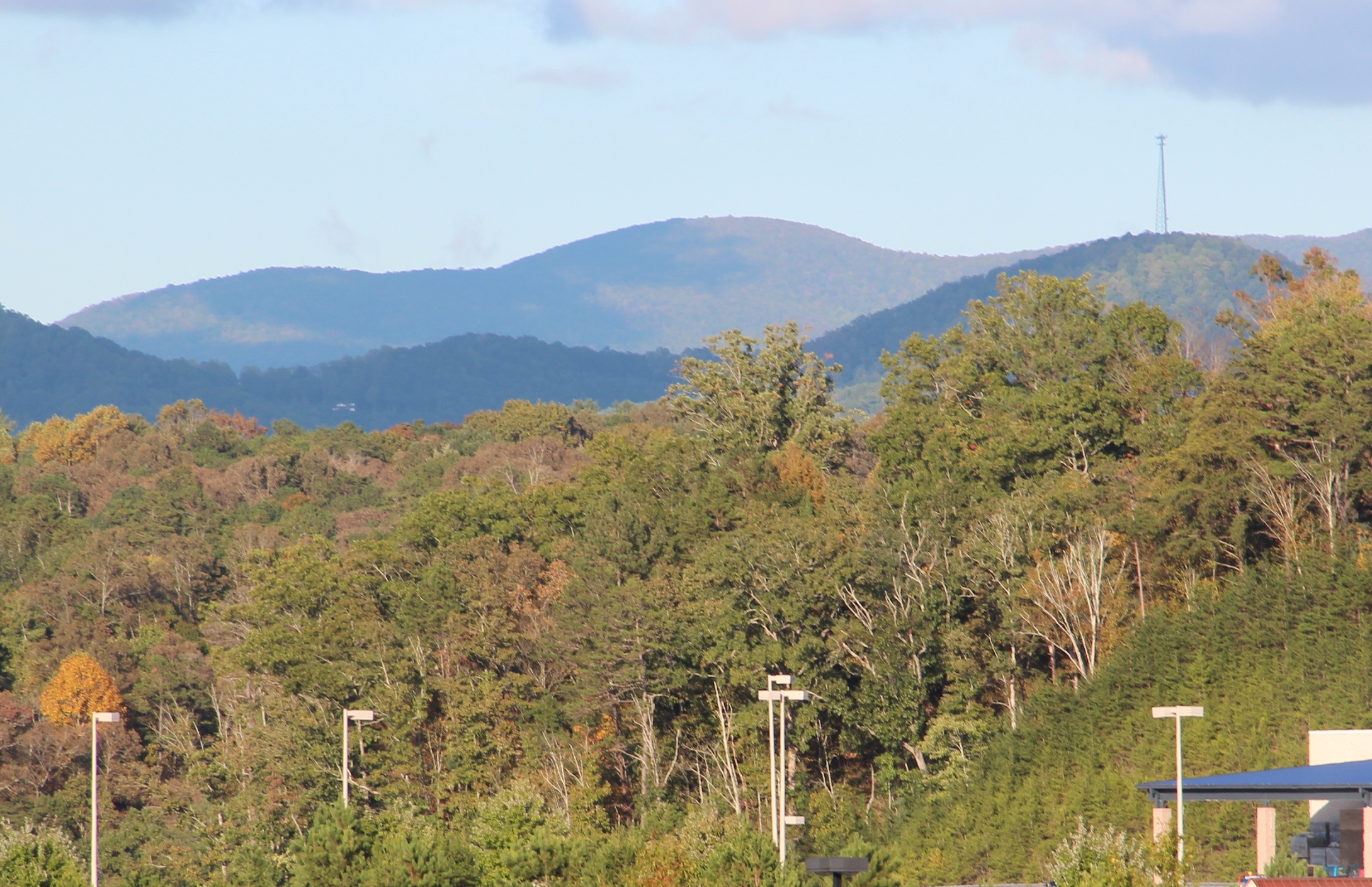
- Rich Mountain

- Location within Georgia Location within the United States
- Location: Gilmer County, Georgia, USA
- Nearest city: Ellijay, GA
- Coordinates: 34°43′49″N 84°20′26″W
- Area: 9,476 acres (3,835 ha)
- Established: 1986
- Governing body: U.S. Forest Service

The Rich Mountain Wilderness is a wilderness area within the Chattahoochee National Forest in Gilmer County, Georgia, in the United States. It was designated in 1986 and currently consists of 9,476 acres (38.35 km^{2}) of the 13,276 acres (54 km^{2}) that makes up the Rich Mountains. The Wilderness is managed by the United States Forest Service and is part of the National Wilderness Preservation System.

The highest elevation in the Rich Mountain Wilderness is the 4,050-foot (1,234 m) peak of Rich Mountain. The land that forms the Wilderness is characterized by the same sort of deep, black porter's loam found in the Cohutta Mountains. The Wilderness is home to several threatened or endangered species.
