= Yonah Mountain =

Mountain in Georgia, United States

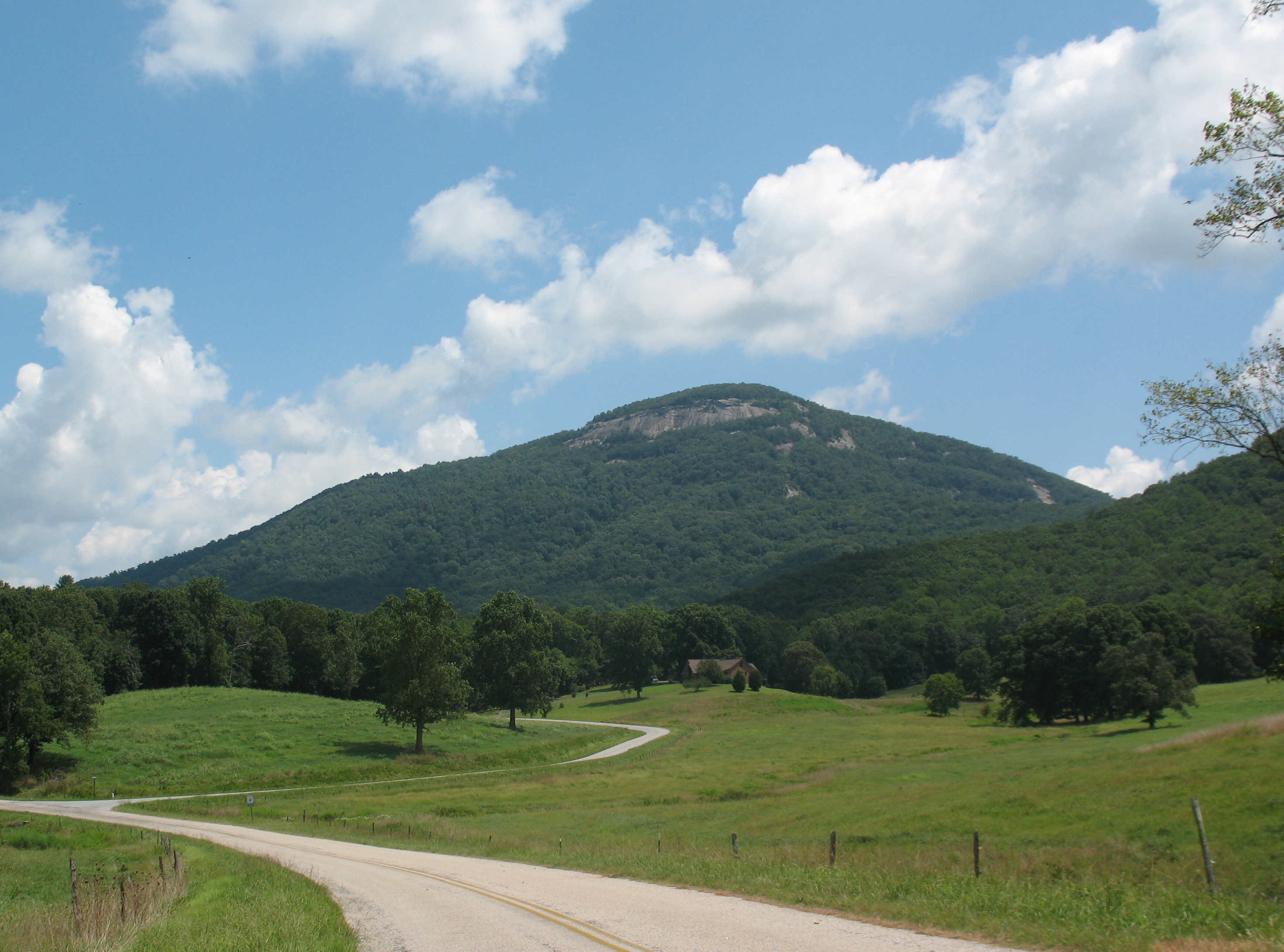
- Yonah Mountain in summer.

Highest point
- Elevation: 3,166 ft (965 m)
- Coordinates: 34°38′15″N 83°42′49″W

Geography
- Location: White County, Georgia U.S.
- Topo map: USGS Helen (GA)

Geology
- Mountain type: granite

Climbing
- Easiest route: climb

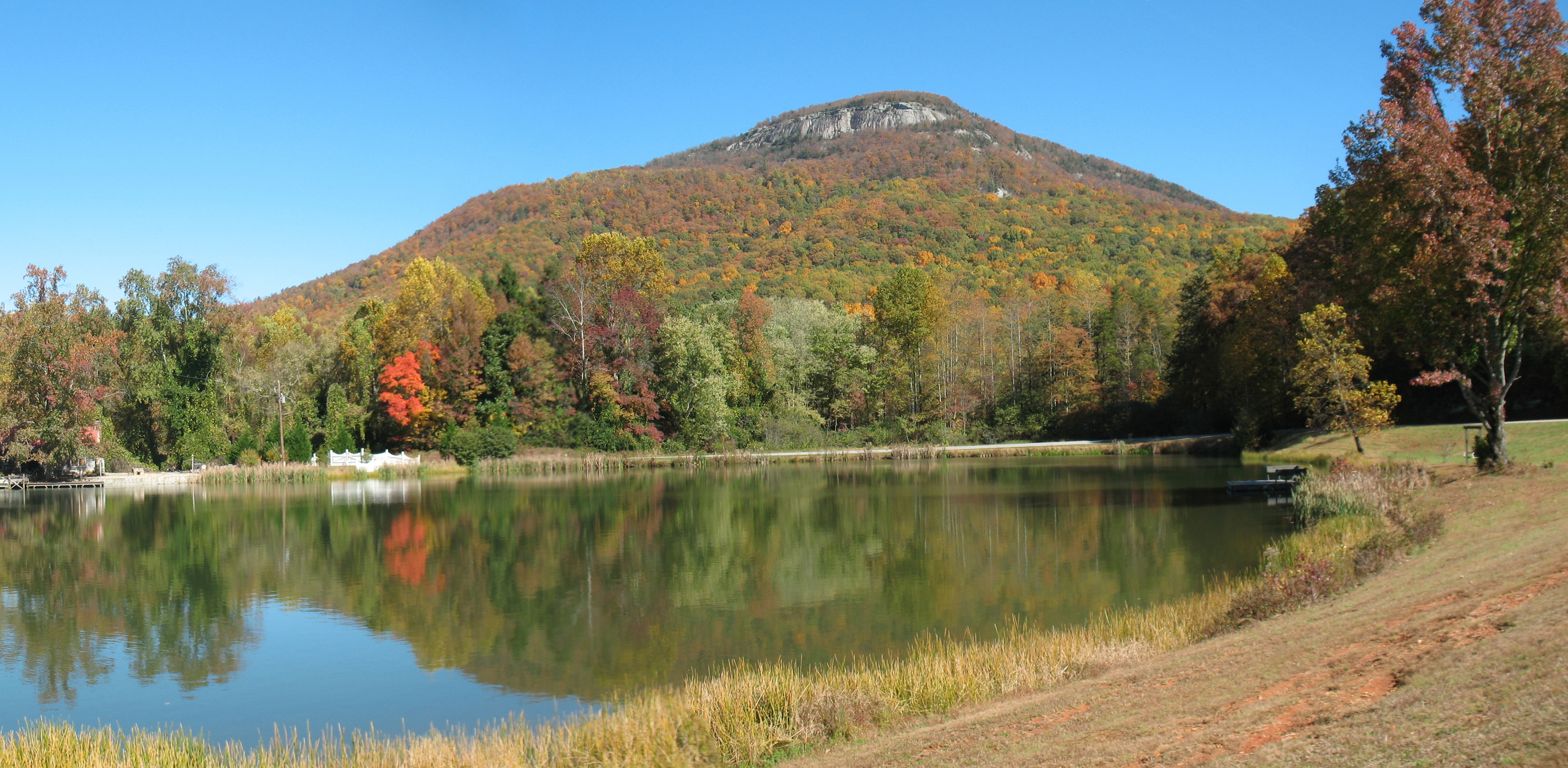
Yonah Mountain from Chambers Lake

Yonah Mountain (commonly referred to as "Mount Yonah" or, by older Georgians, "Yonah Bald") is a mountain ridge located in the Chattahoochee-Oconee National Forest in Georgia, United States. It is between the cities of Cleveland and Helen. Yonah is the Cherokee word for Bear.

There is a signed trailhead from Chambers Road and an approximately 2.3 mile trail (gaining 1500 feet in elevation) leads to the summit. There are also side trails that lead to neighboring Pink Mountain.

The 5th Ranger Training Battalion, Ranger Training Brigade of the United States Army conducts the Mountain Phase of Ranger School on Yonah Mountain. It has been a popular training ground for rock climbers.

Like Lookout Mountain's Rock City, Yonah Mountain is the site of a Native American legend about a beautiful Cherokee maiden named Nacoochee who fell in love with the Chickasaw warrior Sautee. When their love was forbidden by their tribal elders, a war party followed the eloping lovers and threw Sautee off the mountain, with Nacoochee then jumping to her death, a Lover's Leap. Although he did not invent the legend, George Williams, the son of one of the original white settlers, popularized it in his 1871 Sketches of Travel in the Old and New World.
