= Blackjack Mountain (Carroll County, Georgia) =

Mountain in Georgia, United States

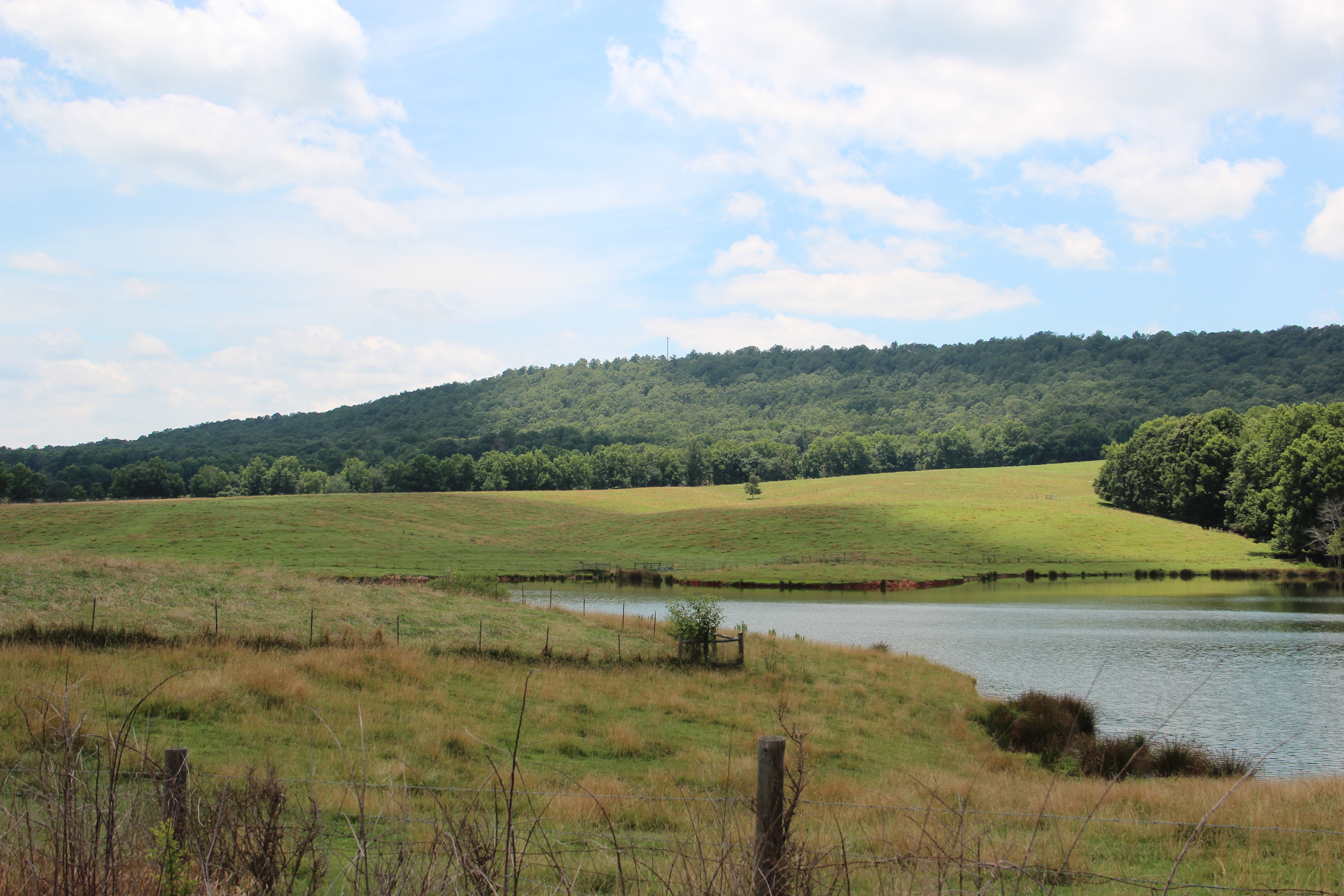
- Blackjack Mountain, viewed from the east

Highest point
- Elevation: 1,545 ft (471 m) NGVD 29
- Prominence: 445 ft (136 m) NGVD 29
- Listing: County high point
- Coordinates: 33°26′12″N 85°15′57″W

Geography
- Location within Georgia
- Location: Carroll County, Georgia, U.S.
- Parent range: Appalachian Mountains
- Topo map: USGS Graham

Blackjack Mountain is a scenic landmark, located in the very southwest corner of Carroll County, Georgia on the Georgia-Alabama border and Heard County line. The nearest city is Ephesus, Georgia, 2.2 miles (3.5 km) to the south.

While not an impressive mountain, at 1,545 ft (471 m) the summit is the highest point in Georgia south of Interstate 20. Blackjack Mountain is a long north–south trending ridge. The Native Americans used this promontory as a reference point on their east–west trading path and are believed to have used the summit for sacred ceremonies. The mountain was named for its blackjack oak timber.

== Conservation ==
In 2003, Carroll County earmarked about $19 million for land conservation, parks and recreation. Blackjack Mountain was a high land conservation priority. In early 2005, the Trust for Public Land (TPL) helped the county protect Blackjack Mountain. The acquisition of Blackjack Mountain will protect a very scenic viewshed and preserve over 312 acres (1.26 km^{2}) of pines and mixed hardwoods, two small lakes, several small tributaries, a federally designated wetland and a valuable wildlife habitat. Blackjack is named for all of the Blackjack oaks that grow on it.
