= Flat Top (Georgia) =

Mountain in Georgia, USA

Coordinates: 34°57′04″N 83°18′56″W

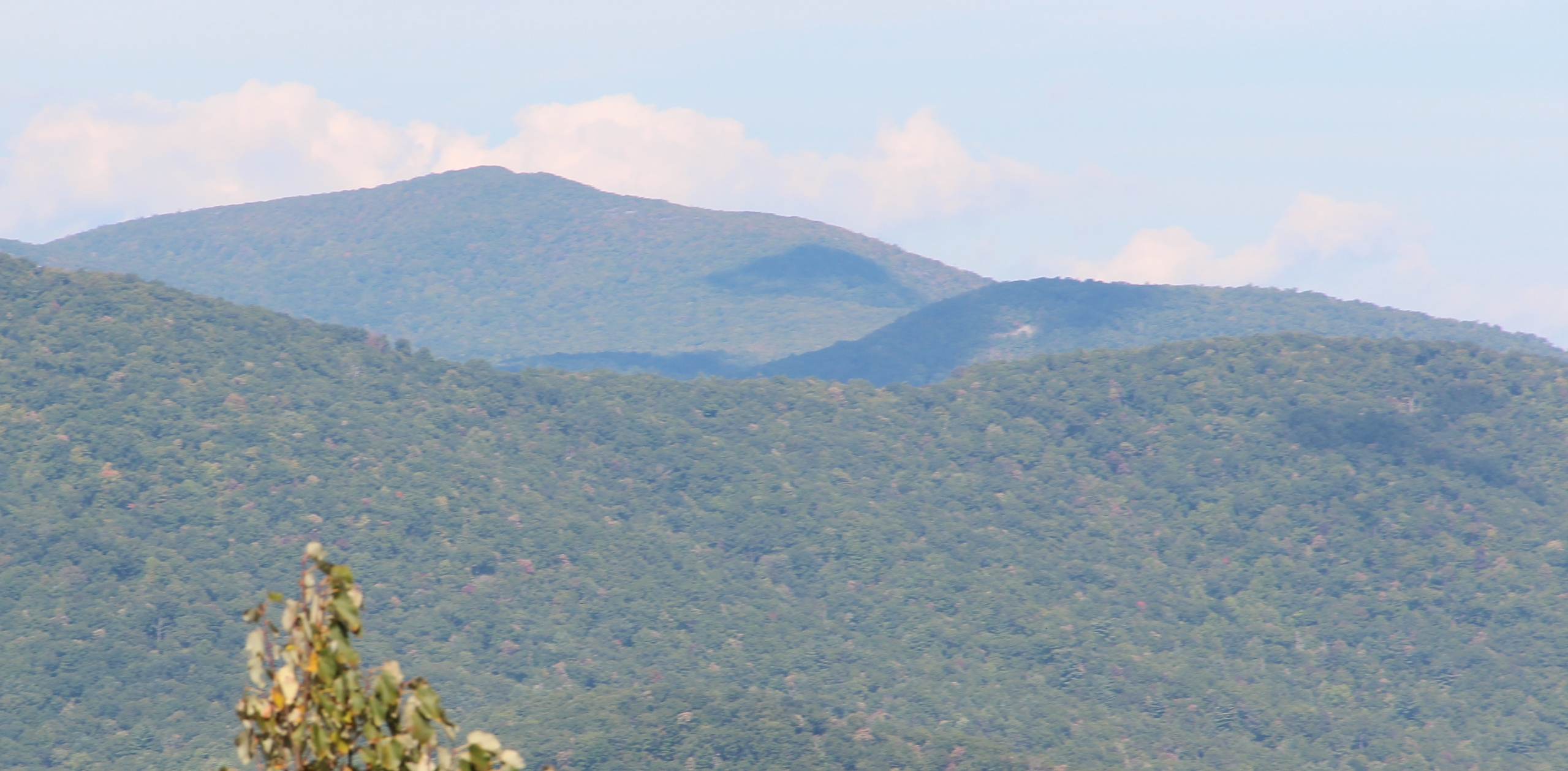
Rabun Bald (left) and Flat Top (right), viewed from Black Rock Mountain State Park

Flat Top, with an elevation of 4,142 feet, is the 20th-highest peak in Georgia, United States. It is located in Rabun County, Georgia and is within the boundaries of the Chattahoochee National Forest. There is a view of the rock face of Flat Top from the Bartram Trail.

== See also ==
- List of mountains in Georgia (U.S. state)
