= Glassy Mountain (Pickens County, South Carolina) =

Mountain in South Carolina, United States

Coordinates: 34°54′03″N 82°39′33″W

Highest point
- Elevation: 1,703 ft (519 m)

Geography
- Location: Pickens County, South Carolina, U.S.
- Topo map: USGS Saluda

Glassy Mountain is a mountain close to Pickens, South Carolina, USA, in northwestern South Carolina, with a summit elevation of 1,703 feet (519 m) above mean sea level. While it is an isolated monadnock, it is still close to the Blue Ridge, providing views of nearby summits such as Table Rock and Caesar's Head as well as Greenville. The mountain gets its name from a large, bare, granite face on its north side. At the top of this rock face are small springs that trickle down the mountain, giving it a "glassy" appearance in the sun. It is easily accessible, as a small service road for transmitter towers leads to the summit. Local high schoolers often paint the rock face with graduation years. These year numbers can be so large as to be seen on aerial imaging of the mountain

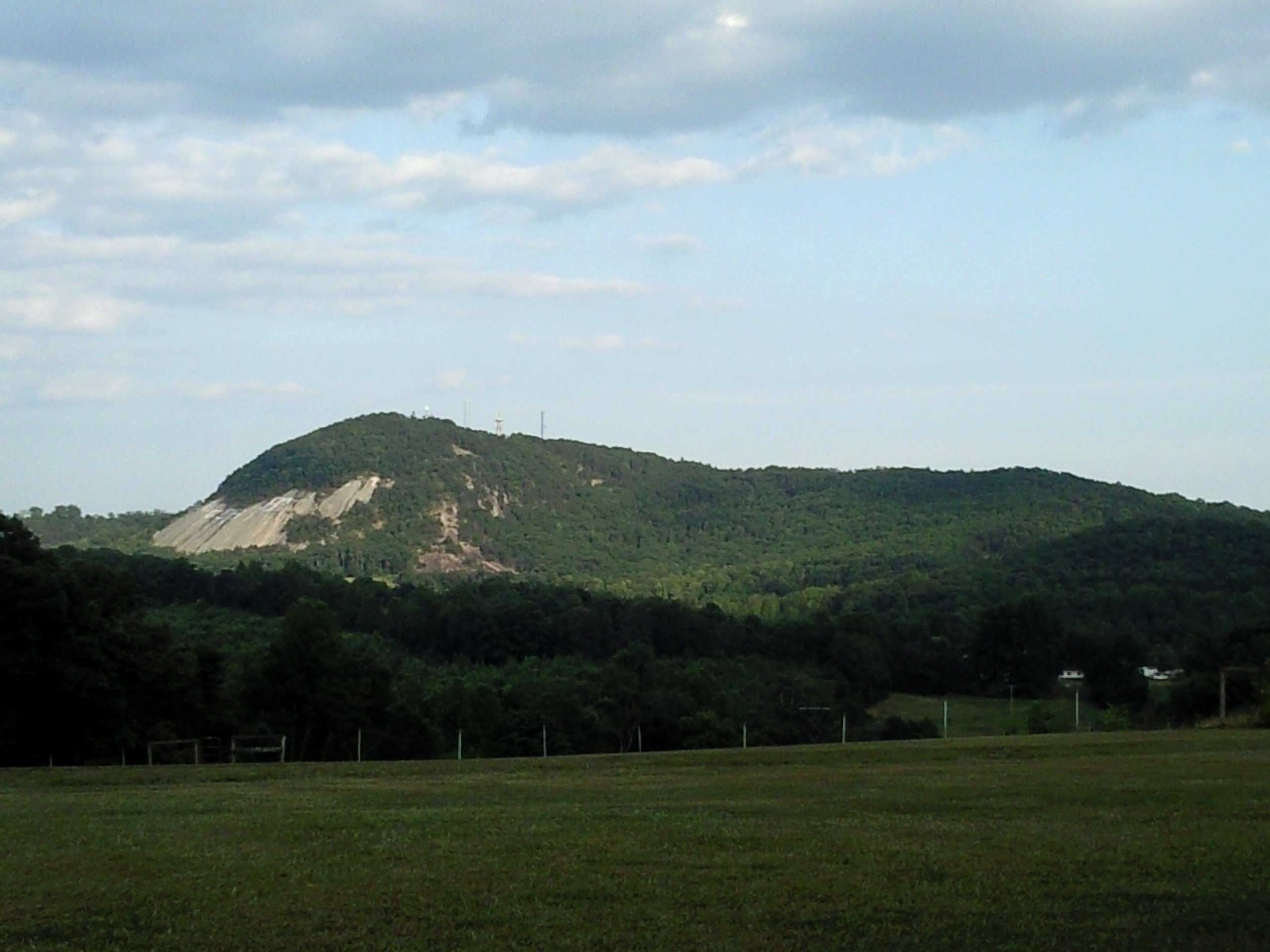
Glassy Mountain in Pickens County, SC

This mountain is often confused with another Glassy Mountain located in Greenville County, South Carolina, which is nearby. Glassy Mountain in Greenville County has a higher elevation of 2,782 feet and is not a monadnock as it is connected to other mountains. It is also home to the Cliffs at Glassy Mountain golf course community.

In 1990, owners Pat McCoy and Thomas Atkinson sold Glassy Mountain to the South Carolina Heritage Trust Program, which designated it Glass Mountain Heritage Preserve.
