= Cherry Log, Georgia =

- Unincorporated community Census-designated place
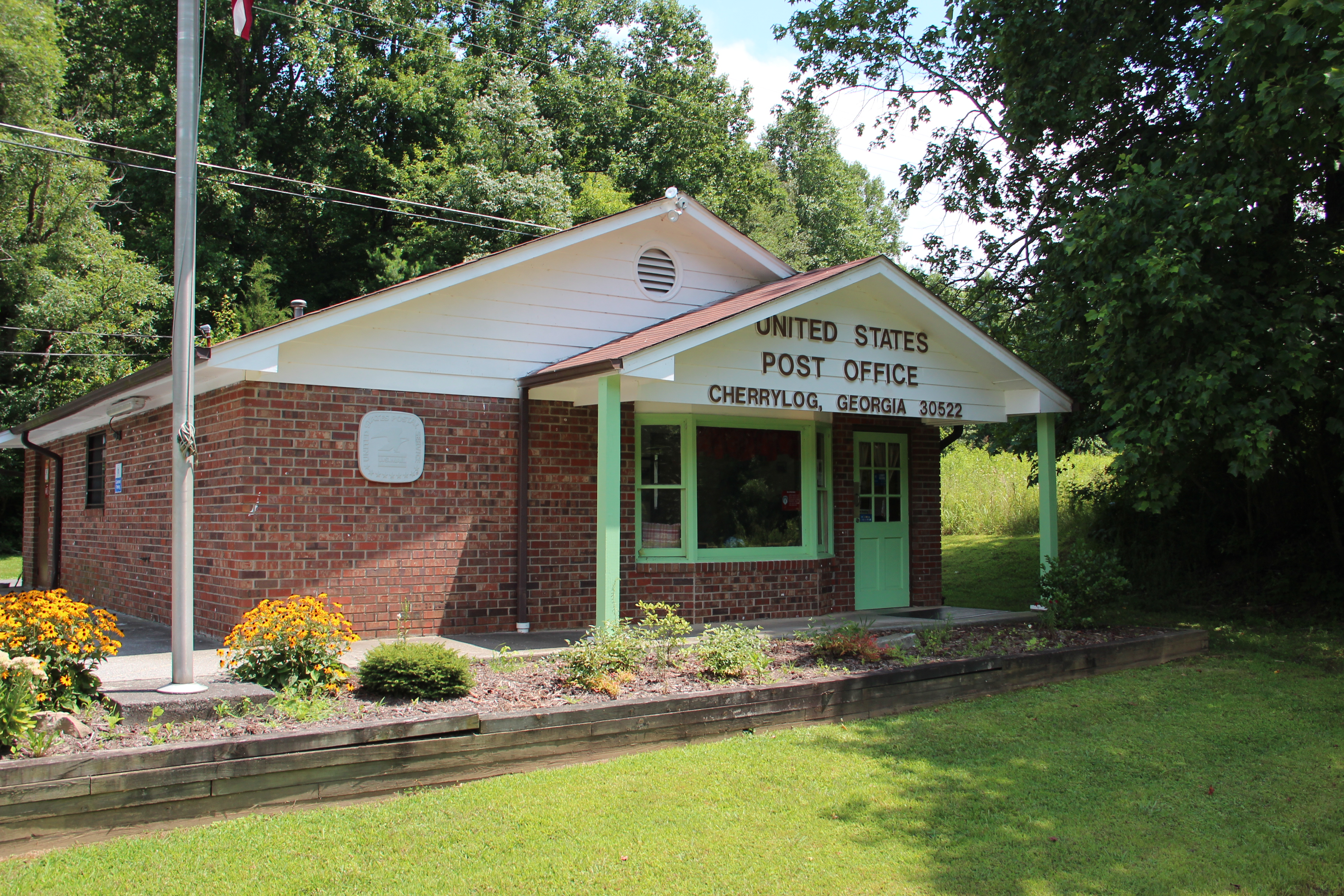
- Cherry Log post office

- Location within Georgia Location within the United States
- Coordinates: 34°46′49″N 84°23′27″W
- Country: United States
- State: Georgia
- County: Gilmer

Area
  - Total: 1.14 sq mi (2.96 km^{2})
  - Land: 1.14 sq mi (2.94 km^{2})
  - Water: 0.0077 sq mi (0.02 km^{2})
- Elevation: 1,670 ft (510 m)

Population (2020)
  - Total: 99
  - Density: 87.2/sq mi (33.66/km^{2})
- Time zone: UTC-5 (Eastern (EST))
  - Summer (DST): UTC-4 (EDT)
- ZIP code: 30522
- Area codes: 706 & 762
- GNIS feature ID: 2587029

Cherry Log is an unincorporated community and census-designated place (CDP) in Gilmer County, Georgia, United States. Its population was 99 as of the 2020 census. Cherry Log has a post office with ZIP code 30522. U.S. Route 76 passes through the community. Through the heart of Cherry Log runs Cherry Log Street, on which several services and businesses may be found. These include Cherry Log the Post Office, Cornerstone Baptist Church, Cherry Log Christian Church, and the Pink Pig, a restaurant in operation since 1950.

"Cherry Log" is the English translation of the former Cherokee village which once stood at the present town site.

In 2016, the Expedition Bigfoot: The Sasquatch Museum opened in Cherry Log.

== Demographics ==
Historical population
Census	Pop.	Note	%±
2010	119		—
2020	99		−16.8%
U.S. Decennial Census; 1850-1870 1870-1880; 1890-1910 1920-1930; 1940 1950 1960; 1970 1980 1990; 2000 2010 2020

Cherry Log was first listed as a census designated place in the 2010 U.S. census.

Cherry Log CDP, Georgia – Racial and ethnic composition Note: the US Census treats Hispanic/Latino as an ethnic category. This table excludes Latinos from the racial categories and assigns them to a separate category. Hispanics/Latinos may be of any race.
Race / Ethnicity (NH = Non-Hispanic)	Pop 2010	Pop 2020	% 2010	% 2020
White alone (NH)	118	93	99.16%	93.94%
Black or African American alone (NH)	0	2	0.00%	2.02%
Native American or Alaska Native alone (NH)	0	0	0.00%	0.00%
Asian alone (NH)	0	0	0.00%	0.00%
Pacific Islander alone (NH)	0	0	0.00%	0.00%
Some Other Race alone (NH)	0	1	0.00%	1.01%
Mixed Race or Multi-Racial (NH)	1	1	0.84%	1.01%
Hispanic or Latino (any race)	0	2	0.00%	2.02%
Total	119	99	100.00%	100.00%
