= Glassy Mountain (Georgia) =

Mountain in Georgia, United States

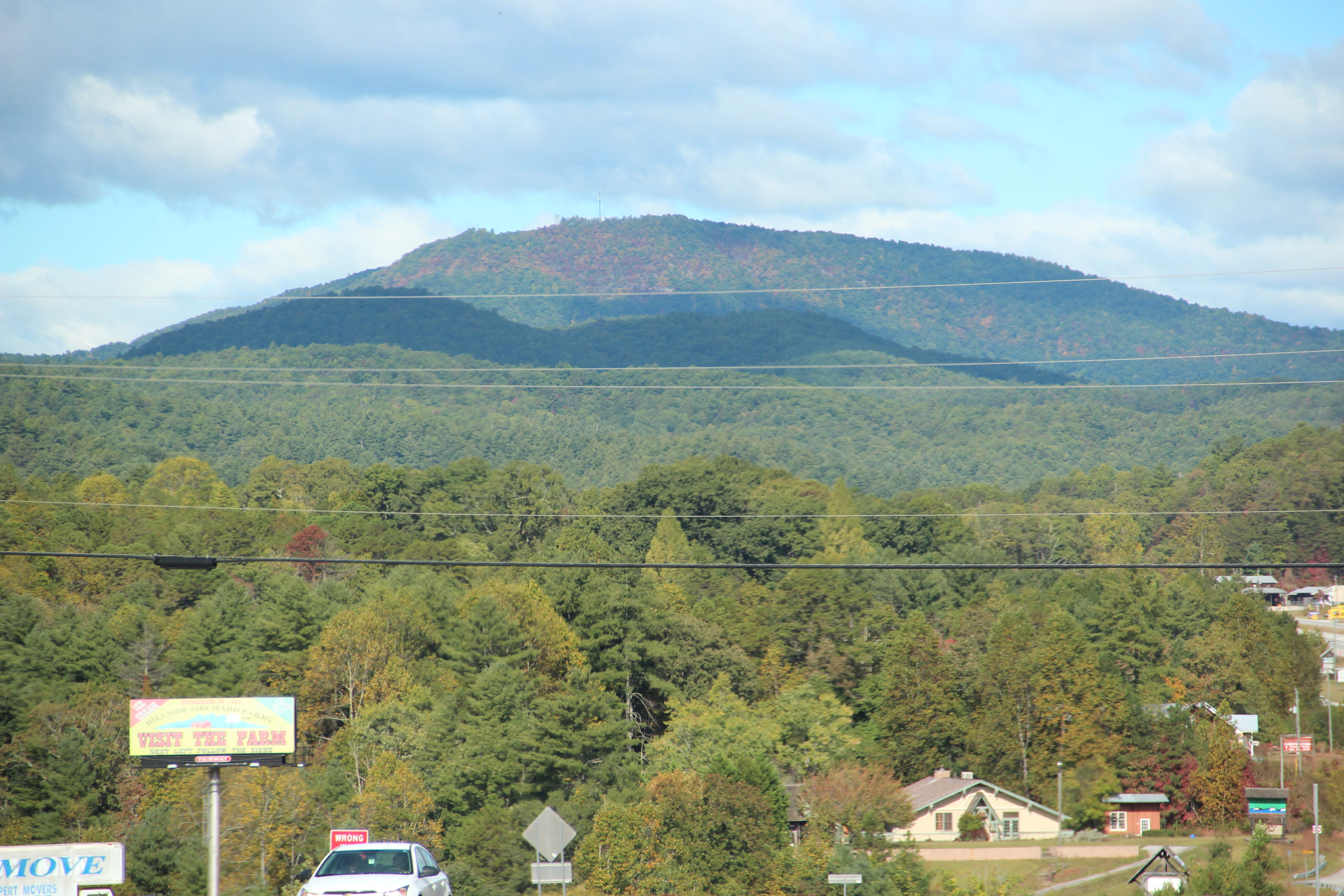
Glassy Mountain in October

Glassy Mountain is a mountain in the Chattahoochee National Forest in Rabun County, Georgia, with its USGS GNIS summit at 34°50′44″N 83°30′02″W, which is 3,415 feet (1,041 m) AMSL. It is bypassed on its northern flank by a major two-lane highway that carries U.S. Route 76 and Georgia State Route 2 east and west.

It is also the location of NOAA Weather Radio station KXI81, which serves nearby Clayton, Georgia (to the east-northeast), Lake Burton (to the west and southwest), and adjacent areas of northeast Georgia, upstate South Carolina, and western North Carolina.

A radio tower and a fire lookout tower are both located atop the mountain. The fire tower was built at Glassy Mountain in 1941. The forest service added a residence and garage in the 1960s.

== See also ==
- List of mountains in Georgia (U.S. state)
