= Screamer Mountain =

Mountain in Georgia, United States

Coordinates: 34°52′23″N 83°22′32″W

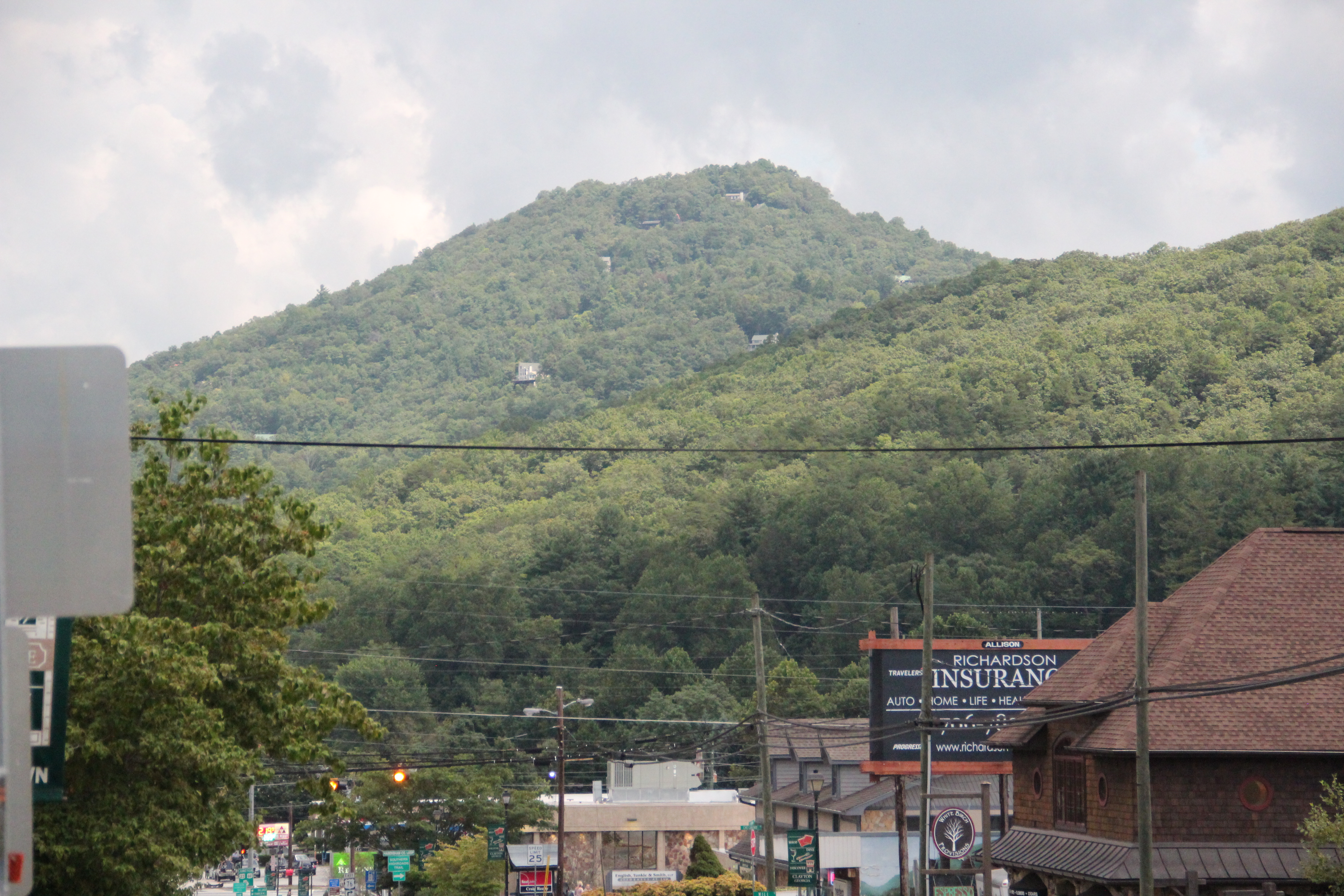
Screamer Mountain viewed from Clayton

Screamer Mountain is a mountain in Rabun County, Georgia, United States, near Clayton, Georgia and is the birthplace of Logan E. Bleckley. Screamer Mountain has an elevation of 2,972 feet. The entire mountain was purchased in 1971, by Modern States Life Insurance Co.

There are two versions of the legend of how the mountain got its name. One Cherokee legend is that a Native American woman once screamed at the top of the mountain all night long. Another legend is that a woman leaped to her death from the mountaintop rather than be removed from the state at the beginning of the Trail of Tears in 1838.
