= Gebhardt =

Gebhardt is a German surname. Notable people with the surname include:

- Deborah Gebhardt, American basketball coach and scientist
- Dixie Cornell Gebhardt (1866–1955), American designer of the state flag of Iowa
- Eric "Red Mouth" Gebhardt, American singer-songwriter
- Eduard von Gebhardt (1838–1925), Baltic German historical painter
- Elke Gebhardt (born 1983), German racing cyclist
- Evelyne Gebhardt (born 1954), German politician
- Georg Gebhardt (1901–1975), German military officer during World War II
- George Gebhardt (1879–1919), Swiss-born American silent film actor
- Håkon Gebhardt (born 1969), Norwegian musician and record producer
- Karl Gebhardt (1897–1948), German Nazi SS physician who conducted criminal medical experiments, executed for war crimes
- Liz Gebhardt (1945–1996), English actress
- Marcel Gebhardt (born 1979), German footballer
- Marco Gebhardt (born 1972), German footballer
- Mike Gebhardt (born 1965), American sailor
- Miriam Gebhardt (born 1962), German architect and writer
- Oscar von Gebhardt (1844–1906), German Lutheran theologian
- Richard Gebhardt (1931-2017), American politician
- Rio Gebhardt (1907–1944), German pianist, conductor and composer
- Robert Gebhardt (1920–1986), German footballer and manager
- Stanisław Gebhardt (1928–2025), Polish resistance fighter and economist
- Steffen Gebhardt (born 1981), German pentathlete
- Volk Gebhardt, 16th-century Slovenian politician

== See also ==
- A.L. Gebhardt & Co., a leather tanning company that operated in Milwaukee, Wisconsin and Berlin, Germany
- Gephardt
