= Charles F. Pfister =

American businessman (1859–1927)

- Charles F. Pfister, Wisconsin Historical Society collections

Chairman of the Wisconsin Republican Party

Personal details
- Born: June 17, 1859 Milwaukee, Wisconsin, U.S.
- Died: November 12, 1927 (aged 68)
- Resting place: Forest Home Cemetery
- Party: Republican
- Profession: banker, corporate director, hotelier, utility owner, publisher

Charles F. Pfister (June 17, 1859 – November 12, 1927) was a wealthy tannery magnate, bank financier, utility owner, newspaper publisher, hotelier and philanthropist in Milwaukee, Wisconsin. He was also a central figure in the stalwart "Old Guard" of the Republican Party of Wisconsin during the rise of the state's progressive Republicans. Although never a political candidate himself, Pfister advised on tactics and used his vast holdings to fund the party's operations, dictate favored legislation, and re-edit the opinion pages of Wisconsin newspapers. A lifelong bachelor, Pfister belonged to many clubs and organizations but shunned the spotlight. He donated much of his fortune to local arts groups and charities.

== Early life and career ==
Charles Frederick Pfister was born as Charles Frederick Weisert in Milwaukee on June 17, 1859; in 1870, he was adopted by Guido Pfister, an emigre from Württemberg, Germany. Guido's cousin and fellow emigre Frederick Vogel founded a tannery on Milwaukee's Menominee River while Pfister opened a shoe store on nearby West Water Street. Combining forces as the Pfister & Vogel Leather Company, their company thrived, becoming one of the largest leather producers in the country.

Charles Pfister was educated at the city's Engelmann Academy (later the German-English Academy, which Pfister paid to rebuild and dedicated to his father in 1891). After his 1876 graduation he went to work in his father's business offices. In 1878 he became the sales manager of the company's retail shoe store. Four years later he proved to Vogel he could open eastern markets, selling railcar loads of leather to shoemakers in cities like New York, Boston and Philadelphia. Relying on just eight "jobbers" to fill the orders, company stock tripled. Later Pfister became the company's treasurer and then its president.

Guido Pfister used the new capital to expand into other Milwaukee businesses and interests. Before his death in 1889, he consolidated banks to form the Merchants Exchange bank. Son Charles succeeded his father as bank director and invested in many local enterprises, including the city's first electric rail line, owned by local Democratic boss John Hinsey. He oversaw the bank's merger with the First National bank in 1893, and with the First Wisconsin National bank in 1919. Pfister also directed and invested in other banks, as well as railroads, toll roads, insurance companies, trust companies, heavy industries (such as Allis-Chalmers Manufacturing), land companies, plus lumber and mining interests, in and out of Wisconsin.

== The Pfister Hotel ==
In 1889 Pfister held stock in the Milwaukee Hotel company and paid a high price to buy up a majority of the shares, allowing him to fulfill his father's vision of building the greatest hotel in the city. The lavish Pfister Hotel opened in May 1893, costing over $1 million and outfitted with the latest amenities. The hotel struggled in its first year, with Pfister losing several hundred dollars a day. It wasn't until the state Republican convention in July 1894 that the hotel was filled to capacity. It became the home of many political operations and official functions, and was the preferred hotel of visiting dignitaries and celebrities. Pfister personally guided the hotel, for many years living in one of its suites. Following a paralytic stroke in 1927 Pfister sold the hotel to longtime employee Ray Smith, who Pfister had mentored since Smith was a child. The hotel houses a large collection of the Victorian art that Pfister's close friend art dealer Henry Reinhardt selected for the hotel. Reports that Pfister's ghost haunts the hotel became widespread in 2009 after several visiting major league baseball players refused to stay there after reporting suspicious occurrences.

== Managing a monopoly ==
As a director of railroad magnate Henry Villard's North American Company, Pfister acquired John Hinsey's street railway and his electricity company. By buying up all the other street lines and power companies in the city, he created the first transit and power monopoly in the country. The corporation expanded into the largest utility holding corporation in the world, controlling the utilities in many large cities such as St. Louis, Cleveland and San Francisco.

After the Panic of 1893 the overcapitalized corporation was drowning in debt, and sought to balance its books by raising electricity rates on homes and businesses, discontinuing commuter rail passes, evading taxes and violating city ordinances. A huge public outcry was followed by a call for municipally owned utilities.

Driven into receivership, the monopoly was re-organized by Pfister, F.G. Bigleow and state Republican boss Henry Clay Payne as The Milwaukee Electric Railway and Light Company (TMER&L). Refusing to lower its train fares during the depression, the company soon became the most hated institution in the city. In 1896, the company hired strikebreakers to put down a strike by the Amalgamated Street Railway Employees Union, and the next week a public boycott was launched. Over the next five years TMER&L arrogantly fought off all demands for accountability by lobbying the state legislature and bribing city aldermen. Pfister even forsaked his own party by supporting the Democrat David Stuart Rose for mayor when calls for reform from the city's progressive Republicans gained traction. Through intense lobbying of the Common Council Payne and Pfister secured legal immunity for the company by pushing through a 35-year contract with the city. The near unanimous backlash from local businessmen, church leaders and newspapers against such political manipulation resulted in widespread support for progressive reforms.

In 1905 Pfister was indicted by Milwaukee district attorney (and future governor) Francis E. McGovern in a rendering company bribery scandal, but was acquitted for lack of testimony.

== Running Wisconsin's Republican party ==
During the 1890s Pfister began to take a commanding role in the state's Republican party. After the Democratic party gained control of the state government in 1891, they brought suit against former state treasurers and their bondsmen when it was revealed that state funds had been deposited in favored banks with the earned interest unaccounted for. Pfister, U.S. Senator Philetus Sawyer and other members of the Republican "Old Guard" had been the treasurers' bondsmen, with Pfister being liable for over $100,000 in funds. The Democrats had succeeded in retrieving half the state's money, but when the Republicans came back to power in 1894 they stopped prosecuting the treasury cases. Pfister worked behind the scenes to push bills through the Republican legislature that absolved the former treasurers and their bondsmen. The bills were reluctantly signed by stalwart-backed governor William H. Upham.

Doubting Upham's re-electability in the next election, Pfister and other members of the state's machine met in a hotel room during the 1896 Republican convention in St. Louis and decided Edward Scofield would be the next Republican nominee for Wisconsin governor. After the subsequent state convention, candidate Robert M. La Follette claimed that Pfister admitted to buying away his pledged delegates and told him "If you behave yourself, we will take care of you when the proper time comes." La Follette denounced the offer.

President William McKinley's campaign manager Mark Hanna held Pfister in high regard and credited his optimism in McKinley's 1900 re-election campaign. Pfister's influence with president Theodore Roosevelt secured the office of postmaster general for his political partner Henry C. Payne, providing new opportunities to bestow federal patronage jobs on allies. He contributed to temperance groups like the Anti-Saloon League and urged the nomination of "dry" candidates.

Pfister was the acknowledged head of the state party for over twenty years, doling out political patronage to friends and failed candidates. In 1902 it was revealed that Pfister had secretly bought control of the editorial columns of some 300 of the state's newspapers. The scandal gave a boost to governor La Follette's re-election campaign and diminished Pfister's stature among the next wave of conservatives. After stalwart Republican Emanuel L. Philipp was elected Wisconsin governor in 1915 he resisted Pfister's attempts at control.

== Buying the Milwaukee Sentinel ==
In the face of the electric street railway's resistance to outside control, even the steadfast Republican Milwaukee Sentinel angrily editorialized against the monopoly by 1899. Pfister and Payne responded by suing the paper for libel. Rather than going to trial and having their business practices revealed, Pfister bought the paper outright on February 18, 1901, paying an immense sum to buy up a majority of its stock. After the death of his publisher Lansing Warren that summer, Pfister assumed publishing duties, immersing himself in the paper's operations and directing political coverage. Owning the Sentinel expanded his conservative influence from the convention backrooms to the pages of the largest daily paper in Wisconsin. The Sentinel immediately opposed the newly elected governor La Follette, and continued to denounce him as governor (and later, U.S. senator) for the next twenty years, whether it be for his progressive reforms or his stand against U. S. participation in World War I.

Pfister sold the paper to the William Randolph Hearst's newspaper syndicate June 1, 1924.

== Philanthropy ==
Pfister was a noted philanthropist, donating some of his fortune to a variety of local and state interests, from baseball franchises to conservation groups. He paid scholarships for promising young men and aided many civic, fraternal and Lutheran religious organizations. He gave freely to musical organizations, from choral groups to the Metropolitan Grand Opera. He also paid the scholarships for many talented young musicians. He also donated to art museums, charities and religious schools in Milwaukee and throughout the state, often giving large donations anonymously.

== Later life ==
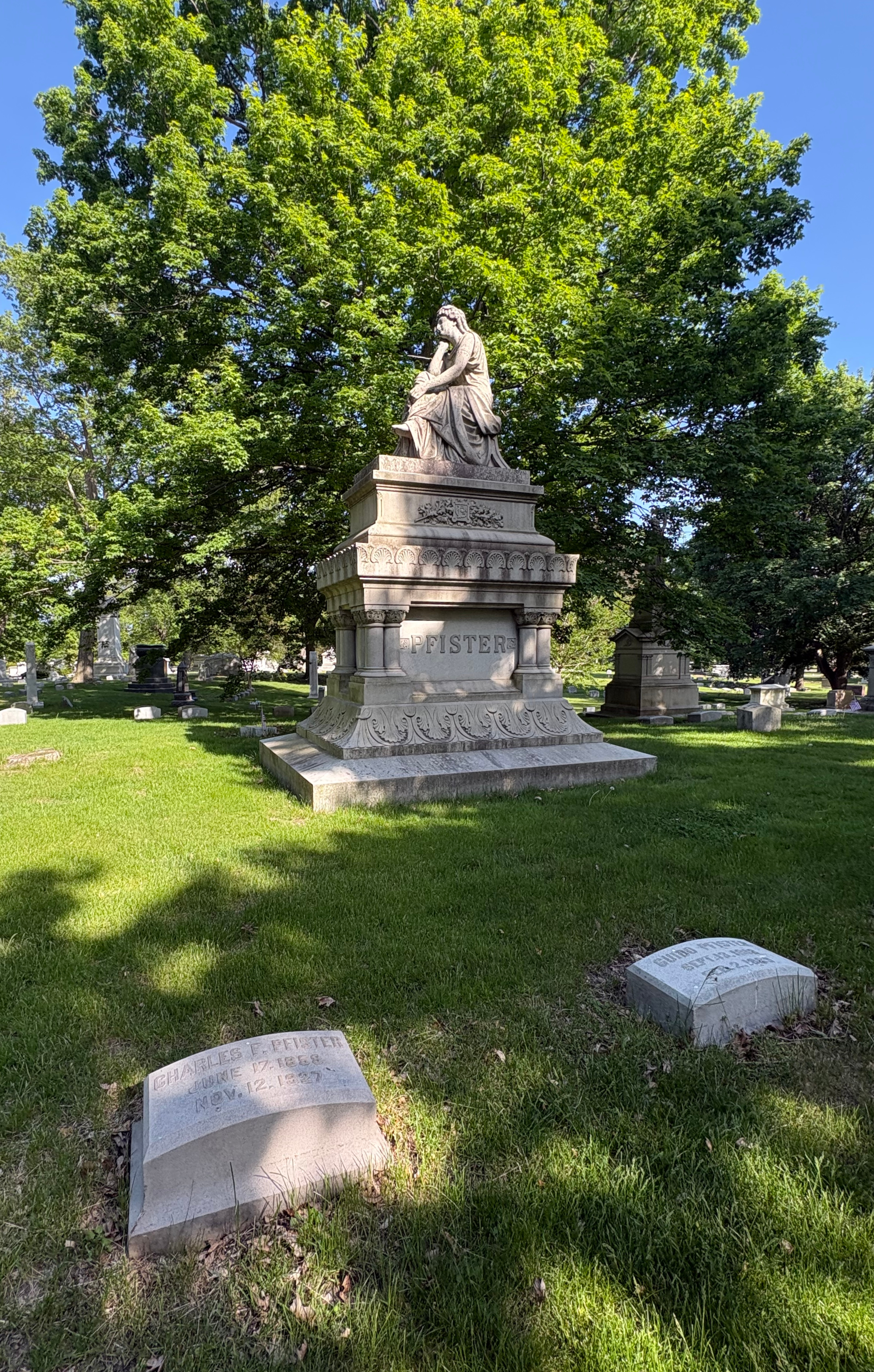
Pfister's grave at Forest Home Cemetery

In 1912 Pfister bought a 150-acre lake retreat, "Camp Rest," on Lake Five in Washington County, Wisconsin. There he kept schnauser dogs along with a small zoo of pheasants, pigeons, peacocks, turkeys and ducks. He erected a grand house there in the mission style for his guests, but preferred to sleep in a simple canvas structure on the grounds. While at Camp Rest he suffered a stroke of paralysis in April 1927, and seven months later he suffered a second stroke there. After being taken to his sister's home in Milwaukee he died of pneumonia on November 12, 1927. He was buried at Forest Home Cemetery.
