= Pfister & Vogel =

Former tannery in Wisconsin

Pfister & Vogel (P&V) was an American tannery business in Milwaukee, Wisconsin.

Frederick Vogel emigrated from Wurtemberg, Germany to Milwaukee. In 1848, he founded a tannery on Milwaukee's Menominee River. Having also emigrated from Wurtemberg in 1845, Guido Pfister opened a shoe store on nearby West Water Street. They joined forces as the Pfister & Vogel Leather Company in 1853, and their company thrived, becoming one of the largest leather producers in the country. August H. Vogel was vice-president of the company until his death.

The company changed hands several times. Its last owners, U.S. Leather Company, shut it down in 2000.

The original Pfister & Vogel campus on Water Street in Downtown Milwaukee was demolished and the site cleaned and prepared for development in 2007. Between 2008 and 2017, Milwaukee based developer Mandel Group constructed a four phase mixed-used development on the grounds. The North End consists of six apartment buildings, a Fresh Thyme grocery store and other retail tenants. The complex contains 673 apartments.

== See also ==
- Charles F. Pfister
- A.L. Gebhardt & Co.
- Vogel State Park
- Fred R. Zimmerman
- Menomonee Valley
