= Isaac Stern =

American violinist (1920–2001)

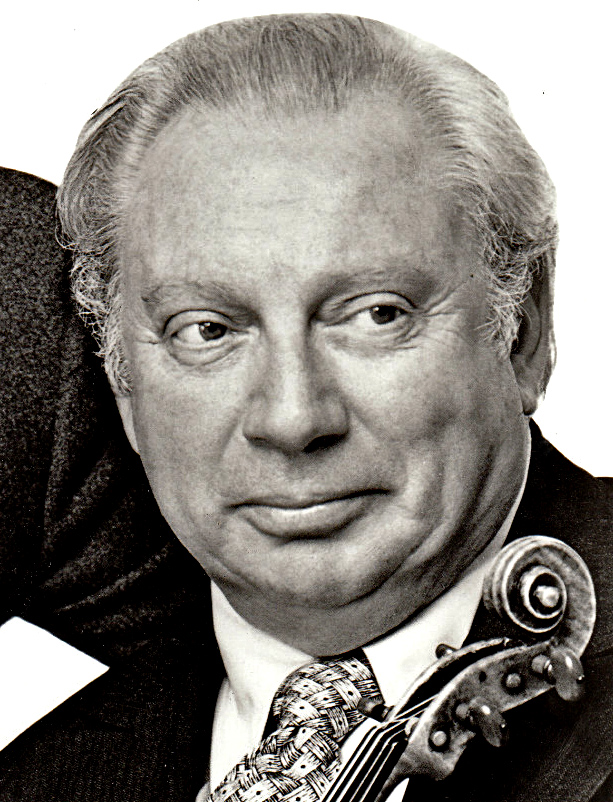
- Stern in 1980

Background information
- Born: July 21, 1920; Krzemieniec, Poland
- Died: September 22, 2001 (aged 81) New York City, US
- Genre: Classical
- Occupation: Musician
- Instrument: Violin

Isaac Stern (July 21, 1920 – September 22, 2001) was an American violinist.

Born in Poland, Stern moved to the United States when he was 14 months old. Stern performed both nationally and internationally, notably touring the Soviet Union and China, and performing extensively in Israel, a country to which he had close ties since shortly after its founding.

Stern received extensive recognition for his work, including winning the Presidential Medal of Freedom and six Grammy Awards, and being named to the French Legion of Honour. The Isaac Stern Auditorium at Carnegie Hall bears his name, due to his role in saving the venue from demolition in the 1960s.

== Biography ==
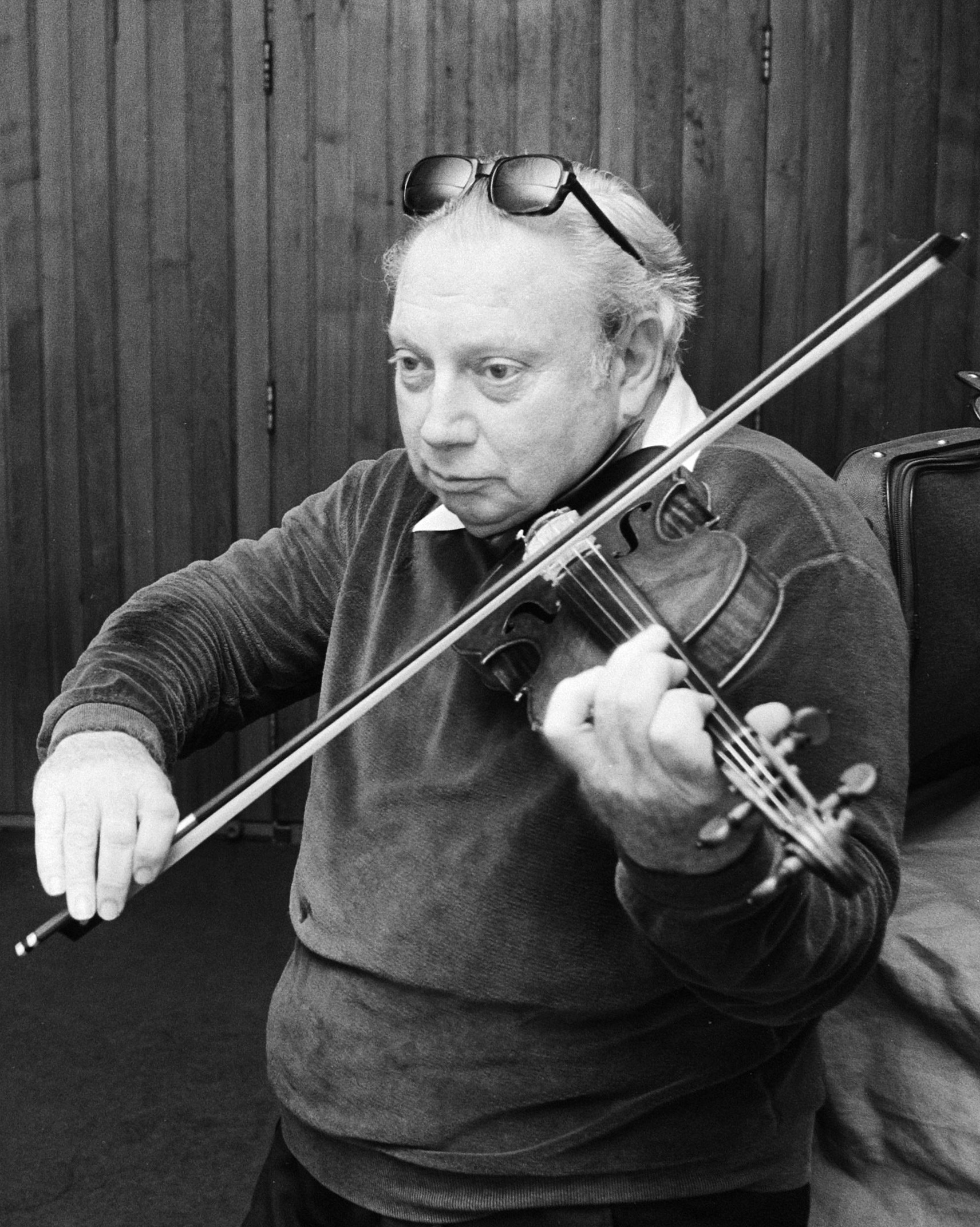
Isaac Stern in 1975

Isaac Stern was born in Krzemieniec, Poland (present-day Ukraine), to a Jewish family. He was the son of Solomon and Clara Stern. When he was 14 months old, his family moved to San Francisco in 1921. Both his parents were musical and his mother, who had studied at the Saint Petersburg Conservatory, began teaching him the piano when he was six years old. She later switched his lessons to the violin when he turned eight. In 1928, Stern's parents enrolled him at the San Francisco Conservatory of Music, where he studied until 1931. He then briefly studied in New York City with Louis Persinger before returning to the San Francisco Conservatory. There, he studied for five years with Naoum Blinder, the concertmaster of the San Francisco Symphony, whom he credited as his most significant mentor. At his public début on February 18, 1936, aged 15, he played Saint-Saëns' Violin Concerto No. 3 in B minor with the San Francisco Symphony under the direction of Pierre Monteux. Reflecting on his background, Stern once memorably quipped that cultural exchanges between the U.S. and Soviet Russia drew from the same city:

They send us their Jews from Odessa, and we send them our Jews from Odessa."

During World War II, Stern was rejected from military service due to flat feet. He then joined the United Service Organizations and performed for US troops. During one such performance on Guadalcanal, a Japanese soldier, mesmerized by his playing, sneaked into the audience of US personnel listening to his performance before sneaking back out.

Stern toured the Soviet Union in 1951, the first American violinist to do so. In 1967, Stern stated his refusal to return to the USSR until the Soviet regime allowed artists to enter and leave the country freely. His only visit to Germany was in 1999, for a series of master classes, but he never performed publicly in Germany.

Stern was married three times. His first marriage, in 1948 to ballerina Nora Kaye, ended in divorce after 18 months, but the two of them remained friends. On August 17, 1951, he married Vera Lindenblit. They had three children together, including conductors Michael and David Stern and also Rabbi Shira Stern, one of the first female rabbis in the US. Their marriage ended in divorce in 1994 after 43 years. In 1996, Stern married his third wife, Linda Reynolds.

Stern died September 22, 2001, of heart failure in a hospital in Manhattan, New York City, after an extended stay.

== Music career ==
In 1940, Stern began performing with Russian-born pianist Alexander Zakin, collaborating until 1977. Within musical circles, Stern became renowned both for his recordings and for championing certain younger players. Among his discoveries were cellists Yo-Yo Ma and Jian Wang, and violinists Itzhak Perlman and Pinchas Zukerman.

In the 1960s, he played a major role in saving New York City's Carnegie Hall from demolition, by organizing the Citizens' Committee to Save Carnegie Hall. Following the purchase of Carnegie Hall by New York City, the Carnegie Hall Corporation was formed, and Stern was chosen as its first president, a title he held until his death. Carnegie Hall later named its main auditorium in his honor.

Among Stern's many recordings are concertos by Brahms, Bach, Beethoven, Mendelssohn, Sibelius, Tchaikovsky, and Vivaldi and modern works by Barber, Bartók, Stravinsky, Bernstein, Rochberg, Berg, Penderecki, and Dutilleux. The Dutilleux concerto, entitled L'arbre des songes ["The Tree of Dreams"] was a 1985 commission by Stern himself. He also dubbed actors' violin-playing in several films, such as the 1971 film adaptation of Fiddler on the Roof.

Stern served as musical advisor for the 1946 film Humoresque, about a rising violin star and his patron, played respectively by John Garfield and Joan Crawford. He was also the featured violin soloist on the soundtrack for the film adaptation of Fiddler on the Roof. In 1999, he appeared in the film Music of the Heart, along with Itzhak Perlman and several other famed violinists, with a youth orchestra led by Meryl Streep (the film was based on the true story of Roberta Guaspari, a gifted violin teacher in Harlem who eventually took her musicians to play a concert in Carnegie Hall).

External videos
- Interview with Stern on My First 79 Years, 26 October 1999, C-SPAN
- Booknotes interview with Stern on My First 79 Years, 23 January 2000, C-SPAN

In his autobiography, co-authored with Chaim Potok, My First 79 Years, Stern cited Nathan Milstein and Arthur Grumiaux as major influences on his style of playing.

The violinist Alexander Schneider was instrumental in establishing the Casals Festival in Prades, France in honor of the cellist Pablo Casals and he invited Stern to perform at the first festival in 1950. Renowned musicians from all over the world performed at the festival and Stern continued to participate for a number of years, including after the festival moved to Puerto Rico.

Stern was one of the first American artists to perform in the Soviet Union after World War II and the tour was in part facilitated by his relationship with the violinist, David Oistrakh. He played in Moscow in May 1956 and in other major cities as well, including Leningrad and Kiev.

He won Grammys for his work with Eugene Istomin and Leonard Rose in their famous chamber music trio in the 1960s and '70s, while also continuing his duo work with Alexander Zakin during this time. Stern recorded a series of piano quartets in the 1980s and 1990s with Emanuel Ax, Jaime Laredo and Yo-Yo Ma, including those of Mozart, Beethoven, Schumann and Fauré, winning another Grammy in 1992 for the Brahms quartets Op. 25 and 26.

In 1979, seven years after Richard Nixon made the first official visit by a US president to the country, the People's Republic of China offered Stern and pianist David Golub an unprecedented invitation to tour the country. While there, he collaborated with the Central Philharmonic Orchestra of China (now China National Symphony Orchestra) under the direction of conductor Li Delun. He also played recitals in Beijing and Shanghai and taught master classes in both cities. Their visit was filmed and resulted in the Oscar-winning documentary, From Mao to Mozart: Isaac Stern in China.

== Ties to Israel ==
Stern maintained close ties with Israel. Stern began performing in the country in 1949. In 1973, he performed for wounded Israeli soldiers during the Yom Kippur War. During the 1991 Gulf War and Iraq's Scud missile attacks on Israel, he had been playing in the Jerusalem Theater. During his performance, an air raid siren sounded, causing the audience to panic. Stern then stepped onto the stage and began playing a movement of Bach. The audience then calmed down, donned gas masks, and sat throughout the rest of his performance. Stern was a supporter of several educational projects in Israel, among them the America-Israel Foundation and the Jerusalem Music Center.The Jerusalem Music Center was established in 1973 and was inspired by Stern's interest in nurturing young musicians in Israel. He attended the opening ceremonies along with Alexander Schneider and Pablo Casals and spent weeks afterward playing with young musicians.

=== Instruments ===
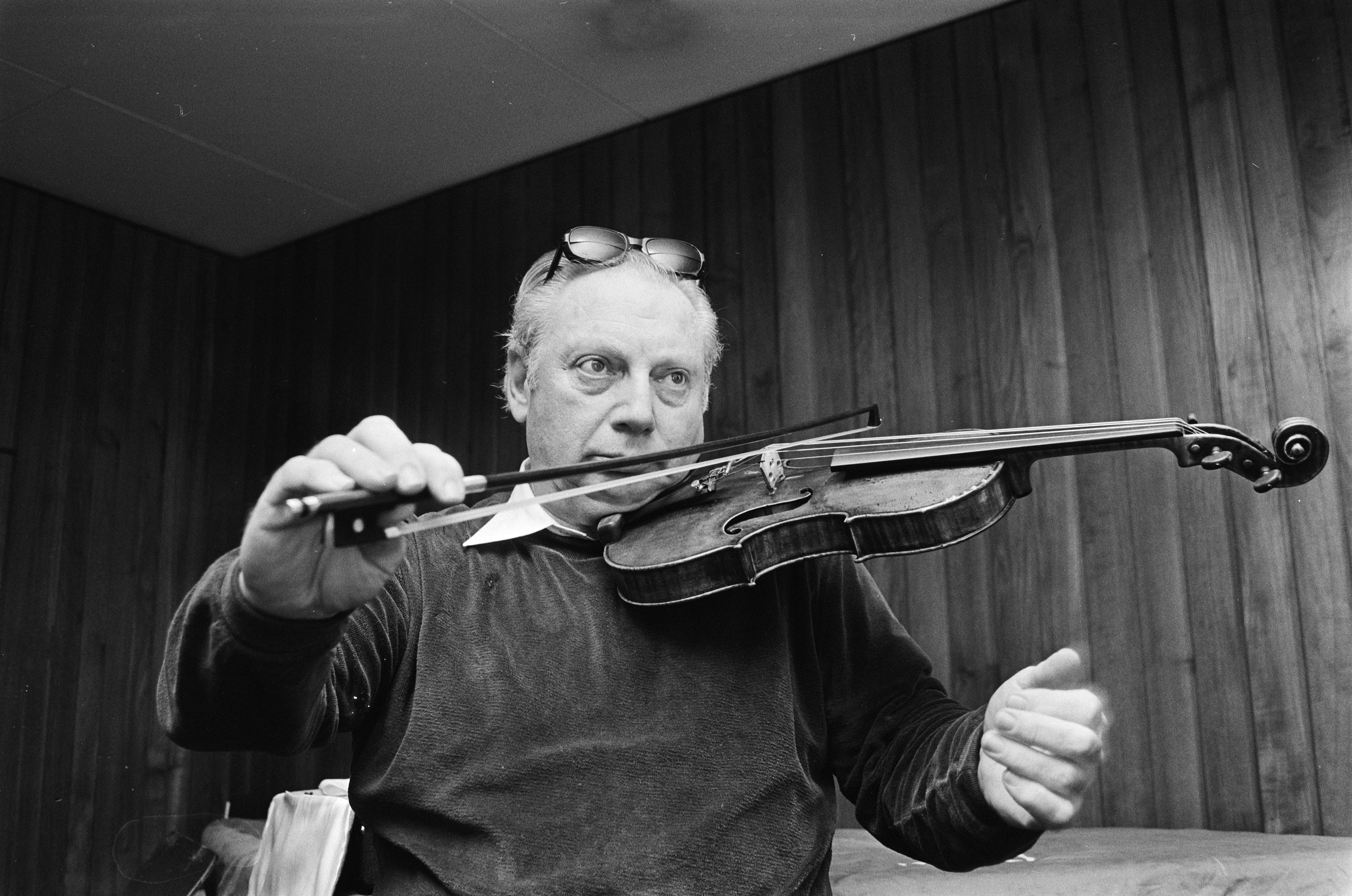
Isaac Stern playing with one hand in 1979

Stern's favorite instrument was the Ysaÿe Guarnerius, one of the violins produced by the Cremonese luthier Giuseppe Guarneri del Gesù. It had previously been played by the violin virtuoso and composer Eugène Ysaÿe.

Among other instruments, Stern played the "Kruse-Vormbaum" Stradivarius (1728), the "ex-Stern" Bergonzi (1733), the "Panette" Guarneri del Gesù (1737), a Michele Angelo Bergonzi (1739–1757), the "Arma Senkrah" Guadagnini (1750), a Giovanni Guadagnini (1754), a J. B. Vuillaume copy of the "Panette" Guarneri del Gesu of 1737 (c.1850), and the "ex-Nicolas I" J.B. Vuillaume (1840). He also owned two contemporary instruments by Samuel Zygmuntowicz and modern Italian Jago Peternella Violins.

In May 2003, Stern's collection of instruments, bows and musical ephemera was sold through Tarisio Auctions. The auction set a number of world records and was at the time the second highest grossing violin auction of all time, with total sales of over $3.3M.

== Awards and commemoration ==
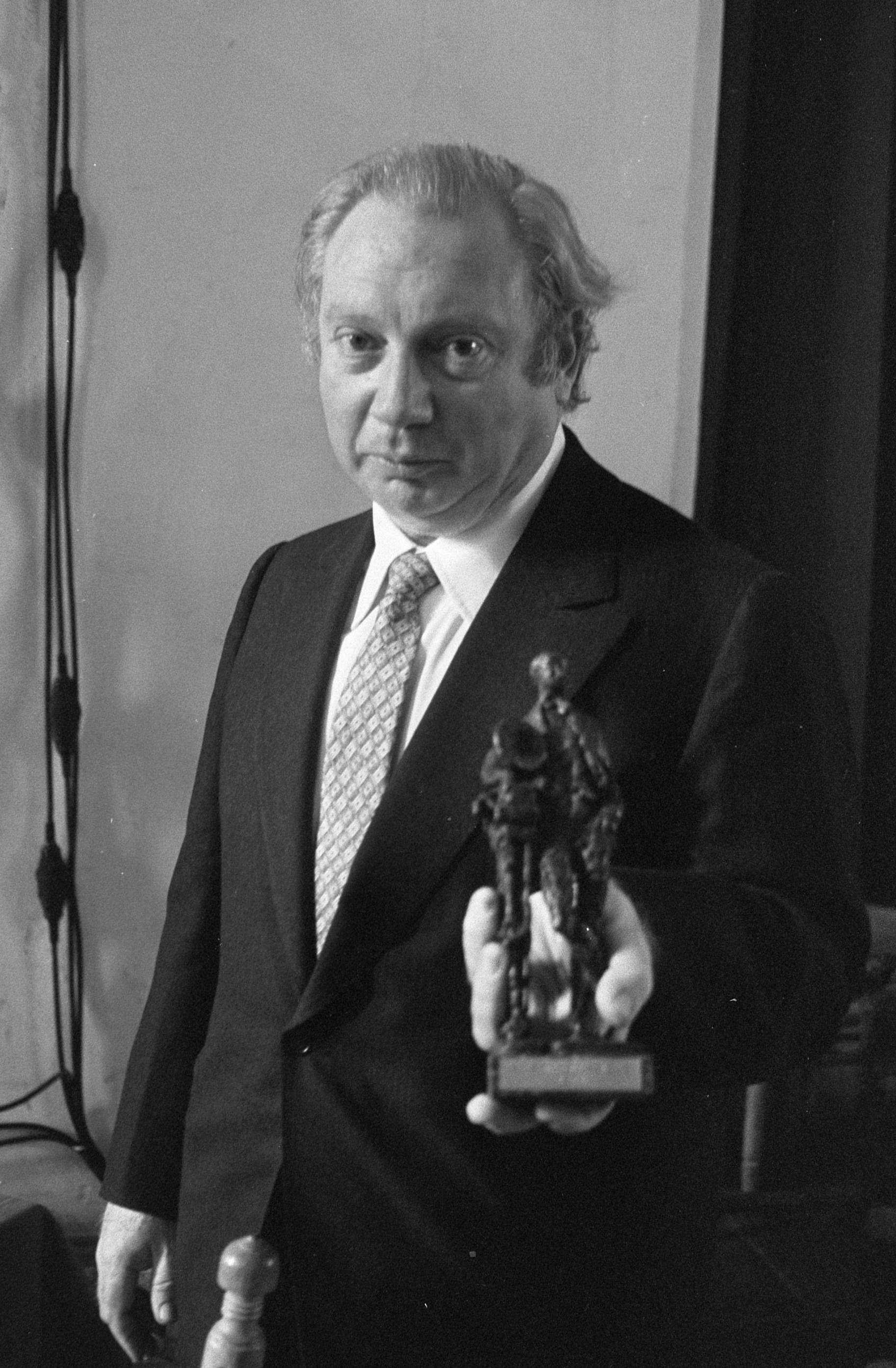
Isaac Stern with the Edison in 1971

- Sonning Award (1982; Denmark)
- Wolf Prize
- Kennedy Center Honors (1984)
- Grammy Award for Best Instrumental Soloist(s) Performance (with orchestra) (1962, 1963, 1965, 1982)
- Grammy Award for Best Chamber Music Performance (1971, 1992)
- National Medal of Arts (1991)
- Presidential Medal of Freedom (1992)
- Elected to the American Philosophical Society (1995)
- Polar Music Prize (2000; Sweden)
- Commandeur de la Légion d'honneur (1990)
- Gold Medal of the Royal Philharmonic Society (1991)
- Carnegie Hall Midtown Manhattan, New York: main auditorium was named for Isaac Stern in 1997.

In 2012, a street in Tel Aviv was named for Stern.

== Discography ==
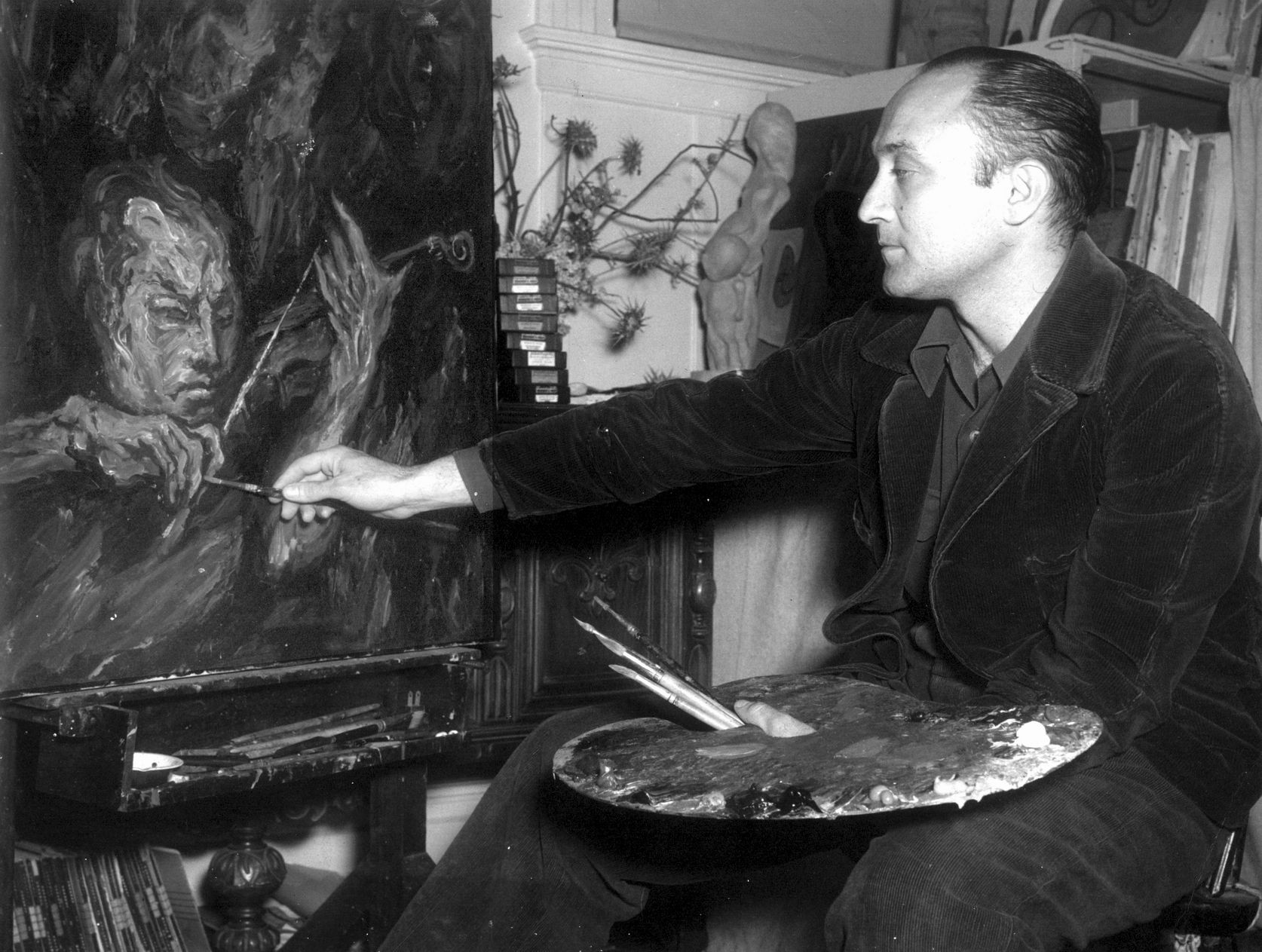
Bezalel Schatz painting a portrait of Isaac Stern

- 1944

Brahms: String Sextet No. 1 (with Alexander Schneider, Milton Katims, Milton Thomas, Pablo Casals and Madeleine Foley)

- 1944

Brahms: Trio for Piano, Violin and Cello No. 1 in B Major, op. 8 (with Myra Hess and Pablo Casals)

- 1946

Violin selections from the movie Humoresque (1946 film) with Oscar Levant on the piano, Columbia Masterworks Records set MM-657

- 1951

Brahms: Violin Concerto in D Major (with Sir Thomas Beecham and the Royal Philharmonic Orchestra), Columbia Records

- 1952

Bach: Partita in E Minor & G Minor for Violin and Piano, Sonata No.3 in E Major for Violin and Piano (with Alexander Zakin)

- 1953

Prokofiev: Violin Sonatas (with Alexander Zakin)

- 1955 Lalo: Symphonie Espagnole, Bruch G Minor Concerto, (with Philadelphia Orchestra; conductor: Eugene Ormandy)
- 1957

Wieniawski: Violin Concerto No. 2 in D Minor, op. 22 (with Philadelphia Orchestra; conductor: Eugene Ormandy)

- 1958

Tchaikovsky: Violin Concerto in D Major op. 35 (with Philadelphia Orchestra; conductor: Eugene Ormandy)
Mendelssohn: Violin Concerto in e minor op. 64 (with Philadelphia Orchestra; conductor: Eugene Ormandy)

- 1959

Saint-Saens: Introduction & Rondo Capriccioso op. 28 (with Philadelphia Orchestra; conductor: Eugene Ormandy)
Beethoven Violin Concerto in D, Op. 61 (with New York Philharmonic; conductor: Leonard Bernstein) Fontana 699 049 CL CFL 1051.

- 1964

Hindemith: Violin Concerto (1939) (with New York Philharmonic; conductor: Leonard Bernstein)

- 1978

Penderecki: Violin Concerto No. 1 (1976)(with Minnesota Orchestra; conductor: Stanislaw Skrowaczewski)

- 1983

Bach, Vivaldi: Concertos for 2 Violins
Isaac Stern: 60th Anniversary Celebration
Mendelssohn: Violin Concerto; Beethoven: Romances in G & F Major
Haydn: London Trios

- 1984

Barber Violin Concerto

- 1985

An Isaac Stern Vivaldi Gala

- 1986

Tchaikovsky, Mendelssohn: Violin Concertos

- 1987

Dutilleux: L'Arbre des Songes (Concerto pour Violin et Orchestre)
Maxwell Davies: Concerto for Violin and Orchestra
Celebration
Bach: Double Concerto; Violin Concertos Nos.1 & 2
Beethoven: Violin Concerto
Mozart: The Flute Quartets
Bach: Concertos for Violin, BWV 1041–43 & 1060

- 1988

Shostakovich: Piano Trio No.2; Cello Sonata
Brahms: Concerto for Violin, Cello and Orchestra in A Minor, Op. 102 & Piano Quartet No. 3 in C Minor, Op. 60
Prokofiev: Violin Concertos No. 1 & 2
Brahms: Violin Concerto

- 1989

The Japanese Album
Music, My Love
Prokofiev: Concertos No. 1 & 2 for Violin and Orchestra
Mozart: Violin Concertos Nos.4 & 5

- 1990

Brahms, Mendelssohn, Schubert: Trios
Brahms: The Piano Quartets
Rameau: Pieces de clavecin en concerts
Lalo, Bruch, Wenianski, others: Violin Concertos
Bach, Mozart, Brahms, others: Violin Concertos
Mozart, Telemann, J.C. Bach, Reicha: Trios, Quartets
Schubert: Violin Sonatas
Humoresque: Favorite Violin Encores

- 1991

Beethoven: Piano Concerto No.5 "Emperor"; Triple Concerto
Beethoven: Complete Trios
Concert of the Century: Celebrating the 85th Anniversary of Carnegie Hall
Dvorák: Cello Concerto; Violin Concerto
Webern: Complete Works, Op. 1 – Op. 31

- 1992

Brahms: Sextets; more
Beethoven & Schumann Piano Quartets (with Emanuel Ax, Jaime Loredo, & Yo-Yo Ma)

- 1993

Tchaikovsky: Concerto for Violin and Orchestra & Serenade for Strings
Fauré: Piano Quartets

- 1994

Greatest Hits: Violin
The House of Magical Sounds
Greatest Hits: Schubert
Greatest Hits: Brahms
Beethoven, Schumann: Piano Quartets
Mozart: Sonatas for Violin and Piano, K. 454, 296 & 526
Beethoven: Piano Trios "Ghost" & "Archduke"
Bach: Violin Concerto, BWV 1041; Piano Concerto, BWV 1056; Brandenburg Concerto No.5; more
Mozart: Sinfonia Concertante; Violin Concerto No.5
Brahms: Sextet in B-flat major, Op. 18 & Piano Trio No. 1 in B major, Op. 8
Schubert: Quintet in C major, D956 & Symphony No. 5 in B-flat major, D485

- 1995

Isaac Stern Presents Encores with Orchestra
Telemann, Bach Family: Trio Sonatas
Mendelssohn: Piano Trios 1 & 2
Brahms: Piano Trios, Piano Quartets
A Life in Music, Vol.3: Bach, Beethoven, Brahms, Mozart, more
Beethoven: Piano Trios "Ghost" & "Archduke"; Variations
Schubert, Haydn: Piano Trios; Mozart: Piano Quartet
Bartók: Violin Concertos
Bernstein/Dutilleux: Violin Concertos
Berg: Violin Concerto; Kammerkonzert
Prokofiev/Bartók: Violin Concertos; Rhapsody No.1
Stravinsky/Rochberg: Violin Concertos
Barber/Maxwell Davies: Violin Concertos
Hindemith/Penderecki: Violin Concertos
Berg: Piano Sonata; Krenek: Piano Sonata No.3; Webern: Piano Variations; Debussy, Ravel: works
A Life in Music, Vol.1: Beethoven, Brahms, Mendelssohn, Sibelius, more
Mozart: Haffner Serenade
Mozart: Sonatas for Violin and Piano, Vol. II
Beethoven, Brahms: Violin Concertos
Tchaikovsky/Sibelius: Violin Concertos
Bach: Violin Concertos; Double Concerto; more
Vivaldi: The Four Seasons; Concertos
Mozart: Violin Concertos Nos.1–5; Sinfonia concertante; more
Wieniawski/Bruch/Tchaikovsky: Violin Concertos
Mendelssohn/Dvorák: Violin Concertos
Saint-Saëns: Violin concerto n°3, Lalo: Symphonie Espagnole, Chausson: Poème, Fauré: Berceuse, Ravel: Tzigane

- 1996

More Mozart's Greatest Hits
Mozart: Violin Sonatas, Vol. III
Schubert and Boccherini String Quintets
A Life in Music, Vol.4: Bach, Bartók, Beethoven, Copland, Schubert, more
Prokofiev: Violin Sonatas
Bartók: Violin Sonatas; Webern: Four Pieces for Violin and Piano
Beethoven: Violin Sonatas
J.S. & C.P.E. Bach, Handel, Tartini: Violin Sonatas
Hindemith/Bloch/Copland: Violin Sonatas
Schubert: Sonatinas Nos.1–3; Rondeau Brillant; Grand Duo Sonata
Franck/Debussy/Enesco: Violin Sonatas
Brahms: Violin Sonatas No. 1-3
Isaac Stern Presents Encores with Violin & Piano

- 1997

Barber: Adagio for Strings / Schuman – In Praise of Shahn etc.
Bartók Sonatas for Violin and Piano
Mozart: The Piano Quartets

- 1998

Isaac Stern Plays Mozart, Beethoven, Haydn
Beethoven: Violin Concerto in D
Bernstein: The Age of Anxiety; Foss: Serenade
Bach, Vivaldi: Concertos
Caprice Viennois: Music of Kreisler

- 1999

My First 79 Years
Tchaikovsky, Mendelssohn: Violin Concertos

- 2000

Dvorák: Piano Quartet No.2, Sonatina in G, Romantic Pieces
Vivaldi: The Four Seasons; Concertos for Two Violins
