= Alexander Zakin =

Russian pianist (1903–1990)

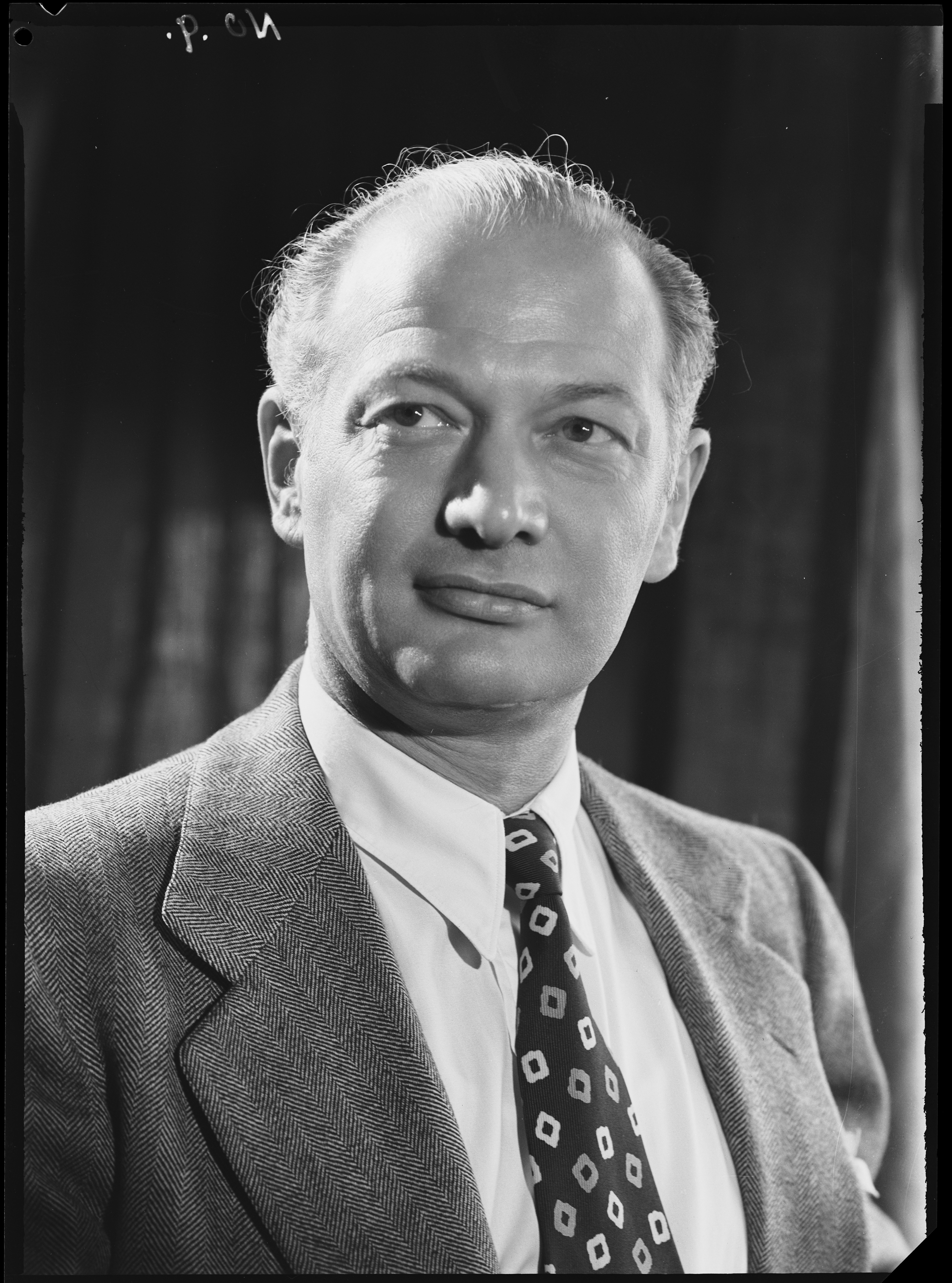
- Zakin in 1947
- Born: 22 January 1903; Tobolsk, Russia
- Died: 16 October 1990 (aged 87); New York City, U.S.
- Occupation: Pianist

Alexander Zakin (22 January 1903 – 16 October 1990) was a Russian pianist, best known for being the accompanist of the violinist Isaac Stern between 1940 and 1977. They appeared together in many of the world's most prestigious concert halls and made many recordings together.

== Early years ==
Zakin was born to a violinist father in Tobolsk, Tobolsk Governorate and began studying at the Saint Petersburg Conservatory from the age of 8. He was a pupil of Aleksander Michałowski from 1911 to 1914, and then studied under Leonid Nikolayev. He emigrated in 1921 and studied music in Berlin, making his solo debut as a performer there in 1926.

== Career ==
In February 1926, a piano quartet debuted, alternately named Klavier Kiddies, Jass auf vier Flügeln, and ERKLA (Erstes Klavier-Quartett), which included Zakin, Adam Gelbtrunk, Lewitsch (replaced by J. Pomerane, and later by Rio Gebhardt) and Leopold Mittmann. They performed for a few years on the radio and in concert, while also making gramophone recordings. In the late 1920s and early 1930s, he was a performer in parts of Central Europe, giving recitals and supporting chamber-music ensembles. After Adolf Hitler came to power in 1933, he fled to Luxembourg and became a piano teacher to the royal family and was employed by the Radio Luxembourg. In 1940, he began performing with violinist Isaac Stern, a partnership which would last 37 years until 1977. He also performed with violinists Paul Godwin, David and Igor Oistrakh, Leonid Kogan and cellist Gregor Piatigorsky in an illustrious career which saw him in frequent contact with impresario Sol Hurok. Zakin played the piano at the White House on several occasions during the terms of Presidents Dwight D. Eisenhower, John F. Kennedy and Lyndon B. Johnson.

Over the years he performed works by composers such as Johann Sebastian Bach, Ludwig van Beethoven, Béla Bartók, Ernest Bloch, Johannes Brahms, Claude Debussy, George Frideric Handel, Joseph Haydn, Paul Hindemith, Darius Milhaud, Sergei Prokofiev, Robert Schumann, Grigoraș Dinicu, George Enescu, César Franck, Fritz Kreisler, Ottokar Nováček, Gaetano Pugnani, Pablo de Sarasate and Pyotr Ilyich Tchaikovsky. His performances of the sonatas of Brahms with Stern received considerable acclaim, amongst other performances they did together. He died on October 16, 1990, at the St. Luke's-Roosevelt Hospital Center in New York City of heart failure, aged 87.
