= August H. Vogel =

American businessman

- Born: August Hugo Vogel; December 16, 1862; Milwaukee, Wisconsin, US
- Died: February 18, 1930 (aged 67); Milwaukee, Wisconsin, US
- Burial place: Forest Home Cemetery
- Education: Harvard University
- Occupations: Vice president and general manager
- Employer: Pfister & Vogel
- Known for: establishing Vogel State Park

August Hugo Vogel (December 16, 1862 – February 18, 1930) was an American businessman. He was vice-president and the general manager of Pfister & Vogel leather tannery of Milwaukee, Wisconsin. He donated the land that is now Vogel State Park in Blairsville, Georgia.

== Early life ==
Vogel was born on December 16, 1862, in Milwaukee, Wisconsin. His parents were Auguste and Frederic Vogel Sr., co-founder of the Pfister & Vogel Leather Company of Milwaukee, Wisconsin. His parents imigrated to the United States from Germany in 1846.

Vogel attended the Milwaukee University School and Milwaukee High School until 1878. He attended the Adams Academy from 1879 to 1881. He graduated with a B.A. from Harvard University in 1886. While at Harvard, he was a member of Delta Kappa Epsilon (aka The Dickey Club).

== Career ==
After college, Vogel returned to Milwaukee and worked for the Merchants Exchange Bank. In 1888, he started working his father's business, Pfister & Vogel, which was one of the largest businesses in Milwaukee. Vogel was the secretary and general manager of Pfister & Vogel from 1893 to 1907, and its vice president from 1907 until he died in 1930. Prior to World War I, it was the largest tannery in the world. The Vogel family harvested bark from oak and hemlock trees located on thousands of acres they owned in North Georgia. The bark was shipped to Wisconsin and used by the company for tanning leather.

Vogel was also president of the Western Leathern Company of Milwaukee and a director of the Eagle-Ottawa Leather Company of Chicago and Grand Haven, Michigan. In 1927, he was elected to the executive council of the Tanners' Council Laboratory Foundation. He frequently represented the tannery industry at a national level, including speaking before congressional committees in Washington, D.C. regarding tariffs.

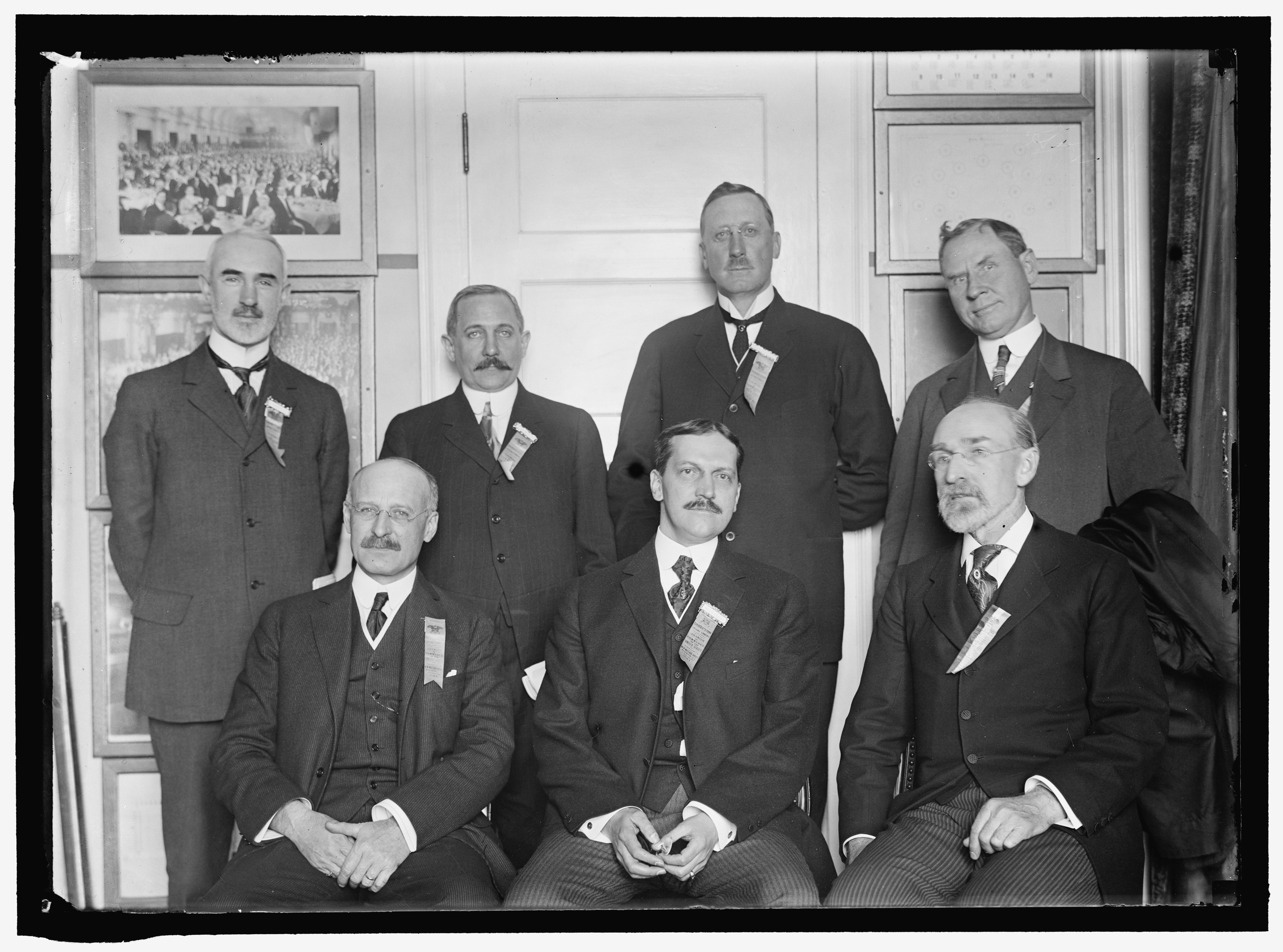
Chamber of Commerce Directors Rear: John H. Fayey; W. M. McCormick; R. Goodwyn Rhett; T. L. L. Temple. Front: August H. Vogel; Harry A. Wheeler, President; at right rear is Charles R. Van Hise, president of the University of Wisconsin

Vogel was vice-president of the Johnson Service Company, vice president of the Hamilton-Standard Propellor Co., and president of the Savings and Investment Association, all of Milwaukee. He was a director the Federal Reserve Bank of Chicago from 1914 to 1930, and the Milwaukee Association of Commerce.

Vogel was one of the "industrial leaders of the nation" and attended conferences that led to the creation of the United States Chamber of Commerce. He became a director of the Chamber of Commerce of the United States in 1913. During World War I, he was a regional adviser of the war industries board, vice chairman of Milwaukee County Council of Defense, and chairman of Liberty Loan campaigns.

== Personal life ==
Vogel married Anita Hanson in February 1892 in Milwaukee. They had six children: August H. Vogel Jr., Hugo C. Vogel, Theodore F. Vogel, Rudloph E. Vogel, Anita Vogel, and Elizabeth A. Vogel. Their Chenequa, Wisconsin summer residence was designed by Alexander C. Eschweiler.

Vogel was president of the Milwaukee University School and vice president of Milwaukee-Downer College. He was president of the Martha Washington Home and the St. Johns Home for the Aged. He was chairman of the Milwaukee Community Fund for eight years and served on the board of trustees of the National Association of Community Chests. He was president of the Voters League from 1906 to 1908.

Vogel was a charter member and first president of the University Club of Milwaukee. He also belonged to Chenequa Country Club, the Harvard Club of Milwaukee, the Milwaukee Club, Pine Lake Yacht Club, and the Wisconsin Club. He was a member of St. James Episcopal Church and served as a senior warden.

Vogle died on February 18, 1930, at his home in Milwaukee from a heart attack. He was buried in the Forest Home Cemetery.

== Legacy ==
Vogel State Park of Blairsville, Georgia consists of land donated by August H. Vogel and his brother Fred Vogel Jr. for state park in 1927. Because synthetic method to tan leather was developed during World War I, Vogle brothers no longer needed their forestry resources in Georgia.
