= University Club of Milwaukee =

Coordinates: 43°02′30.9″N 87°53′59.1″W

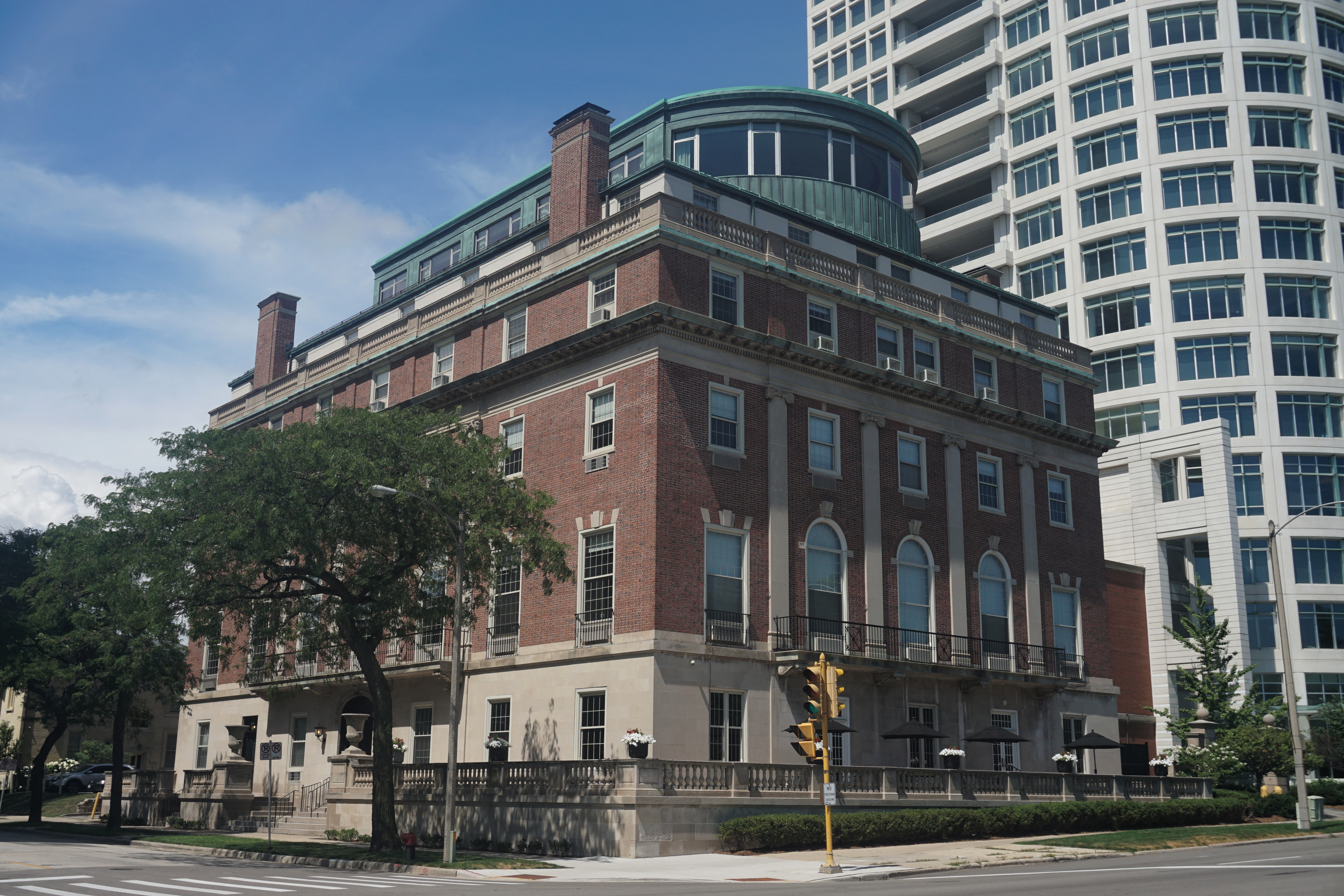
University Club of Milwaukee

The University Club of Milwaukee is a private club in Milwaukee, Wisconsin, located at 924 E. Wells Street. The club, which was founded by a group of nineteen college alumni, received its charter November 7, 1898. Its first president was August H. Vogel.

== History ==
The club first met in a modest residence at 508 Jackson Street, near what is now a surface parking lot at Clybourn and Jackson Streets. In 1928, the club moved into its current clubhouse, newly designed by John Russell Pope, at the corner of Wells and Prospect Streets overlooking Lake Michigan. The 924 E. Wells St. permanently closed in December 2023.

== University Club Tower ==
In 2007, construction of a namesake luxury condominium tower was completed on a site immediately north of the club. The 36-floor, 446-feet tall University Club Tower is now the tallest residential building and fourth tallest building in Milwaukee and the state of Wisconsin. The tower houses a health club facility for residents that doubles as the University Club's own member health club.

== See also ==
- List of American gentlemen's clubs
