= Gephardt =

Gephardt is a surname. Notable people with the surname include:

- Dick Gephardt (born 1941), American politician
- Chrissy Gephardt, American LGBT rights activist and former social worker, daughter of Dick Gephardt

== See also ==
- Gebhardt
