= Milwaukee Club =

Private club in Milwaukee, Wisconsin

Coordinates: 43°02′21″N 87°54′18″W

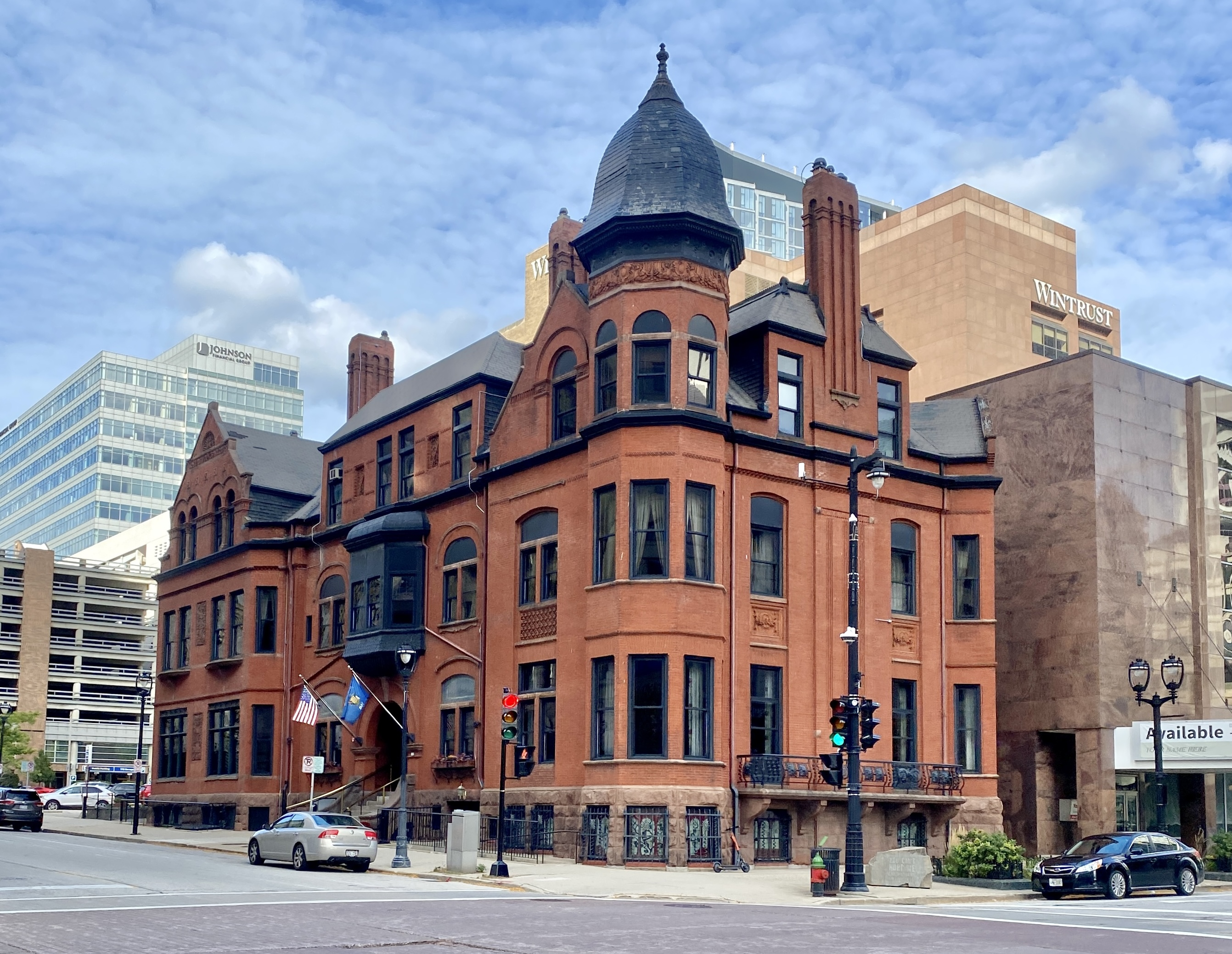
- The clubhouse seen in 2023
- Formation: January 1882
- Headquarters: Milwaukee, Wisconsin
- President: Ken Dortzbach
- Website: https://milwaukeeclub.com/

The Milwaukee Club is a private social club in Milwaukee, Wisconsin. Its current address is 706 N. Jefferson Street. It has EIN 39-0475860 under the status 501(c)(7) Social and Recreation Clubs; in 2024 it reported total revenue of $843,255 and total assets of $1,341,742.

== Clubhouse ==
The Queen Anne-style building that currently houses the Milwaukee Club was constructed in 1884 and was designed by architect Daniel Burnham. The estimated cost for the project was $60,000. In 1893, architect Walter A. Holbrook was commissioned by the club to extend the building 18 ft (5.5 m) north. During this process, the north wall of the building was demolished, and the roofline was reconfigured. The building is also known for a distinctive corner turret that juts out from the rest of the clubhouse.

The Milwaukee Club building has numerous dining rooms for members, including a main dining room, as well as 10 private dining rooms that can accommodate between two and 60 guests at a time. In 1910, Lydia Van Dyke Payne donated her late husband Henry's book collection to the club, and an estimated 2,000 volumes were gifted to the club's library, today known as the Henry C. Payne Library.

== History ==
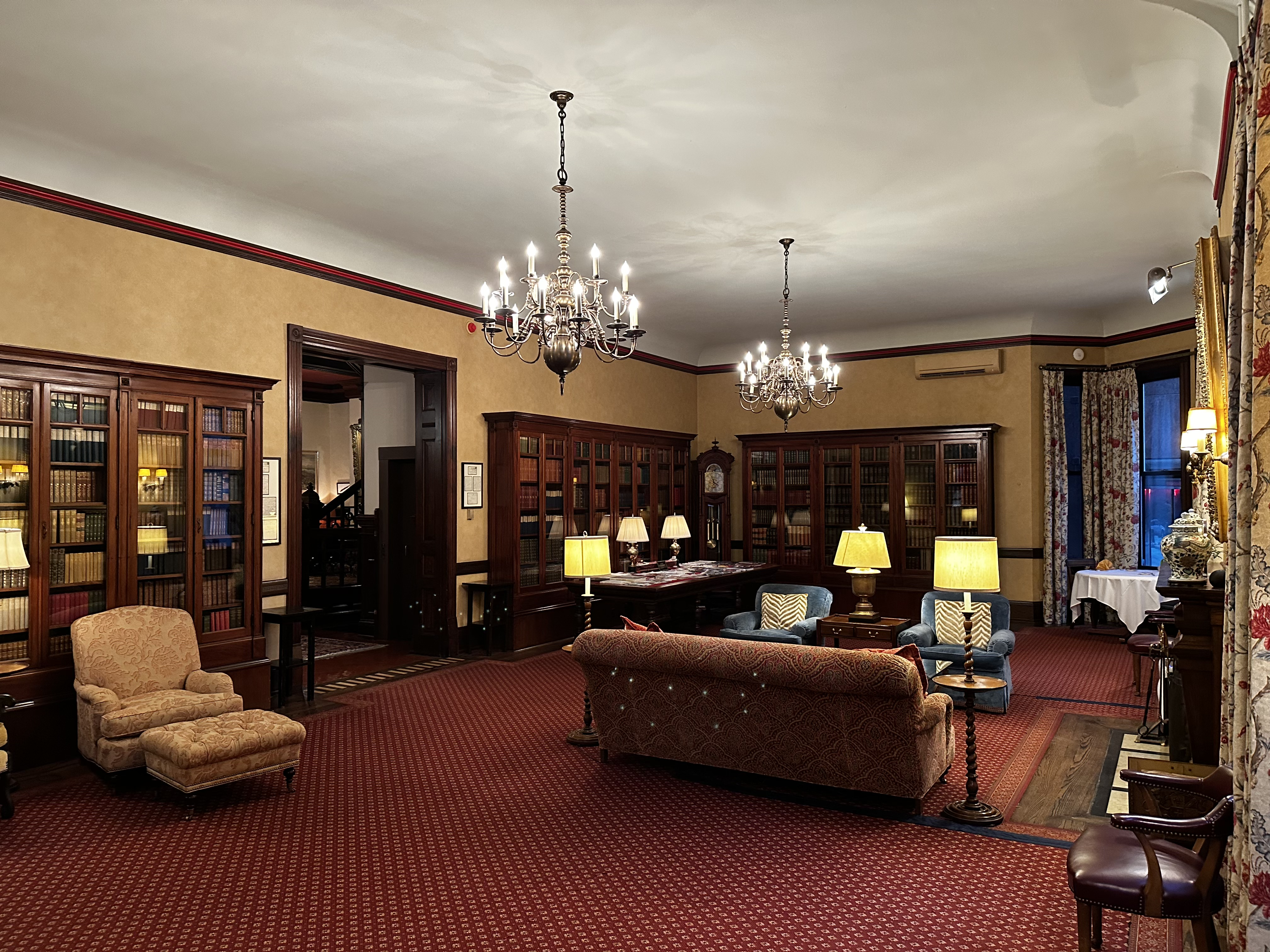
The Henry C. Payne Library at the Milwaukee Club

=== Early history ===
The Milwaukee Club was founded in 1882 by a group of local businessmen. A document containing all the 112 original members signatures remains in the building today. The club originally utilized the Newhall House Hotel as its gathering place, however, the building burned down in a fire less than a year later. The club's first president, Alexander Mitchell, was a prominent Wisconsin politician at the time.

=== 21st century ===
In 2000, the club converted a basement storage room into a casual bar area for members, named “The Rathskeller”.

== Membership ==
Membership in the Milwaukee Club is by invitation only. The 2024, the organization had around 200 members. Several notable members of the club include:

- Alexander Mitchell, Wisconsin politician
- Robert Baird, businessman
- Frederick Vogel, Wisconsin politician and businessman
- John Plankinton, businessman
- Frederick Pabst, brewer

== See also ==
- List of gentlemen's clubs in the United States
