= Frederick Vogel =

American politician

Friedrich Vogel (May 8, 1823 – October 23, 1892), more commonly known by the Americanized version of his name as Frederick Vogel Sr., was an American tanner and businessman from Milwaukee, Wisconsin who spent a single one-year term as a member of the Wisconsin State Assembly. Together with Guido Pfister, he founded the Pfister & Vogel tannery.

== Background ==
Vogel was born in Kirchheim unter Teck in the Kingdom of Württemberg on May 8, 1823, son of Johann Michael Vogel, a tanner. He received an academic education, and went into the family trade.

In 1848, Vogel's cousin, Jacob F. Schoellkopf, asked him to leave Württemberg and join him in the United States. He lived for a while in Buffalo, New York and eventually Vogel, bankrolled by Schoellkopf, settled in Milwaukee and opened a tannery in collaboration with his other cousin, Guido Pfister, who kept a leather goods store. With Pfister's help, he built a small tannery which sold its leather through Pfister's Buffalo Leather Company. In 1853 Vogel and Pfister went into partnership. During the early 1850s, Vogel also established tanneries in Chicago and Fort Wayne, Indiana.

Jacob F. Schoellkopf's oldest son, Henry Schoellkopf, learned the leather trade and later worked with Vogel's partner, Guido Pfister, in Wisconsin. Soon thereafter, Henry Schoellkopf married Vogel's daughter, Emily Vogel in 1875. Prior to Henry's early death in 1880, Henry partnered with Vogel and Guido Pfister and opened a tannery in northeast Wisconsin that eventually "became the largest in the world prior to World War I."

== Public office ==
He had served two terms as a member of the Milwaukee Common Council as a Republican, the first in 1856, before being elected to the Assembly from the 8th Milwaukee County district (the 8th and 11th Wards of the City of Milwaukee) in 1873. He was elected as an independent candidate, winning 817 votes to 552 for John Fellenz, the Reform Party candidate (Republican incumbent Galen Seaman was not a candidate); but chose to identify himself as a Liberal Republican when the Assembly convened for 1874, divided between 41 regular Republicans and 59 identified in the Wisconsin Blue Book as "'Opposition,' of all kinds". He was assigned to the standing committee on insurance, banks and banking; and to the joint committee on penal and charitable institutions. He did not run for re-election, and was succeeded by Republican Bernard Schlichting.

== After the Assembly ==
Vogel concentrated on the leather company (known after 1876 as Pfister & Vogel Leather Co.), eventually building it into the largest leather goods maker in the world. Vogel was the firm's expert on bark tanning, serving as vice-president and general manager. He died on October 23, 1892, aboard a transatlantic steamer during the return leg of a vacation in Europe; he had been ill for some time. The Vogel share of the company passed into the hands of his sons Frederick Jr. and August H. Vogel.

== Personal life ==
On March 13, 1850, Vogel married Mrs. August Dresshel; they became the parents of seven children, of whom three daughters and two sons were living as of 1922.
