= Rio Gebhardt =

German pianist, conductor and composer

Rio Gebhardt (1 November 1907 – 24 June 1944) was a German pianist, conductor and composer. He was born in Heilbronn, Germany. His parents made guest appearances in local variety shows. At age 4, he made his first public appearance. He studied with Kurt Weill. His younger brother, Ferry Gebhardt, a student of Edwin Fischer, was a concert pianist and later professor of piano at the Hochschule für Musik und Theater Hamburg.

Gebhardt wrote jazz pieces, pop songs, and a jazz piano concerto. By 1928, he was a member of the EKLA (First Piano Quartet) with Adam Gelbtrunk, Leopold Mittmann, and Alexander Zakin. In 1937, he became the music supervisor for the first German language television play, Kabinett Fulero. The German Broadcasting Archive has a recording of jazz-piano concert with Rudolf Ehrecke at the piano and Gebhardt conducting the orchestra. He also conducted an orchestra at the Folies Bergère in Paris, France. On 24 June 1944 Gebhardt died on the eastern front during World War II. An exhibition marking the 50th anniversary of his death (with catalog) documents his career.
