= A.L. Gebhardt & Co. =

A.L. Gebhardt & Co. was a leather tanning company founded in 1895. It operated in Milwaukee, Wisconsin and Berlin, Germany It produced leather for shoes, handbags and belts. It was owned by U.S. Leather in the late 1980s. Operations were ceased by U.S. Leather in 2000.
